= Gujarat Sahitya Sabha =

Literary institution in Ahmedabad, India

Gujarat Sahitya Sabha, originally called the Social and Literary Association is a literary institution for the promotion of Gujarati literature located in the city of Ahmedabad, India. It was founded by Ranjitram Vavabhai Mehta in 1898. Its name was later changed in 1905.

The main aim of the association is to celebrate the birth anniversaries of great Gujarati littérateurs, publishing and releasing books and also preserving manuscripts. The Gujarat Sahitya Sabha also gives an award called the Ranjitram Suvarna Chandrak since 1928 and is considered as the highest literary honour of the state of Gujarat.

== List of presidents ==
Following people served as presidents:

| No | President | From | To |
|---|---|---|---|
| 1 | Ramanbhai Neelkanth | 1904 | 1928 |
| 2 | Keshavlal Dhruv | 1928 | 13 March 1938 |
| 3 | Anandshankar Dhruv | 1938 | 1942 |
| 4 | Ramnarayan V. Pathak | 1942 | 1947 |
| 5 | Vidyagauri Nilkanth | 1947 | 1959 |
| 6 | Rasiklal Parikh | 1959 | 1982 |
| 7 | Anantrai Raval | 1982 | 1988 |
| 8 | Keshavram Kashiram Shastri | 1990 | 2006 |
| 9 | Madhusudan Parekh | 2006 | 2010 |
| 10 | Kumarpal Desai | 2010 | Incumbent |

== List of vice-presidents ==
Following people served as vice-presidents:

| No | President | From | To |
|---|---|---|---|
| 1 | Janubhai Achratlal Saiyad | 1922 | 1925 |
| 2 | Sakarlal Amritlal Dave | 1925 | 1926 |
| 3 | Hariprasad Vrajrai Desai | 1926 | 1929 |
| 4 | Gaurishankar Govardhanram Joshi | 1929 | 1932 |
| 5 | Hariprasad Vrajrai Desai | 1933 | 1950 |
| 6 | Gaurishankar Govardhanram Joshi | 1955 | 1957 |
| 7 | Rasiklal Parikh | 1957 | 1959 |
| 8 | Chunilal Vardhman Shah | 1959 | 1964 |
| 9 | Anantrai Raval | 1964 | 1980 |
| 10 | Keshavram Kashiram Shastri | 1982 | 1989 |
| 11 | Yashwant Shukla | 1990 | 1999 |
| 12 | Madhusudan Parekh | 2003 | 2006 |
| 13 | Kumarpal Desai | 2006 | 2009 |
| 14 | Yogesh Joshi | 2010 | Incumbent |

== See also ==
- Gujarati Sahitya Parishad
- Gujarat Vidhya Sabha
- Gujarat Sahitya Akademi
