= Harish Nayak =

- Born: 28 October 1926; Surat, Gujarat, India
- Died: 24 October 2023 (aged 96); Ahmedabad, Gujarat, India
- Occupations: Author, storyteller
- Known for: Children's literature
- Awards: Padma Shri (posthumous, 2024)

Harish Nayak (28 October 1926 – 24 October 2023) was an Indian author and storyteller who was a prominent figure in Gujarati children's literature. His body of work includes numerous stories, adaptations, and literary contributions that span multiple genres. In 2024, he was posthumously awarded the Padma Shri by the Government of India in the category of literature and education for his contributions to children's literature and storytelling.

== Early life ==
Harish Nayak was born on 28 October 1926 in Surat, Gujarat, into a modest family. He completed his matriculation in 1943 and began writing soon thereafter, focusing on stories for children.

== Literary career ==
Nayak authored more than 2,000 stories and over 500 books for children, covering a wide range of genres, including animals, adventure, war, religion and mythology, science and space, biography, comedy, radio dramas, folk performance (Bhavai), children's songs, lullabies, fairytales, and adaptations of international literature. His stories were published in magazines such as Zagmag, Bal Sandesh, and Ramakdu, and he created many memorable fictional characters. He also wrote about real-life heroes and soldiers.

Nayak founded his own publication and launched a monthly magazine titled Nayak in 1980, aimed at young readers. He published books in large font without conjunction letters to assist children learning to read and to support adult education at modest prices.

His adaptations of works such as the tales of Hercules and science fiction classics expanded access to world literature for Gujarati children. Some of his works have been translated into Marathi, Hindi, Sindhi and other languages.

== Storytelling and outreach ==
During the World Children's Year in 1979, Nayak reportedly told stories to more than 500,000 children across hundreds of schools in Ahmedabad. He volunteered as a storyteller in hospital wards, orphanages, and slum communities, emphasizing enjoyment, encouragement, and upliftment for all children.

== Awards and recognition ==
Nayak received several honours during his lifetime, including multiple Gujarati Sahitya Parishad Best Book awards and recognition by state and national literary bodies. He was conferred the Sahitya Akademi Bal Sahitya Puraskar in 2017 for his total contribution to children's literature. In 2024, he was posthumously awarded the Padma Shri in literature and education by the Government of India.

== Death ==
Harish Nayak died on 24 October 2023 in Ahmedabad at the age of 97.
