= Chunilal Shah =

Indian novelist and journalist (1887–1966)

Chunilal Vardhman Shah
- Born: 2 May 1887 Wadhwan, Saurastra, British India
- Died: 12 May 1966 (aged 79)
- Occupation: Novelist, journalist

Chunilal Vardhman Shah (1887–1966) was a Gujarati novelist and journalist from Gujarat, India. He was awarded the Ranjitram Suvarna Chandrak in 1937.

== Biography ==
Shah was born in 1887 in Wadhwan, Saurastra, British India. After passing his matriculation exams in 1903, he worked as a school teacher before becoming a journalist in Sanj Vartaman. He subsequently worked for Rajasthan and Jainoday as sub-editor and editor, respectively. In 1909, he joined Prajabandhu and continued working there till it became defunct in 1953. Through his articles in Prajabandhu, he gave a new direction to Gujarati journalism by providing more serious and thought provoking editorials.

Shah wrote book reviews under the pseudonym Sahityapriya in Prajabandhu. He was awarded the Ranjitram Suvarna Chandrak in 1937. He was appointed a chairman of the journalism section of Gujarati Sahitya Parishad in 1941. Along with Gujarati he had command over Hindi, Marathi, Bengali, Urdu, and English. He was deeply involved in Gandhi's political activities. He wrote for the Gujarati magazine Gujarati Panch, started in 1901 by Mangaldas Shah. He was the vice president of Gujarat Sahitya Sabha from 1956 to 1964.

== Works ==
Though he is popular as a novelist, he started his literary career writing poems. His historical novels were inspired by Narayan Visanji Thakkur. Avantinath translated his poems into Sanskrit. Tapovan deals with the issue of the joint family system, Vishchakra exposes evils in the society. Kantakchhayo Panth, his last major project, extended over three volumes. The novel traces political thinkers from 1857 to 1961, the entire freedom struggle, and depicts the difficulty through the word kantak (thorn). Some of the characters in these novels are historical, while some are fictitious.

Jigar ane Ami is a romantic novel based on a true story. It was first serialised in Prajabandhu. The Gujarati film Jigar ane Ami (1970) was based on this novel. The Hindi film actor Sanjeev Kumar and Kanan Kaushal played lead roles in the film.

He wrote about books and authors in Grandh ane Grandhkar with Bachubhai Ravat and K K Shastri.

Novels

- Vamal (1904)
- Pramoda athava Diler Ram (1907)
- Dharanagarino Munj (1911)
- Sindh upar Sawari (1912)
- Somnath nun Shivling (1913)
- Nokarino Umedavar (1914)
- Vasai no Ghero (1916)
- Kartavya Kaumudi (1915)
- Chanakya ane Chandragupt
- Patanani Padatino Prarambh (1916)
- Nyayna Mulmam Niti (1916)
- Mulraj Solanki (1920)
- Karmayogi Rajeshwar (1935)
- Rajhatya (1937)
- Avantinath (1939) (Translated into Sanskrit)
- Roopamati (1941)
- Vilochana (1941)
- Rupano Ghant (1942)
- Jigar and Ami (1943-44)
- Tapovan (1946)
- Vishchakra (1946)
- Ekalveer (1947)
- Nilkanthanun Bann (1947)
- Sandhikaal (1956)
- Kalpanani Paankhe (1958)
- Kantakchhayo Panth (1961)
- "Nagna Satya" - Part 1 & 2 (1961 and 1962). These are Superb Novels.

Plays

- Champraj Hando (1906)
- Devakinandan (1958)
- Sakshar Mahashat (1964)

Short Stories

- Varsha ane Biki Vato (1954)

Biography

- Dharatine Khole (1944)

Children's Literature

- Haiyanu Dham (1963)

Review

- 1930-31 na Granthasth Vangamay

Translation

- Haiyani Thapan (1956)
- Bholo Khedut (1956)

== See also ==
- List of Gujarati-language writers
