= Ishwar Petlikar =

Indian author and journalist

- Born: Ishvar Motibhai Patel; 9 May 1916; Petli village near Petlad in Gujarat
- Died: 22 November 1983 (aged 67)
- Parents: Motibhai (father); Jiviba (mother)

Signature
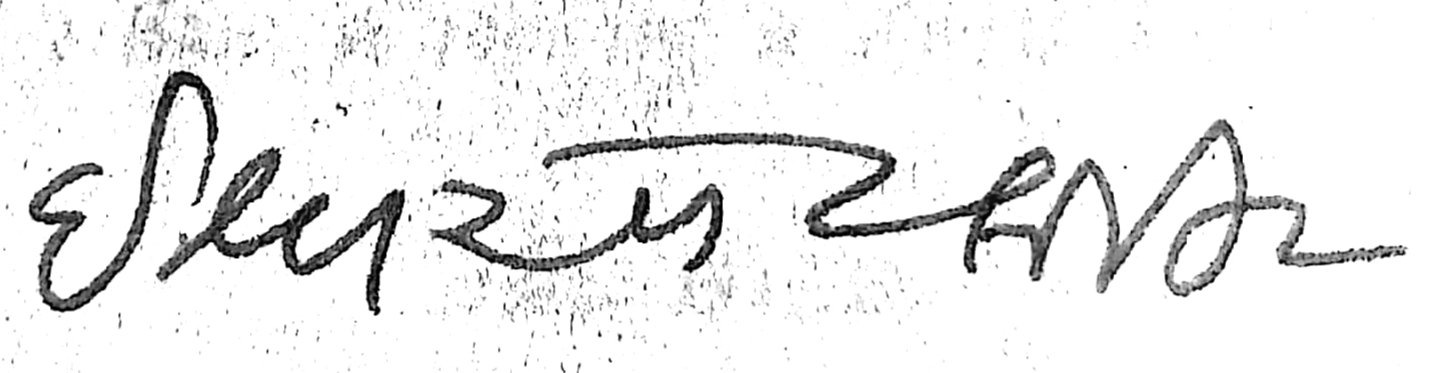

Ishwar Motibhai Patel (9 May 1916 - 22 November 1983), better known by his pen name Ishwar Petlikar, was an Indian Gujarati language author and journalist. Born and educated in villages of Gujarat, he initially worked as a teacher in rural schools before settling in Ahmedabad. Influenced by his experiences in both villages and cities, his works explore themes of social culture and reform.

== Life ==
Ishwar Patel was born in Kadava Patel family on 9 May 1916 in Petli village near Petlad in Gujarat to Motibhai and Jiviba. He changed his last name from Patel to Petlikar in dedication to his village. His primary and secondary education was completed from Petli, Malataj and Sojitra villages and passed matriculation in 1935. He completed his teaching training from Vadodara in 1938 and started teaching at Nedra village near Padra in 1938 and then transferred to Saniyad village of Karjan in 1942. He started writing when he was studying. He edited Patidar and Aryaprakash magazines published from Anand. He settled in Ahmedabad in 1960. He was involved in journalism and social reforms in 1944 and continued till his death. He died on 22 November 1983 following heart attack.

He was awarded Ranjitram Suvarna Chandrak in 1961. He also edited Sansar, a periodical devoted to social problems.

== Works ==
Petlikar wrote more than forty books. The majority of his works are about social issues, culture and reforms.

=== Novels ===
His first novel Janamtip (Life Sentence; 1944) was about socially and economically deprived family. Bhavsagar (1951) was about life in village and its complexities. Pankhi no Melo (1948) and its sequel Patalkuvo (1949) are about life of thieves and police. Kajal ni Kotdi (1949) is about police department after independence of India in 1947. Other novels revolving around society in villages are Dharati no Avtar (1946), Kanku ne Kanya (1946) and Mari Haiyasagadi (1950). His novels about social life in cities include Madhlal (1950), Bhavsagar (1951), Ashapankhi (1953), Taruna Othe Dungar (1954), Kalpavriksh (1956), Shakuntala (1957), Prempanth (1959), Yug na Endhan (1961), Runanubandh (1963), Jayparajay (1963), Jujva Roop (1967), Setubandh (1969), Aabhijaat (1971), Parodhnu Andharu (1980), Vasanti (1981) and Swapna (1982). Lakshagriha (1965) is based on theme of sexual deviation.

=== Novella ===
His novella collections are Parasmani (1949), Chingari (1950), Aakashganga (1958), Kathputali (1962). His short story about relationship between the mother and mentally challenged daughter Lohini Sagai was later made into Gujarati film of the same name in 1980 by Arun Bhatt. His novel Janamtip was adapted into film directed by Feroze A. Sarkar in 1973 by the same name.

=== Biographical works ===
Gramchitro (1944), Dhoopsali (1953), Gomatighat (1961) and Vidyanagar na Viswakarma (1964) are his biographical works.

=== Others ===
Jivandeep (1953), Loksagar ne Tire Tire (1954), Sansar na Vamal (1957), Sudarshan (1960), Mangal Kamna (1964), Sanskar Dhan (1966), Amritmarg (1968) are collections of his essays and journalism.

He wrote columns and articles in various dailies and journals including Loknaad, Nirikshak, Stree, Gujarat Samachar and Sandesh.
