= Carlos G. Vallés =

Spanish-Indian Jesuit priest and author (1925–2020)

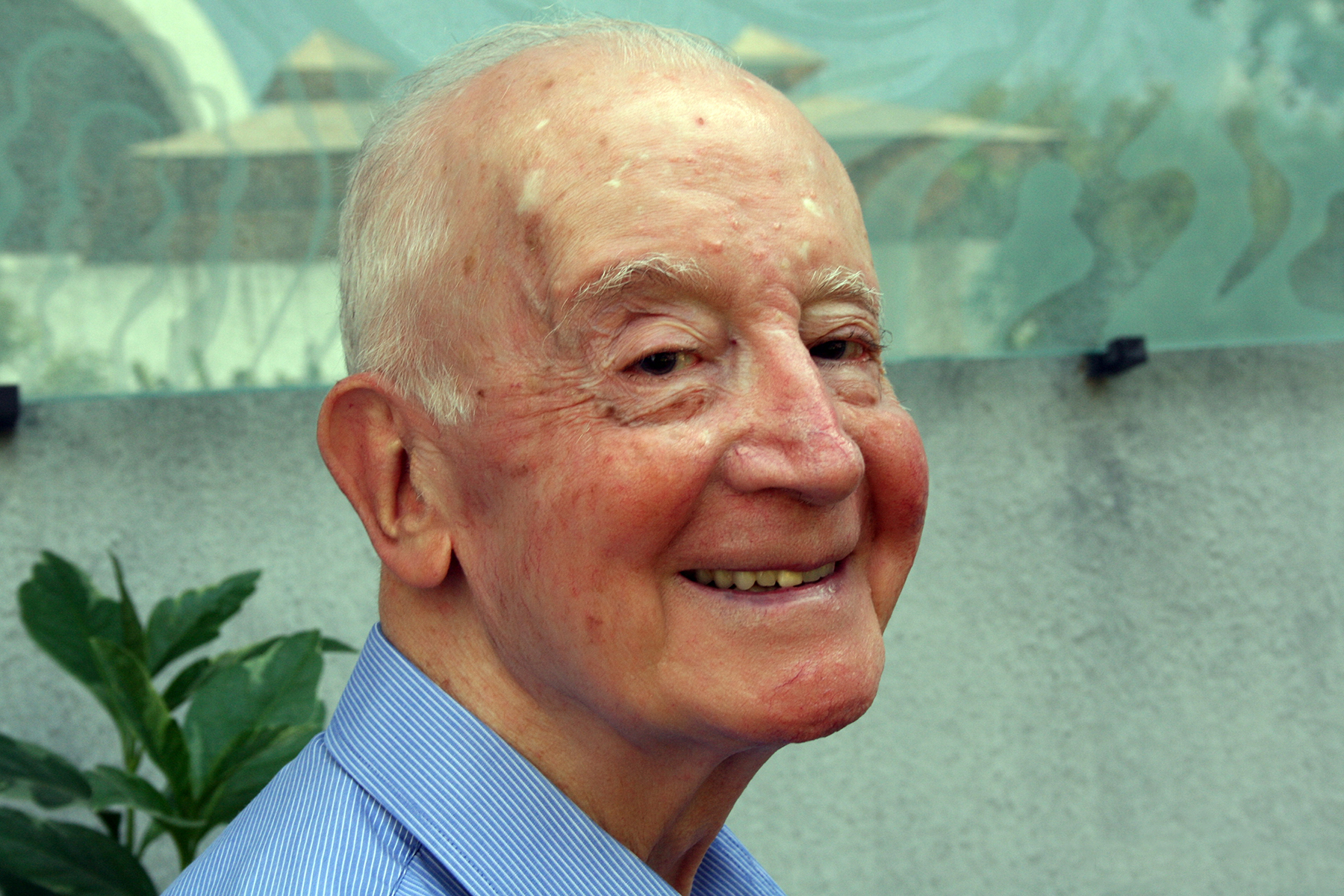
- Vallés at St. Xavier's College, Ahmedabad, 2009
- Born: Carlos González Vallés; 4 November 1925; Logroño, Spain
- Died: 8 November 2020 (aged 95); Madrid, Spain
- Occupation: Author
- Writing career
- Pen name: Father Vallés
- Language: Gujarati, English, Spanish
- Notable awards: Ranjitram Suvarna Chandrak (1978), Padma Shri (2021)
- Website: carlosvalles.com

Carlos González Vallés S.J., popularly known as Father Vallés (4 November 1925 – 8 November 2020), was a Spanish-Indian Jesuit priest and author. He lived in India for five decades and wrote extensively in Gujarati and on mathematics. He also wrote in English and Spanish. He was a recipient of the Ranjitram Suvarna Chandrak, the highest award in Gujarati literature, in 1978. He was awarded the Padma Shri posthumously in 2021.

== Biography ==
=== Early life ===
Vallés was born 4 November 1925 in Logroño, Spain, to an engineer. When he was ten, his father died of Vincent's angina. Six months later, when the Spanish Civil War broke out, he fled his home, along with his mother and brother, and went to live with his mother's aunt, leaving everything behind. He attended a Jesuit school there along with his brother. He became a Jesuit novitiate when he was fifteen and was sent to India in 1949 as a missionary.

=== Years in India ===
In India, Vallés attended Madras University and completed an MA in mathematics with first class honours in 1953. There, he learned English to complete his studies. He later started learning the Gujarati language, as he was asked to teach mathematics at the newly opened St. Xavier's College in Ahmedabad, which had Gujarati students. He learned Gujarati for two years, and later practised writing it during his four-year theological studies at Pune. He was ordained to the priesthood on 24 April 1958.

He started teaching mathematics in Ahmedabad in 1960. He translated many mathematical concepts into Gujarati for Gujarat University and coined terms for them. He helped to start and contributed regularly to the first mathematical review in an Indian language, Suganitam. He also contributed in Gujarati to the encyclopaedia Gnanganga on mathematical topics. He participated in World Mathematical Congress in Moscow, Exeter and Nice.

In 1960, he wrote a Gujarati book titled Sadachar, which he published with the help of his mother, since nobody agreed to publish it. It was successful and he was invited to write in the monthly Kumar by its editors. Five years later he started writing for Kumar and won its annual Kumar Prize for best writing in the monthly.

Later, he started writing in Sunday supplement of Gujarat Samachar in a column titled Navi Pedhine ("To the new generation"). It was successful and his articles were later published as a book. Later, he left his staff quarters in the college and started living with people to understand their life. He would live with one family for a few days and then move to the next one. He lived this way for ten years.

=== Later life ===
Vallés retired from his mathematics chair and left India in 1990. He settled in Madrid and accompanied his ninety-year-old mother until she died at the age of 101. He continued to write in Gujarati, and began translating and writing in English and Spanish focused on his experiences in India and in Latin America.

He died on 8 November 2020, five days after his 95th birthday, in Madrid, Spain.

== Works ==
His works include 75 books in Gujarati, 24 in English and 42 in Spanish. He wrote twelve books on mathematics. He also co-authored the series of mathematics textbooks in Gujarati. His works are also translated in Chinese and other European languages.

His selected works include:

- Gandhi: Alternative to Violence
- Nine Nights in India
- Life with honour
- Leader of leaders
- Teacher to a nation
- Himalayan Blunder
- Cult of excellence
- Two Countries, One Life

Gujarati

- Sadachar
- Lagnasagar
- Gandhiji and Navi Pedhi
- Kutumb Mangal
- Dharma Mangal
- Atmiya Kshano
- Vvyaktitva Ghadatar
- Jivan Darshan
- College Jivan
- Charitrya Yagna
- Sanskar Tirth
- Gharna Prashno

His collections of essays include Maru Sukh, Maru Dukh, Aagekooch, Bhagwanni Rojnishi, Jeevanni Taiyari, Taramaitrak, Shabdalok, Mor Ane Dhel. His autobiography, Atmakathana Tukda in Gujarati was translated by Amit Joharapurkar into Marathi as Atmakathecha Ansh, in 2020.

== Recognition ==
Vallés won the literary prize for essays from the Government of Gujarat five times. He received the Kumar Chandrak in 1966. He was awarded the Ranjitram Suvarna Chandrak, the highest award in Gujarati literature, in 1978. He was the first foreign recipient of the prize. His domestic wandering to understand culture and people won him the Acharya Kakasaheb Kalelkar Award for Universal Harmony in 1995 and the Ramakrishna Jaidalal Harmony Award in 1997. He was also named an Honorary Jain for his friendship with Jain community in Mumbai. He was awarded the Santokbaa Award.

In 2021, Vallés was posthumously awarded the Padma Shri, the fourth highest civilian award of India, by the Government of India for his contribution in literature and education.

== See also ==
- List of Gujarati-language writers
