= Arvind Vaidya =

Indian actor and theatre director

- Born: Arvind Gopal Vaidya; 1940 or 1941 (age 85–86)
- Occupations: Actor, director
- Years active: 1967–present
- Known for: Anupamaa, Sarabhai vs Sarabhai, Khichdi
- Children: 2 including Vandana Pathak
- Awards: Padma Shri (2026)

Arvind Gopal Vaidya (born 1940 or 1941) is an Indian actor and director in Gujarati theatre and Hindi television.

In January 2026, he was awarded the Padma Shri, India's fourth-highest civilian honour, in recognition of his contributions to the performing arts over a career spanning more than six decades.

== Early life and education ==
Vaidya was born in 1940 or 1941 into a Marathi family. Despite not knowing the Gujarati language, he began working in Gujarati theatre. He credits Jashwant Thaker, an initial member of the Indian People's Theatre Association (IPTA), as his mentor. Thaker assisted him in mastering the Gujarati language and the nuances of performance.

== Career ==
Vaidya's career began in theatre; his directorial debut was the play Paritran in 1967. Over sixty years, he has directed more than 200 plays and appeared in over 100 television series. He is also the founder of the acting institute Natya Sampada.

He is known for his work in comedy TV series such as Khichdi and Sarabhai vs Sarabhai. As of 2026, he is known for his work as "Bapuji" in the drama series Anupamaa.

In January 2026, he was conferred with the Padma Shri.

== Filmography ==
=== Film ===
Year	Title	Role	Notes
2010	Right Yaaa Wrong	Police chief	
2010	Khichdi: The Movie	Chandrakant Seth	Hansa's father
2015	Maal Kiska Kamal Kiska		Director

=== Television ===
Year	Title	Role	Notes
2002–2004	Khichdi	Chandrakant Seth	Recurring role
2004–2006	Sarabhai vs Sarabhai	Madhusudan Bhai ("Fufa")	Recurring role
2005	Instant Khichdi	Chandrakant Seth	Hansa's father
2017	Sarabhai vs Sarabhai: Take 2	Madhusudan Bhai	Madhu Fufa
2018	Khichdi	Chandrakant Seth	Hansa's father
2020–present	Anupamaa	Hasmukh "Bapuji" Shah	Main cast

== Personal life ==
Vaidya has a son who lives in Atlanta, United States. His daughter, Vandana Pathak, is also a noted actress. He currently resides in India, where he remains active in the television industry.

== Awards ==
- Padma Shri (2026)
