= Nanamava =

Village in Gujarat, India

Nanamava is a village in the Rajkot district in the state of Gujarat, India. It was inherited by Thakor Shri Mokaji Jadeja from his father, Thakor Shri Kalaji Meramanji Jadeja. The village's population is 300 to 400 people.

== History ==
Thakor Shri Meramanji (2nd) (Vikram Samvat 1750-76) was a king of Rajkot, who conquered many villages of the city of Junagadh, which increased the area of his kingdom. Masumkhan, with support from the Badshah of Delhi, conquered the areas of Rajkot and Sardhar from Meramanji in 1776, and changed the name of the kingdom to Masumabad.

=== Castes ===
The people of Nanamava mainly belong to the Kshatriya, Rajput, or Garasiya castes.

== Temples ==
The Jagannathji temple of Nanamava was the first in organizing Lord Jagannath's largest Rath Yatra of Rajkot.
