= Jaybhikhkhu =

Indian novelist, short story writer, playwright, essayist and biographer

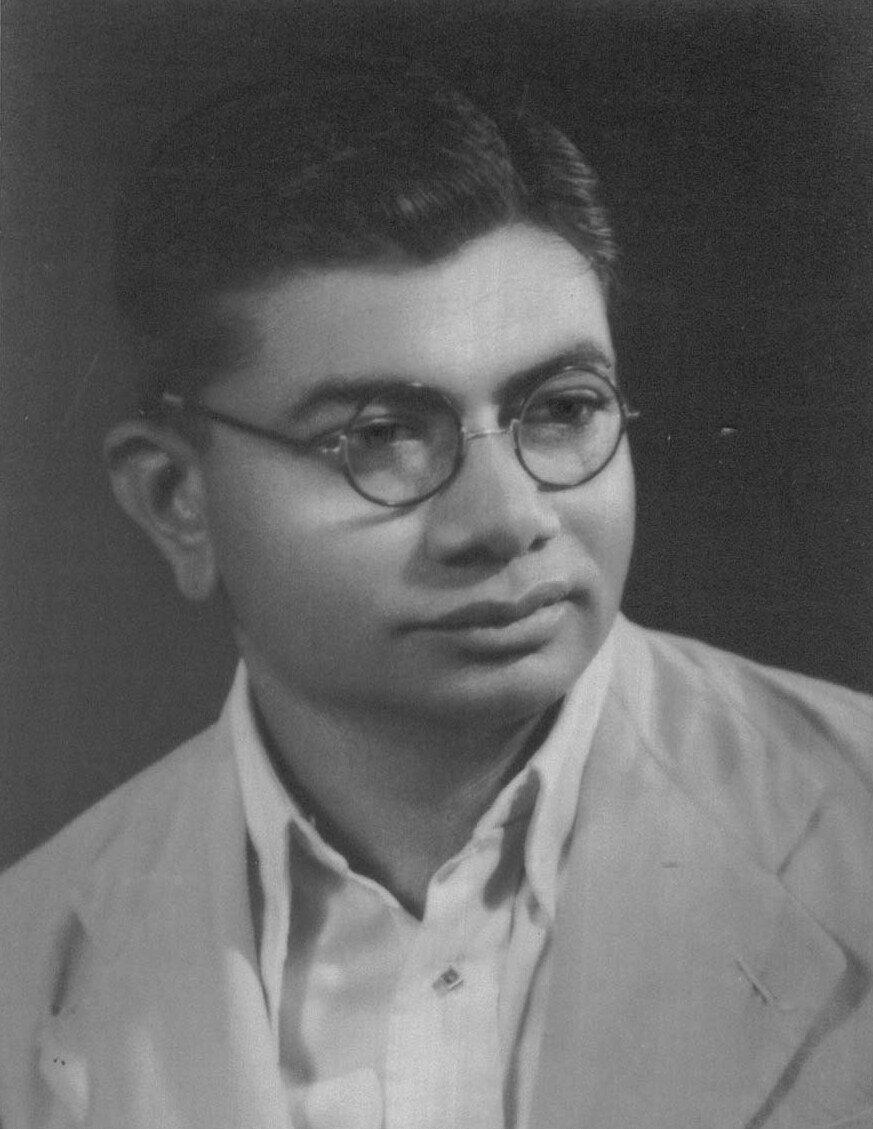
- Young Jaybhikhkhu
- Born: Balabhai Virchand Desai; 26 June 1908; Vinchhiya, Saurashtra, British India
- Died: 24 December 1969 (aged 61); Ahmedabad, Gujarat, India
- Occupations: Novelist; essayist; biographer; children's writer
- Spouse: Vijayabahen (m. 1930)
- Children: Kumarpal Desai
- Writing career
- Pen name: Jaybhikhkhu, Veerkumar, Bhikshu Saylakar
- Language: Gujarati

Balabhai Virchand Desai, better known by his pen name Jaybhikhkhu, was a Gujarati novelist, short story writer, playwright, essayist, and biographer from Gujarat, India. He is known for his historical novels.

== Biography ==
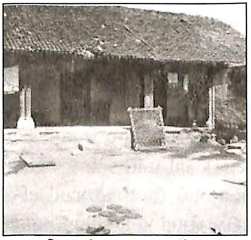
Jaybhikhkhu's Birthplace in Vinchhiya

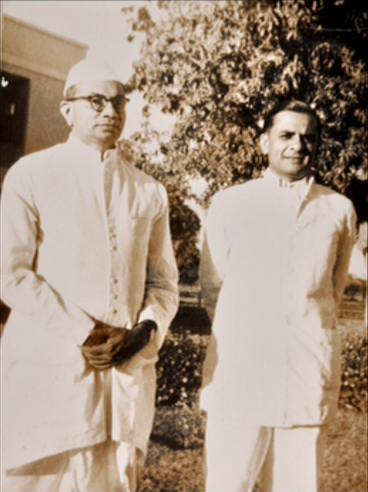
Jaybhikhkhu with Dhirubhai Thaker (right), around 1948

Jaybhikhkhu was born on 26 June 1908 at Vinchhiya, a village in Saurashtra to Virchand Khemchandbhai Desai and Parvatibahen. His family belonged to Sayla. His father had served as an administrator of the Varsoda State and other principalities. His mother died in Wadhwan when he was four so he spent his childhood in his maternal uncle's home.

He received his primary education in Botad and in Varsoda near Vijapur. He received secondary education till level 3 in English medium from Tutorial Highschool, Ahmedabad. He left school and joined Shri Veertatva Prakashak Mandal in Vile Parle, Bombay founded by Vijaydharma Suri. When this institute moved, he moved to Kashi, Agra and at last to Gurukul at Shivapuri in Gwalior state. He studied Sanskrit, Hindi, Gujarati and English literature as well as Jain philosophy and poetics during these eight-nine years. He received Nyayatirtha from Culcutta Sanskrit Association and Tarkabhushan from Shivpuri Gurukul.

He was influenced by religious environment in his family, his education in Jain philosophy and poetics. He was impressed by Govardhanram Tripathi's Saraswatichandra. He had decided to follow four rules in his life: never do a job, not take any property from his father, not give his son any property and earn living through writing.

He died on 24 December 1969 in Ahmedabad.

== Works ==
Jaybhikhkhu was a novelist, short story writer, playwright, biographer, children's writer and journalist. He had written more than 300 books including 20 novels, 21 short story collections, 7 plays and 66 short biographies. His Prembhakta Kavi Jaydev was adapted into Gujarati film Geetgovind by Kanu Desai. He wrote several popular columns in dailies including Int Ane Imarat in Gujarat Samachar, Na Phool Na Kanta in Gujarat Times. He also wrote columns in Jain Jyoti, Vidyarthi and Ravivar weeklies as well as Zagmag, a children's weekly published by Gujarat Samachar. He was also associated with Akhand Anand and Jankalyan magazines.

=== Novels ===
- Bhagyavidhata (1935)
- Kamavijeta Sthulibhadra (1941)
- Bhagwan Rushabhdev (1947)
- Chakravarti Bharatdev (1953)
- Bharat Bahubali (1958)
- Prembhakta Kavi Jaydev (1945)
- Vikramaditya Hemu (1944)
- Bhagyanirman (1948)
- Dilhishwar (1951)
- Prem Nu Mandir (1950)
- Premavatar Part I-II (1963)
- Lokhandi Khakh Na Phool Part I-II (1960)
- Narkesari (1962)
- Sansarsetu (1960)
- Shatru Ke Ajatshatru Part I-II (1961)
- Buro Deval (1955)
- Dasi Janam Janamni (1958)

=== Short story collections ===
- Madare Vatan (1950)
- Yadavasthali (1952)
- Matinu Attar (1963)
- Gulab ane Kantak
- Sat Ni Bandhi Prithvi (1957)
- Upavan (1944)
- Parka Ghar Ni Lakshmi (1946)
- Kanchan ane Kamini (1950)
- Angana (1956)
- Kajal ane Ariso (1962)
- Kanyadan (1964)
- Kar Le Singar (1959)
- Sooli Par Sej Hamari (1964)
- Manva Ni Tekri
- Kaam Nu Aushadh
- Lilo Santho
- Pag Nu Zanzar (1967)
- Manzarukho (1965)
- Sinhpurush (1953)
- Devdooshya (1951)
- Bhagwan Mallinath (1949)
- Virdharmani Vato (1947)
- Jaybhikhkhu Vartasaurabh Part I (1956)
- Jaybhikhkhu Vartasaurabh Part II (1956)
- Pap ane Punya (1958)

=== Plays ===
- Rasiyo Valam (1955)
- Aa Dhool, Aa Mati (1964)
- Patit-Pavan (1953)
- Bahuroopi (1955)
- Panna Dai (1955)
- Geetgovind No Gayak (1952)

== Style and influence ==
Jaybhikhkhu wrote in modern period but the choice of his subjects, novel genres and style are consistent with the previous generation of writers. His education in Jain institutes and the wandering in the forests and natural places of the central India are chief influence on his writing. The influence is apparent in choice of religious and historical subjects as well adventure inspiring real incidents in his writings. He was among the first writers who selected mythological and historical subjects from Jain religious literature and wrote novels on them diluting its religiosity and highlighting the humanity. His writings are fast-paced, picturesque and adorned with metaphors; influenced by his study of Sanskrit literature. His creativity is visible in historical novels. His short stories are simple and plot driven as in the old school style. His writings for teens include adventure inspiring and informative. He has written animal fables in the style of Panchatantra drawing from Hindu, Jain and Buddhist literature.

== Legacy ==
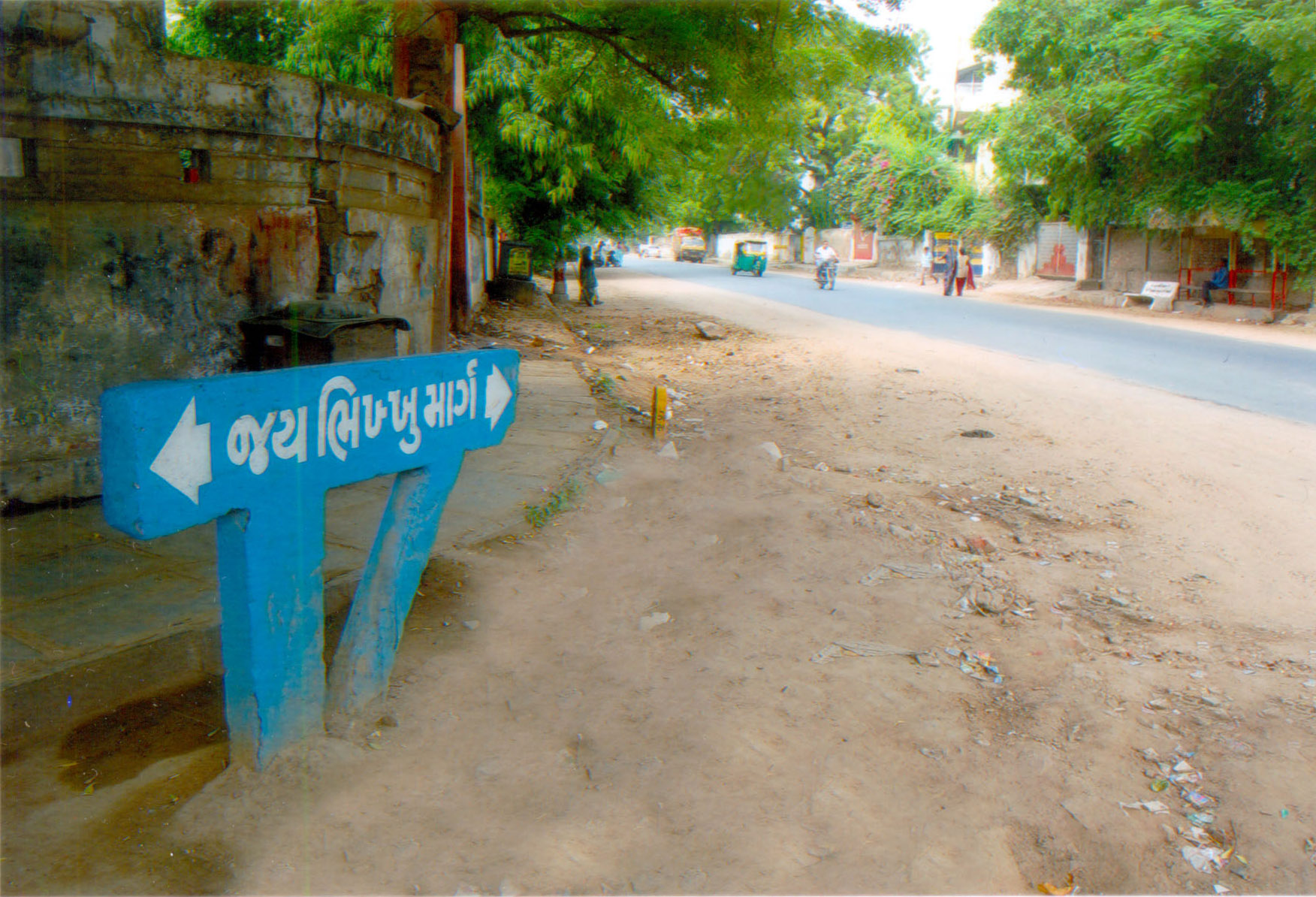
Jaybhikhkhu road in Ahmedabad named after him

A road in Paldi area of Ahmedabad is named after him. Established in his memory, Shri Jaybhikhkhu Sahitya Trust publishes books, organises lectures, gives scholarships and Jaybhikhkhu Award.

== Personal life ==
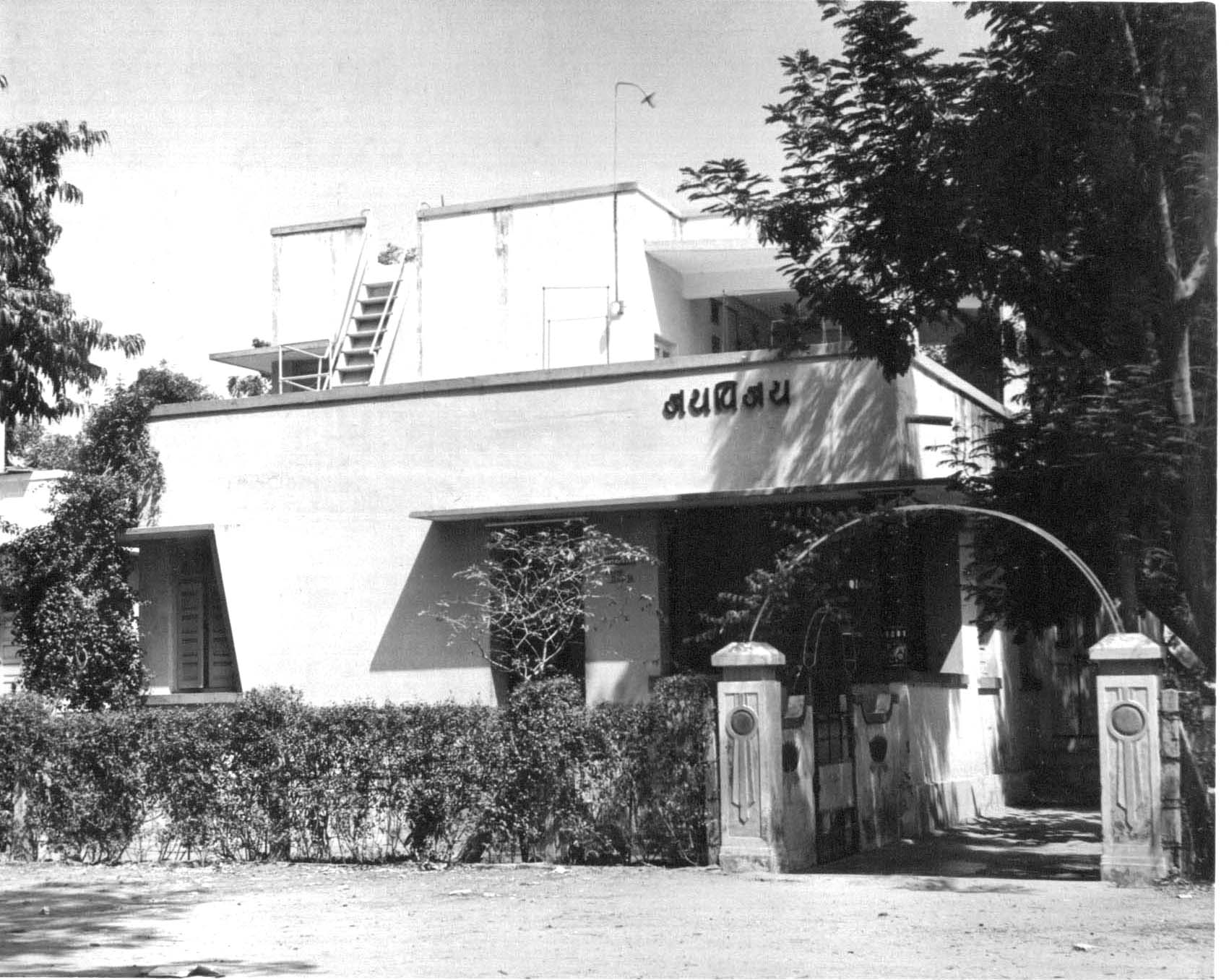
Jayvijay, his residence in Ahmedabad

Jaybhikhkhu married Vijayabahen, a daughter of a businessman from Ranpur, on 13 May 1930. Their son Kumarpal Desai is also a writer.

Jaybhikhhu was fondly called Bhikhalal in his childhood while Balabhai was his official name. Jaybhikhkhu had written under several pseudonyms. He first published a biography of his guru Vijayadharma Suri in 1929 under pseudonym Bhikshu Saylakar, made up from his childhood name Bhikhalal and his native Sayla. Another pseudonym used by him was Veerkumar. He created his pseudonym Jaybhikhkhu from a name of his wife Vijaya and his childhood name Bhikhalal.

== See also ==
- List of Gujarati-language writers
