= Kumarpal Desai =

India writer (born 1942)

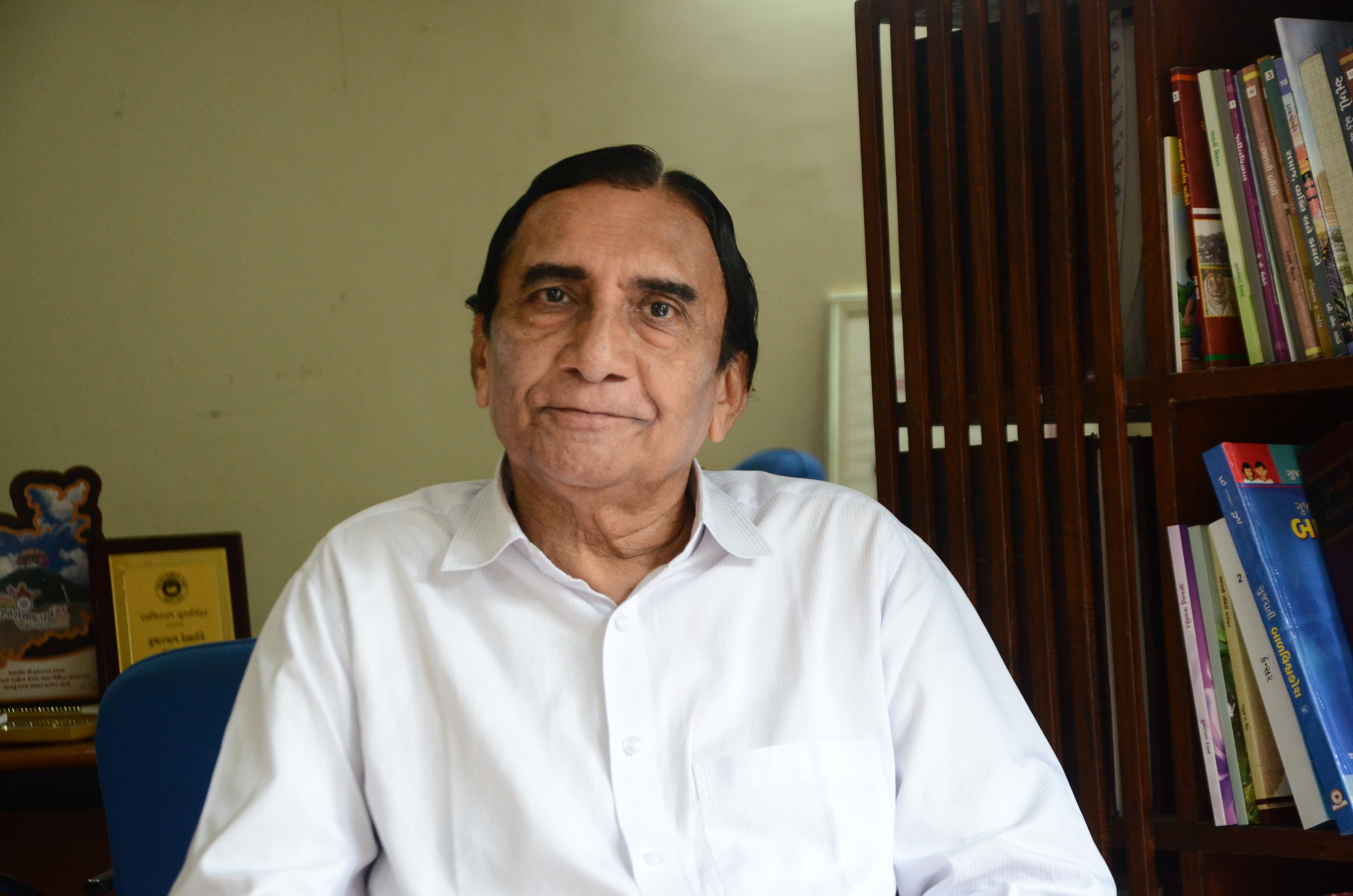
- Born: Kumarpal Balabhai Desai; 30 August 1942 (age 84); Ranpur (now in Botad district, Gujarat), India
- Education: Gujarat University
- Occupations: writer, critic, columnist, translator
- Spouse: Pratima
- Children: 2 sons
- Writing career
- Pen name: Desai in 2017
- Language: Gujarati
- Notable awards: Dhanji Kanji Gandhi Suvarna Chandrak (2001); Padma Shri (2004); Sahitya Gaurav Puraskar (2009); Ranjitram Suvarna Chandrak (2015)
- Kumarpal Desai's voice Introduction of poet Niranjan Bhagat

Academic background
- Thesis: Anandghana: A Study with Special Reference to Anandghana Bavisi
- Doctoral advisor: Dhirubhai Thaker

Kumarpal Balabhai Desai is an author, critic, editor, journalist, columnist and translator from Gujarat, India. He studied and later taught at the Gujarat University. He is associated with several social and Gujarati literary organisations such as Gujarati Sahitya Parishad. He has written and edited more than hundred books including biographies and several works on Jainism. He was awarded the Padma Shri in 2004.

== Early life ==
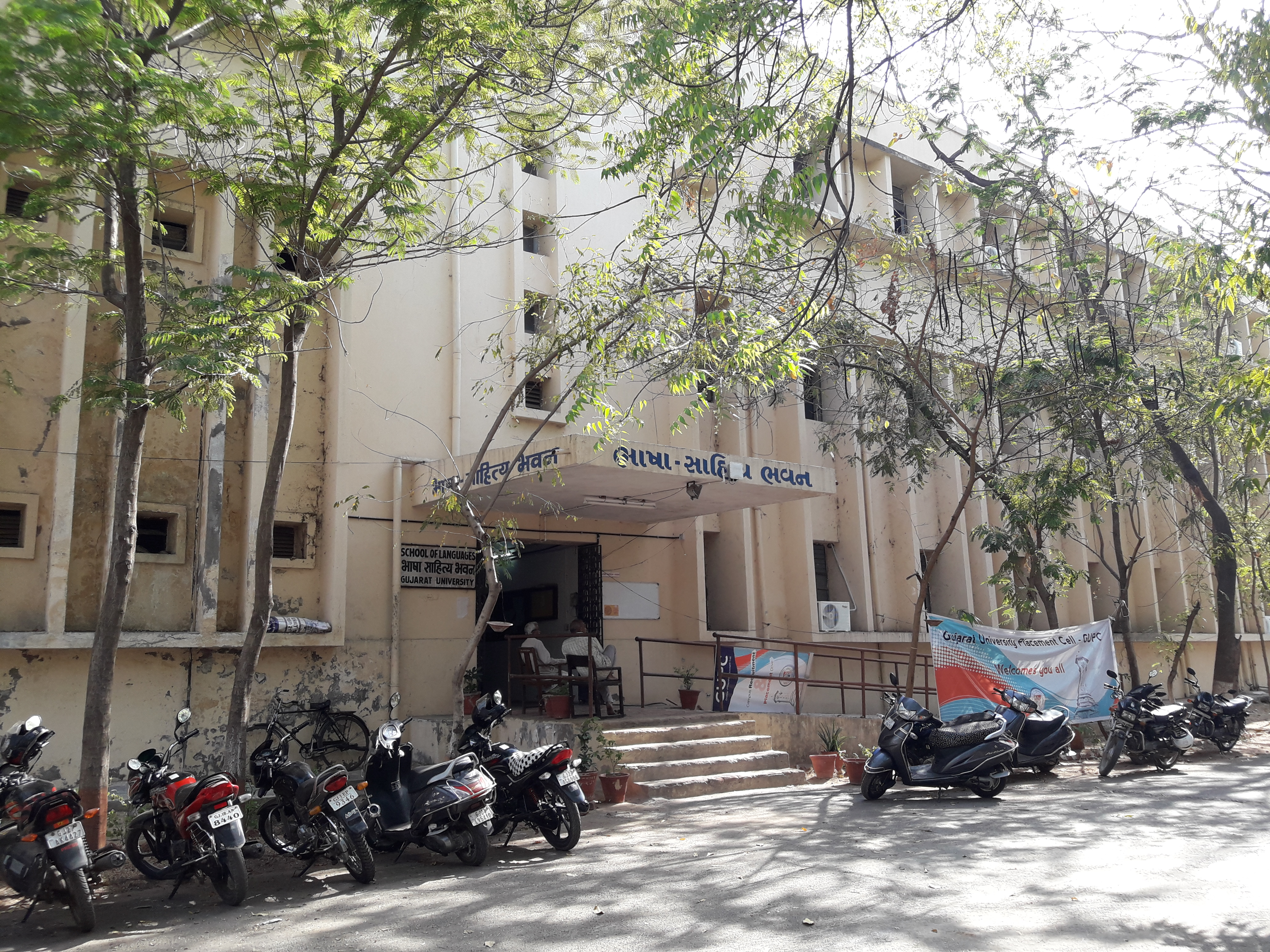
School of Languages where Desai served as director and professor

Kumarpal Desai was born on 30 August 1942 at Ranpur to Balabhai Desai whose nom-de-plume was Jaybhikhkhu, a prolific Gujarati writer; and Jayaben. His family is native of Sayla. He joined H. K. Arts College. He completed BA and MA in 1963 and 1965 respectively from Gujarat University with Gujarati as a major subject.

== Academic career ==
Desai joined Navgujarat College in Ahmedabad as a professor in 1965. He was awarded PhD in 1980 for his thesis on Anandghan completed under guidance of Dhirubhai Thaker. In 1983, he joined the Department of Gujarati Literature, School of Languages, Gujarat University. He became a Reader in 1988 and a Professor in 2000. He became the Head of Department in November 2001 and the Director, School of languages in 2003 and served till 2004. He was elected the Dean, Faculty of Arts and served for two years. Twenty students received PhD under his guidance by researching subjects like Jain philosophy, Gujarati journalism and peace. He had also worked as a sports commentator. He serves as a professor emeritus at Vishwabharati Institute, Ladnu.

== Literary career ==
He started writing at the age of eleven. His first short story was published in children's weekly Zagmag. He was influenced by his father Jaybhikhukhu and several other writers like Jhaverchand Meghani, Gunvantrai Acharya, Dhumketu and Dula Bhaya Kag. His first book Vatan, Tara Ratan when he was in college. In 1962, he started writing a column in Gujarat Samachar and his first book, a children's biography, Lal Gulab on Lal Bahadur Shastri was published in 1965. The book was successful and he wrote full biography Mahamanav Shastri on him in 1966. Subsequently, he wrote several biographies. He also created as a wit and humour character Damodar Mehta for children's books.

He also served as the president of Gujarati Sahitya Parishad. He also served as the president of Gujarat Sahitya Sabha as well as the vice-president of Gujarat Vidyasabha and Gujarat Sahitya Akademi. He is the Managing Trustee for the Institute of Jainology, India and Director of the Gujarati Vishwakosh Trust.

He writes five weekly columns; Int ane Imarat (since 1970), Jhakal Banyu Moti, Pandadu Ane Pyramid, Aakaash Ni Olakh and Parijat no Parisamwad in Gujarati daily Gujarat Samachar.

== Works ==
=== Gujarati ===
Desai is a prolific writer. His collections of short stories include Ekante Kolahal (1976), Suvarna Mruga (1985), Bhavni Bhavai (1987), Bindu Banyu Moti (1986). His other books are Mahenk Manavtani, Biradari (1971), Moti Ni Mala (1975), Kede Katari, Khabhe Dhal (1969), Moti Ni Kheti (1983), Vaheti Vato (1983). His only novel Anahata was published in 2019, which recounts the story of Kunti, a character from the Hindu epic Mahabharata.

His works of criticism are Sabdasannidhi (1980), Bhavan-Vibhavan (1986), Hemchandracharyani Sahitya-Sadhna (1988), Sahityik Nisbat (2007), Shabdasameep, Anandghan Jeevan Ane Kavan. Apragat Madhyakalin Kritio (1982) is his research work in medieval works. His other research works are Gyanvimalsuri Krut Stabak (1979), Anandghan : Ek Adhyayan (1980), Apragat Madhyakalin Krutio (1982), Shree Mahavir Jain Vidyalaya Shatabdi Granth Part - 1, 2 (2015).

He has edited several works including Ekvismi Sadinu Bal Sahitya (2000), Adavat Vinani Adalat (2000), Ek Divas Ni Maharani (2000), Jaybhikhkhu Ni Dharma Katha, Shabdashri, Bal Sahitya Sangosthi, Parivartan Nu Prabhat, Jaibhikhkhu Smritigranth (1970), Savyasachi Sarasvat (2007), Shrimad Rajchandra ane Mahatma Gandhi (2003), Kavi Dula Kag Smritigranth, Haimsmriti, Narmad Aajna Sandarbhma, Ojas Ditha Atmabalna.

He has also published collections of philosophical essays. His inspirational essays are Zakal Banyu Moti 1-2-3 (1983), Trusha Ane Trupti (1986), Shraddhanjali (1994), Jeevan nu Amrut (1996), Dukhni Pankharma Anandno Ek Tahuko (1997), Abol Ni Atamwani (1998), Zakal Bhina Moti (1998). His other essay collections are Motini Kheti, Manavtani Mahek, Kshamapana.

His Biographical works are Apang Na Ojas (1973), Mahamanav Shastri (on Lal Bahadur Shastri, 1966), Veer Rammurti (1976), Afatoni Andhi Vachche Samruddhi Nu Shikhar (2000), Balakona Buddhisagarsurishwarji (on Buddhisagarsuri, 1979), Firak Gorakhpuri (1984), Moolmarg Nu Amrut Ane Adhyatmanu Shikhar (2000), Manavtani Mahek (2000), Jivtarni Vate Aksharrno Divo (2014).

He wrote children's biography of Lal Bahadur Shastri, Lal Gulab (1965). His other works for children are Vatan Tara Ratan (1965), Dahyo Damaro (1967), Haiyu Nanu, Himat Moti (1976), Nani Ummar, Motu Kam (1978), Motne Hath Tali (1973), Zabak Divadi (1975), Parakrami Ram (1977), Ram Vanvas (1977), Sita Haran (1977), Veer Hanuman (1978), C. K. Naidu (1978), Chalo Pashuo Ni Duniyaman (Part I to III) (1980), Bhim (1980), Lokhandi Dadaji (1992), Katharot Man Ganga (1993), Dhol Wage Dhamadham (1993), Vato Na Valu (1993), Sach Na Sipahi (1993).

He has translated Austin Bukenya's play, The Bride as Navavadhu (2000) in Gujarati. He has written two books on journalism, Akhabari Lekhan (1979), Sahitya ane Patrakaratva (1999). He has also published some books in English and contributed in field of sports also.

=== English and Hindi ===
He has written several books in English, mostly related to Jainism. His works include Stories from Jainism (1988), Bhagvan Mahavir (1990), Non-Violence – A way of life (1990), Kshamapana (1990), Glory of Jainism (1991), A Pinnacle of Spirituality (2000), Essence of Jainism (2000), The Value and Heritage of Jain Religion, The Role of Women in Jain Religion, The Timeless Message of Bhagwan Mahavir, Vegetarianism (2000), A Journey of Ahimsha (2002), Our Life in the Context of Five Anuvrats and Anekantwad (2003), Tirthankar Mahavir (2003), Influence of Jainism on Mahatma Gandhi (2003), Jainism : The Cosmic Vision (2014), The Brave Heart (2009). Jin Shashan Ki Kirtigatha (1999), Apahij Tan Adig Man (2000) and Anandghan (2006) are in Hindi.

=== On Jainism ===
Desai is an expert of Indian culture, Jainism and Jain literature. He regularly delivers lectures on Jain philosophy and Indian culture in India and abroad.

His books on Jainism include Anandghan – A Study (1980, on Anandghan), Stabak by Gyanvimalsuri (1988), Activities of Jain religion in the last decade (1988), Literary Achievements of Kalikal Sarvagna Hemchandracharya (1988, on Hemchandra), Moti Ni Kheti (Religious tales from Jain religion) (1983), Balako Na Buddhisagarji (1979), Kshamapana – review of the rituality of forgiveness from the point of view of Jainology., Bhagwan Mahavir – Life and principles of Lord Mahavir (1990, on Mahavira), Bhagwan Rishabhdev – Life and teachings of the First Tirthankar of religion (on Rishabhadeva). (1983), Bindu Banyu Moti (tales from Jain Religion) (1986), Anandghan – Life and works (1998), Samaro Mantra Bhalo Navkar (1998), Jinshashan ni Kirtigatha (1998), Atmagyani Shraman Kahave – Life of Kailassagar Suri, Bhagwan Mallinath – Biography (1989, on Māllīnātha), Balavabodh of Merusunder, Shri Mahavir-jivandarshan – detailed study of the life and teachings of Mahavira., Ahimsa ni yatra (2002), Tirthankara Mahavira (2002). His edited works on Jainism are Shankheshwar Mahatirth, Jaybhikhkhu Ni Jain Dharmakathao - religious tales of Jaybhikhkhu; complication of 2 volumes, Ojas Ditha Atmabal Na and Dhanya Che Dharma Tane - lectures of Vijay Vallabhsuri, Ratnatrayi Na Aajwala, Samayik Sutra with explanation, Atmavallabh Smaranika.

== Awards ==
He was awarded the Padma Shri, the fourth highest civilian award of India, in 2004. He has also been conferred many other awards including the Jain Ratna Award (2001), Gujarat Ratna award, Dhanji Kanji Gandhi Suvarna Chandrak (2001), Hemchandracharya Award (2002), Sahitya Gaurav Puraskar (2009) and Ranjitram Suvarna Chandrak (2015). In 2019, he received the Bal Sahitya Puraskar from Sahitya Akademi for his contribution in Gujarati children's literature.

== Personal life ==
Desai married Pratima and has two sons, Kaushal and Nirav.

== See also ==
- List of Gujarati-language writers
