= Ranjitram Suvarna Chandrak =

- Ranjitram Gold Medal
- Awarded for: Contributions in the field of Gujarati literature and culture
- Location: Ahmedabad
- Country: India
- Presented by: Gujarat Sahitya Sabha
- First award: 1928
- Final award: 2015
- Currently held by: Kumarpal Desai

Ranjitram Suvarna Chandrak, also known as the Ranjitram Gold Medal, was founded by Gujarat Sahitya Sabha and is considered the highest literary award in Gujarati literature. The award is named after renowned Gujarati writer Ranjitram Mehta. It is awarded since 1928. The award has not been presented since 2015.

== Recipients ==
List of recipients:

- 1928 Jhaverchand Meghani
- 1929 Gijubhai Badheka
- 1930 Ravishankar Raval
- 1931 Vijayray Vaidya
- 1932 Ramanlal Desai
- 1933 Ratnamanirao Jote
- 1934 Sundaram
- 1935 Vishwanath Bhatt
- 1936 Chandravadan Mehta
- 1937 Chunilal Shah
- 1938 Kanu Desai
- 1939 Umashankar Joshi
- 1940 Dhansukhlal Mehta
- 1941 Jyotindra Dave
- 1942 Rasiklal Parikh
- 1943 Omkarnath Thakur
- 1944 Vishnuprasad Trivedi
- 1945 Gunvantrai Acharya
- 1946 Dolarrai Mankad
- 1947 Harinarayan Aacharya
- 1948 Bachubhai Ravat
- 1949 Somalal Shah
- 1950 Pannalal Patel
- 1951 Jaishankar Bhojak 'Sundari'
- 1952 Keshavram Kashiram Shastri
- 1953 Bhogilal Sandesara
- 1954 Chandulal Patel
- 1955 Anantrai Raval
- 1956 Rajendra Shah
- 1957 Chunilal Madia
- 1958 Krishnalal Shridharani
- 1959 Jayanti Dalal
- 1960 Hariprasad Shastri
- 1961 Ishwar Petlikar
- 1962 Ramsinhji Rathod
- 1963 Harivallabh Bhayani
- 1964 Manubhai Pancholi
- 1965 Bapalal Vaidya
- 1966 Hasmukh Sankaliya
- 1967 Snehrashmi
- 1968 Manjulal Majmudar
- 1969 Niranjan Bhagat
- 1970 Shivkumar Joshi
- 1971 Suresh Joshi
- 1972 Natvarlal Pandya 'Ushnas'
- 1973 Prabodh Pandit
- 1974 Hiraben Pathak
- 1975 Raghuveer Chaudhari
- 1976 Jayant Pathak
- 1977 Jashwant Thaker
- 1978 Father Carlos G. Vallés
- 1979 Makarand Dave
- 1980 Dhiruben Patel
- 1981 Labhshankar Thakar
- 1982 Harindra Dave
- 1983 Suresh Dalal
- 1984 Bhagwatikumar Sharma
- 1985 Chandrakant Sheth
- 1986 Ramesh Parekh
- 1987 Sitanshu Yashaschandra
- 1988 Bakul Tripathi
- 1989 Vinod Bhatt
- 1990 Nagindas Parekh
- 1991 Ramanlal Nagarji Mehta
- 1992 Yashwant Shukla
- 1993 Amrut 'Ghayal'
- 1994 Dhirubhai Thaker
- 1995 Bholabhai Patel
- 1996 Ramanlal Soni
- 1997 Gunvant Shah
- 1998 Gulabdas Broker
- 1999 Madhu Rye
- 2000 C. N. Patel
- 2001 Narayan Desai
- 2002 Chandrakant Topiwala
- 2003 Madhusudan Parekh
- 2004 Radheshyam Sharma
- 2005 Varsha Adalja
- 2006 Rajendra Shukla
- 2007 Mohammad Mankad
- 2008 Dhiru Parikh
- 2009 Chimanlal Trivedi
- 2010 Madhusudan Dhaky
- 2011 Dhirendra Mehta
- 2012 Sunil Kothari
- 2013 Nalin Raval
- 2014 Pravin Darji
- 2015 Kumarpal Desai
