= Ratnamanirao Jhote =

Indian historian

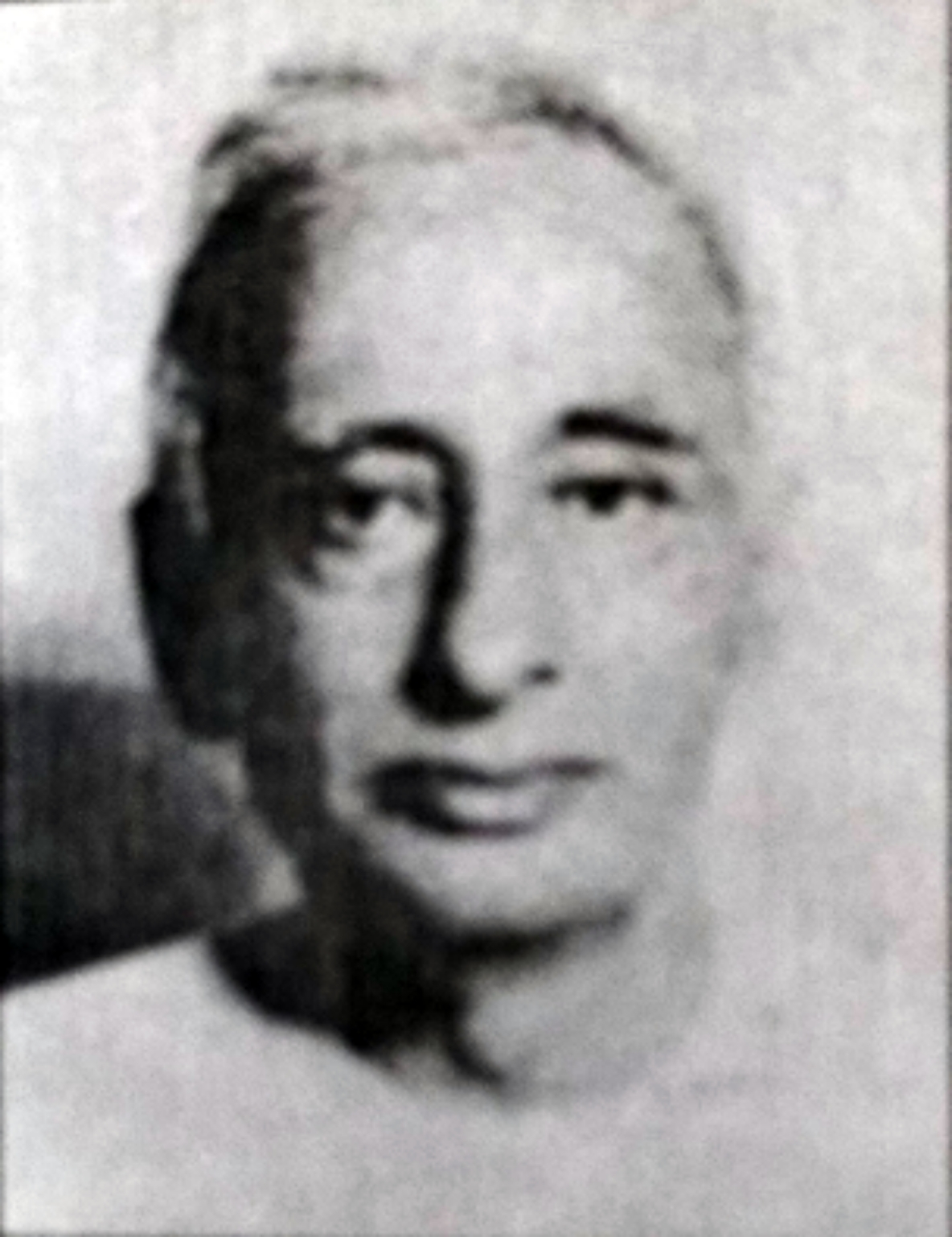
Ratnamanirao Jhote

Ratnamanirao Bhimrao Jhote (19 October 1895 – 24 September 1955) was an Indian historian who wrote extensively on the history and culture of Gujarat.

== Biography ==
Ratnamanirao Bhimrao Jhote was born on 19 October 1895 at Bhuj to Dewan Motilal Lalbhai. He was nicknamed Bhanabhai by his family. He was born prematurely. His maternal home was in Sankali Sheri in Khadia, Ahmedabad. During his childhood, he used to publish handwritten weekly Ghar Samachar for his home in which he used to write a title article, about family members, "missing" items and a Gujarati translation of an English novel. He started his primary education in English from Middle Highschool in Bhadra area. Later he joined R. C. Highschool where he completed his matriculation in 1914. He completed B. A. in Sanskrit and English from Gujarat College in 1919. He joined business firm dealing in cloth and cotton yarn. He had close relationship with Sir Chinubhai Baronet and Anandshankar Dhruv.

He received an attention when he wrote an article, Gujaratni Sanskriti Ane Itihasnu Vihangavlokan (Bird's View of Culture and History of Gujarat). Initially he wrote research articles in Kumar magazine. He did research on the Somnath temple when it was re-erected by Vallabhbhai Patel.

He died after prolonged illness around 3:30 pm on 24 September 1955.

== Works ==
Apart from history and culture, he wrote plays, poems and on astrology.

=== History ===
- Amdavadno Parichay (Introduction of Ahmedabad)
- Khambhatno Itihas (History of Cambay; 1935)
- Gujaratno Sanskrutik Itihas (Cultural History of Gujarat)
- Gujaratnu Vahanvatu (Maritime History of Gujarat)
- Gujaratnu Patnagar Amdavad (Ahmedabad: Capital of Gujarat; 1929)
- Gujaratno Sanskrutik Itihas Islam Yug (Cultural History of Gujarat: Islamic Era, Four Volumes)
- Somnath (1949)
- Amdavadnun Sthapatya : Eno Itihas Ane Samanya Ruprekha (Architecture of Ahmedabad: Its History and Timeline; 1929)

=== Others ===
He translated The Admirable Crichton by J. M. Barrie as a Gujarati play Sambhavit Sundarlal (1940). It had two-three shows.

== Recognition ==
Jhote was awarded the Ranjitram Suvarna Chandrak in 1933.
