= Manjulal Majmudar =

Gujarati language writer

- Mañjulāla Raṇachoḍalāla Majamudāra
- Born: Manjulal Ranchhodlal Majmudar; 18 September 1897; Petlad, Gujarat, India
- Died: 11 November 1984 (aged 87); Vadodara, Gujarat, India
- Awards: Ranjitram Suvarna Chandrak

Academic background
- Thesis: Cultural Background of Gujarat Art: Especially its Art of Miniature Painting (1944)
- Doctoral advisor: N. A. Thoothi

Manjulal Ranchhodlal Majmudar (18 September 1897 – 11 November 1984) was a Gujarati language writer and scholar. He was awarded the Ranjitram Suvarna Chandrak in 1968.

== Biography ==
Manjulal Majmudar was born on 18 September 1897 at Petlad (Peṭalāda), in the Anand district of Gujarat, India. Majmudar got his education at Vadodara (Vaḍodarā), Gujarat. He completed his Bachelors in Arts in 1918 with Sanskrit and English Subjects. He completed his LL.B. in 1921 and started his career as a teacher at the National School, Bharuch (Bharūca). He started practicing as a lawyer, but switched careers due to his interest in literature. In May 1928, he joined the Department of Education at Vadodara as the editor of Sayājī Sāhityamālā. In 1929, he was awarded an M.A. by the University of Bombay for his article on the cultural history of Gujarat. At the 7th All India Oriental Conference held at Vadodara in 1933, he presented new discoveries of Vaishnava paintings in Bālagopālastuti and Bhāgavata Daśama Skaṁdha. He joined Baroda College as a professor in 1938. He received the Nārāyaṇa Mahādeva Paramānaṁda award in 1941 for promoting the poetic works of Narsinh Mehta and Mirabai through his article Narasiṁha ane Mīrāṁnāṁ Padono Māravāḍamāṁ Pracāra which was published under a research grant by the University of Bombay. In 1943, he received his Ph.D. from the University of Bombay, writing a thesis on the subject of Cultural Background of Gujarat Art: Especially Miniatures. Later, in 1947, he received the Springer Research Scholarship for three years from the University of Mumbai for the research of Gujarat's slang, sculpture and architecture. He retired from service in 1952. He died on 11 November 1984 at Vadodara, Gujarat.

He was awarded the Ranjitram Suvarna Chandrak of the year 1968.

=== Writing ===
Besides edits, essays and texts, he has authored more than 400 articles, various magazines and publications on Indian culture and Gujarati language literature.

=== Notable works ===
Select works of Majmudar include:

- Mādhavānala-kāmakandalā-prabandha : in two volumes. 1. Gaekwad's Oriental Series. Baroda: Oriental Institute. 1942.
- "Dwārkā Image of Raṇchhoḍjī and the temple at Ḍākore". Journal of the University of Bombay. 16. 1947.
- "Illustrated MSS. of Bilvamaṅgala's Bāla-gōpāla-stuti". Journal of the University of Bombay. Bombay. 1948.
- Sadayavatsa vīra prabandha : aneka hastalikhita pratiyoṃ kī sahāya se saṃśodhita ajñāta kavikṛta "sāvaliṃgā pāṇigrahaṇa caupaī" aura kavi kīrtivardhana racita 'sadayavatsa sāvaliṃgā caupaī' ke pariśiṣṭa aura prastāvanā evaṃ ṭippaṇiyām sahita. Bīkānera: Sādūla Rājasthānī Ris. Inst. 1960.
- Historical and cultural chronology of Gujarat from earliest times to end of the Rāṣṭrakūṭa - Pratikhāra period: i.e. upto 942 A.D.). Baroda: Maharaj Sayajirao Univ. of Baroda. 1960.
- Gujarat : its art-heritage; illustrated with 60 art-plates in monochrome and 11 in colour, and with a map. Bombay: Bombay University. 1968.
- Mīrāṃbāi - eka manana. Sayājī sāhityamāḷā, 332. Vaḍodarā: Prācyavidyā Mandira, Mahārāja Sayājī̄̄rāva Viśvavidyālaya.
- Vaiṣṇavatı̄rtha ḍākora. Sayājī sāhityamāḷā, 362. Vaḍodarā: Prācyavidyā Mandira, Mahārājā Sayājı̄rāva Viśvavidyālaya. 1984.

== See also ==
- List of Gujarati-language writers
