= Bakul Tripathi =

Indian Gujarati author

- Born: 26 November 1928; Nadiad, Gujarat, India
- Died: 31 August 2006 (aged 77); Ahmedabad, Gujarat
- Occupation: Humour essayist
- Writing career
- Language: Gujarati
- Notable awards: Ranjitram Suvarna Chandrak (1988)

Bakul Tripathi (1928–2006) was a Gujarati humour essayist from Gujarat, India. Educated in commerce and law, he taught commerce in Ahmedabad. He wrote thousands of humour essays in columns in his 40 years long career.

== Life ==
Bakul Padmamanishankar Tripathi was born on 27 November 1928 at Nadiad (now in Gujarat, India). He matriculated in 1944. He completed his B.Com. in 1948 and M.Com. in 1953. He completed LL.B. in 1953.

He served as a professor of commerce in H L College of Commerce in Ahmedabad from 1953 to his retirement. He wrote humour columns in Gujarati daily, Gujarat Samachar titled Thoth Nishaliyo and Kakko ne Barakhadi which was the longest run regular column in any daily across India. He also edited international edition of Gujarat Samachar from 1983. He died on 31 August 2006 at Ahmedabad. He was the president of Gujarati Sahitya Parishad when he died.

== Works ==
Tripathi was chiefly humour essayist. He had written thousands of essays in his 40 years long career of column writing but just small number of them are published as collections. Sacharacharma (1955) was his first collection of essays which had novelty in subjects. Somvarni Savare (1966) is his take on affairs of his time and society. Dranacharyanu Sinhasan (1985) has humorous essays about corruption and issues in education system which included various forms of humour. His other essay collections include Vaikunth Nathi Javu (1983), Govinde Mandi Gothdi (1987), Hindolo Zakamzol, Hasya Etle Prabhu Sathe Maitri, Bakul Tripathinu Teramu, India America Hasta Hasta, Haiyu Kholine Hasie, Bapujini Bakrini Bakrini Bakrano Bakro, Batrees Lakshana Bakul Tripathi, Ashadhni Sanje Priya Sakhi Ane Bhajiya, Man Sathe Maitri, Mitrona Chitro, Shakespeare nu Shraddh.

Leela (1974) was his three-act play which had more than fifty shows. Paranu To Ene Ja Paranu is his other play. He had edited one-act plays of Jayanti Dalal and humour essays of Jyotindra Dave. Fantasia was his work of children's literature. He had written few critical essays.

== Recognition ==
He received Kumar Chandrak in 1951. He had also received Ranjitram Suvarna Chandrak in 1988.

== Personal life ==
He was married and had a daughter.

== See also ==
- List of Gujarati-language writers
