= Ramsinhji Rathod =

Indian scholar and forester

Ramsinhji Kanjibha Rathod
- Born: 8 December 1917; Bhuvad, Cutch State, British India (now in Kutch district, Gujarat, India)
- Died: 25 June 1997 (aged 79); Bhuj, Kutch district
- Occupations: Scholar, forester
- Writing career
- Language: Gujarati
- Notable awards: Sahitya Akademi Award (1961); Ranjitram Suvarna Chandrak (1962)

Ramsinhji Kanjibha Rathod (8 December 1917 – 25 June 1997) was an Indian forester and scholar known for his extensive studies on the history, geography, archaeology, folklore, art, and geology of Kutch district of Gujarat, India.

== Early life and education ==
Rathod was born in Bhuvad in Cutch State (now in Kutch district) on 8 December 1917. His parents were Kanjibhai and Tejbai. He completed matriculation with the first class in 1933 in Bhuj. He collaborated with a friend to produce a handwritten monthly Bansari.

In 1935, the Cutch State sent him to the Imperial Forest Research Institute in Dehradun. He obtained a diploma in forestry in 1937. On recommendation of Dr. Rajnath, the head of the Geology Department at Banaras Hindu University, the Cutch State sent him to Banaras Hindu University for advanced studies in geology where he completed M.Sc. in geology in 1949.

== Career ==
Following his forestry diploma, Rathod was appointed as a Range Forest Officer in the Cutch State's forest department. After completing his M.Sc., he was appointed as the Forest Superintendent of Cutch State. He held various posts including head of the Forest Department, Special Forest Officer, Divisional Forest Officer in Gujarat. Later he served as a Forest Officer in the Indian Forest Service.

During his career in the forest service, he studied folk arts, folklore, history, geography, geology, and archaeology of Kutch. He studied ruins, ancient ports, temples and shrines, paliyas (memorial stones) and mosques. He documented stories, legends, history, geography as well as collected related maps, pictures, and photographs. He established Bharatiya Sanskruti Darshan, a museum in Bhuj.

Based on his extensive travel and research in Kutch, he published a series of articles in Kumar. These articles were later compiled and published as a book titled Kutch nu Sanskrutidarshan (Cultural Insight of Kutch) in 1959. His another book Gujarati Bhashama Bhantar Tatha Gujarati Sahitya (Education in Gujarati Language and Gujarati Literature) discusses the Kutchi language. He authored Kutch and Ramarandh (1992) about Kutchi folk arts, performing arts and literature on Kutchi Ramayana called Ramarandh.

In 1961, he received the Sahitya Akademi Award in Gujarati for Kutch nu Sanskrutidarshan. He was awarded the Ranjitram Suvarna Chandrak in 1962 for the same book.

He died on 25 June 1997 in Bhuj.

== See also ==
- List of Gujarati-language writers
