= Amrut Ghayal =

Gujarati poet

Amrut 'Ghayal'
- Born: 19 August 1916; Sardhar, Rajkot, Gujarat, India
- Died: 25 December 2002 (aged 86); Rajkot, Gujarat, India

Amrutlal Laljee Bhatt (1916–2002), better known by his pen name Amrut Ghayal, was a Gujarati language poet from India.

== Life ==
Amrutlal Bhatt was born in Sardhar, near Rajkot, on 19 August 1916, to Lalji Bhatt and Santokben. He studied up to the seventh standard in Sardhar. He served as personal secretary to the prince of Pajod state, a small princely state of Saurashtra, Khan Imamuddin Babi aka Ruswa Majhalumi, from 1938 to 1948. He passed matriculation in 1949 and joined a Bachelor of Arts at Dharmendrasinhji Arts College, Rajkot, but left his studies after the first year. He joined the Public Works Department of Rajkot in 1949 as an accountant and retired in 1973. He settled in Rajkot following his retirement.

He died on 25 December 2002 at Rajkot.

== Works ==
His pen name Ghayal literally means wounded. Already a scholar of Urdu and Persian poetry, Ghayal became a Ghazal poet of Gujarati by 1940. His poetry is known for "Jusso" (morale), "Jom" (spirit), and "Mijaj" (attitude or style). His language drew on the vocabulary of Saurashtra region, where he belonged.

In 1954, he published his first poetry collection Shula ane Shamana (Thorns and Dreams). His other collections are Rang (Colour, 1960), Roop (Beauty, 1967), Jhay (Shade, 1982), Agni (Fire, 1982) and Gazal Name Sukh (Happiness in name of poetry, 1984).

== Awards ==
He received the Sheikhadam Abuwala Award for 1992–93. He was also awarded Ranjitram Suvarna Chandrak in 1993 and Gujarat Sahitya Akademi award in 1994. He received the Kalapi Award in 1997.
