= Ranjitram Mehta =

Gujarati writer

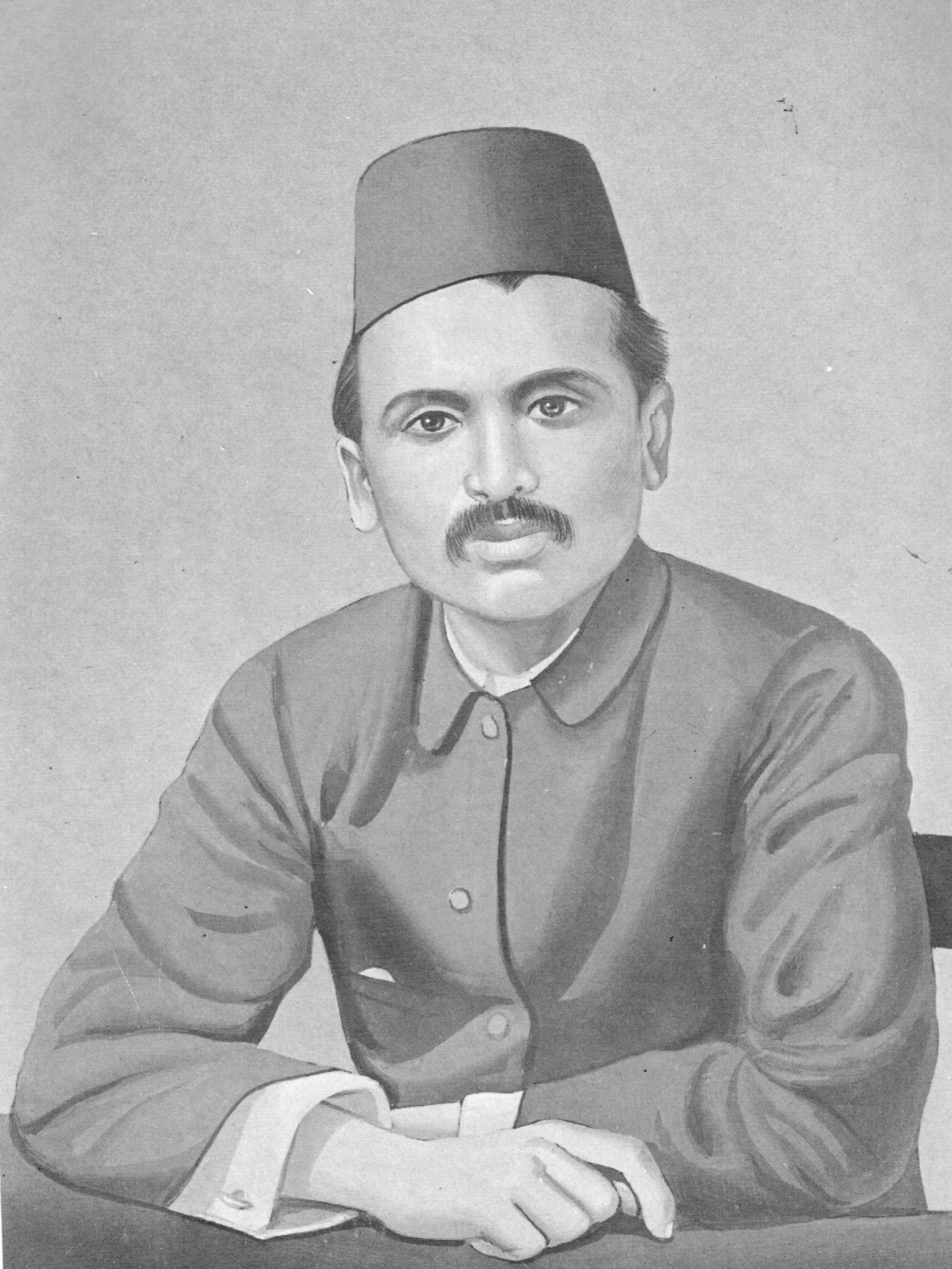
- Portrait of Ranjitram Mehta
- Born: 25 October 1881; Surat, Bombay Presidency, British India (present-day Gujarat, India)
- Died: 4 June 1917 (aged 35); Bombay, British India
- Education: Bachelor of Arts
- Alma mater: Gujarat College
- Occupations: Researcher, writer
- Children: Asoka Mehta
- Writing career
- Language: Gujarati
- Notable work: Ranjitram Gadyasanchay 1-2 (1982)

Ranjitram Vavabhai Mehta (25 October 1881 – 4 June 1917) was a Gujarati language writer from British India.

== Biography ==
Bust of Mehta at Gujarati Sahitya Parishad, Ahmedabad

Ranjitram Mehta was born on 25 October 1881 in Surat to Vavabhai. He completed his schooling in Ahmedabad where his father was the Chief Engineer of the Ahmedabad Municipal Committee. He completed Bachelor of Arts from Gujarat College in 1903 and served as a fellow for eight months. From 1906 to 1917, he served as a personal assistant of Prof. Gajjar and Prabhashankar Pattani, Dewan of Bhavnagar State. He had served as principal of high school at Umreth in 1905.

He founded Gujarat Sahitya Sabha in 1904 and Gujarati Sahitya Parishad in 1905. He died on 4 June 1917 by drowning in sea at Juhu beach. The highest award of Gujarati literature and culture, Ranjitram Suvarna Chandrak, is named after him.

His son Asoka Mehta (1911-1984) was an Indian independence activist and socialist politician.

== Works ==
Mehta worked in different genres of literature such as essay, novel, drama and short story. Ranjitkruti Sangrah, a collection of his writings, was published posthumously in 1921 by K. M. Munshi. Ranjitramna Nibandho, a collection of his essays, was also published posthumously in 1923. Gujarat Sahitya Parishad published his complete work as Ranjitram Gadyasanchay 1-2 in 1982 on his birth centenary. Gujarati Sahitya Akademi has published Ranjitram Vavavbhai ane Temnu Sahitya. His Ahmad Rupande (1908) was a love story between Hindu girl and Muslim boy. In 1905, he had coined the Gujarati words Lokgeet and Lokkatha for folklore in a paper presented at Gujarati Sahitya Parishad.

== See also ==
- List of Gujarati-language writers
