= Ardeshar Khabardar =

Parsi Gujarati poet (1881–1953) who wrote under the pen name Adal

Ardeshar Faramji Khabardar
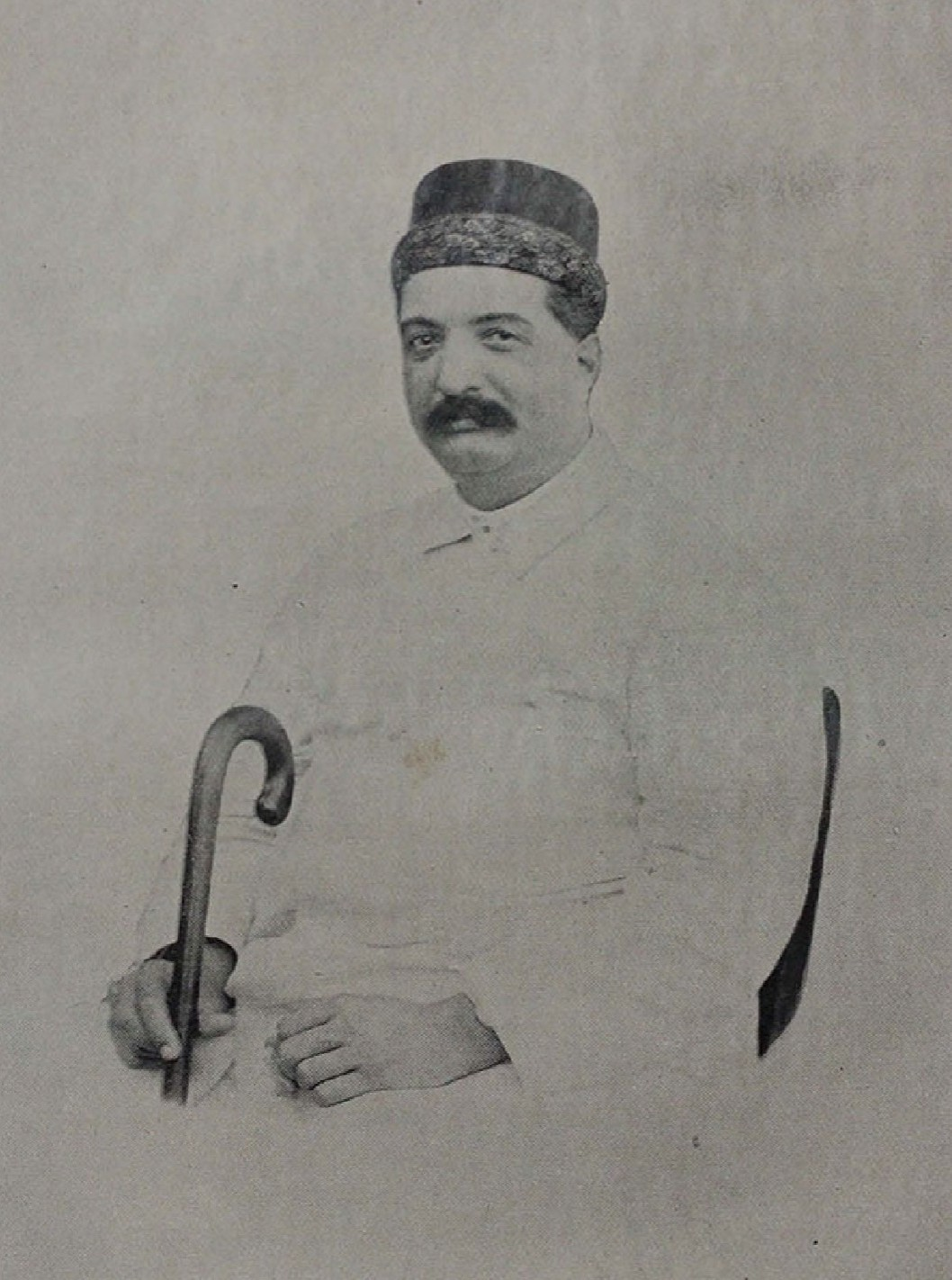
- Born: 6 November 1881; Daman, Portuguese India
- Died: 30 July 1953 (aged 71); Madras, India
- Occupation: poet
- Writing career
- Pen name: Adal
- Language: Gujarati
- Notable works: Kavyarasika (1901); Rasachandrika (1929, 1941)

Ardeshar Faramji Khabardar, also spelled Ardeshir Pharamji Khabardar, was a Parsi poet from India. He wrote mainly in Gujarati but also in English and Marathi. He wrote under the pen name Adal. Living in Bombay and Madras, he wrote in different styles of poetry and published around forty books. He also wrote sonnets about his religion, Zoroastrianism.

== Life ==
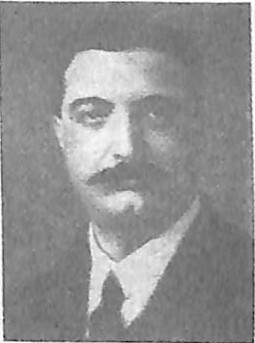
Khabardar

Ardeshar was born in a Parsi family in Daman on 6 November 1881. He had primary education in Daman and secondary education from New Bharda High School, Bombay. He started a motorcycle accessories business in Madras in 1909. He presided over Gujarati Sahitya Parishad in 1941. He died in Madras on 30 July 1953.

== Works ==
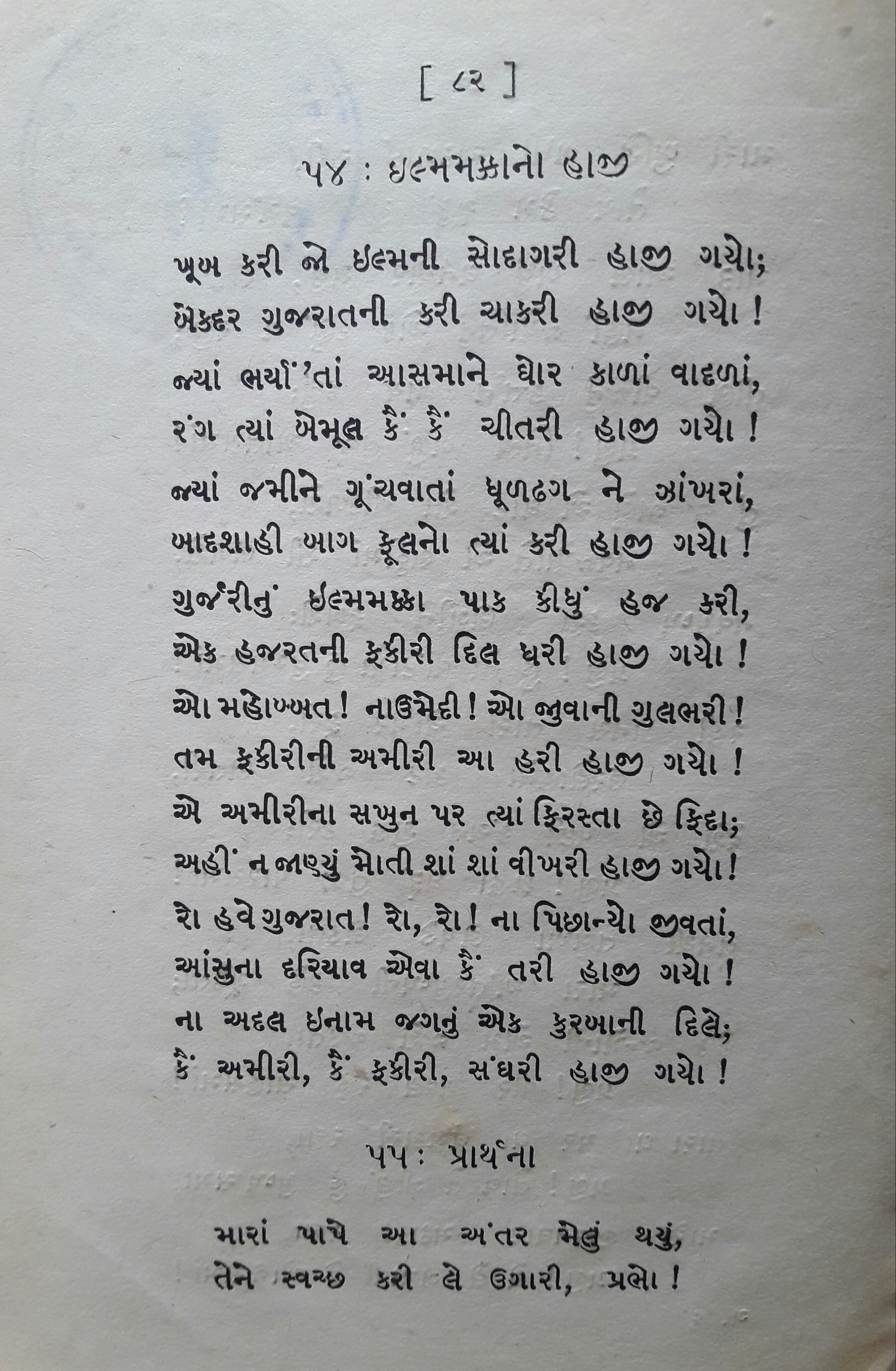
Ilmamakka No Haji, a ghazal written by Khabardar from the book "Gujarat Ni Ghazalo" (1943) edited by Krishnalal Jhaveri (p.82)

He wrote under several pen names, chiefly under Adal. His other pen names are Motalal, Khojo Bhagat, Kshemanand Bhatt, Narkesarirao, Shabhunath, Shridhar, Sheshadri, Lakha Bhagat, Valkalrai Thatthakhor, and Hunnarsinh Mehta. He wrote around forty books in Gujarati and two in English.

His Gujarati poem, Jya Jya Vase Ek Gujarati, Tya Tya Sadakal Gujarat (Wherever a Gujarati resides, there forever is Gujarat), depicts Gujarati ethnic pride and is widely popular in Gujarat.

He wrote in modern Gujarati instead of Parsi Gujarati. His first work was the poetry collection Kavyarasika, which followed the style of Dalpatram, in 1901. Vilasika, published in 1905, followed the style of Narsinhrao Divetia. Prakashika (1908) is styled as the works of Kalapi and Kant. Bharat no Tankar (1909) and Rashtrika (1940) are collections of patriotic songs. He parodied and satirised Gujarat no Tapasvi and Brahmadiksha of Nanalal as Prabhat no Tapasvi and Kutkutdiksha (1920) under the pen name Motalal. Sandeshika (1925) includes patriotic songs. His Kalika (1926) is a love song in blank verse style. Bhajanika (1928), Darshanika (1931), and Kalyanika (1940) are collections of devotional songs. Rasachandrika (1929, 1941) is a collection of rasa songs in the style of Nanalal and Botadkar. Shriji Iranshah no Pawado depicts the history of Zorostrianism and Gandhi Bapu no Pawado praises Mahatma Gandhi; both are poetry in the Marathi powada style. Gandhi Bapu (1948) also has thirty-one songs dedicated to Gandhi. His last collection, Kirtanika, had seventy-five kirtan songs. He also published Malabari na Kavyaratno, an interpretation of poems of Behramji Malabari in 1913.

His only English-language poetry collection, The Silken Tassel (1918), had fifty-nine poems. He wrote New Light on the Gathas of Holy Zarathushtra and Zarathushtra: 101 Sonnets, depicting the life and teaching of Zoroaster.

He started writing a play titled Manuraj or Vishwanatika styled on Goethe's Faust and Nanalal's free verse in 1936 but never completed or published.

== Publications ==
=== Gujarati ===
- કાવ્યરસિકા [Kavyarasika]. 1901.
- વિલાસિકા [Vilasika]. 1905.
- પ્રકાશિકા [Prakashika]. 1908.
- ભારતનો ટંકાર [Bharat no Tankar]. 1909.
- સંદેશિકા [Sandeshika]. 1925.
- કાલિકા [Kalika]. 1926.
- ભજનિકા [Bhajanika]. 1928.
- રાસચંદ્રિકા [Rasachandrika] (in Gujarati). 1929 – via Wikisource.
- દર્શનિકા [Darshanika]. 1931.
- રાષ્ટ્રિકા [Rashtrika] (in Gujarati). 1940 – via Wikisource.
- કલ્યાણિકા [Kalyanika] (in Gujarati). 1940 – via Wikisource.
- નંદનિકા [Nandanika]. 1944.
- ગાંધીબાપુ [Gandhi Bapu]. 1948.
- કીર્તનિકા [Kirtanika].

=== English ===
- Ardeshir F. Khabardar (1918). The Silken Tassel . Theosophical Pub. House – via Wikisource.
- Ardeshir F. Khabardar (1950). Zarathushtra, the first prophet of the world: 101 sonnets.
- Aradeśara Pharāmajī Khabaradāra (1990). The Rest House of the Spirit. Ajit Prakashan.
- Aradeśara Pharamājī Khabaradāra (1990). Leaf & Flower. Ajit Prakashan.
- Aradeśara Pharāmajī Khabaradāra (1990). The Migrating Bird. Ajit Prakashan on behalf of A.F. Khabardar Birth-Centenary Publications.

== See also ==
- List of Gujarati-language writers
