= C. N. Patel =

Indian writer from Gujarat (1918–2004)

- Born: Chimanlal Narandas Patel; 23 December 1918; Asarwa, Ahmedabad, Gujarat
- Died: 30 January 2004 (aged 85)
- Occupations: Writer, literary critic and translator
- Writing career
- Language: Gujarati, English
- Notable awards: Ranjitram Suvarna Chandrak (2000)

Chimanlal Narandas Patel (23 December 1918 – 30 January 2004) was an Indian writer, literary critic and translator from Gujarat, India. He received the Ranjitram Suvarna Chandrak in 2000 for his contribution to Gujarati literature.

== Biography ==
C. N. Patel was born on 23 December 1918 at Asarwa, a village in Ahmedabad, Gujarat. He completed his BA in 1940 with English major and Sanskrit minor, and MA in 1944 with English.

From 1944 to 1961, he served as a lecturer of English at Gujarat College in Ahmedabad. During 1956–1957, he served as a registrar of Sardar Patel University in Vallabh Vidyanagar. During 1959–1961, he was deputed as a principal of Prakash Arts College for Girls in Ahmedabad.

He died on 30 January 2004.

== Works ==
Patel was known as Chi. Na. Patel (C. N. Patel) in Gujarati literature.

His first book Abhikram (1975) is a work of literary criticism, which was followed by Tragedy – Sahityama ane Jivanma (1978) and Kathabodh (1980).

He wrote several books on Mahatma Gandhi, which include Gandhiji Ni Satyasadhana ane Bija Lekho (1978), Gandhiji (1979; part of Gujarati Granthakar series), Mahatma Gandhi in His Gujarati Writings (1981), A Gandhi Reader (1983), and Gandhicharit (1995). His other books are Vicharatarnag (1986), Moral and Social Thinking in Modern Gujarat (1988), Buddhiprakash : Swadhyay ane Suchi (1990), and Mari Vismaykatha. He served as translator, deputy chief editor, and advisor for The Collected Works of Mahatma Gandhi book series.

He translated Valmiki's Ramayana into Gujarati in abridged version titled Valmikiya Ramakatha (1982).

== Awards ==
Patel received the Ranjitram Suvarna Chandrak in 2000 for his contribution to Gujarati literature. He received an award from Government of Gujarat (1996–97) for his service to education.

== See also ==
- List of Gujarati-language writers
