= Joravarsinh Jadav =

Indian folklorist (1940–2025)

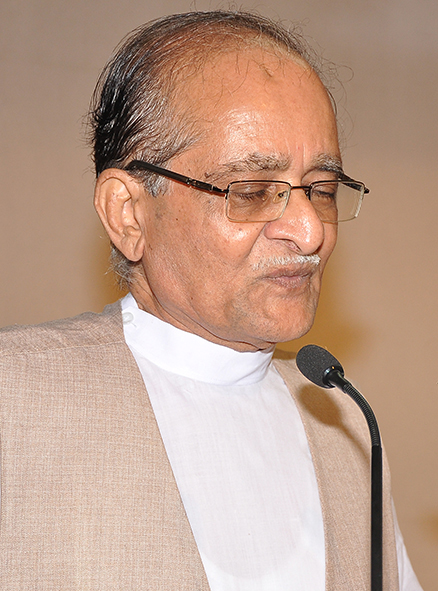
- Born: 10 January 1940; Akru, Dhandhuka, Bombay Province, British India
- Died: 7 November 2025 (aged 85); Ahmedabad, Gujarat, India
- Occupations: Vice-chairman of Sangeet Natak Academi, Folklorist
- Spouse: Sajjankunwarba (m. 1963; died 1968) Hemkunwarba (m. 1969)
- Writing career
- Language: Gujarati
- Notable awards: Padma Shri (2019)

Signature
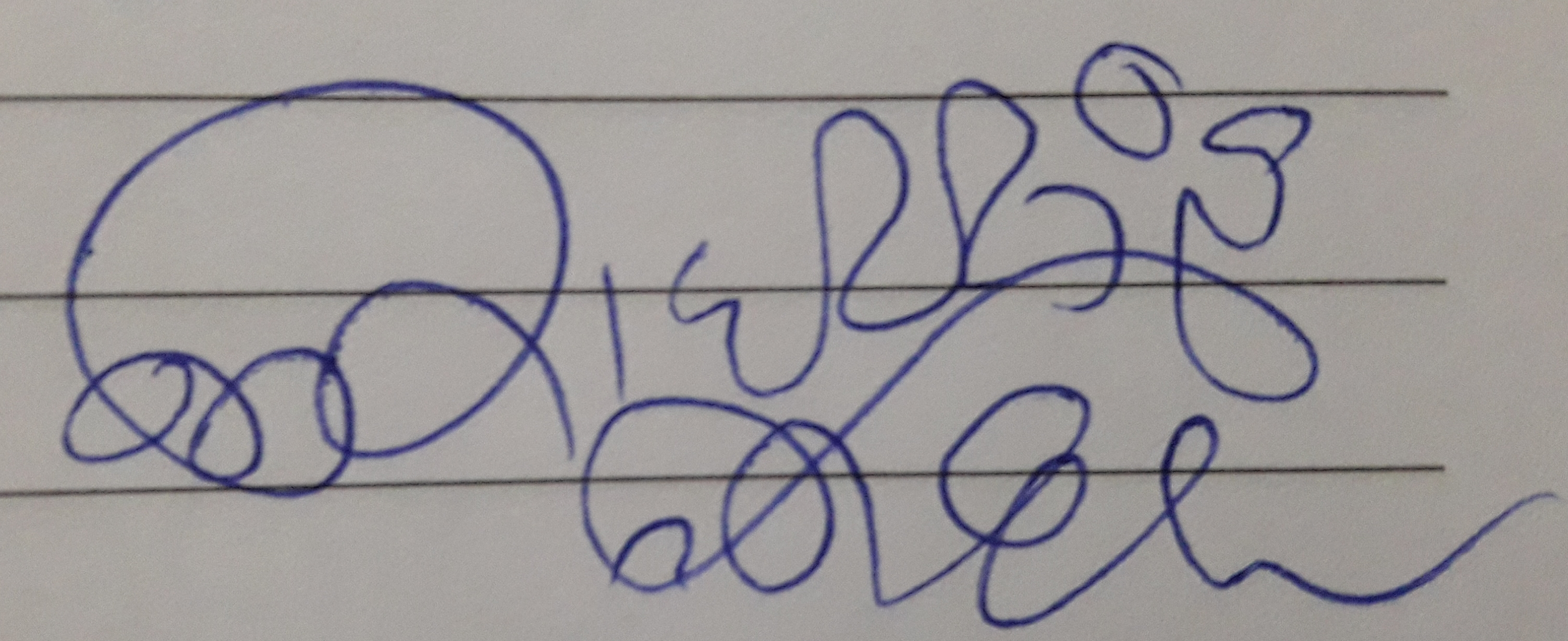

Joravarsinh Danubhai Jadav (10 January 1940 – 7 November 2025) was an Indian folklorist and proponent of the folk arts from Gujarat. Exposed to folk culture as a child, he studied history and culture in Ahmedabad. He wrote and edited more than 90 works on folk culture, folk literature, and folk arts. He established the Gujarat Lok Kala Foundation for the promotion of folk arts. He was awarded the Padma Shri in 2019. He was also the Vice-chairman of the Sangeet Natak Akademi.

== Early life ==
Jadav was born on 10 January 1940 in Akru village near Dhandhuka, Bombay Province (now in Ahmedabad district, Gujarat) to a Rajput Jagirdar family. His parents were Danubhai Halubhai Jadav and Pamba. He was the second of six children. He was raised by his stepmother, Gangaba.

He was exposed to folk literature and folk arts as a child due to his living in a rural area. He received his primary school education in his village and in Sheth Hasanali High School in Dholka. He received his secondary school education from Gujarat Vidyapith in 1956–57. In 1961, he completed his bachelor of arts degree in Gujarati language and History at St. Xavier's College, Ahmedabad.

Jadav found the remains of a Late Harappan site on a mound near the Khalavi lake near his native village of Akru. This whetted his interest in archaeology and history, and he completed his master of arts in Ancient Indian Culture at the Bholabhai Jeshingbhai Institute of Learning and Research, Ahmedabad, in 1963. His interests in folk literature, folk culture, and folk arts developed further during these years.

== Career ==
After completing his master's degree, he became a teacher of Gujarati at Panchsheel High School in Saraspur, Ahmedabad. He left and joined St. Xavier's College as a part-time lecturer. In 1964, he joined the Sahkar weekly published by the Gujarat State Co-operative Union as a publication officer. He was later promoted to the post of chief executive officer in 1994 and served there until his retirement in 1998. He also edited and published the Gramswaraj monthly and edited the Jinmangal monthly.

Jadav popularised folk arts and patronised folk artists by promoting them on various mass media sites, including television and radio. In 1978, he established the Gujarat Lok Kala Foundation for the promotion of the folk arts and to give folk artists from Gujarat and Rajasthan wider exposure and employment. The Foundation provided a platform for folk artists at the national and international levels.

== Personal life and death ==
Jadav married Sajjankunwar, the daughter of Vadansinh Chavda, in May 1963. They had two daughters before his wife died in an accident in 1968. Jadav then married Hemkunwar, the daughter of Pethabhai Solanki, in 1969; they had two daughters and a son.

Jadav died on 7 November 2025, at the age of 85.

== Works ==
As of 2019, Jadav had written and edited 110 Books on folk literature, folk culture, and folk arts. Since 1958, his articles on folk literature and folk arts have been published in various magazines and dailies, including Buddhiprakash, Nutan Gujarat, Rang Tarang, Akhand Anand, Sandesh, and Gujarat Samachar.

His collections of folk stories set in a rural background are Marad Kasumbal Rang Chade (1968), Maradai Matha Sate (1970), Loksahityani Chaturaikathao (1974), and Rajput Kathao (1979). His collections of children's stories include Bhatigal Lokkathao (1973) and Manoranjak Kathamala (1977). His reference works on folk literature and arts include Aapna Kasabio (1972), Lokjivanna Moti (1975), Gujaratni Loksanskriti (1976), Loksanskritina Pashuo (1979), and Prachin Bharatna Shastrashastro (1981). For Gujarati Loksahityamala (Gujarati Folk Literature Series), he edited folk songs from the Bhal region. He has edited several works of folk literature, including Saje Dharati Shangar (1972), Loksahityani Nagkathao (1973), and Gujaratni Lokkathao (1984).

== Recognition ==
Jadav was awarded the Meghani Suvarna Chandrak in 1978 by the Loksanskriti Sodh Sansthan for his work Lokjivanna Moti. The Gujarat Sahitya Akademi awarded a prize for his Loksanskritima Pashuo. Aapna Kasabio Volume I received the first prize from the NCERT, and Doshino Deekro Bayadi Lavyo received a prize from the Government of Gujarat.

In 2019, Jadav was awarded the Padma Shri, the fourth highest civilian honour from the Government of India, for his contributions to the field of art.

== See also ==
- List of Gujarati-language writers
