= Jashwant Thaker =

Indian actor, director (1915–1990)

- Born: 5 May 1915; Mahelav, Anand district, Gujarat, British Raj
- Died: 25 December 1990 (aged 75); Ahmedabad, Gujarat, India
- Education: B.A.
- Alma mater: Elphinstone College
- Occupations: playwright, director, theatre actor
- Children: Aditi Desai (daughter)
- Awards: Sangeet Natak Akademi Award (1968); Ranjitram Suvarna Chandrak (1977)

Jashwant Thaker (5 May 1915 – 25 December 1990) was an Indian actor, playwright and director of Gujarati theatre. He directed and acted in several successful plays. He was awarded the Sangeet Natak Akademi Award in 1968, the Ranjitram Suvarna Chandrak in 1977 and the Soviet Land Award in 1986.

== Biography ==
Jashwant Thaker was born on 5 May 1915 in Mehlav in Kaira district to Dayashankar Thaker and Lalitabahen. His father's career as a city survey officer led him to take his primary education in Nadiad and Jamnagar. He completed his matriculation from Nadiad. Due to his interest in art, in 1928, he studied at music school in Jamnagar. At the age of fifteen, he joined the freedom struggle and established Abhedyamandal. In 1932, Thaker joined the B.J. Medical College, Ahmedabad but dropped out of study to join nationalist activities. In 1936, he joined the Arts department of M.T.B. College, Surat. In 1938, he received a B.A. degree from Elphinstone College, Mumbai. He was arrested for his participation in anti-war conferences. During his three years in prison, he studied theatrical literature. He was one of the initial members of Indian People's Theatre Association (IPTA). In 1943, he established the Gujarat branch of IPTA. In 1949–50, he left political activities and adopted the field of drama as his career.

He died on 25 December 1990 in Ahmedabad. His daughter, Aditi Desai, is also a theatre director.

== Career ==
Thaker staged many Gujarati plays including Unda Andhare Thi, Dukhi no Beli, Mudrarakshas, Mushak ane Manushya. After eighteen plays, he joined as head of the theater department of Maharaja Sayajirao University of Baroda in 1950. In 1951, he left the department and went to Rajkot to stage a play by Gunvantrai Acharya. Then he rejoined university and between 1955 and 1960, he continued to direct various plays by Shakespeare and Anton Chekhov. Bhagat ni Samadhi, Matimathi Sonu, Rajiya Sulatana, Ganga Par Ek Rat are his famous plays. He visited several theaters and met artists from across the country and abroad for the development of stage plays. He was dedicated to theater and direction. He directed more than 125 plays in Sanskrit, English and Gujarati languages and also acted in some plays.

Natya Shikshn na Mool Tattvo (Basic Elements of Theatre Education) (1957), Natya Prayog Shilp (The Structure of Thearitical Experiments) (1959), and Loknatya ane Gamadun (Folk Theatre and Village) (1960) are his educational books.

== Legacy ==
The Jashwant Thaker Memorial Foundation, an NGO which works for children, women, and Gujarati language, was founded in Ahmedabad in honour of Thaker. In 2012, a documentary, Rangbhumina Kalakar, based on Thaker was made and presented by his daughter, Aditi Desai, at Fanatika Theatre Club's documentary festival.
