= Sardhar =

Coordinates: 22.1359548°N 70.9775161°E

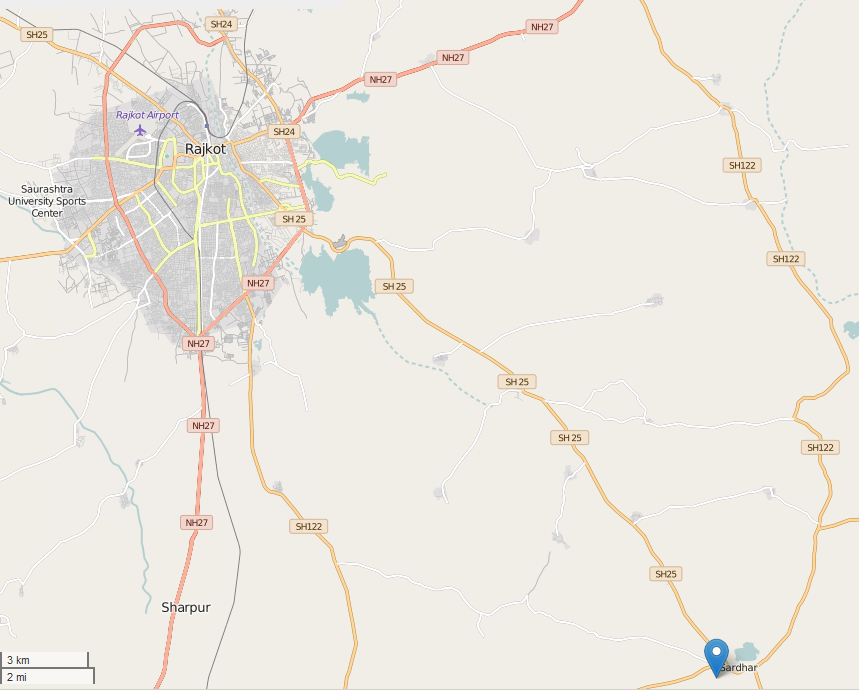
Location of Sardhar 30 km (18.6 miles) south-east of Rajkot

Sardhar is a village located on the Rajkot to Bhavnagar highway and 30 km (18.6 miles) away from Rajkot in the state of Gujarat, India.

== Name ==
Sardhar is said to derive its name from the Sardbnri Dhar, a long trap dyke, which is one of the principal watersheds of the centre of Kathiawar. As the town was at the head or beginning of the dhar or dyke it was called Sardhar or head of the dhar or dyke. The dyke consists of columnar basalt and has a length of approximately 50 km (more than 30 miles) at a height of 12–30 m (40–100 feet).

== Infrastructure ==
Sardhar is well connected via road being at the crossroads of Highway 25 and Highway 122. The village has all the base amenities such as a bank, a post office, a petrol pump, a police station and a local market.

Sprawling Swaminarayan Mandir Sardhar (Sardhar dham) and prusti sampraday mandir known as Balkrushna haveli and Kashipara Parivar Math are notable temples.

== Nature ==
The Aji River has its source in the hilly areas halfway between Sardhar and Rajkot.

== Population ==
The population according to the census of 1872 was 2,922 inhabitants and according to that of 1881 was 2,805 inhabitants.

Now, according to the Population Census of 2011, the population of the village is around 8,137, of which 3,878 are females and 4,259 are males in a total of 1,607 families.

3,567 people were engaged in main activities, of whom at least 1,044 were cultivators owning or co-owning fields and 616 were agricultural labourers. 91.5% of workers describe their work as main work (being employed or earning income for more than six months) while 8.5% were involved in marginal activity (providing livelihood for less than six months).

== History ==
Sardhar was held by the Vaghelas for many years and was in their possession at the time of Akbar. However, the city was lost to the Vaghelas after constant raids by the Muhanimadans.

In the 1880s Sardhar was famous for iron oil vessels manufactured by the local smiths.

== Notable people ==
- Amrut Ghayal, a Gujarati language poet, was born in Sardhar on 30 September 1915.

== Codes ==
- The PIN Code for the village is 360025
- The Telephone Code is 0281
