= Keshavram Kashiram Shastri =

Indian right-wing group leader

- Born: July 28, 1905; Mangrol, Gujarat, India
- Died: September 9, 2006 (Aged 101); Ahmedabad, India
- Organization: Vishwa Hindu Parishad

Signature
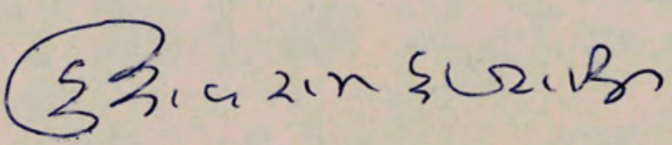

Keshavram Kashiram Bambhaniya (Gujarati (ISO 15919): Keśavarāma Kāśīrāma Śāstrī), also known as K. K. Shastri, was a scholar of Gujarat, India.

== Biography ==
Shastri completed his school up to matriculation (conclusion of secondary education) and then was taught Sanskrit grammar, poetry, and Vedānta by his father, Kāśīrāma Karaśanajī Śāstrī (Bāṁbhaṇiyā). He then spent 1923 as a teacher in Caṁdavāṇā, a village near Mangrol, Gujarat, following which he served as a part-time teacher in his father's Sanskrit school. He then spent 11 years as an assistant teacher in Coronation High School in Mangrol.

In 1936 he moved to Ahmedabad and became an editor of Prajābaṁdhu, a Gujarati weekly, and in the following year joined the Gujarat Vernacular Society as a researcher. In 1939, he began teaching postgraduate courses on Apabhraṃśa and Old Gujarati literature. In 1944, the University of Bombay gave him permission to give M.A. exams, and in 1955 gave permission to advise PhD students and taught at the university for 42 years. He also served as an adjunct professor at Balabhai Damodardas Women's College in Ahmedabad from 1961 to 1971. Since 1960, he served as an honorary professor at the B. J. Institute of Learning in Ahmedabad.

He was a mentor to the current Prime Minister of India- Narendra Modi.

== Achievements ==
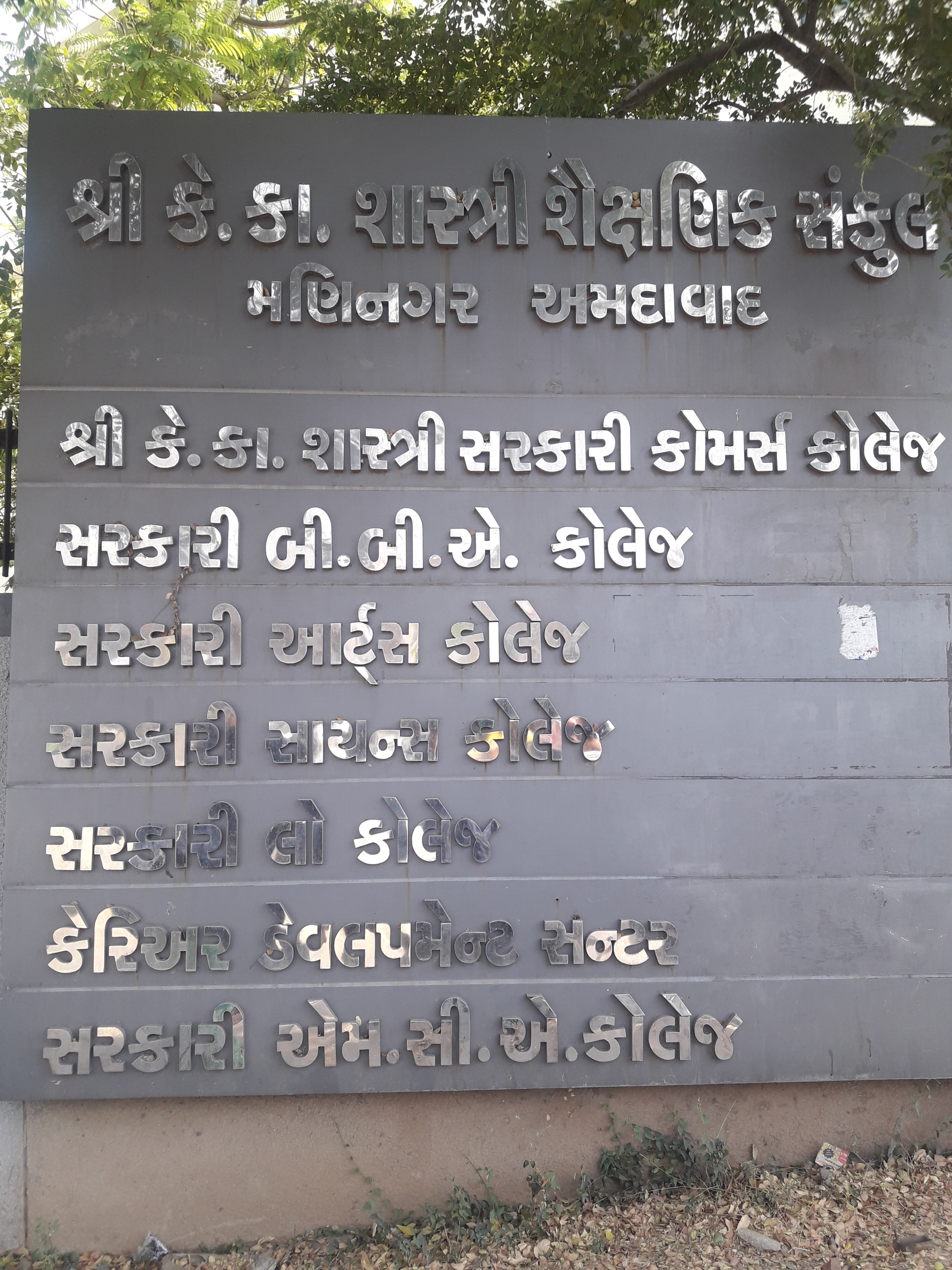
K K Shastri Educational Campus, located in Maninagar, is named after him

In 1952 he was awarded the Ranjitram Suvarna Chandrak (Ranjitram Gold Medal) by the Gujarat Sahitya Sabha for his lifetime research on Gujarati literature and grammar. In 1976 he was awarded the Padma Shri by the President of India, Fakhruddin Ali Ahmed for his studies in grammar and linguistics.

== Death ==
He died September 9, 2006, in Ahmedabad at the age of 101.

== Books ==
Shastri's prominent publications are as under,

- Śrī Mahābhārata : Gūjarātī padyabandha. Mumbaī: Śrī Phārbasa Gūjarātī Sabhā. 1933.
- Prabodha-prakāśa. Amadāvāda: Gujarāta Varnākyulara Sosāyaṭī. 1936.
- Gujarātī hāthapratonī saṅkalita yādi : sane 1937 sudhīnī. Amadāvāda: Gujarāta Varṇākyulara Sosāyaṭī. 1937.
- Āpaṇā kavio. Amadāvāda: Gujarāta Varnākyulara Sosāyaṭī. 1942.
- Akṣara ane śabda : tadviṣayaka raca lekhono saṅgraha. Amadāvāda: Gujarāta Sāhitya Sabhā. 1945.
- Dalapata-kāvya-navanīta. Amadāvāda: Gujarāta Vidyāsabhā. 1949.
- Apabhraṃśa-vyākaraṇa : Siddhahaimaśabdānuśāsanāntargata-Prākr̥tavyākaraṇaṃśabhūta. Amadāvāda: Gujārāta Vidyāsabhā. 1949.
- Alaṅkārādarsa. Amadāvāda: Gujarāta Vidyāsabhā. 1949.
- Hāra-samenāṃ pada ane hāramāḷā. Mumbaī: Phārbasa Gujarātī Sabhā. 1950.
- Kavicarita. Amadāvāda: Gujarāta Vidyāsabhā. 1952.
- Gujarāti rūparacanā uparanāṃ pāñca bhāshaṇa, Ī. Sa. 1952. Mumbaī: Śrī Phārbasa Gujarātī Sabhā. 1958.
- Premānanda: eka adhyayana. Amadāvāda: Gujarāta Vidyāsabhā. 1958–1964.
- Bhāshāśāstra ane Gujarātī bhāshā; traṇa vyākhyāno. Vallabhavidyānagara: Saradāra Paṭela Yunivarsiṭī. 1969.
- Narasiṃha Maheto : eka adhyayana. Amadāvāda: Bho. Je. Vidyābhavana. 1971.
- Nalākhyāna : prastāvanā ane vistr̥ta śabdakośa sahita. Vaḍodarā: Gujarātī Vibhāga, Mahārājā Sayājirāva Viśvavidyālaya. 1975.
- Nāma-liṅgānuśāsana : kiṃvā, Amara-kośa (Amara-kosha). Amadāvāda: Yunivarsiṭī Granthanirmāṇa Borḍa. 1975.
- Br̥had Gujarātī kośa. Amadāvāda: Yunivarsiṭī Granthanirmāṇa Borḍa, Gujarāta Rājya. 1976–1981.
- Jayasaṃhita, kiṃvā, Ādibhāratam [The Jaya-saṁhitā, i.e., the Ur-Mahābhārata]. Bombay: Gujarat Research Society. 1977.
- Śrīvallabhācārya mahāprabhujī : aitihyamūlaka jīvanī. Śrī Sayājī sāhityamāḷā. Vaḍodarā: Prācyavidyā Mandira, Mahārājā Sayājīrāva Viśvavidyālaya. 1977.
- Gujarātanā sārasvato : Gujarāta Sāhitya Sabhānī ṣaṣṭipūrti aṅge enā āja sudhīnā ahevāla sāthe. Amadāvāda: Gujarāta Sāhitya Sabhā. 1977.
- The Hari-vaṁśa : abridged edition. Poona: Bhandarkar Oriental Research Institute. 1978.
- Vanauṣadhi-kośa. Vaḍodarā: Prācyavidyā Mandira, Mahārāja Sayājīrāva Viśvavidyālaya. 1982.
- Śrībhāgavatam : Śrīmad Bhāgavata-mahāpurāṇam : samīkṣita āvr̥tti. Ahamadābāda: Śeṭha Bholābhāī Jeśiṅgabhāī Adhyayana-Saṃśodhana Vidyābhavana. 1996–2002.
- Śrīvāllabha siddhānta. Gāndhīnagara: Saṃskr̥ta Sāhitya Akādamī. 1998.
- Sāhityānveshaṇa : Adhyā. Ḍô. Keśavarāma Kā. Śāstrī ke 22 Hindī-nibandha. Gāndhīnagara: Hindī Sāhitya Akādamī. 1998.
- Dhoḷa. Amadāvāda: Gujarāta Risarca Sosāyaṭī. 1999.
- Bhāṇadāsanā garabā. Amadāvāda: Gujarāta Risarca Sosāyaṭī. 1999.
- Joḍaṇī-mīmāṃsā : lekha-saṅgraha. Amadāvāda: Gujarata Risarca Sosāyaṭī. 1999.
- Bambāʼivālā, Muḥīuddīn (1999). Urdū-Gujarātī śabdakośa / Urdū Gujarātī lug̳h̳at. Gāndhīnagara: Urdū Sāhitya Akādamī. (collaborative)
- Mudrārākshasa, kiṃvā, Mhore mhāta. Amadāvāda: Śeṭha Bholābhāī Jeśiṅgabhāī Adhyayana-Saṃśodhana Vidyābhavana. 2000.
- Gujarātī uccāraṇa-mīmāṃsā. Amadāvāda: Gujarāta Risarca Sosāyaṭī. 2001.
- Bhāsapraṇītaṃ Pratimādaśaratham : nāṭakam (Saṁśuddhā 2 ed.). Amadāvāda: Bho. Je. Adhyayana-Saṃśodhana-Vidyābhavanam. 2002.
- Uttarakālīna Apabhraṃśa kā vikāsa. Gāndhīnagara: Hindī Sāhitya Akādamī. 2002.
- Hariścandrākhyāna (Saṁśuddha ed.). Amadāvada: Śeṭha Bholābhāī Jeśiṅgabhāī Adhyayana-Saṃśodhana Vidyābhavana. 2006.
