= Gujarati Sahitya Parishad =

Literary institution promoting Gujarati literature at Ahmedabad, India

- Seal of the Gujarati Sahitya Parishad
- Founder: Ranjitram Mehta
- Established: 1905; 120 years ago
- President: Harshad Trivedi
- Location: Ahmedabad, Gujarat, India
- Coordinates: 23.0339°N 72.5710°E
- Website: gujaratisahityaparishad.com

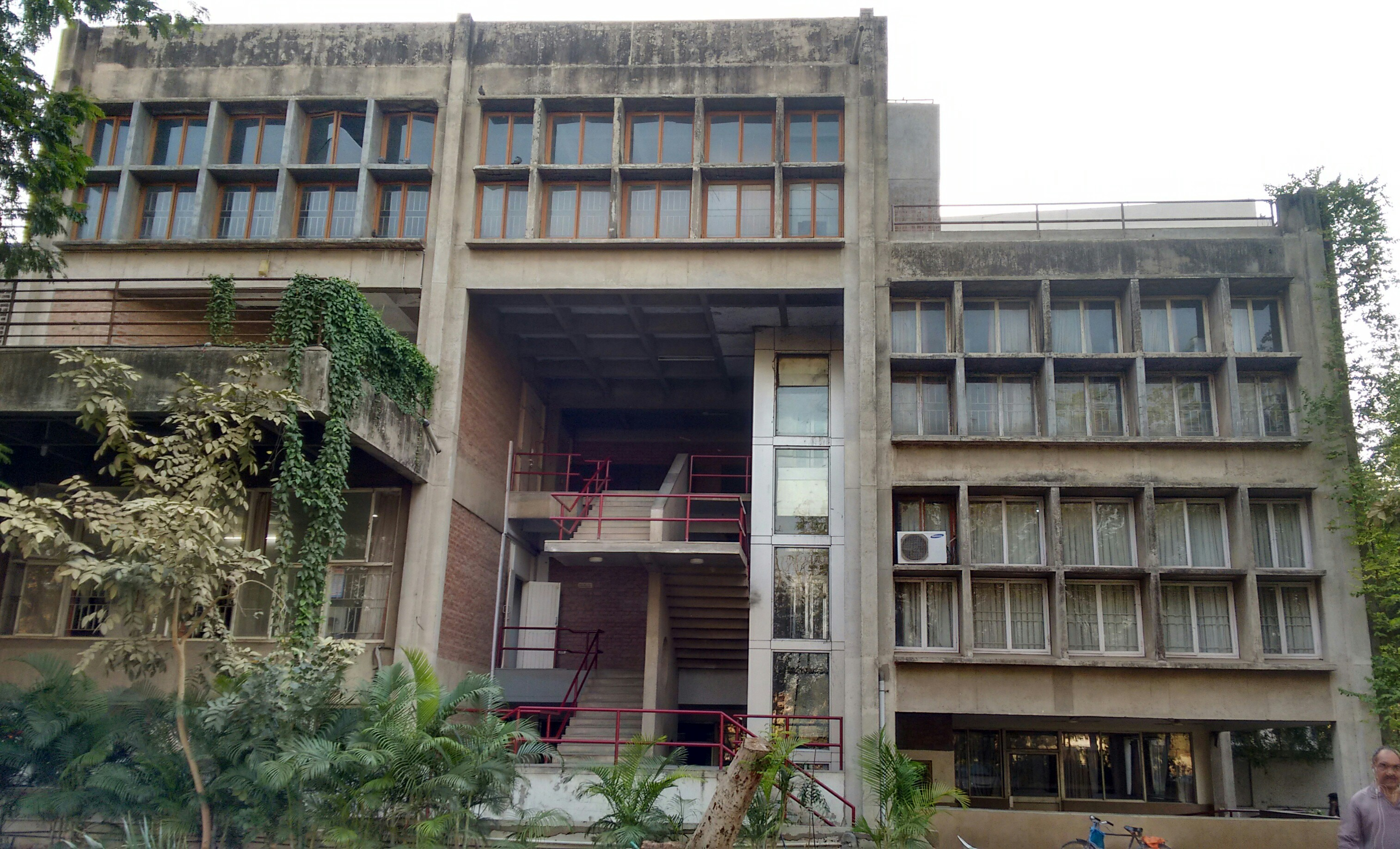
Gujarati Sahitya Parishad building

Gujarati Sahitya Parishad (lit. 'Gujarati Literary Council') is a literary organisation for the promotion of Gujarati literature located in Ahmedabad, Gujarat, India. It was founded by Ranjitram Mehta with the aim of creating literature appealing to all classes of society and cultivating a literary sense among the people. Many prominent people including Mahatma Gandhi and Kanaiyalal Munshi have presided over the organisation. Its headquarters, located on Ashram Road, is known as Govardhan Bhavan. It has a conference hall and library.

Parab is the monthly magazine of the Gujarati Sahitya Parishad and is published on the 10th of every month.

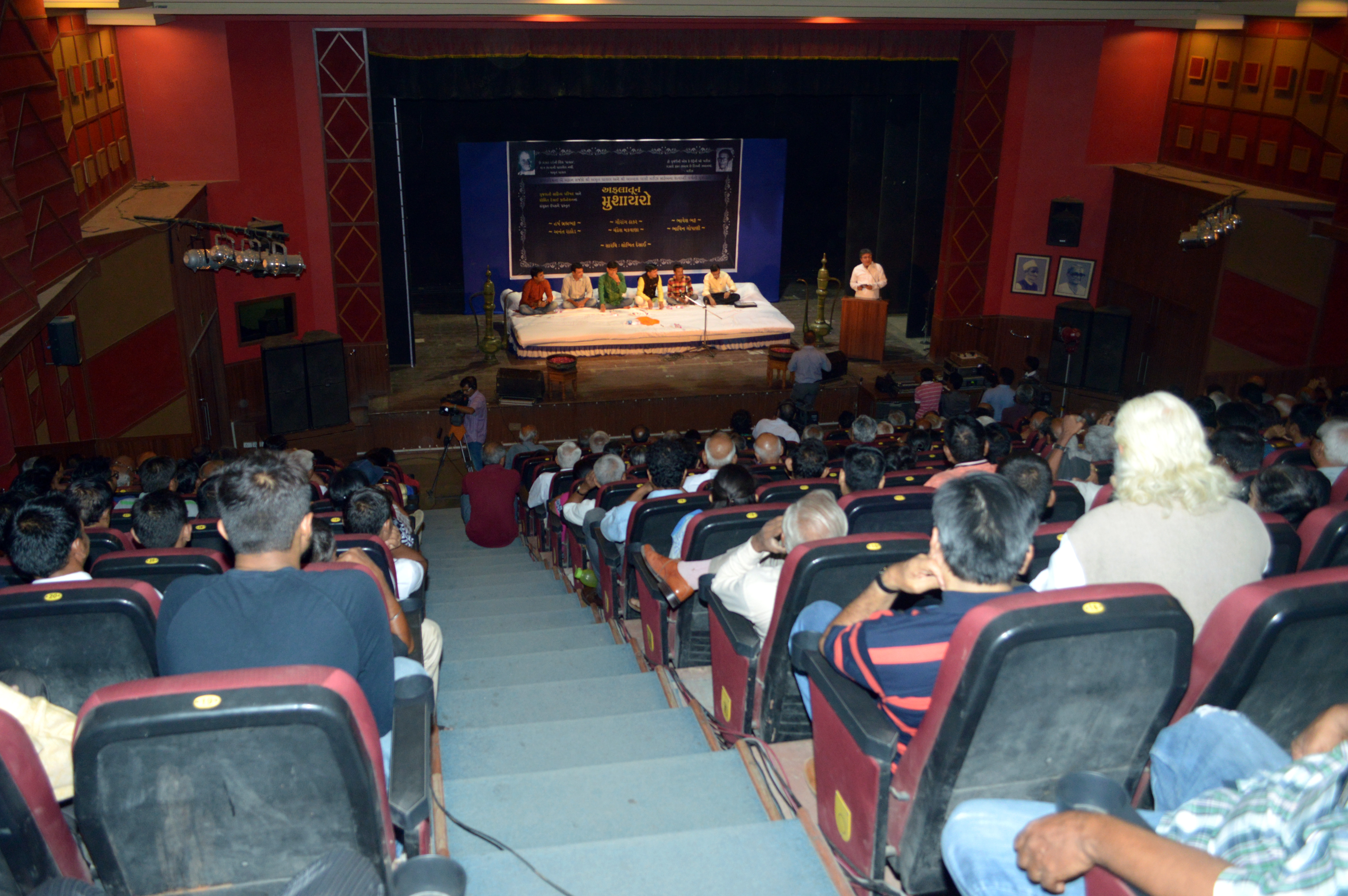
Ramnarayan V. Pathak Auditorium

== Presidents ==
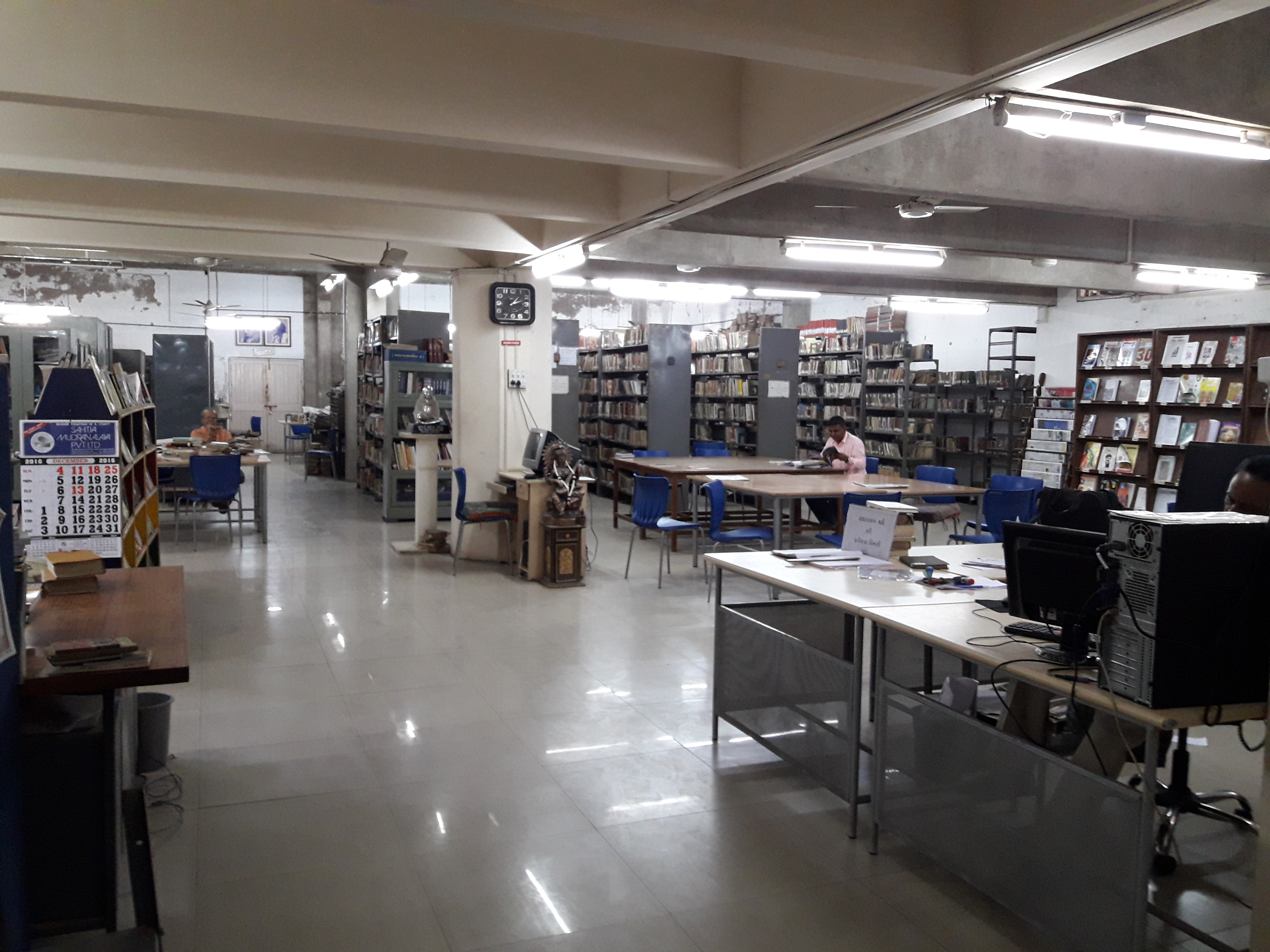
Chimanlal Mangaldas Library

President	City	Year
Harshad Trivedi	Bhopal	2023
Prakash N. Shah	Ahmedabad	2020
Sitanshu Yashaschandra	Secunderabad	2018
Chandrakant Topiwala	Bhuj	2016
Dhiru Parikh	Anand	2014
Varsha Adalja	Ahmedabad	2012
Bholabhai Patel	Junagadh	2011
Bhagwatikumar Sharma	Surat	2009
Narayan Desai	Ahmedabad	2007
Kumarpal Desai	Ahmedabad	2006
Bakul Tripathi	Mumbai	2005
Dhiruben Patel	Mahuva	2003
Raghuveer Chaudhari	Patan	2001
Dhirubhai Thaker	Visnagar	1999
Niranjan Bhagat	Baroda	1997
Vinod Bhatt	Jamnagar	1995
Rajendra Shah	Kolkata	1993
Ushnas	Coimbatore	1991
Jayant Pathak	Rajkot	1989
Bhogilal Sandesara	Bombay	1987
Keshavram Kashiram Shastri	Pune	1985
Yashwant Shukla	Surat	1983
Manubhai Pancholi	Hyderabad	1981
Anantrai Raval	Baroda	1979
Chandravadan Mehta		1978
Ramprasad Bakshi	Porbandar	1976
Gulabdas Broker	Vallabh	1974
Jhinabhai Desai 'Sneharasmi'	Chennai	1972
Tribhuvandas Luhar 'Sundaram'	Junagadh	1970
Umashankar Joshi	Delhi	1968
Jyotindra Dave	Surat	1966
Rasiklal Parikh	Mumbai	1964
Vishnuprasad Trivedi	Kolkata	1961
Kaka Kalelkar	Ahmedabad	1959
Kanaiyalal M. Munshi	Nadiad	1955
Harasidhdhabhai V. Divetiya	Navsari	1952
Kanaiyalal M. Munshi	Nadiad	1949
Ramnarayan V. Pathak	Rajkot	1946
Vidyagauri Nilkanth	Baroda	1943
Ardeshar Khabardar	Bombay	1941
Kanaiyalal M. Munshi	Karachi	1937
Mohandas Karamchand Gandhi	Ahmedabad	1936
Krishnalal Mohanlal Jhaveri	Lathi	1931
Bhulabhai Jivanaji Desai	Nadiad	1931
Anandshankar Dhruv	Nadiad	1928
Ramanbhai Nilkanth	Bombay	1926
Kamlashankar Trivedi	Bhavnagar	1924
Ranchhodlal Udayaram Dave	Baroda	1921
Hargovinddas Kantawala	Ahmedabad	1920
Narsinhrao Divetia	Surat	1915
Ambalal Sakarlal Desai	Rajkot	1909
Keshavlal Dhruv	Bombay	1907
Govardhanram Tripathi	Ahmedabad	1905

== Activities ==
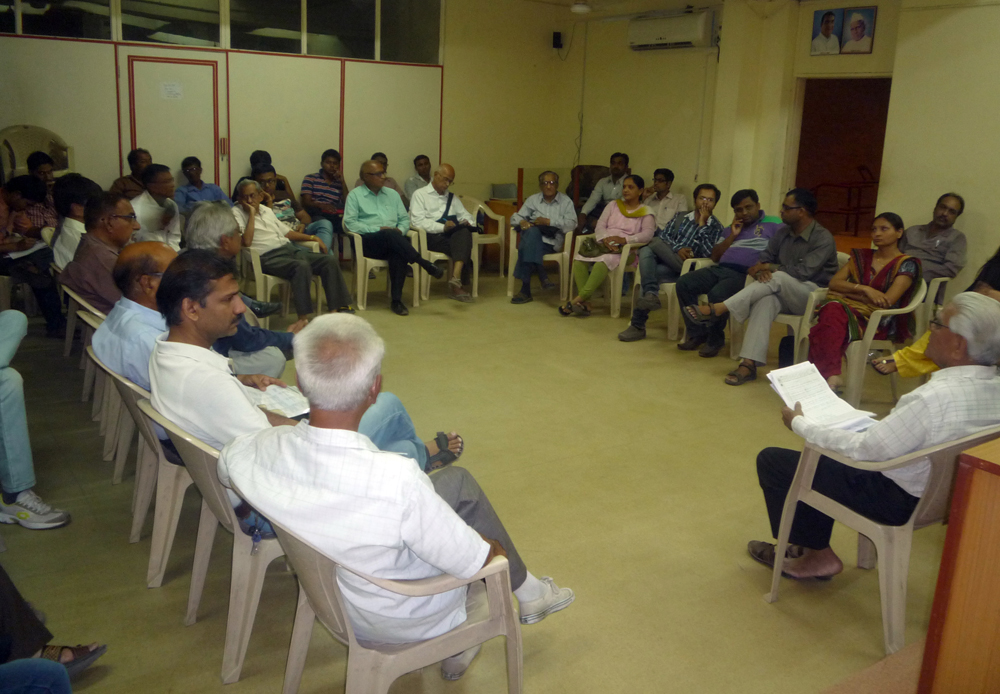
Budh Sabha

It published seven volumes of the History of Gujarati Literature, of which the first volume covers a period of 1150 A.D to 1450 A.D. A weekly poetry workshop known as Budh Sabha is held on every Wednesday at the World Poetry Center of Parishad.

It gives 30 prizes to writers in different genres of literature. The prizes given every two years are:

- Uma-Snehrashmi Prize for the best literary work
- Shri Arvind Prize for the best book on devotional literature
- Kakasaheb Kalelkar Prize for the best book of biography, essays, or travel
- Bhagini Nivedita Prize is given to the best female writer
- Batubhai Umarwadia Prize for the best one-act play
- Jyotindra H. Dave Prize for the best humorous work
- Parmanand Kunvarji Kapadia Prize for the best book on social education
- P. Trivedi Prize for the best book on education
- Ramprasad Bakshi Prize for the best book on poetic or on criticism
- B. M. Mankad Prize for the best amongst writers first publication of poetry, drama, short story or novel
- Harilal Maneklal Desai Prize for the best book on social philosophy or criticism
- Ushnas Prize for the best long poem
- Takhtasinh Parmar Prize for the best amongst writers first publication of poetry, drama, short story or novel
- Natvar Malvi Prize for children's literature
- Annieben Saraiya Prize for the best book on humanity
- Mahendra Bhagat Prize for the best anthology of poem
- Dilip Mehta Prize for the best anthology of ghazals
- Raman Pathak Sashtipurti Prize for the best collection of short stories
- Gopaldas Vidvans Prize for the best translation
- Bhaskarao Vidvans Prize for the best book of sociology
- Ramanlal Soni Prize for the best children's literature book
- Suresh Majumdar Prize for the best female translator
- Ramanlal Joshi Prize for the best book on criticism
- Upendra Pandya Prize for the best Ph.D. thesis
- Prabhashankar Teraiya Prize for the best book in linguistics or grammar
- Pandit Bechardas Jivaraj Dhoshi Prize for the best book on Sanskrit, Prakrit and Gujarati grammar
- Priyakant Parikh Prize for the best novel
- Ramu Pandit Prize for the best book on human relations or economics.

== Controversies ==
Gujarati Sahitya Parishad was fined by Ahmedabad Municipal Corporation in February 2022 for cutting trees illegally. Parishad did not pay attention for many months after getting notices from the corporation. Parishad also deleted this episode of illegally cutting trees from its annual report, which is again a breach by a public institution. Parishad received a lot of negative publicity in newspapers for this illegal and unethical conduct.
