= Gujarat Samachar =

Gujarati language daily newspaper

- Type: Daily newspaper
- Format: Broadsheet
- Owner: Lok Prakashan Limited
- Publisher: Shreyans Shah
- Editor: Shreyans Shah
- Founded: 1932
- Language: Gujarati
- Headquarters: Ahmedabad, Gujarat, India
- Country: India
- Circulation: 11.78 million (Indian Readership Survey 2017)
- OCLC number: 43611166
- Website: gujaratsamachar.com

The Gujarat Samachar is the leading Gujarati-language daily newspaper published in India. Its headquarters are in Ahmedabad with a branch in Surat. It is distributed from Ahmedabad, Surat, Vadodara, Rajkot, Bhavnagar, Bhuj, Mehsana, Mumbai and New York City.

== History ==
The newspaper was founded by Chhabilbhai M. Patel in 1932. It is later acquired by Shantilal Shah in 1952. Its first issue was published on 16 January 1932.

== Availability ==
Gujarati Samachar is primarily available in the state of Gujarat in India. The newspaper is available in several cities in the state including Keshod, Ahmedabad, Surat, Rajkot, Bhavnagar, and Baroda, Bhuj, Mehsana, Junagadh among others.

== Television channel ==
It also launched a Gujarati News Channel in December 2012, GSTV.

== Notable columnists ==
- Anil Chavda, poet, writer and columnist
- Bakul Tripathi, humour essayist, writer and columnist
- Hardwar Goswami, poet, writer and columnist
- Jay Vasavada, writer and columnist
- Joravarsinh Jadav, writer, folklorist and columnist
- Kumarpal Desai, author, critic, editor, journalist and columnist
- Makrand Mehta, writer, historian and columnist
- Pravin Darji, writer and columnist
- Rajesh Vyas, poet, writer and columnist
- Vinodini Nilkanth, writer, columnist and novelist
- Harshal Pushkarna, science writer
