= Shav Vahini Ganga =

Gujarati poem by Parul Khakhar

- by Parul Khakhar
- Original title: શબવાહિની ગંગા
- Written: May 2021
- Country: India
- Language: Gujarati
- Rhyme scheme: AABBAA
- Publication date: 11 May 2021
- Lines: 14

"Shav Vahini Ganga" or "Shab-Vahini Ganga" (English: "Ganges, the Hearse of Corpses") is a 2021 Gujarati-language poem that was written by Indian poet Parul Khakhar. The poem criticises the Indian government's handling of the COVID-19 pandemic. Her verses attracted widespread attention, particularly on social media, after she posted the poem on Facebook. The poem has been translated into several languages.

== Background ==
Parul Khakhar is a Gujarati-language poet from Amreli, Gujarat, India. She was fifty-one years old when she wrote "Shav Vahini Ganga" ("A Hearse called Ganges").

As the second wave of the COVID-19 pandemic swept over India, the country's newspapers began to cover the crisis by publishing disturbing images, including those of massed corpses of people suspected of dying from COVID-19, on their front pages. Cremation facilities were overwhelmed by the sharp rise in the demand for funerals. Patients died due to a lack of oxygen cylinders. Moved by these media reports, Parul Khakhar wrote a Gujarati-language poem called "Shav Vahini Ganga". On 11 May 2021, when she posted the poem on Facebook, it went viral and was soon translated into several languages. The translations also went viral on social media.

== Composition ==
"Shav Vahini Ganga" is a 14-line poem with an AABBAA rhyme scheme. The poem is written in the style of Marsiya, an elegiac poem or dirge.

The locus of her image, the Ganges river, is a core symbol of sacredness and is well known as such throughout India. The poem evokes the ire of the virus as it leaves a trail of death, as abandoned dead bodies float along the river, the smokes arise from funerary pyres, and the chimneys in crematoria undergo a meltdown from the number of bodies they had to incinerate. The piece, as a lament for the dead, lists a number of collateral effects of the pandemic, including the scarcity of pallbearers and mourners, and the drying up of the flow of tears.

The poem implicitly criticises the Narendra Modi government and attributes the government's inaction to the deaths that occurred during the second wave of COVID-19 pandemic. The poem describes Narendra Modi, the prime minister of India, as a "naked king" ruling a Ram Rajya where the sacred river Ganga serves as a hearse for corpses. In writing of the city that "burns as he fiddles", the Prime Minister, without being directly named, is likened to the Roman Emperor Nero. Modi is addressed in the lines:

O King, this entire city has at last seen your real face
O King, in your Ram-Rajya, do you see the bodies flowing along the Ganges?

The people of India are called upon to:

Come out and shout and say it loud
The naked King is lame and weak.

== Reception ==
The poem received both praises and criticism, and immediately became popular as comments on social media picked it up and multiplied it exponentially. It was translated into several languages including Assamese, Bengali, Hindi, English, Malayalam, Marathi, Punjabi and Tamil. Musical compositions for the Gujarati and Punjabi versions were released. Shalini Randeria and Ilija Trojanow published a German translation in Frankfurter Allgemeine Zeitung on 21 May 2021, along with their commentary on the poem. The Hindi translation was done by Ilyas Sheikh.

Khakhar was acclaimed for writing "such a powerful and brave poem" but was also "bombarded with abusive messages". Salil Tripathi writing for The Guardian noted users of social media posted over 28,000 abusive comments reacting to her allusion to the responsibility of the Indian government.

Prakash N. Shah and Salil Tripathi compared "Shav Vahini Ganga" with Hans Christian Andersen's tale The Emperor's New Clothes, emphasizing its power of telling a visible yet unperceived truth concerning the rulers of the state. According to Babu Suthar, "Shav Vahini Ganga" should be viewed as a protest poem in which the traditional, dominant Gujarati poetics of representation and transformation are put aside, and language is used as a weapon against the state.

The popular Gujarati writer Kaajal Oza Vaidya published an article about the poem in Divya Bhaskar on 16 May 2021. While calling the criticism of the government's handling of the pandemic "fashionable", she blamed the general populace for not following the COVID-19-related guidelines.

=== Gujarat Sahitya Akademi's criticism and responses ===
The following month, an editorial appeared in the June issue of Shabdasrishti, a publication of Gujarat Sahitya Akademi. Without explicitly mentioning "Shav Vahini Ganga", the editorial dismissed it as "pointless angst expressed in a state of agitation" and called those who discussed or shared the poem "literary Naxals". Vishnu Pandya, the editor of Shabdasrishti, wrote in The Indian Express: "There is no essence of poetry in the poem and neither it is the proper way to pen down poetry. This could be merely venting out one's anger or frustration, and it is being misused by liberals, anti-Modi, anti-BJP and anti-Rashtriya Swayamsevak Sangh elements."

After the publication of this editorial, which appeared to defend the Indian government, around 169 Gujarati writers issued a statement demanding its withdrawal. Some of the signatories included Amrit Gangar, Anil Joshi, Babu Suthar, Gulam Mohammed Sheikh, Himanshi Shelat, Jignesh Mevani, Kamal Vora, Mallika Sarabhai, Panna Naik, Praful Raval, Prakash N. Shah, Pravin Pandya, Priti Sengupta, Salil Tripathi, Sanjay Chhel, Sharifa Vijaliwala, Suman Shah, Yoseph Macwan, Zakia Soman. Shortly afterwards, Khakhar published a poem entitled "Taare Bolvanu Nahi" ("You Should Not Speak") in Nireekshak, a journal edited by Prakash N. Shah. In the issue, around half of the 16 contributions were written by the signatories of the statement and consisted of literary protests challenging the Shabdasrishti editorial.
