= Bhupathi =

Bhupathi, Bhupati, Bhoopathi or Boopathi is an Indian name and may refer to:

- Bhoopathi (1997 film), a Malayalam language film directed by Joshi, starring Suresh Gopi and Kanaka
- Bhoopathi (2007 film), a Kannada language film directed by S. Govinda, starring Darshan and Sherlin
- Mahesh Bhupathi (born 1974), Indian professional tennis player
- Nasikabatrachus bhupathi, a frog species found in the Western Ghats in India

== See also ==
- Bhupati Mohan Sen, 20th-century Indian physicist and mathematician
- Boopathy Pandian, Indian film director
- Bhoopatiraju Ravishankar Raju, better known as Ravi Teja, Indian actor
- Bhupathiraju Somaraju, Indian businessman
- Bhupathiraju Vijayakumar Raju, Indian industrialist and politician
- Bhupat Bhayani, Indian politician
- Bhupat Singh, Indian dacoit
- Bhupat Vadodaria, Indian writer
- Bhupatinagar, a village in Purba Medinipur district, West Bengal, India
- Poo Pathi, religious place in the Ayyavazhi sect of Hinduism
