= 2021 in poetry =

Major poetry related events taking place worldwide during 2021 are outlined below under different sections. This includes poetry books released during the year in different languages, major literary awards, poetry festivals and events, besides anniversaries and deaths of renowned poets etc. Nationality words link to articles with information on the nation's poetry or literature (for instance, India or France).

== Events ==
- January 5 – An anthology of poems by 157 blind poets from around the world titled Fountain of Light is released in a Braille version at Kolkata.

== Selection of works published in English ==
=== Australia ===
- Tony Birch, Whisper Songs
- Eileen Chong, A Thousand Crimson Blooms
- Erik Jensen, I Say the Sea Was Folded
- Bella Li, Theory of Colours
- Petra White, Cities

=== Canada ===
- Rupi Kaur, Home Body

=== India ===
- Ranjit Hoskote, Hunchprose, ISBN 978-06-700949-0-5
- Bibhu Padhi, A Friendship with Time, ISBN 978-93-87885806
- Antony Theodore, Psalms of Love, ISBN 978-81-952546-1-3

=== Iran ===
- Kaveh Akbar, Pilgrim Bell

=== United Kingdom ===
==== England ====
- Raymond Antrobus, The Perseverance
- Armando Iannucci, Pandemonium: Some Verses on the Current Predicament
- Hannah Lowe, The Kids
- Paul McCartney and Paul Muldoon, The Lyrics: 1956 to the Present
- Joelle Taylor, C+nto: & Othered Poems

=== Ukraine ===
- Borys Kutoviy, The Deth of the Poet
- Ihor Astapenko, Trees are better than us
- Ihor Mitrov, Voice of Ukraine
- Kateryna Kalytko, Order of Silent Women
- Oleg Kotsarev, The contents of a man's pocket
- Serhiy Zhadan, Psalm of aviation

=== United States ===
Alphabetical listing by author name

- Desiree C. Bailey, What Noise Against the Cane
- Rosebud Ben-Oni, If This Is The Age We End Discovery
- Daniel Borzutzky, Written After a Massacre in the Year 2018
- Catherine Cohen, God I Feel Modern Tonight
- Kate Durbin, Hoarders
- Tongo Eisen-Martin, Blood on the Fog
- Amanda Gorman, The Hill We Climb
- Douglas Kearney, Sho
- Donika Kelly, The Renunciations
- Amanda Lovelace, Shine Your Icy Crown
- Morgan Harper Nichols, All Along You Were Blooming
- Mary Oliver (died 2019), Devotions
- Sonia Sanchez, Collected Poems
- Tracy K. Smith, Such Color: New and Selected Poems
- Arthur Sze, Glass Constellations

==== Anthologies in the United States ====
- Joy Harjo, Living Nations, Living Words – contains works by Natalie Diaz, Craig Santos Perez, Sherwin Bitsui
- Jan Heller Levi & Christoph Keller (eds), The Essential June Jordan
- Kimiko Hahn & Harold Schechter (eds), Buzz Words: Poems About Insects

== Works published in other languages ==
=== Gujarati ===
Shav Vahini Ganga, poem by Parul Khakhar

== Awards and honors by country ==
- See also: List of poetry awards

Awards announced this year:

=== International ===
- Struga Poetry Evenings Golden Wreath Laureate: Carol Ann Duffy
- Struga Poetry Evenings Bridges of Struga: Vladan Krečković

=== Australia awards and honors ===
- Victorian Premier's Prize for Poetry formerly known as C. J. Dennis Prize for Poetry :
- Kenneth Slessor Prize for Poetry: Ellen van Neerven for Throat

=== Canada awards and honors ===
- Archibald Lampman Award: '
- J. M. Abraham Poetry Award:
- Governor General's Awards:
- Griffin Poetry Prize: Valzhyna Mort, ‘’Music for the Dead and Resurrected’’
- Latner Writers' Trust Poetry Prize:
- Gerald Lampert Award:
- Pat Lowther Award:
- Prix Alain-Grandbois:
- Raymond Souster Award:
- Dorothy Livesay Poetry Prize:
- Prix Émile-Nelligan:

=== France awards and honors ===
- Prix Goncourt de la Poésie:

=== India awards and honors ===
- Sahitya Akademi Award : Namita Gokhale for "Things to Leave Behind"
- Jnanpith Award :- Nilamani Phookan
- Moortidevi Award :-
- Saraswati Samman :- Ram Darash Mishra

=== New Zealand awards and honors ===
- Prime Minister's Awards for Literary Achievement:
  - Poetry:
- Mary and Peter Biggs Award for Poetry :

=== United Kingdom awards and honors ===
- Cholmondeley Award: Kei Miller
- Costa Book Award for poetry: Hannah Lowe, The Kids (also awarded overall Book of the Year)
- English Association's Fellows' Poetry Prizes:
- Eric Gregory Award (for a collection of poems by a poet under the age of 30):
- Forward Poetry Prize:
  - Short List: Tishani Doshi, A God at the Door; Kayo Chingonyi, A Blood Condition; Selima Hill, Men Who Feed Pigeons; Luke Kennard, Notes on the Sonnets; Stephen Sexton, Cheryl's Destinies
  - Best Collection:
  - Best Poem:
- Jerwood Aldeburgh First Collection Prize for poetry:
- Manchester Poetry Prize:
- National Poet of Wales:
- National Poetry Competition: Eric Yip for "Fricatives"
- Queen's Gold Medal for Poetry: Grace Nichols
- Seamus Heaney Poetry Prize: Sumita Chakraborty, Arrow
- T. S. Eliot Prize: Joelle Taylor, C+nto: & Othered Poems

=== United States awards and honors ===
- Arab American Book Award (The George Ellenbogen Poetry Award):
  - Honorable Mentions:
- Agnes Lynch Starrett Poetry Prize:
- Anisfield-Wolf Book Award:
- Beatrice Hawley Award from Alice James Books:
- Bollingen Prize:
- Dwarf Stars Award: Holly Lyn Walrath for "Yes, Antimatter Is Real"
- Elgin Awards
  - Mary Soon Lee for The Sign of the Dragon (book)
  - Akua Lezli Hope for Otherwheres (chapbook)
- Jackson Poetry Prize: Carl Phillips
- Lenore Marshall Poetry Prize:
- Los Angeles Times Book Prize:
- National Book Award for Poetry (NBA):
- National Book Critics Circle Award for Poetry:
- The New Criterion Poetry Prize:
- Pulitzer Prize for Poetry: Natalie Diaz, Postcolonial Love Poem
- Wallace Stevens Award:
- Whiting Awards:
- PEN Award for Poetry in Translation:
- PEN Center USA 2021 Poetry Award:
- PEN/Voelcker Award for Poetry: (Judges: )
- Raiziss/de Palchi Translation Award:
- Rhysling Awards:
  - Jenny Blackford for Eleven Exhibits in a Better Natural History Museum, London (Long)
  - Linda D. Addison for Summer Time(lessness) (short)
- Ruth Lilly Poetry Prize:
- Kingsley Tufts Poetry Award: John Murillo, Kontemporary Amerikan Poetry
- Kate Tufts Discovery Award: Jake Skeets, Eyes Bottle Dark with a Mouthful of Flowers
- Walt Whitman Prize – – Judge:
- Yale Younger Series: Robert Wood Lynn, Mothman Apologia (Judge: Rae Armantrout)

==== From the Poetry Society of America ====
- Frost Medal:
- Shelley Memorial Award:
- Writer Magazine/Emily Dickinson Award:
- Lyric Poetry Award:
- Alice Fay Di Castagnola Award:
- Louise Louis/Emily F. Bourne Student Poetry Award:
- George Bogin Memorial Award:
- Robert H. Winner Memorial Award:
- Cecil Hemley Memorial Award:
- Norma Farber First Book Award:
- Lucille Medwick Memorial Award:
- William Carlos Williams Award:

== Deaths ==
Birth years link to the corresponding "[year] in poetry" article:

- January 2 – Neelamperoor Madhusoodanan Nair (b. 1936), Indian Malayalam-language poet
- January 17 – Shankha Ghosh (b. 1932), Indian Bengali poet, COVID-19 complications
- January 23 – Martha Madrigal (b. 1929), Mexican poet and story writer
- February 3 – James Fenton (b. 1931), Northern Irish Ulster Scots dialect poet
- February 16 – Joan Margarit (b. 1938), Catalan Spanish poet and architect
- February 22 – Lawrence Ferlinghetti (b. 1919), American poet, painter and social activist
- March 6 – N. S. Lakshminarayan Bhat (b. 1936), Indian Kannada poet and Sahitya Akademi Award winner
- March 21 – Adam Zagajewski (b. 1919), Polish poet, novelist and translator (winner of Griffin Prize and the Neustadt Prize)
- April 11 – Justo Jorge Padrón (b. 1943) Canarian Spanish poet, translator and lawyer
- April 13 – Bernard Noel (b. 1930), French poet and writer
- April 17 – Al Young (b. 1939), American poet, novelist, essayist, screenwriter and educator
- April 21 – Shankha Ghosh (b. 1932), Indian Bengali poet, winner of Padma Bhushan, Jnanpith Award and Sahitya Akdemi Award
- April 22 – Anthony Thwaite (b. 1930), English poet and editor
- May 2 – Jesús Hilario Tundidor (b. 1935), Spanish poet
- May 12 – Seamus Deane (b. 1940), Irish poet, novelist and academic
- June 7 – Moon In-soo (b. 1945), South Korean poet
- June 10 – Buddhadeb Dasgupta (b. 1944), Indian Bengali poet, lyricist and filmmaker
- June 18 – Lamia Abbas (b. 1929), Iraqi poet and Arabic literary figure
- June 22 – Giulia Niccolai (b. 1934), Italian poet, novelist and translator
- June 24 – Stephen Dunn (b. 1939), American poet, educator and Pulitzer Prize winner, of Parkinson's disease complications
- June 26 – Josip Osti (b. 1945), Slovenian poet, critic and translator
- June 27 – Kolbein Falkeid (b. 1933), Norwegian poet
- July 2 – Omar Lara (b. 1941), Chilean poet and translator
- July 7 – Michael Horovitz (b. 1935), German-born British poet, editor, visual artist and translator
- July 13 – Brother Resistance (b. 1954), Trinidadian poet and musician
- July 27 – LeRoy Clarke (b. 1938), Trinidadian visual artist, poet, lecturer and philosopher
- August 4 – Jean "Binta" Breeze (b. 1956), Jamaican dub poet
- August 9 – Aung Cheint (b. 1948), Burmese poet
- September 16 – Tim Thorne (b. 1944), Australian poet
- October 17 – Brendan Kennelly (b. 1936), Irish poet
- November 6 – Raúl Rivero (b. 1945), Cuban poet
- November 21 – Robert Bly (b. 1926), American poet and essayist

== See also ==
- Poetry
- List of years in poetry
- List of poetry awards
