= Bhogilal =

Bhogilal is a masculine given name. Notable people with the name include:

- Bhogilal Gandhi (1911–2001), Indian writer
- Bhogilal Pandya, Indian freedom fighter
- Bhogilal Sandesara (1917–1995), Indian scholar
