= Gunvant Shah =

Indian writer and columnist

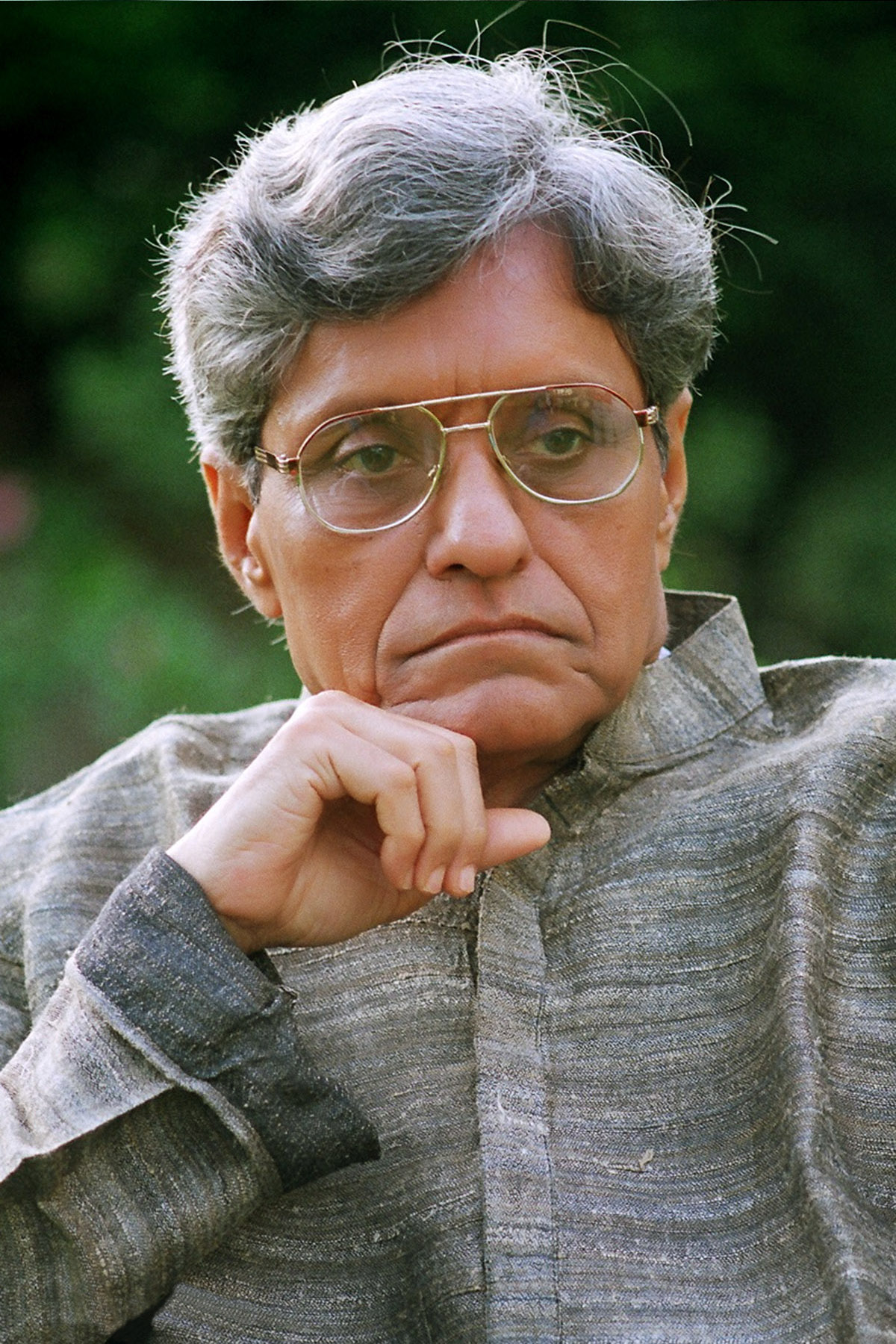
- Shah at his residence in Vadodara
- Born: 12 March 1937 (age 89); Rander, Surat, Gujarat, India
- Occupations: Writer; Essayist; Professor
- Spouse: Avantika Shah
- Children: Manisha, Amisha, Vivek
- Writing career
- Notable awards: Ranjitram Suvarna Chandrak (1997); Padma Shri (2015)

Gunvant Shah (born 1937) is an essayist, educationist, columnist and philosophy writer and critic from Gujarat, India. He taught at various universities and participated in various education oriented events and organisations. His large number of essays, including philosophical essays, are published as books. He received Ranjitram Suvarna Chandrak in 1997 and Padma Shri, the fourth highest civilian award of India, in 2015. In 2019, he was awarded a D.Lit. by Gujarat University.

== Life ==
Gunvant Shah was born on 12 March 1937 in Rander, Surat, Gujarat to Premiben and Bhukhanlal Shah. He completed his primary education from Rander and secondary education from Jain high school, Surat. He completed B.Sc. in chemistry in 1957. He received his B.Ed. from M. S. University, Vadodara in 1959. He continued at the university to finish his M.Ed. and Ph.D. in 1961 and 1964 respectively.

He served as Lecturer and Reader in the M.S. University from 1961 to 1972. He also served as a Visiting Professor to the University of Michigan, Ann Arbor, US in 1967–68 and the visiting professor in Arizona State University, Tempe, US in 1985. He also served as Professor and Head, Department of Education, Technical Teachers' Training Institute, Madras in 1972–73; Professor of Education, SNDT Women's University, Mumbai in 1973–74; Professor and Head, Department of Education, South Gujarat University, Surat. He edited Nutan Shikshan magazine. He had founded Panchasheel, a youth movement in Gujarat. He was the Chancellor of Gujarat state unit of International Association of Educators for World Peace. He was the President of Indian Association for Education Technology.

He was the vice-president of the Study Group on Economics of Media Technology sponsored by UNESCO to visit Paris in 1974. He represented India at the UNESCO Seminar in Leipzig, East Germany in 1979. He was a consultant to Asian Development Bank, Manila for education in Bangladesh during 1984–85. In 1975, he attended International Seminar on Microteachin at University of Lancaster, UK. He was a member of the Delegation to East Germany sent by the University Grants Commission in 1979. He served as a Resource Person in the Twelfth World Conference of International Council of Correspondence Education Vancouver, Canada in 1982.

Since retirement from his teaching career, he writes weekly columns in Divya Bhaskar daily, Chitralekha weekly and Navneet Samarpan monthly. In 2019, he was bestowed an Honorary D.Lit. from Gujarat University. He lives at his residence 'Tahuko' in Vadodara.

== Works ==
Gunvant Shah is chiefly an essayist. His collections of essays are Cardiogram (1997), Ran To Lilachham (1978), Vagda Ne Taras Tahukani (1979), Vicharo Na Vrundavanma (1981), Manna Meghdhanush (1985), Dhai Akshar Prem Ka (1993), Gandhini Ghadiyal, Silence Zone (1984), Gandhini Champal, Batrise Kothe Diva (1988), Sambhavami Yuge Yuge (1994), Akantna Akashma (1996), Kabir Khada Bazar Me (2004), Parodhiye Kalrav, Vrukshmandirni Chhayama (2008), Kokarvarno Tadako, Nirkhine Gaganma, Cactus Flower, Viratne Hindole, Maro Tya Sudhi Jivo, Zakal Bhina Parijat, Ekant Na Akash Ma, Prabhuna Ladakvaya, Nikhalas Vato, Mahabharat: Manavatanu Mahakavya, Ekaltana Everest Par, Gandhini Lakdi, Patangiyani Anandyatra, Prem Etle... and Kan Daine Sanbhalajo.

He wrote several books on philosophy including Krishnanu Jivansangeet (Symphony of Krishna, 1984), Astitvano Utsav (1990), Patangiya Ni Avkashyatra (1998), Ghare Ghare Geetamrut (1989), Mahant, Mullah, Padri (1999), Ishavasyam, Ramayan: Manvatanu Mahakavya (2003), Bhagavananee Tapal (2006), Tahuko, Guftagu, Puchhta Nar Pandit, Sex Mari Drashtie, Ishwar Allah Tero Naam, Sabko Sanmati De Bhagwan, Sathe Shabde Shabde Setubandh, Patangiya Ni Amrutyatra, Sambhavami Kshane Kshane, E-mail, Secular Murabbo, Secular Mijaj, Secular Agenda, Secular Idiot, Krishna Mari Drashtie, Krishnam Sharnam Gachhami, Krishnaleela Madhur Madhur.

His biographical books are Ma, Gandhi: Navi Pedhini Najare, Mahamanav Mahavir (1986), Karunamurti Buddha (1983), Sardar Etle Sardar (1994), Shakyata Na Shilpi Shri Arvind and Gandhina Chashma.

Columbusna Hindustanma (1966) and Apane Pravasi Paravarna are his travelogues. Vismayanu Parodh (1980) is a collection of prose poetry. Motel (1986), Rajkan Suraj Thavane Shamane (1986) and Pavan Nu Ghar (1995) are his novels.

Billo Tillo Tach (1997) and Jat Bhanee Ni Jatra are his autobiographical works.

The Boss is his book on management. His other books are Shikshanni Vartaman Philsufio (1964) and Savdhan, Ekvisami Sadi Avi Rahi Chhe (1987). The quotes collected from his books are published as Telegram, Telex and Fax. His books are translated in other languages also. He has published five books in English and six in Hindi.

== Awards and recognition ==
He has won several prizes of Gujarati Sahitya Parishad and Gujarati Sahitya Akademi. He was awarded Pravinkant Reshamwala Smriti Award in 1992. He is the recipient of Ranjitram Suvarna Chandrak in 1997, the highest literary award in Gujarati literature. He was awarded Swami Sachchidanand Sanman in 2001. He was awarded Padma Shri, the fourth highest civilian award of India, in 2015. In 2016, Gujarat Sahitya Akademi awarded him the Sahityaratna Award. In 2019, he was awarded a D.Lit. by Gujarat University.
