= Shabdasrishti =

Gujarati literary magazine

Shabdsrishti
- cover page, February 2017, special issue
- Editor: Vishnu Pandya
- Former editors: Suman Shah; Jyotish Jani; Pravin Darji; Harshad Trivedi; Rajendra Patel; Vishnu Pandya
- Categories: Literature
- Frequency: Monthly
- Format: Print
- Publisher: Gujarat Sahitya Akademi
- Founder: Gujarat Sahitya Akademi
- Founded: 1983; 43 years ago
- Country: India
- Based in: Gandhinagar
- Language: Gujarati
- Website: official website
- ISSN: 2319-3220
- OCLC: 30957926

Shabdasrishti (Gujarati: શબ્દસૃષ્ટિ, romanized: Śabdasr̥ṣṭi, lit. 'World of Words'), the journal of the Gujarat Sahitya Akademi, is a Gujarati literary magazine, published on the fifth of every month. The magazine was started in 1983, a year after the establishment of the Akademi. Shabdakhya Jyoti Prakasho (Devnagari: शब्दाख्यज्योति प्रकाशो) is a motto of this magazine.

== History ==
The first issue of Shabdasrishti was published in October 1983 under the editorship of Suman Shah. Shah served as an editor until May 1986, followed by Jyotish Jani from October 1986 to February 1990. The third editor of the magazine was Pravin Darji, who served from January 1992 until December 1994. It was then edited by Harshad Trivedi from January 1995 until October 2013. After Harshad Trivedi, no particular individuals have taken this position. Instead, the magazine has been edited by associate writers Bhagyesh Jha, Rajendra Patel and Dakshesh Thakar. In May 2017, Vishnu Pandya became president of the Akademi, and Shabdasrishti has begun to be published under his editorship.

== See also ==
- List of Gujarati-language magazines
