= Bhagwatikumar Sharma =

Indian author and journalist (1934–2018)

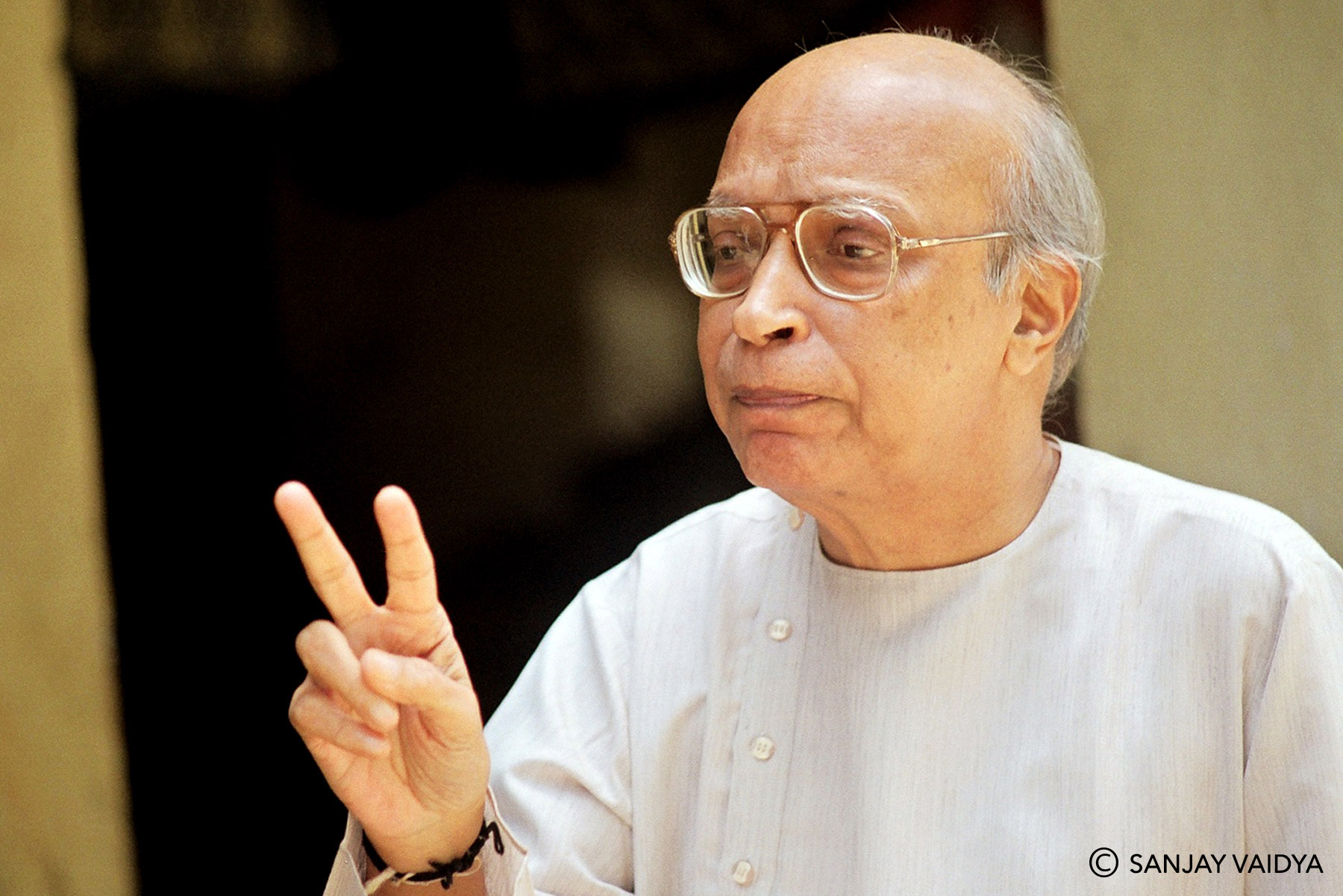
- Sharma at Mumbai, 1999
- Born: Bhagwatikumar Hargovind Sharma; 31 May 1934; Surat, Bombay Presidency, British India
- Died: 5 September 2018 (aged 84); Surat, Gujarat, India
- Education: B. A.
- Occupations: author, journalist
- Spouse: Jyotibahen (m. 1953; died 2009)
- Writing career
- Language: Gujarati
- Period: Modern Gujarati literature
- Notable works: Urdhvamool (1981); Asuryalok (1987)
- Notable awards: Kumar Chandrak (1977); Ranjitram Suvarna Chandrak (1984); Sahitya Akademi Award (1988); Vali Gujarati Gazal Award (2011); Sahityaratna Award (2017)

Bhagwatikumar Sharma (31 May 1934 – 5 September 2018) was an Indian author and journalist who wrote in Gujarati. Born in Surat and educated in languages, he edited a daily for several years. He wrote novels, short stories, poetry, essays and criticism. He received Ranjitram Suvarna Chandrak in 1984 and Sahitya Akademi Award in 1988.

== Biography ==
Sharma was born in Surat on 31 May 1934 in Shrimali Brahmin family of Hargovind and Heeraben. His family was a native of Ahmedabad. His father was a pandit of Samveda. He completed the secondary school education in 1950 and left studies. He later completed his B. A. in Gujarati and English languages in 1968.

He wrote his first poem, on the event of Mahatma Gandhi's death, on 31 January 1948. In 1951, his two sonnets were published for the first time in Gujaratmitra, a daily published from Surat. In 1953, he recited his poem for the first time in the poet meet. He joined the editing department of Gujarat Mitra in 1955. He served as the trustee of Kavi Narmad Yugavart Trust and vice-president of Narmad Sahityasabha, Surat. He also served as president of the Gujarati Sahitya Parishad from 2009 to 2011.

He married Jyotiben in 1953. She died in 2009.

Sharma died on 5 September 2018 in Surat.

== Works ==
His novels include Aarti ane Angara (1957), Man Nahi Mane (1962), Rikta (1968), Vyaktamadhya (1970), Samaydvip (1974), Urdhvamool (1981), Asuryalok (1987), Dwar Nahi Khule, Premyatra, Viti Jashe Aa Rat?, Padchhaya Sang Preet (1963), Na Kinaro, Na Mazdhar (1965), Hridaysharan, Nirvikalp (2006). Samaydvip deals with old Brahmin culture and modern sensibility. His short story collections include Deep Se Deep Jale (1959), Hridaydaan (1960), Ratrani, Chhinnabhinna (1967), Mahek Mali Gai, Tamane Ful Didhanu Yaad Nathi (1970), Kai Yaad Nathi (1974), Vyarth Kakko, Chhal Barakhadi (1979), Akathya (1994), Mangalya Kathao (2001) and Adabeed (1985). His selected stories are published as Bhagavatikumarni Shresth Vartao (1987). His collections of essays are Shabdateet (1980), Bistantu (1988), Hriday Sarasa (1995), Dandiya Dool (2005), Jadabatod (2006), Spandan. Supda Saf is collection of humorous essays while America Avje (1996) is his travelogue.

He worked in different genres of poetry such as Ghazal, Geet, Sonnet etc. Sambhav (Ghazal collection), his first anthology, was published in 1974, followed by Chhando Chhe Pandada Jenan (1987), Nakhdarpan (1995), Jhalhal (1995), Adhi Aksharnu Chomasu (2002), Ujaagaro (2004), Ek Kagal Harivarne (2003), Gazalayan (2009) and Atmasaat (2010). Atmasaat is a collection of 72 sonnets dedicated to his wife, Jyoti, after her death. He has written biography, Saral Shatriji. He translated Sat Yugoslav Varta (1978), Ashadno Ek Divas (1979) and Alok Parva (1995). He edited Swasoshwas on the occasion of seventieth anniversary of Gani Dahiwala. His poems are also compiled as Tamara Vina Saanj Duske Chadhi Chhe (2003) by Suresh Dalal, Shabdanu Saat Bhavnu Lenu Chhe (2009) and Gazalni Paalakhi (2009) by Ravindra Parekh and Kavyakalash by Bharati Dalal.

He has written his autobiography Surat Muj Ghayal Bhoomi.

== Recognition ==
He received Kumar Chandrak in 1977 and Ranjitram Suvarna Chandrak in 1984. He also received Sahitya Akademi Award in 1988 for his novel Asuryalok. He was conferred the Doctor of Literature (D.Litt.) by Veer Narmad South Gujarat University in 1999. He received Kalapi Award in 2003. In 2011, he received the Harindra Dave Memorial Award for journalism and Vali Gujarati Gazal Award for his contribution to literature. He also received Nachiketa award in 1999, Nandshankar Mehta Chandrak in 1998 for Akathya, Swami Sachchidanand Sanman in 2003, Darshak Award. He received Narsinh Mehta Award in 2009. In 2017, Gujarat Sahitya Akademi awarded him Sahityaratna Award.

== See also ==
- List of Gujarati-language writers
