= Sahityaratna Award =

Sahityaratna Award સાહિત્યરત્ન એવોર્ડ (Gujarati)
- Civilian award for contributions to Literature
- Awarded for: Literary honour in Gujarat, India
- Sponsored by: Gujarat Sahitya Akademi
- Reward: ₹ 1,51,000 (1.5 lakh)
- First award: 2016
- Final award: 2017

Highlights
- First award winner: Gunvant Shah
- Last award winner: Bhagwatikumar Sharma
- Total awarded: 2

The Sahityaratna (Gujarati: સાહિત્યરત્ન એવોર્ડ), is a literary honour in Gujarat, India, conferred by Gujarat Sahitya Akademi and Government of Gujarat to the Gujarati authors for their significant contribution in Gujarati literature. Established in 2016, the award comprises a plaque, shawl and a cash prize of Rs. 1,51,000 (1.5 lakh).

== Recipients ==
Following is the list of recipients.

Year	Recipients
2016	Gunvant Shah
2017	Bhagwatikumar Sharma
