= Abdulgani Dahiwala =

Gujarati poet (1908–1987)

Gani Dahiwala
- Born: Abdulgani Abdulkarim Dahiwala; 17 August 1908; Surat, Bombay Presidency, British India
- Died: 5 March 1987 (aged 78)
- Education: Std. 3
- Occupations: poet, playwright
- Writing career
- Pen name: Gani Dahiwala
- Language: Gujarati
- Years active: 1942–1987
- Genres: Ghazal, Geet, Muktak
- Notable works: Gatan Jharana (1953); Ganimat (1971)

Abdulgani Abdulkarim Dahiwala (August 17, 1908 – March 5, 1987), popularly known as Gani Dahiwala was an Indian Gujarati poet.

== Life ==
Abdulgani Dahiwala was born on 17 August 1908 at Surat. He came to Ahmedabad in 1928 but later returned to Surat in 1930 when he started a tailor shop. He established the music group Swarsangam in Surat. Later he was a founding member of Mahagujarat Gazal Mandal in 1942. He wrote satirical poetry in the Gujarat Mitra daily published from Surat. He traveled to Pakistan in 1981 under Cultural Exchange Scheme set by Government of India. He died on 5 March 1987.

== Works ==
Gata Zarana (1953), Mahek (1961), Madhurap (1971), Ganimat (1971) and Nirant (1981) are collections of different genres of poetry such as songs, ghazal, Muktaka (single stanza poetry). Jashne Shahadat (1957) is Hindi musical play based on Indian Rebellion of 1857. Pehle Maale is his three act play staged in 1959-60 but never published. All of his poems have published as Hoy Na Hoy Vyakti Ne Enu Naam Bolaya Kare, compiled by Bhagvatikumar Sharma and Ravindra Parekh, in 2009.

== See also ==
- List of Gujarati-language writers
