= Asuryalok =

1987 Gujarati novel by Bhagwatikumar Sharma

- Author: Bhagwatikumar Sharma
- Original title: અસૂર્યલોક
- Language: Gujarati
- Genre: Family saga novel
- Publisher: R. R. Sheth & Co., Bombay
- Publication date: 1987
- Publication place: India
- Awards: Sahitya Akademi Award (1988)
- Dewey Decimal: 891.473

Asuryalok (Gujarati pronunciation: [əsuryəlok]; English: The World Sans the Sun) is a 1987 Gujarati family saga novel by Indian writer Bhagwatikumar Sharma. It won the Sahitya Akademi Award in 1988. The plot revolves around a father, his son and his grandson, who deal with the family's hereditary affliction of blindness.

== Publication history ==
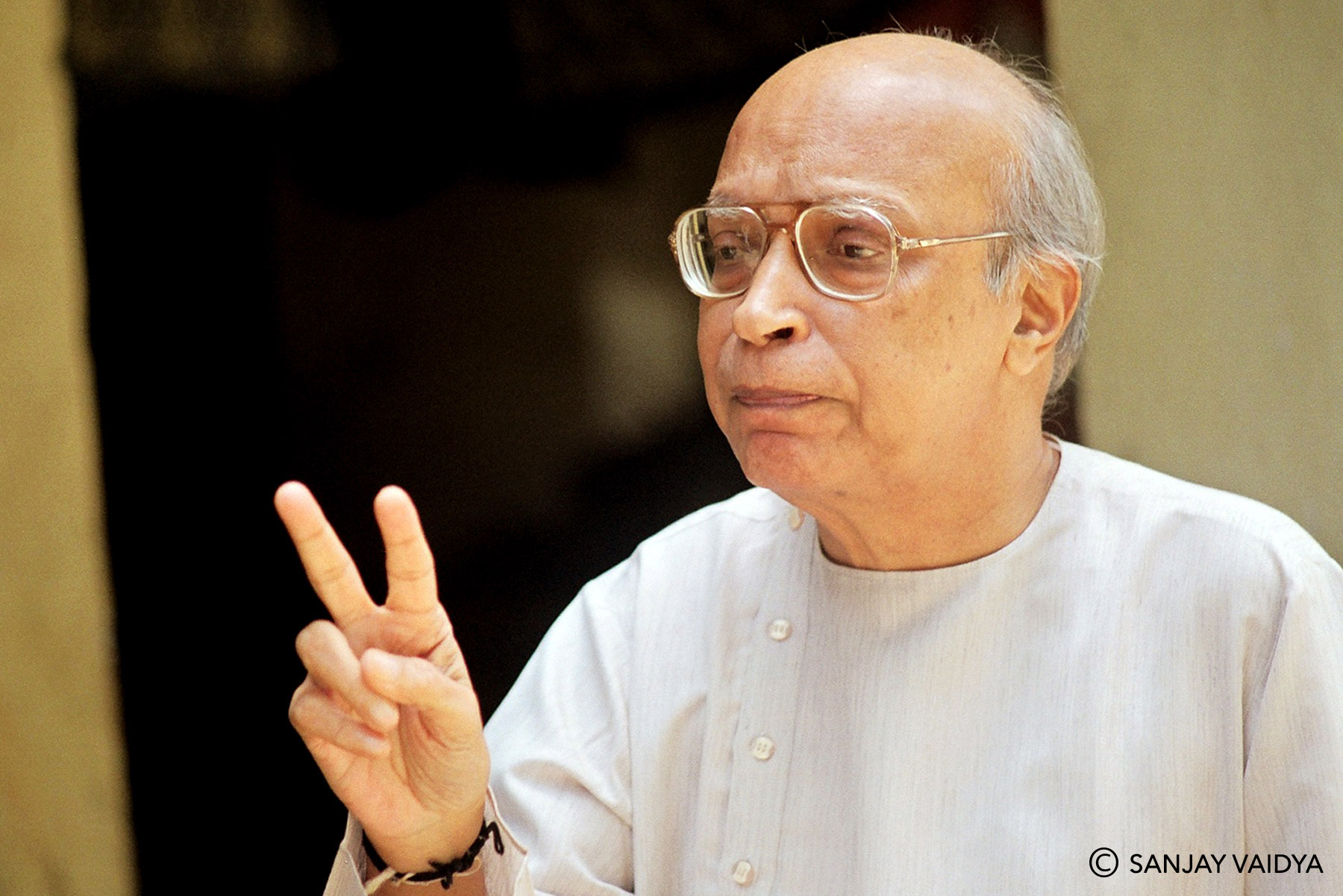
Bhagwatikumar Sharma wrote it for Gujarati daily Janmabhoomi Pravasi.

Asuryalok was first serialized in Janmabhoomi Pravasi, a Gujarati daily newspaper published from Bombay, in 1985. It was first published as a book in 1987 by R. R. Sheth & Co., Bombay.

== Characters ==
The novel's main characters are:

- Bhadrashanker – a priest
- Nigamshanker – Bhadrashanker's son
- Bhagirathi – Nigamshanker's wife
- Tilak – the son of Nigamshanker and Bhagirathi
- Abhijit – Tilak's neighbor, a sitarist
- Satya – Abhijit's sister
- Ajay – Satya's husband

== Plot ==
Bhadrashanker, a priest, is a slave to all kinds of vices. His son Nigamshanker, who is studying in a Sanskrit pathshala, suddenly has an attack of smallpox and loses his eyesight. He reconciles himself to his fate, goes to the pathshala and attempts to learn by hearing. A great Sanskrit scholar from Varanasi visits the pathshala; seeing Nigamshanker's desire for knowledge, he takes him to Varanasi. Nigamshanker studies there for 12 years, gaining proficiency in all branches of knowledge. When he returns, his father is on his deathbed. His father had married a girl of his son's age after his mother's death. Nigamshanker does not mourn his father's death. However, he treats his stepmother so well that she persuades her niece Bhagirathi to marry him. Their married life is very happy. Bhagirathi gives birth to a son, Tilak, who is a bright boy. When he is 10 years old, he finds that he cannot read what has been written on the blackboard. When a doctor is consulted, he advises him to give up his studies, but Tilak, encouraged by his father, ignores the advice and pursues his studies. Furthermore, he even learns to play the sitar from Abhijit, his neighbor's son. Abhijit's sister Satya is a naughty girl who continuously teases Tilak about his weak eyesight. Once, when Tilak is attending a sitar concert, Satya abducts him.

During a heavy downpour that lasts for several days, the river flowing through the city is flooding. Nigam, Bhagirathi and Tilak have to stand on the staircase for three days. In the flood, Nigam's books and rare manuscripts are destroyed. Nigam is reconciled to the disaster, but Tilak vows to rebuild the library. Satya is very worried about Tilak and tries to control him when he is impulsive. Tilak passes the B.A. examination with a first-class degree and, at the insistence of Gordhandas (the chairman of the governing body), is offered a job as librarian which he readily accepts. Gordhandas's daughter Iksha, who has sisterly feelings for Tilak, wants Tilak to complete his studies.

Tilak's father Nigam is the chief priest at the sacrificial ceremony in the adjoining city, where he dies due to a snakebite. One day, Satya comes to the library and asks to marry Tilak. Tilak declines, stating that their children are likely to be blind, given that his grandfather had become blind some years prior to his death, his father's eyesight had deteriorated by the age of 16 and his eyesight is constantly getting worse. Satya promises to follow in the footsteps of Tilak's mother. Even then Tilak does not agree, but she says, "I won't accept defeat, I will have my way". She is forced to agree to her betrothal to Ajay. However, on the night before her wedding, she goes to Tilak wearing her wedding dress and asks to be implanted with the symbol of Tilak's cultural heritage. They have sex that night, which results in her conception.

Satya's husband Ajay is a man of vices and perversions. Satya writes letters to Tilak, informing him about Ajay's behaviour and his insistence on her co-operating with him in his unlawful and criminal activities. In her last letter she tells him that her son has been born, and that she is happy because the son looks just like Tilak. Tilak does not reply, worrying that his letters might be intercepted and Ajay might kill her.

Tilak takes his mother on a pilgrimage, leading to a clash between his mother's traditional attitude and Tilak's modernist, rationalist attitude. His mother chides him for not accepting Satya's offer of marriage, and depriving her of a grandson. Tilak, who keeps in mind the events of the night before Satya's marriage and Satya's letter informing him about the birth of a son, uses harsh words in order to hide the fact. Terribly hurt, Bhagirathi goes to the river to drown herself and Tilak has to reveal the secret in order to save his mother's life. After some days, Bhagirathi has a heart attack and dies with Satya's name on her lips.

Tilak passes his M.A. examination in the first class and enrolls for a Ph.D. to research tribes. For this purpose he travels widely in tribal areas and reads a lot, causing his eyes to become damaged by the strain. He goes to Bombay to consult an eye specialist, who operates upon his eyes, but his eyesight is not restored. While leaving the clinic, Tilak accidentally sees Satya who has come for her son's eye check-up. Satya, who has now been divorced, takes Tilak to her house. They decide to stay together like a married couple, and go to Tilak's city. There, the people accept them as married, and the child as their son. Not only that, Satya is allowed to perform the traditional temple ritual which is performed by the most pious person.

== Theme ==
The theme of Asuryalok is a struggle for enlightenment against physical as well as social hurdles.

== Reception ==
The novel received the Sahitya Akademi Award in 1988. The award citation states that "meaningful dialogues, lively characterisation and poetic description are the outstanding features of the novel. It is one of the most interesting and significant novels in the traditions of the novel of ideas."

The critic Chandrakant Mehta wrote: "the novel is a family saga in which social metamorphoses in a period of 60 years are vividly delineated. The narration, characterisation, style and expression all place the novel on a high pedestal. Though there is a tragic strain throughout the story, the main characters successfully fight their destiny, and that is the distinctive quality of the novel".
