= Chandrakant Topiwala =

Indian Gujarati-language poet and critic (born 1936)

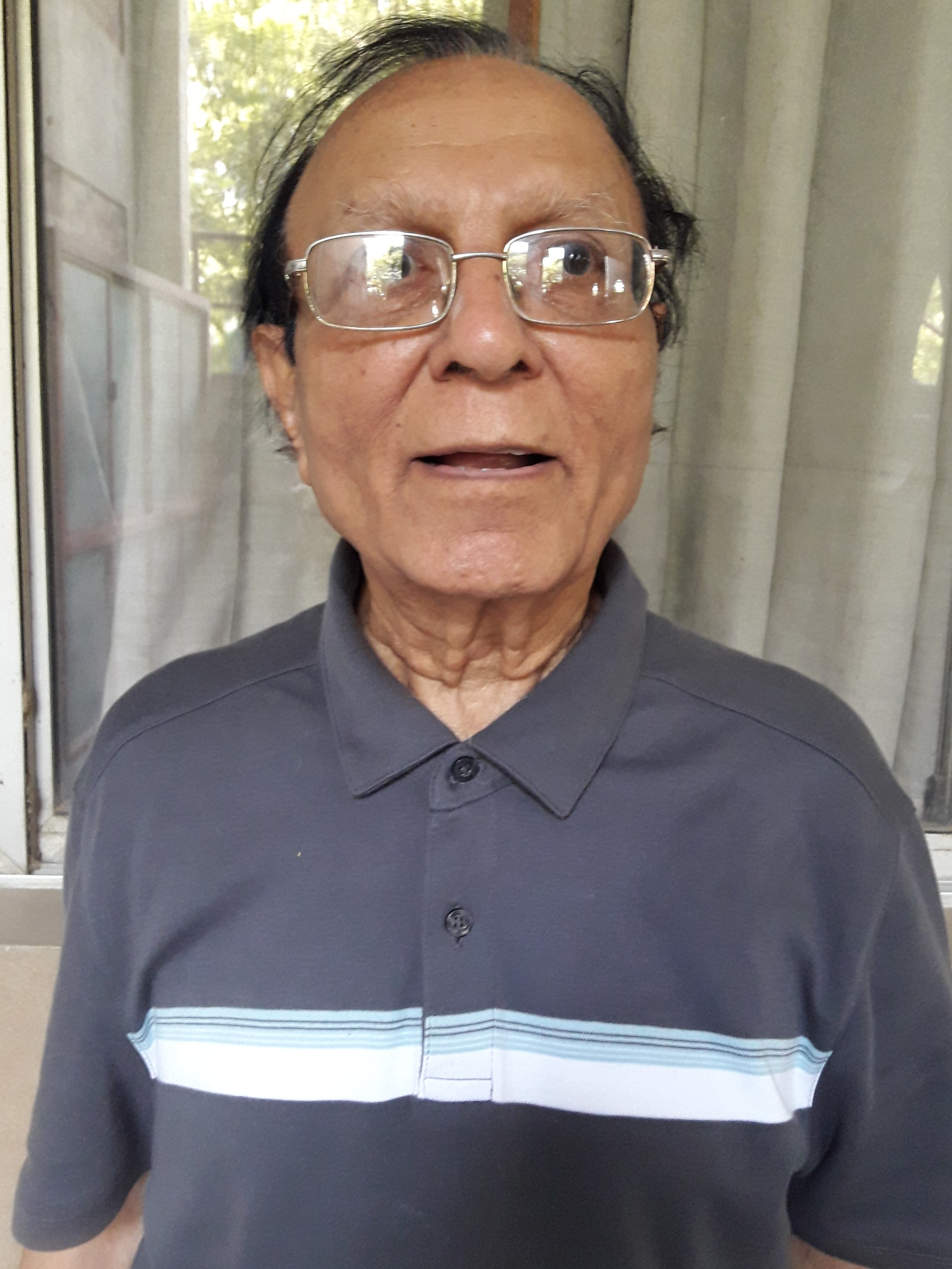
- at Gujarati Sahitya Parishad, Ahmedabad, October 2017
- Born: 7 August 1936 (age 90); Vadodara, Gujarat, India
- Occupations: poet, critic
- Writing career
- Language: Gujarati
- Notable awards: Ranjitram Suvarna Chandrak (2002); Sahitya Akademi Award (2012); Samanvay Bhasha Samman award (2013)

Academic background
- Thesis: Linguistic operations in modern Gujarati poetry criticism
- Doctoral advisor: Self

Academic work
- Doctoral students: Rajesh Vyas; Mohan Parmar

Chandrakant Amritlal Topiwala (born 7 August 1936) is a Gujarati language poet and critic from Gujarat, India.

== Early life ==
Topiwala was born on 7 August 1936 at Vadodara, to Amritlal and Lilavati. He completed his Bachelor of Arts in Gujarati from the University of Bombay-affiliated Saint Xavier's College in 1958, and received his Masters in 1960. He completed his PhD in 1982 from Gujarat University.

== Career ==
Topiwala taught Gujarati language at K H Madhvani College, Porbandar from 1961 to 1965. In 1965, he joined Navjivan Commerce and Arts College, Dahod as head of Department of Gujarati, and served as principal of the college from 1971 to 1984. Later he became the director of Kasturbhai Lalbhai Swadhyay Mandir, run by Gujarati Sahitya Parishad, Ahmedabad. He was the president of Parishad during 2016 to 2018.

== Works ==
=== Poetry ===
Maheraman, his first poetry collection, was published in 1962, followed by Kant Tari Rani in 1971, which gained him critical acclaim. Pakshitirth (1988) is further experimental poetry. Black Forest (1989) was written during his visit to Europe and was influenced by European culture. Avagaman (1999) and Apani Kavyasamriddhi (2004) are his other works of poetry.

=== Criticism ===
Topiwala is considered a modernist critic. His first book, Aparichit A Aparichit B, was published in 1975 which has four sections. His collection Had Parna Hans Ane Albatross (1975) is a translation and criticism of French symbolist poetry. Madhyamala (1983) is a collection of articles on medieval Gujarati literature. Other publications include Pratibhasha nu Kavach (1984), San-sarjanatamak Kavya-vigyan (1985), Vivechanno Vibhajit Pat (1990), Granth Ghatna (1994) and Gujarati Sakshibhasya.

=== Translations ===
He has translated works of the Bohemian-Austrian poet Rainer Maria Rilke into Gujarati: Duino Elegies as Duino Karunikao (1976) and Sonnets to Orpheus as Orpheus Prati Sonneto (1977). He translated Samuel Beckett's short prose as Kalpo ke Kalpana Mari Parvari Chhe. He translated and published Contemporary Gujarati Poetry (1972) and Maithili Sahitya no Itihas (History of Maithili Literature, 1987) and Ishwarni Yatna (2004).

=== Other ===
Topiwala co-edited Adhunik Sahitya Sangnya-Kosh (1986), a Gujarati dictionary of literary terms. He also edited Vishishta Sahitya Sangnya-Kosh (1988), Gujarati Tunki Varta Kosh (1990), Anuadhunikatavad (1993), Pavan Pagathiya (2004). He also edited Jayant Khatrini Shreshth Vartao (1994).

== Awards ==
He received a Ranjitram Suvarna Chandrak in 2002, Premanand Suvarna Chandrak in 2005, Anantrai Raval Criticism Award and a Sahitya Akademi Award for his critical study Gujarati Sakshibhasya in 2012. He was conferred a Samanvay Bhasha Samman award in 2013 for his contributions to literature.

== See also ==
- List of Gujarati-language writers
