= Premanand Suvarna Chandrak =

- Civilian award for contributions to Literature
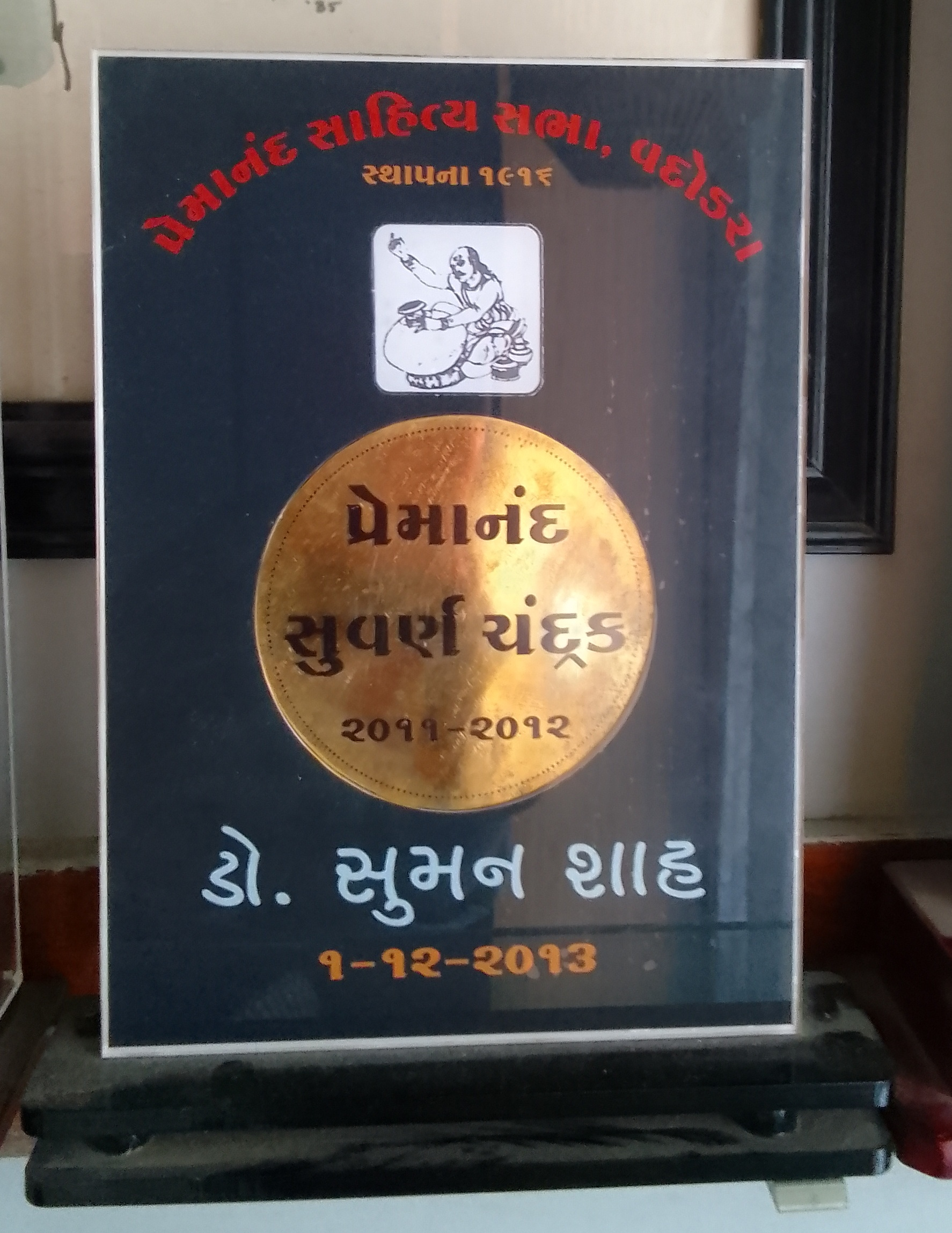
- Award plaque
- Awarded for: Excellence in writing by a Gujarati writer
- Sponsored by: Premanand Sahitya Bhavan, Vadodara
- Location: Gujarat, India
- First award: 1983
- Final award: 2016

Highlights
- First winner: Mareez (posthumously)
- Last winner: Chandrakant Sheth

The Premanand Suvarna Chandrak or Premanand Gold Medal is a literary honour awarded every two years, though sometimes annually, to an established Gujarati writer in order to recognize and promote excellence in Gujarati writing. It is given by an institute of literature, the Premanand Sahitya Bhavan of Vadodara, in remembrance of the Gujarati poet with which it shares its name, Premanand Bhatt. Established in 1916 as the Gujarati Sahitya Sabha and renamed to be the Premanand Sahitya Bhavan in 1944, the organization and institute started this medal in 1983.

== Recipients ==
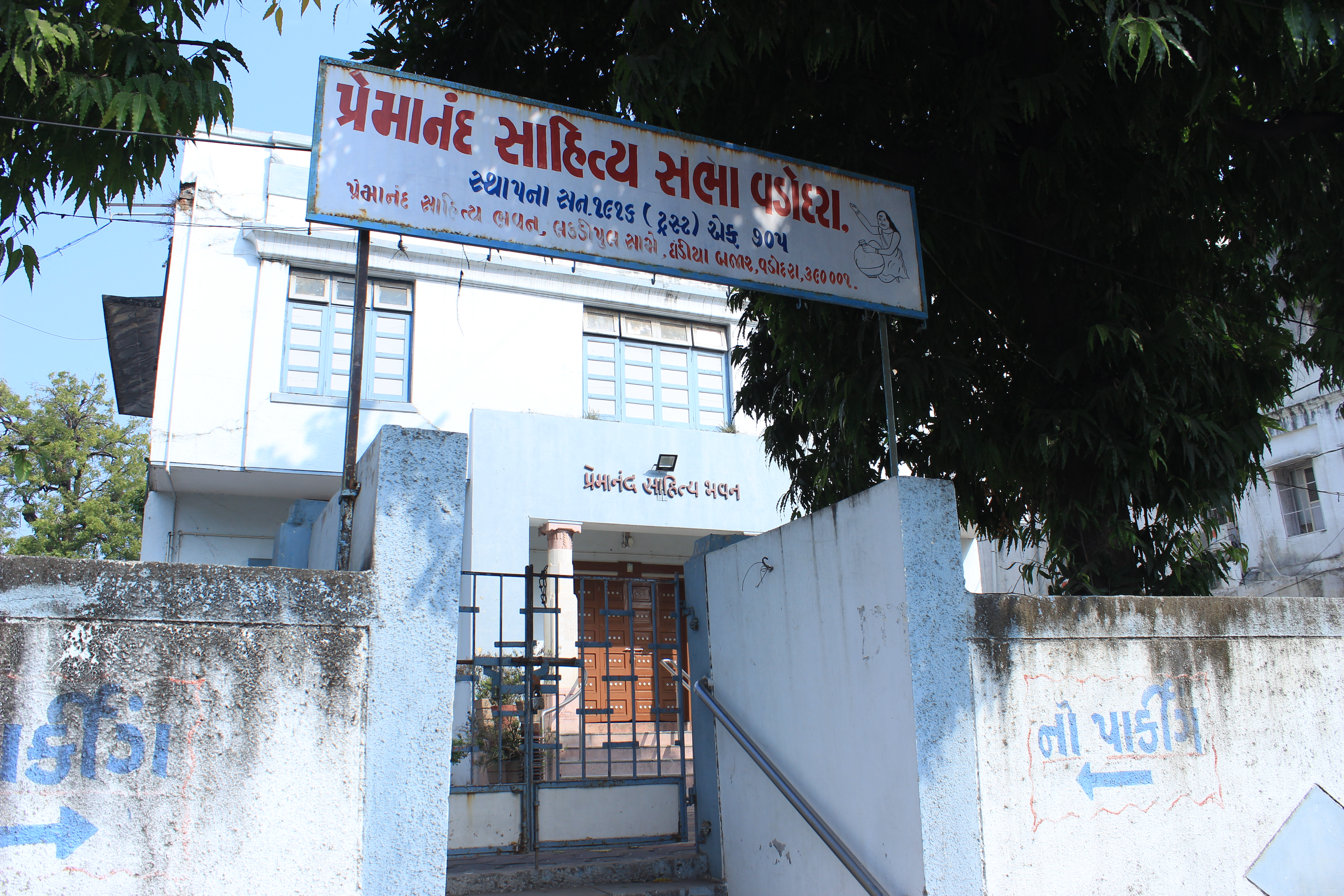
Premanand Sahitya Sabha in Vadodara

List of recipients:

Year	Recipient
1983	Mareez (posthumously)
1985	Vishnuprasad Trivedi
1987	Harivallabh Bhayani
1989	Umashankar Joshi (posthumously)
1991	Dharmiklal Pandya
1992	Suresh Joshi (posthumously); Chandravadan Mehta (posthumously)
1994	Madhu Rye
1996	Priyakant Parikh
1997	Amrut Ghayal
1998	Niranjan Bhagat
2000	Rajendra Shah
2001	Jayant Pathak; Raghuvir Chaudhari
2003	Chandrakant Topiwala
2005-2006	Pravin Darji
2007-2008	Dhiru Parikh
2009-2010	Mohan Parmar
2011-2012	Suman Shah
2013-2014	Lovekumar Desai (posthumously)
2015-2016	Chandrakant Sheth
