= Mohan Parmar =

Indian short story writer, novelist and critic

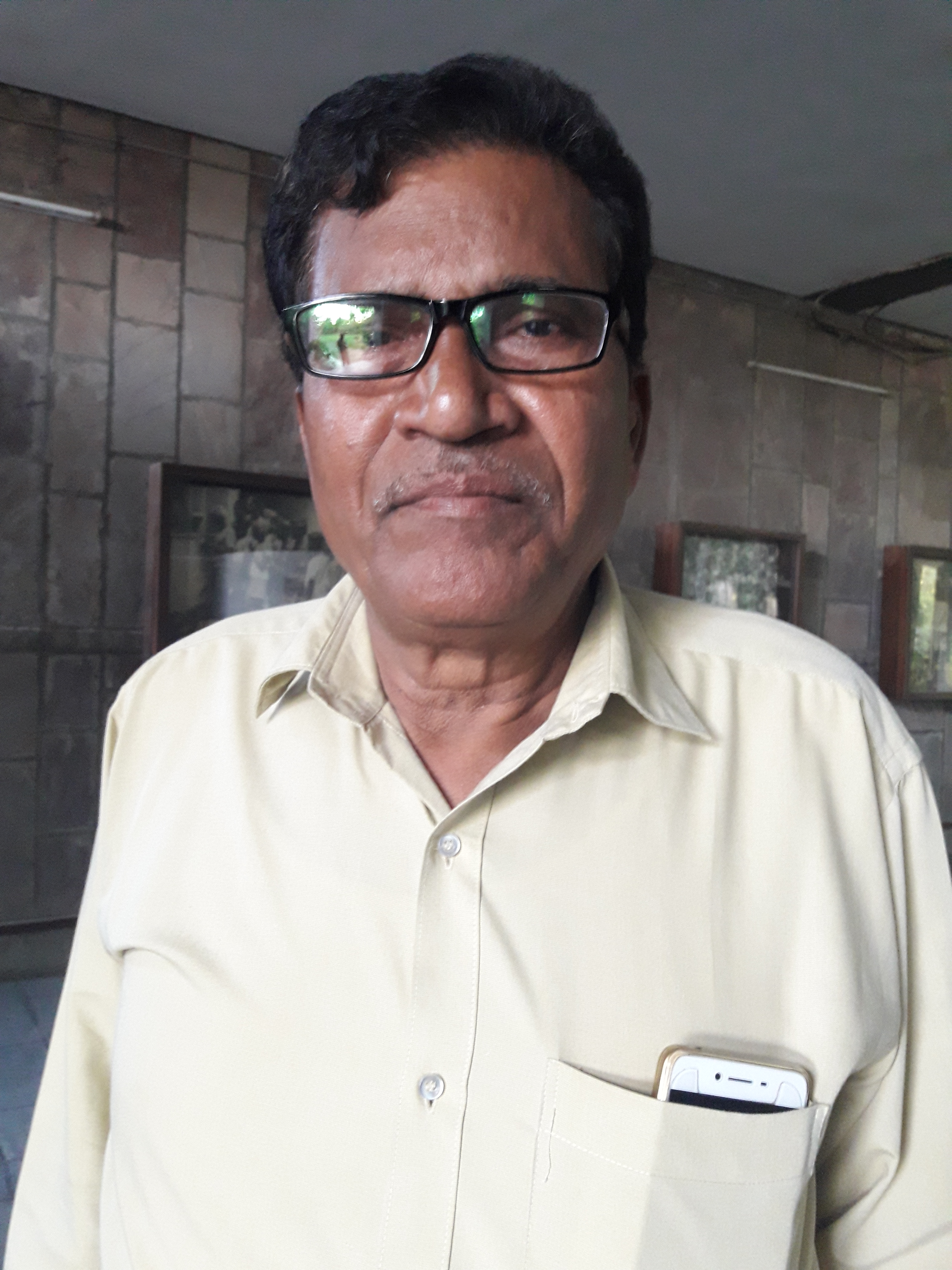
- at ATMA Hall, Ahmedabad, March 2017
- Born: Mohan Ambalal Parmar; 15 March 1948 (age 78); Bhasariya, Mahesana, Gujarat
- Education: Master of Arts; Ph.D.
- Alma mater: Gujarat University
- Occupations: Short story writer, novelist, critic
- Spouse: Jashoda Parmar (1972–present)
- Children: Manoj Parmar (son)
- Writing career
- Language: Gujarati
- Years active: 1975–present
- Period: Postmodern Gujarati literature
- Notable works: Poth (2001); Anchalo (2008)
- Notable awards: Uma-Snehrashmi Prize (2000–2001); Premanand Suvarna Chandrak (2011); Sahitya Akademi Award (2011)
- Literary movement: Gujarati Dalit literature

Academic background
- Thesis: The Distinguishable Dimensions of Short Story after Suresh Joshi Particularly in Reference to Kishor Jadav, Madhu Rai, Radheshyam Sharma and Jyotish Jani
- Doctoral advisor: Chandrakant Topiwala

Mohan Parmar (born 15 March 1948) is an Indian Gujarati-language short story writer, novelist and critic from Gujarat, India. Parmar won the Sahitya Akademi Award for Gujarati in 2011 for his short story collection Anchalo. He was earlier editor of Hayati, an organ of Gujarati Dalit Sahitya Akademi, along with Harish Mangalam. He served as deputy editor of Parab, a monthly journal of Gujarati Sahitya Parishad.

== Early life ==
Parmar was born in Bhasariya, a village in Mahesana district of Gujarat, India to Ambalal and Manchhiben. He completed his primary education from Bhasariya Primary School, and took his secondary education at Linch and Aambaliyasan villages, earning his S.S.C. in 1966. He completed his B.A. in 1982 from Mahesana college with Gujarati literature. He completed M.A. in 1984 as an external student from Gujarat University, earning a Ph.D. in 1994 under Chandrakant Topiwala. His doctoral thesis was The Distinguishable Dimensions of Short Story after Suresh Joshi.

== Works ==
Kolahal, his first short story collection, was published in 1980, followed by Vaayak (1995) and Anchalo (2008). His novels include Bhekhad (1982), Vikriya, Kaalgrasta, Prapti (1990), Neliyu (1992), and Luptavedh (2006). His critical works are published as Sanvitti (1984), Ansaar (1989), and Vartarohan (2005). His research work Suresh Joshi Pachhini Vartana Vishesh Parinamo was published in 2001.

He edited Jyotish Janini Vartasrishti (2013), a collection of selected stories of Jyotish Jani.

== Recognition ==
He won the Sahitya Akademi Award of 2011 for his short story collection Anchalo (2008). He received the Uma-Snehrashmi Prize (2000–01), Sant Kabir Award (2003) and Premanand Suvarna Chandrak (2011).

== Personal life ==
Parmar is a retired administrative officer of Gujarat Maritime Board, Gandhinagar.

== See also ==
- List of Gujarati-language writers
