= Jyotish Jani =

Gujarati Poet

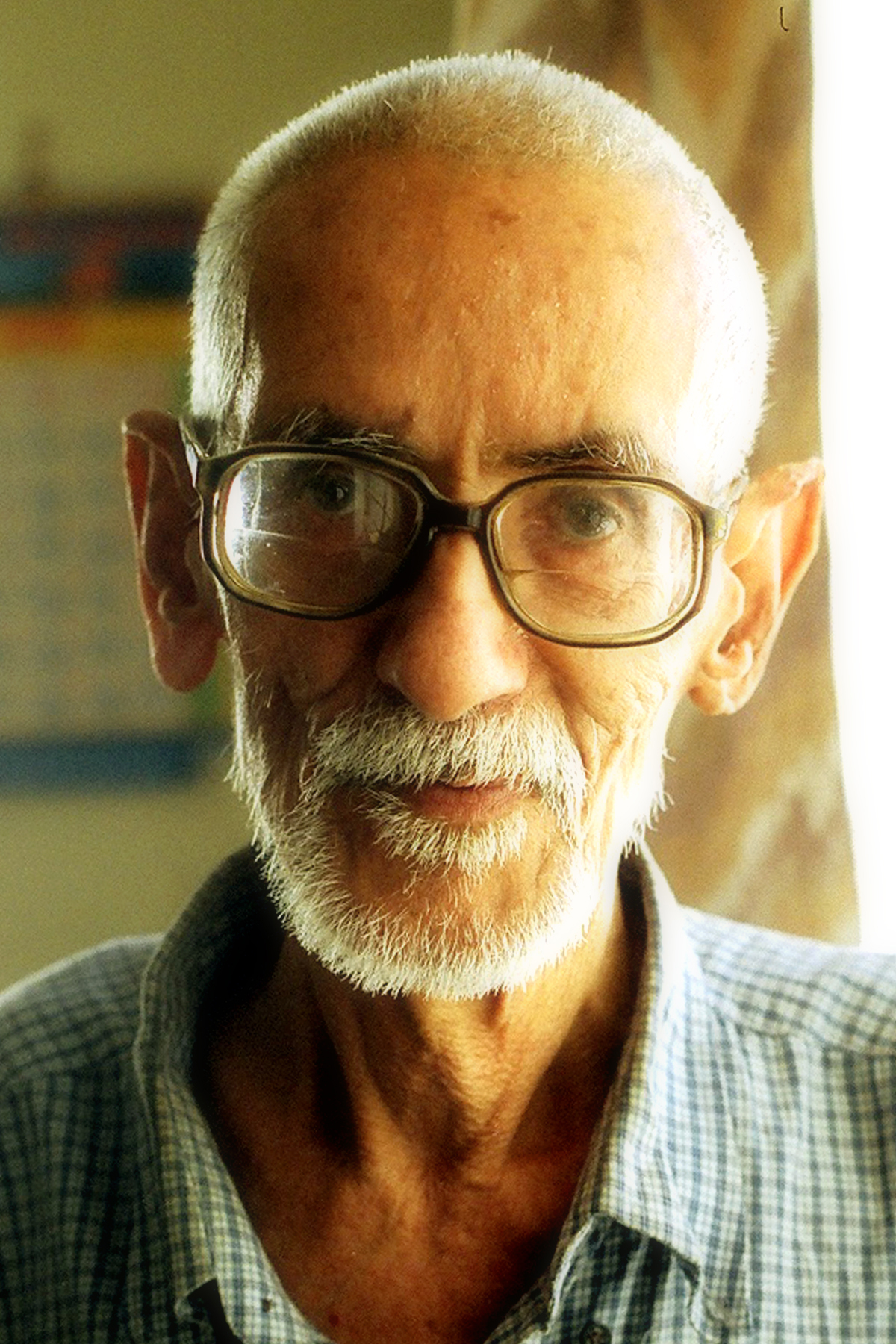
- Jani in 1999
- Born: Jyotish Jagannath Jani; 9 November 1928; Peej village (now in Kheda district, Gujarat
- Died: 2005 (aged 76–77)
- Occupations: Novelist, poet and short story
- Writing career
- Language: Gujarati

Jyotish Jagannath Jani (born 9 November 1928 – 2005) was a Gujarati novelist, poet and short story writer from Gujarat, India.

== Life ==
Jyotish Jani was born on 9 November 1928 at Peej village (now in Kheda district, Gujarat). He studied in Surat and matriculated in 1945. In 1951, he completed B. Sc. in Chemistry from M. T. B. College. He did a Diploma in Journalism in 1963. He had a job in Accountant General in Mumbai which he left and joined editing department in Sandesh daily where he worked from 1962 to 1966. He was appointed subeditor there. In 1966-67, he worked as the Assistant Publicity Officer in Jyoti Limited, Vadodara. From 1974 to 1977, he was the Publicity and Public Relations Officer in Citizen's Council, Vadodara. He served as a subeditor in Gujarat Samachar daily from 1983 to 1986. He later served as a subeditor of Loksatta daily. He was an editor of Sangnya and editor of Shabdasrishti (October 1986 - February 1990) magazines.

He died in 2005.

== Works ==
Jani's first novella, Chakhadie Chadhi Chalya Hasmukhlal was a tragicomedy. Achala (1980) was his second novel. Char Divalo Ek Hanger (1967), Abhnivesh (1975), Pandar Adhunik Vartao (1977) are his collections of short stories. Shabdna Landscape (1981) is his essay collection while Feenni Divalo (1966) is his poetry collection.

Samvad-Vivad (1983) is his work of criticism which includes his questionnaire with Suresh Joshi. Henrik Ibsen is his study work. Urdu Vartao (1972) and Muktamanav (1978) are his translations.

Jyotish Janini Vartasrishti (2013) is a collection of his selected stories edited by Mohan Parmar.

== See also ==
- List of Gujarati-language writers
- Jani (disambiguation)
