= Pravin Darji =

Gujarati Poet

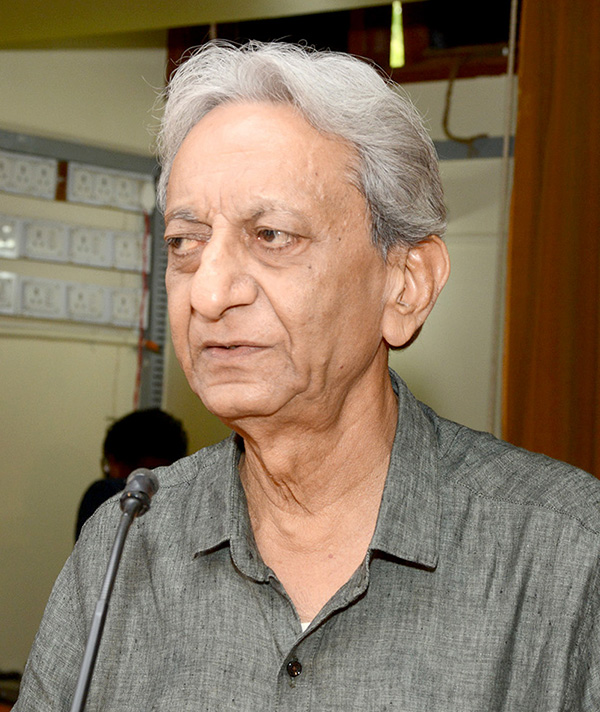
- Pravin Darji at Gujarat Vishwakosh Trust, June 2018
- Born: 23 August 1944 (age 82); Mehlol, Panchmahal, Gujarat, India
- Occupation: Writer
- Years active: since 1973
- Spouse: Ramila
- Children: 3
- Awards: Padma Shri (2011); Kumar Suvarna Chandrak (2011); Ranjitram Suvarna Chandrak (2014)

Academic background
- Thesis: Origin and development of essay in Gujarati literature
- Doctoral advisor: Dhirubhai Thaker

Pravin Darji (born 23 August 1944) is Gujarati essayist, poet, critic and editor from India. He was awarded Padma Shri in 2011.

== Life ==
Pravin Darji was born on 23 August 1944 in Mahelol village in Panchmahal district of Gujarat, India. He completed SSC in 1961 and BA in Gujarati and Sanskrit in 1965. He completed MA in 1967 from Gujarat University and PhD in 1973. He taught Gujarati in Arts College in Modasa from 1965 to 1967. He joined Lunavada College as a Professor in 1967 and served there until his retirement. He served as a chairman of the University Book Production Board for a year. He briefly edited Shabdashrishti, a literary magazine of Gujarat Sahitya Akademi.

Pravin Darji married Ramila and they have two daughters and a son.

== Works ==
Adakhe Padakhe (1982), Leelaparna (1984), Ghasna Phool (1990), Pancham (1996), Gata Zarana (1997), Madhyabinduna Kamp (2003), Dadami Te Chakshu (2004), Pariprashna (2005), Motino Charo, Ayakhana Ank (1988), Sannikat (1993), Darbhankur, Venurav are his collections of essays.

Chees (1973), Utsedh (1985), Io (2005) are his poetry collections. Chandanna Vriksh (1991) and Ka Katha (2005) are his biographical works. Himalayna Khole (2001) and Nava Desh, Nava Vesh (2003) are his travelogues.

His PhD thesis Nibandh: Swarup ane Vikas (on essays) was published in 1975. His other work on essays is Lalitnibandh (1986). His other works of criticism are Seema Parno Shabda (1990), Spand (1976), Charvana (1976), Dayaram (1978), Pratyagra (1978), Navalkatha Swarup (1986), Pashchat (1982), Vipula Cha Prithvi (1983), Kavyasang (2000), Purakalpan (1989), Irony (1995). He edited Gujarati Bhashani Ketlik Vishishta Vartao (1984), Gadya Sanchay Volume 2 (1982), Harishchandrana Kavyo (1983), 121 Gujaarti Vartao ane Vartakaro (1994), Niravrutt (2007). He co-edited Shabdashri (1980). He translated Saundaryo Hahu Janmya Nathi (1990).

== Awards ==
He received Sanskar Award (1986), Hari Om Award (1988), Sanskritik Gaurav Award (2002), Anantrai Raval Criticism Award (2003), Sanskriti Award (2005), Kala Gurjari Award (2007), Sanskar Chandrak (1978), Viththalbhai Patel Suvarna Chandrak (1992), Premanand Suvarna Chandrak (2005), Dhanji Kanji Gandhi Suvarna Chandrak and Dahyabhai Patel Suvarna Chandrak. He also received Kumar Suvarna Chandrak in 2011. The Government of India honored him with the fourth highest civilian award of Padma Shri in 2011.

== See also ==
- List of Gujarati-language writers
