= Joelle Taylor =

British writer

Joelle Taylor FRSL
- Born: 1967 (age 58–59); Lancashire, United Kingdom
- Occupations: Poet, performer, playwright, educator
- Writing career
- Period: 1995–present
- Genres: Poetry, plays, non-fiction
- Notable awards: UK Performance Poetry Slam Champion, 2000; T. S. Eliot Prize, 2021
- Website: joelletaylor.co.uk

Joelle Taylor RSL (born 1967) is a poet, playwright and author. She was elected a Fellow of the Royal Society of Literature in 2022.

== Early life ==
Taylor was born in Lancashire.

== Career ==
She founded SLAMbassadors, the UK's national youth slam championships, for The Poetry Society in 2001, and was its artistic director and national coach until 2018. Her collection Songs My Enemy Taught Me was published by longtime collaborator Anthony Anaxagorou in 2017, through his company, Out-Spoken Press.

She has toured the UK several times as a solo poet, as well as Australia and South East Asia in 2018. She is the poet in residence at a number of schools, and performs and teaches across the country. She is a Subject for Study on the OCR GCSE English curriculum. Her current emphasis is on working with groups of marginalised women globally, and on publishing their writing on her website, as well as on her online blog The Night Alphabet to coincide with her debut book of short stories of the same name. She co-curates and hosts Out-Spoken, a monthly live poetry and music night currently in long-term residence at London's Southbank Centre. She is commissioning editor of Out-Spoken Press for 2021–22.

== Political views ==
In December 2019, along with 42 other cultural figures, Taylor signed a letter endorsing the Labour Party under Jeremy Corbyn's leadership in the 2019 general election. The letter stated that "Labour's election manifesto under Jeremy Corbyn's leadership offers a transformative plan that prioritises the needs of people and the planet over private profit and the vested interests of a few."

== Personal life ==
Taylor is based in London.

== Publications ==
- Naming (1994) – a play
- Whorror Stories (1995) – a play
- Lesbians Talk Violent Relationships (with Tracy Chandler, 1995, Scarlet Press) – non-fiction
- Whorror Stories II (1996) – a play
- Lucid Johnston (2000) – a play
- Ska Tissue (2011, Mother Foucault Press – poetry
- The Woman Who Was Not There (2014, Burning Eye Books) – poetry
- Songs My Enemy Taught Me (2017, Out-Spoken Press) – poetry
- C+nto: & Othered Poems (2021, Westbourne Press) – poetry
- The Night Alphabet (2024) – a novel

== Awards ==
- 2000: UK Performance Poetry Slam Champion
- 2016: Fellowship of the Arts
- 2017: Long listed for the Jerwood Compton Poetry Fellowship
- 2021: T. S. Eliot Prize for C+nto: & Othered Poems
- 2022: Polari Prize for Book of the Year for C+nto: & Othered Poems
- 2022: Fellow of the Royal Society of Literature
