= Bhupati Mohan Sen =

Indian physicist and mathematician (1888–1978)

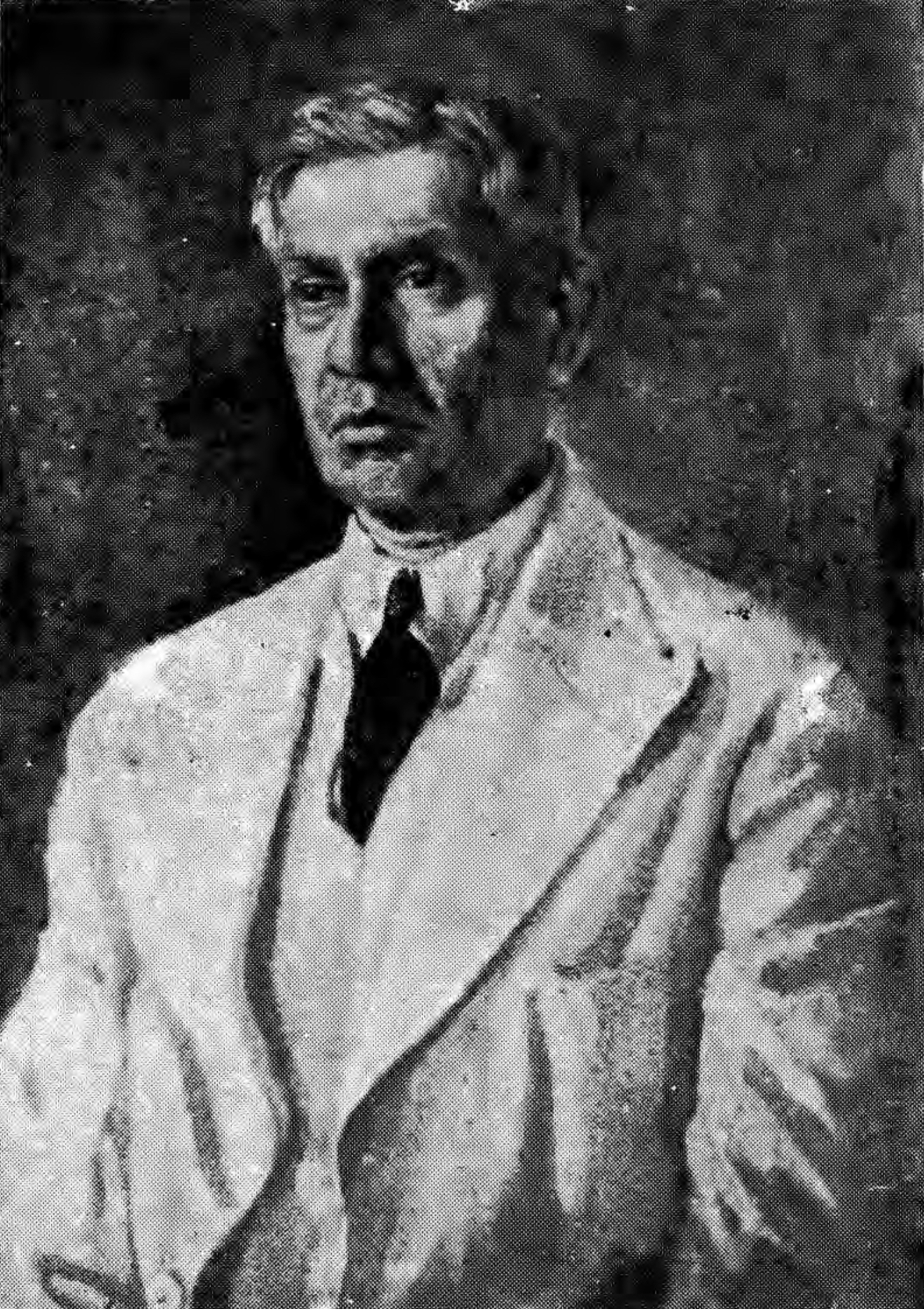
- Born: 3 January 1888; Rajshahi, Bengal Presidency, British India
- Died: 24 September 1978 (aged 90); Kolkata, India
- Education: University of Calcutta, Cambridge University
- Scientific career
- Fields: Physics, Mathematics
- Workplaces: Presidency University, Kolkata; University of Calcutta

Signature
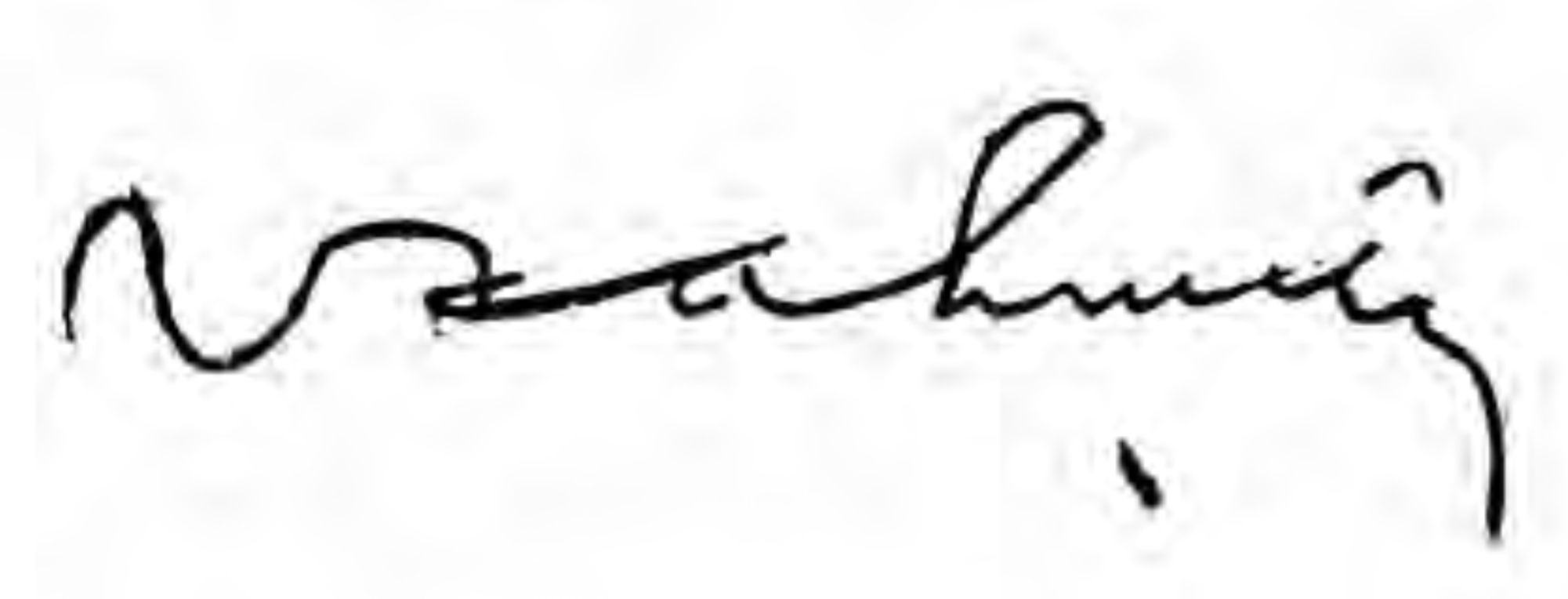

Bhupati Mohan Sen was an Indian physicist and mathematician. He made remarkable contributions in the fields of Quantum Mechanics and Fluid Mechanics. He taught at the Mathematics Department of Presidency College and Applied Mathematics Department of University of Calcutta. He was also a member of the Governing Body of Bose Institute. In 1974, he was awarded Padma Bhushan by Government of India.

== Birth and family ==
Bhupathi Mohan Sen was born on 1 March 1888 in Rajshahi (now in Bangladesh). His father Raj Mohan Sen was Professor of Mathematics and Vice-Principal of Rajshahi Government College. His mother, Nishi Tara Devi, was a very devoted and pious lady.

He married Santa Sircar, daughter of Sir Nilratan Sircar, with whom he had one daughter and two sons - Monishi Mohan Sen and Subrata Kumar Sen.

== Educational life ==
Bhupathi Mohan Sen had his early education in Rajshahi Collegiate School and Rajshahi College. After completing school education he took admission in Presidency College and passed his B.Sc. Examination in 1908, with triple Honours, first class in Mathematics, second class in Physics and second class in Chemistry. In 1910 he obtained the M.Sc. degree from Calcutta University occupying first position in the first class in Applied Mathematics. After completing his M.Sc. degree he went to Cambridge as a foundation scholar of King's College for the period 1911–1915. In 1912 he took up his M.A. degree of Cambridge University obtaining the distinction of being a Senior Wrangler with the mark of distinction in special subjects. In 1914 he won Smith's prize from Cambridge University for his very great academic distinction. He was the first Indian to win this prize.

== Working life ==
After returning India In 1915, he entered into Indian Educational Service. He was Professor of Mathematics of Dacca Government College from 1915 to 1921 and was Professor of Mathematics of Dacca University from 1921 to 1923. In 1923 he returned Calcutta and joined Presidency College (Presidency University) as Professor of Mathematics and held this position from 1923 to 1930. In 1931 he officiated as Principal of Presidency College and was confirmed in the post in 1934. In 1934 he became principal of the Presidency College and held the post for the period 1934-42 and retired from Government Service in 1943. After retirement, he was appointed Part-time Professor of Pure Mathematics, Presidency College, Calcutta University and held the same post till 1954 when he retired from University Service.

== Research Area ==
Sen's research work was concentrated in the following subjects:

- Differential Geometry
- Hydrodynamics
- Modern Physics

He published a seminal paper in Nature in 1933. His paper titled Tidal Oscillation on a Spheroid was published in the Bulletin of Calcutta Mathematical Society. He was authored two books titled A New Classical Theory of the Photon and the Electron and Light and Matter: A New Classical Theory of Light and Matter based on the Maxwell Equations and the Special Relativity Theory with criticisms of the existing theories'.
