= Prakash N. Shah =

Indian writer, editor and journalist

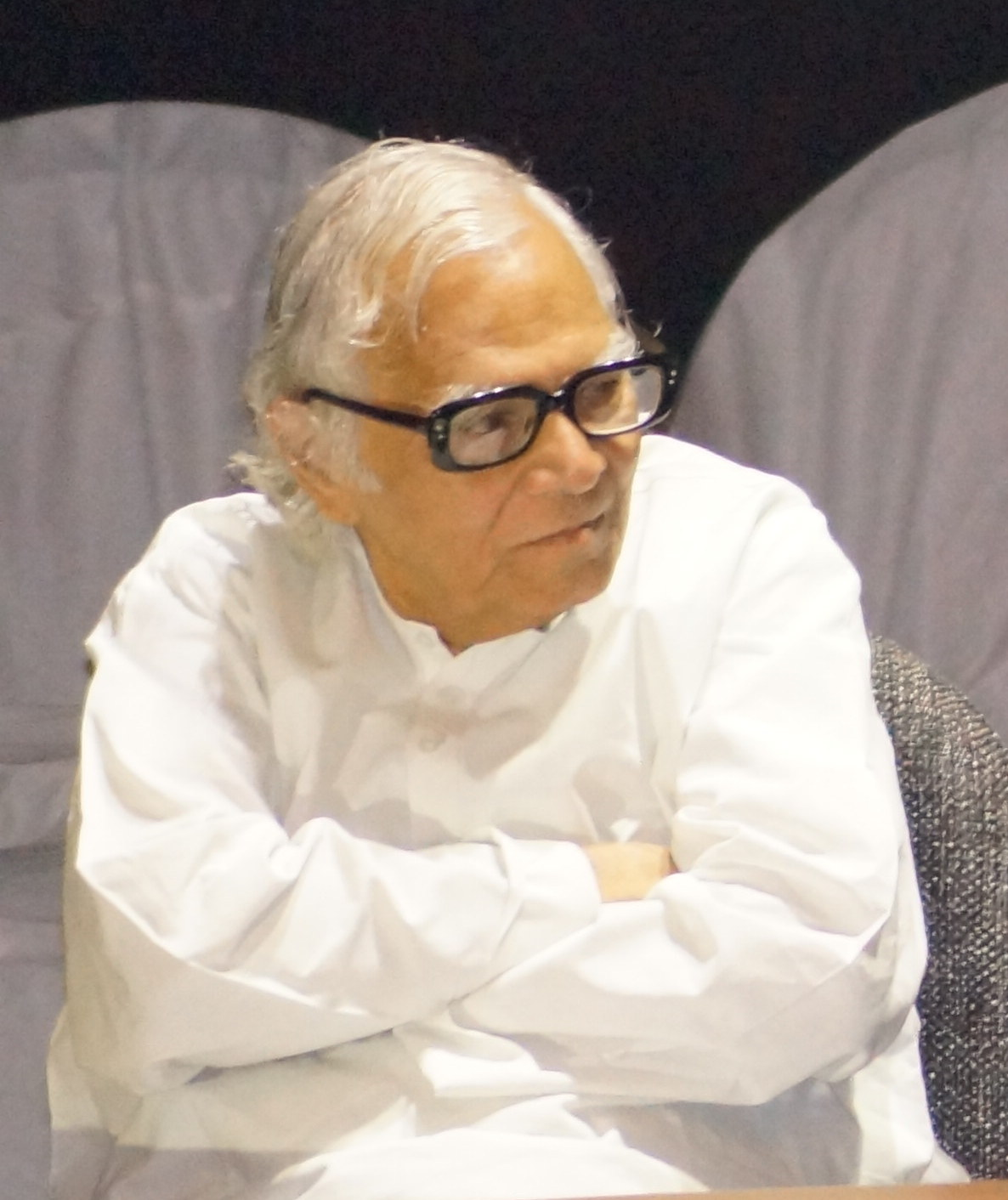
- Prakash N. Shah in 2013
- Born: 12 September 1940 (age 85); Manasa, British India
- Education: Post graduate in political science
- Occupations: Editor, journalist and writer
- Spouse: Naynabahen
- Writing career
- Language: Gujarati
- Notable work: Editor of Nirikshak (magazine)

Prakash N. Shah (born 12 September 1940) is an Indian writer, editor and journalist from Gujarat, India. He was appointed the president of Gujarati Sahitya Parishad (Gujarati Literary Council) in 2020.

== Early life ==
Prakash N. Shah was born to his father Naveenchandra Lalbhai and mother Induben on 12 September 1940 in Manasa, Gujarat. His father's business career led to his primary education in Amritsar and Vadodara. He completed his secondary education from Sarasvati Mandir High School, Maninagar, Ahmedabad. He received M.A. in political science.

== Career ==
In 1965, Shah joined H. K. Arts College, Ahmedabad as a professor of political science. Earlier, he was involved in a creative and ideological awareness campaign of a youth organisation named 'Aarat'. He was also active in the editing work of Vishvamanav magazine and the activities of Gandhi Shanti Prasthan. In 1971, he quit his job as a professor and joined the Sardar Patel University, Vallabh Vidyanagar, as a co-editor in the Gyangangotri book series with Bhogilal Gandhi.

In 1974, Shah participated in Navnirman Andolan. He was co-secretary of the Janata Morcha. During the political chaos of the emergency, he was arrested under a MISA in a protest against the abolition of civil rights. Initially he was placed in Palanpur sub-jail and then shifted to the central jail of Vadodara for ten months (till January 1977). Later, he became active in journalism. He remained associated with the JanSata-Loksata newspaper till 1990. He also wrote in newspapers like Divya Bhaskar, Gujarat Today, Gujarat Mitra and Samkalin. He served for four years as an administrative secretary of the Gujarati Sahitya Parishad.

He is well known as editor of the Nirikshak magazine. His preface to Maari Vachankatha (Manubhai Pancholi), Rudraveena no Zankar (Bhanu Adhvaryu) and the Gujarati translation of Acharya Kripalani's autobiography is considered to be his significant work in Gujarati literature. He is currently the president of the Gujarati Sahitya Parishad.

== Personal life ==
Shah is married to Naynabahen. They have two daughters.

== See also ==
- List of Gujarati-language writers
