= Bhupat Vadodaria =

- Born: 19 February 1929; Dhrangadhra, Gujarat
- Died: 4 November 2011 (aged 82); Ahmedabad

Bhupat Vadodaria (19 February 1929 – 4 October 2011) was an Indian author and journalist. He worked with various newspapers in Gujarat and in the Information Office of Government of Gujarat before founding his own media group. He had authored more than fifty books.

== Life ==
Vadodaria was born in Dhrangadhra, Gujarat on 19 February 1929. His father Chhotalal died when he was three years old. He was raised by his mother Chaturaben. He completed Bachelor of Science in 1946.

After working with Lokshakti daily for sometime, he joined as the youngest editor of Phhulchhab daily in 1955, when he was twenty six years old. In 1962 he moved to Ahmedabad. He worked with Lokmanya as an editor, with Sandesh as a news editor and with Gujarat Samachar as a co-editor. He worked as the director of information department of Government of Gujarat from 1982 to 1986. In 1986 he founded Sambhaav media group which runs various newspapers and magazines. He served as the chairman of Gujarat Sahitya Akademi from 1984 to 1986.

He died on 4 October 2011 at Ahmedabad. He was cremated at Thaltej crematorium.

== Works ==
He authored more than fifty books. He wrote columns in magazines and newspapers like Panchaamrit in Abhiyaan weekly and Ghare Bahire in Gujarat Samachar. Kasumbi no Rang (1952), Jivan Jivavanu Bal (1955), Antarna Roop (1958) are his short story collections. His essays and column writings are published under titles Ghare Bahire volume-1 to 5 (1958–1982) and Azadi ni Abohawa (1987). His novel Prem Ek Pooja won him Gujarati Sahitya Academy award in 1978.

== See also ==
- List of Gujarati-language writers
