= Suman Shah =

Indian writer, editor and translator (born 1939)

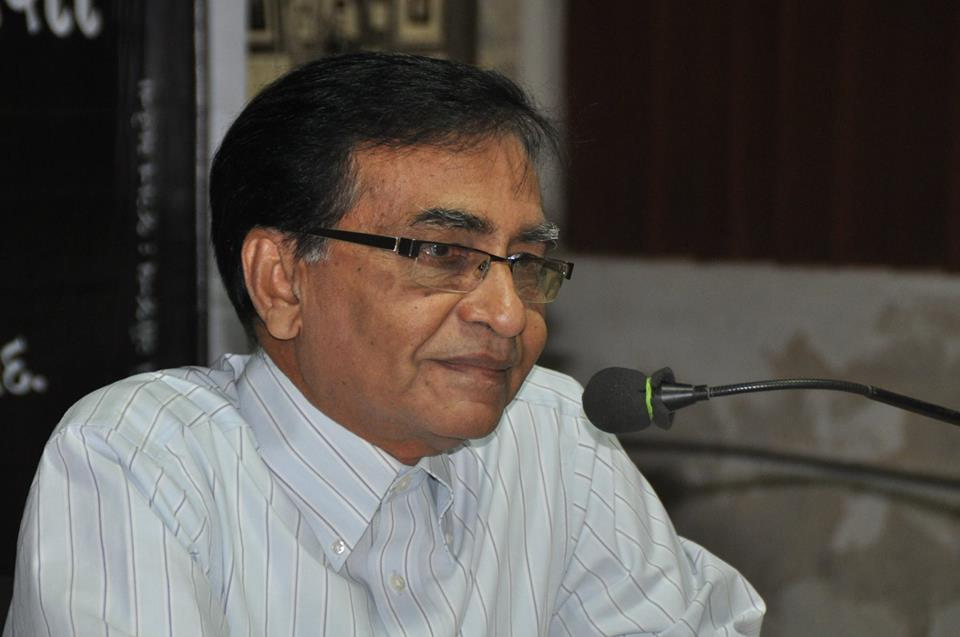
- Suman Shah at Gujarati Sahitya Parishad in August 2015
- Born: Sumanchandra Govindalal Shah; 1 November 1939 (age 87); Dabhoi, Vadodara, Gujarat
- Education: Master of Arts; Ph.D; M.S University, Vadodara; Gujarat Vidyapith
- Occupations: Critic, short story writer, novelist, essayist, Editor, translator
- Spouse: Rashmita (m. 1965; died 2016)
- Children: Purvarag, Madir
- Writing career
- Language: Gujarati
- Years active: 1957 - present
- Period: postmodern Gujarati literature
- Genres: Short story, Novel, Essay, Criticism
- Notable works: Suresh Joshi thi Suresh Joshi (1978); Khadaki (1987); Sahityaman Adhunikata (1988); Bajbaji (1989); Avarshunkelub (1992); Jenti-Hansa Symphony (1992); Fatfatiyun (2006)
- Notable awards: Sahitya Akademi Award (2008); Premanand Suvarna Chandrak (2013); Sahitya Gaurav Puraskar (2014)
- Movements: Existentialism, Surrealism, Modernism, Postmodernism, Structuralism, Post-structuralism, Postcolonialism

Academic background
- Thesis: Suresh Joshi: His Literature and its Impact upon Modern Gujarati Literature (2000)
- Doctoral advisor: Mohanbhai Patel
- Website: Official website

Suman Shah is a Gujarati language critic, short story writer, novelist, essayist, editor and translator from Gujarat, India. He won the Sahitya Akademi Award in 2008 for his short story collection Fatfatiyun. He has written both in the modern and in the postmodern eras in Gujarati literature. He has authored more than 74 books, including 2 novels, 6 short story collections, 4 collections of creative essays, 6 translations into Gujarati from English and Hindi, 22 books on literary criticism and around 23 edited works of literary theory and modern Gujarati short stories and poems. He was honorary editor of Shabdasrishti from 1983 to 1986 and an editor of Khevna, a literary journal, from 1987 to 2009.

== Early life ==
Shah was born on 1 November 1939 in Dabhoi, Vadodara district, Gujarat, to Govindlal and Kundanbahen. He took his primary education in Dabhoi Prathamik Shala. He finished his secondary education from Vibhag High School, Dabhoi in 1957. He joined M. S. University to obtain a Bachelor of Commerce, but left it for the Arts College in Dabhoi in 1959. He was graduated in 1962 with a major in Gujarati literature and a minor in Sanskrit. In 1964, he completed his Master of Arts in Gujarati and Sanskrit literature from M. S. University in Vadodara. Under the guidance of Mohanbhai Shankarbhai Patel, he obtained a PhD degree for his thesis Suresh Joshi: His Literature and its Impact upon Modern Gujarati Literature in 1978 from Gujarat Vidyapith.

== Career ==
Shah taught Gujarati literature in various schools, universities and colleges for 42 years (1962 to 2004). He started his career in 1962 as a secondary school teacher for Gujarati language and literature at Dayaram Sharada Mandir, Dabhoi. He taught Gujarati literature from 1966 to 1972 at Municipal Arts College in Kapadvanj. In 1972, he joined T.C. Kapadia Arts College in Bodeli as Professor of Gujarati Literature and served as principal of the college until 1977. In 1977, he joined the Department of Gujarati Language and Literature at the School of Language at Gujarat University in Ahmedabad, and headed the department from 1992 to 2002. He served as a Professor Emeritus appointed by the University Grant Commission for two years. He also served as a Writer-In-Residence at the University of Pennsylvania in the United States.

== Literary career ==
Shah started his writing career in 1957. In 1958, he published a short story in Aaram, a Gujarati magazine edited by Pitanbar Patel. Subsequently, he published in other Gujarati literary magazines including Shabdasrishti, Tathapi, Samipe, Etad and Farbus Traimasik. He is a founder member of several literary and educational organization such as Suresh Joshi Sahityavichar Forum (SJSF) since 1989. The SJSF is dedicated to seminars and workshops for short story writing. He is also a founding member of two other educational organizations: Sannidhan (since 1991) and Punarapi (since 2011). Sannidhan is dedicated to teaching programs in connection with university curricula while Punarapi is dedicated to training programs for college and university teachers.

== Works ==
=== Novel ===
His first novel, Khadki, was published in 1987, followed by Bajbaji (1989). Salam Amarica Urfe Mari Vidyayatra (1996), a travelogue, is an account of his travel across the United States.

=== Short story ===
His short stories dealt with the complexity of human lives, especially the kind that exists between a married couple, as evident in his collection Jenti - Hansa Symphony (1992). Avarshunkelub (1976), his first collection of short stories, reflected his modernist tendencies. The stories are experimental in nature with phenomenological and absurdist backdrops, although some of the stories, such as "Kakajini Bodhkatha", are notable for their mixture of experimentalism and traditional storytelling. His second collection of short stories, Jenti Hansa Symphony (1992), is a work which is considered a breakthrough in Shah's literary career. From modernist tendencies he went to adapt postmodern sensibilities with regard to world view and style. Shah noted that he became most concerned about narration and narratology. Fatfatiyun, published in 2006, further enhanced the reputation of Shah as a chief short story writer of his era. The stories stand up for the variety of themes and lighthearted treatment while dealing with social issues like an earthquake ("Cement"), rape ("Khanjar") and riots ("E.E.W"). Stories like "Two Twenty Thousand Lagi" and "Lemon Tea ane Biscuit" revolve around urban life. Kagarol Unlimited (2010), his fourth collection, is a work which marks a major departure in Shah's literary world. For the first time he gets socially concerned, breaking his own world of urban characters, mainly an upper-middle class married couple. As in the title story, he mixes fantasy with narrative to depict the harsh reality of the villagers in contemporary India and how they are impacted by political goons. Some of the stories in this collection contain his earlier characters Jenti and Hansa. In these, Shah explores the theme of writerly crisis, mainly whether to write about others' pain, as there is a lot of suffering in this world, or to write about one self, as true writing can never be done without looking into one's own self. His other collections of short stories are No Idea, Get Idea (2013) and DhisoomDhisoom (2014), which contain various themed stories like "Kanchan Thodo Giligili Chhe" (urban bisexuality), "Ae ane Territorial Birds" (suffering of migrants) and "Wolkswagon Chhokro ane Renault Duster Chhokri" (impact of market on urban sexual fantasy).

=== Criticism ===
Shah has worked both in theoretical and applied criticism.

He is noted in Gujarati literature for his works of theoretical criticism Sartra No Sahityavichar (1980), Sahityama Adhunikta (1988) and Anu-adhunikta Ane Apane (2008). His other works of theoretical criticism include Vivechan: Char Mudda (1975), "Navya Vivechan" Pachhi (1977), Sahityik Sanshodhan Vishe (1980), Khevna (1984), Saranchana Ne Saranchan (1986), Adhunik Gujarati Kavita Ane Sarjakchetna (1988), Sangyan (1991), Sahityik Artha No Koyado (2000), Katha-Siddhanta (2002) and Siddhante Kim? (2008). His works of applied criticism include Chandrakant Bakshi Thi Fero (1973), Suresh Joshi Thi Suresh Joshi (1978, PhD thesis), Niranjan Bhagat (1981), Umashankar: Samagra Kavitana Kavi: Ek Profile (1982), Kavi-Vivechak Eliot (1987), Kathapad (1989), Kavyapad (2002), Vishwanavalkatha (2007), Nisbatpurvak (2011), Khevnapurvak (2011) and Bhakta-Kavi Dayaramni Kavyasrushti (2012)

=== Essay ===
Wait a beat, his first collection of essays, was published in 1987, followed by Byline (1990), Media-Message (1993), Vastusanchar (2005) and Sahitya Sahitya (2015).

=== Translation ===
He has translated several works from English into Gujarati: Chekhov's Three Sisters as Tran Baheno (1965), Dostoyevsky's The Meek One as Vinita (1985), Beckett's Waiting for Godot as Godoni Raahma (1990), M.k Naik's History of Indian English Literature as Bharatiy Angreji Sahitya No Itihaas (1999) and Harold Pinter's A Slight Ache as Bhamri (2007). He has also translated Nisarg, a novel by Kannad writer Mirgy Anna Ray from Hindi.

=== Editing ===
He has introduced some literary forms by editing seven books: Atmakatha (autobiography), Jivankatha (biography), Navalkatha (novel), Tunki Varta (short story), Sonnet (sonnet), Lalit Nibandh (essay) and Khandakavya (narrative poetry) published during 1983 to 1987. He edited some short story collections including Suresh Joshi Thi Satyajit Sharma (1975), Ketlik Vartao (1992), Ketlik Gujarati Tunki Vartao (1993; in collaboration with Gulabdas Broker), 1995:Ketlik Vartao (1995), Ujhani (2004; collection of stories of writers from Suresh Joshi Sahitya Forum) and Varta Re Varta (2015; Collection of 47 short stories with editorial note). His other significant works of editing include Aathma Daykani Kavita (1982), Aatmanepadi (1987; collection of interviews of Suresh Joshi) and Vansaladi (1990; collection of articles written on Dayaram's poetry).

== Recognition ==
He received Ravindra Chandrak in 1961 and the Hargovindadas Kantawala Gold Medal in 1964. He received the Sahitya Akademi Award in 2008 for his short story collection Fatfatiyun. Fatfatiyun was also awarded the Raman Pathak Shashtipurti Prize (2006–2007) instituted by Gujarati Sahitya Parishad. He is also a recipient of the Ramprasad Premshankar Bakshi Prize (2002–2003) for his work Kathasiddhanta, Premanand Suvarna Chandrak (2013) and Sahitya Gaurav Puraskar (2014).

== Personal life ==
Shah married Rashmita in 1965 and they have two sons, Purvarag and Madir. His wife died in 2016.

== See also ==
- List of Gujarati-language writers

Awards
| Preceded by Rajendra Shukla | Recipient of the Sahitya Akademi Award winners for Gujarati; 2008 | Succeeded by Shirish Panchal |
