= Bhupat Singh =

Indian bandit from the 1940s and 1950s

Bhupat Singh was a famous dacoit in India in the late 1940s and early 1950s. He was responsible for delaying the 1951–52 Indian general election. He was active in Saurashtra (state). Later, he came to Pakistan, converted to Islam, and adopted the name "Amin Yusuf". In 1956, Indian prime minister Jawaharlal Nehru and Pakistani prime minister Mohammad Ali Bogra discussed secretly about handing Bhupat to India. However, when this was reported in Indian media, Pakistani officials stepped back. He died in 2006 and left behind two sons and two daughters.
