= Bhogilal Gandhi =

Indian writer and freedom fighter

Bhogilal Chunilal Gandhi
- Born: 26 January 1911; Modasa, Gujarat, India
- Died: 10 June 2001 (aged 90); Vadodara, Gujarat, India
- Education: Gujarat Vidyapith
- Occupations: scholar; poet; critic; translator; freedom fighter
- Writing career
- Language: Gujarati

Bhogilal Chunilal Gandhi (26 January 1911 – 10 June 2001) was an Indian scholar, poet, critic, translator, and independence activist from Gujarat, India. He edited Vishvamanav, a Gujarati-language literary-socio-political journal. He wrote biographies of several writers and political figures including Leo Tolstoy, Joseph Stalin, C. Rajagopalachari, Subhas Chandra Bose, Romain Rolland, Durgaram Mehta, and Narmad. He translated many works into Gujarati from English and Bengali languages. In his early years, he came under the influence of Communism, and became an active member of Communist Party of India.

== Biography ==
Bhogilal Gandhi was born on 26 January 1911 in Modasa, a town in Gujarat, India. He passed his matriculation exam in 1926 from Bharuch. He graduated from Gujarat Vidyapith, Ahmedabad.

He came under influence of Communism in his early life, and became an active member of Communist Party of India, along with his wife Subhadra Gandhi. He was arrested several times between 1928 and 1951 due to his involvement in political activities. He died on 10 June 2001 in Vadodara, Gujarat.

== Works ==
Gandhi's pen name was Upvasi. Sadhana, a collection of his poems, was published in 1943 with the preface by Umashankar Joshi. The poems of Sadhana are divided into three sections namely Pranaya (love), Jhankhana (longing), and Sadhana (meditation). He published his literary criticism and book reviews in Mitakshar (In Brief; 1970). He published two short story collections, Parajit Prem (1957) and Lata (1967).

Gandhi translated several works from English and Bengali languages. He translated Maxim Gorky's Mother into Gujarati.

He wrote biographies of Leo Tolstoy as Leo Tolstoy : Jivansangram, Joseph Stalin as Yugpurush Stalin, C. Rajagopalachari as Rajagopalachari, Subhas Chandra Bose as Shubhashchandra, Romain Rolland as Mahamanav Romain Rolland, Durgaram Mehta as Aadya Sudharak Mahetaji Durgaram, and Narmad as Narmad: Navyug no Prahari.

A memorial volume for Gandhi, Bhogilal Gandhi Janmashatabdi Grantha, was published on his birth centenary in 2011, edited by Prakash N. Shah, Raman Soni, and Rajendra Patel.

== See also ==
- List of Gujarati-language writers
