= Indian Languages Festival =

Annual festival in New Delhi, India

Samanvay, Indian Languages Festival
- Genre: Literary and cultural festival
- Locations: New Delhi, India
- Years active: 2011 – present
- Website: http://ilfsamanvay.org

Samanvay, Indian Languages Festival is the initiative of India Habitat Centre. It is held annually in New Delhi. The first Samanvay was held in 2011.

The festival bestows various awards:

- The Vani Award for Distinguished Translator
- The Samanvay Bhasha Samman which is given to recognise "a litterateur-par-excellence’s contribution to Indian Literature",
- The Samanvay Bhashai Patrakarita Samman for journalists working in Indian languages
