= Vishnu Pandya =

Indian writer, journalist, biographer and poet

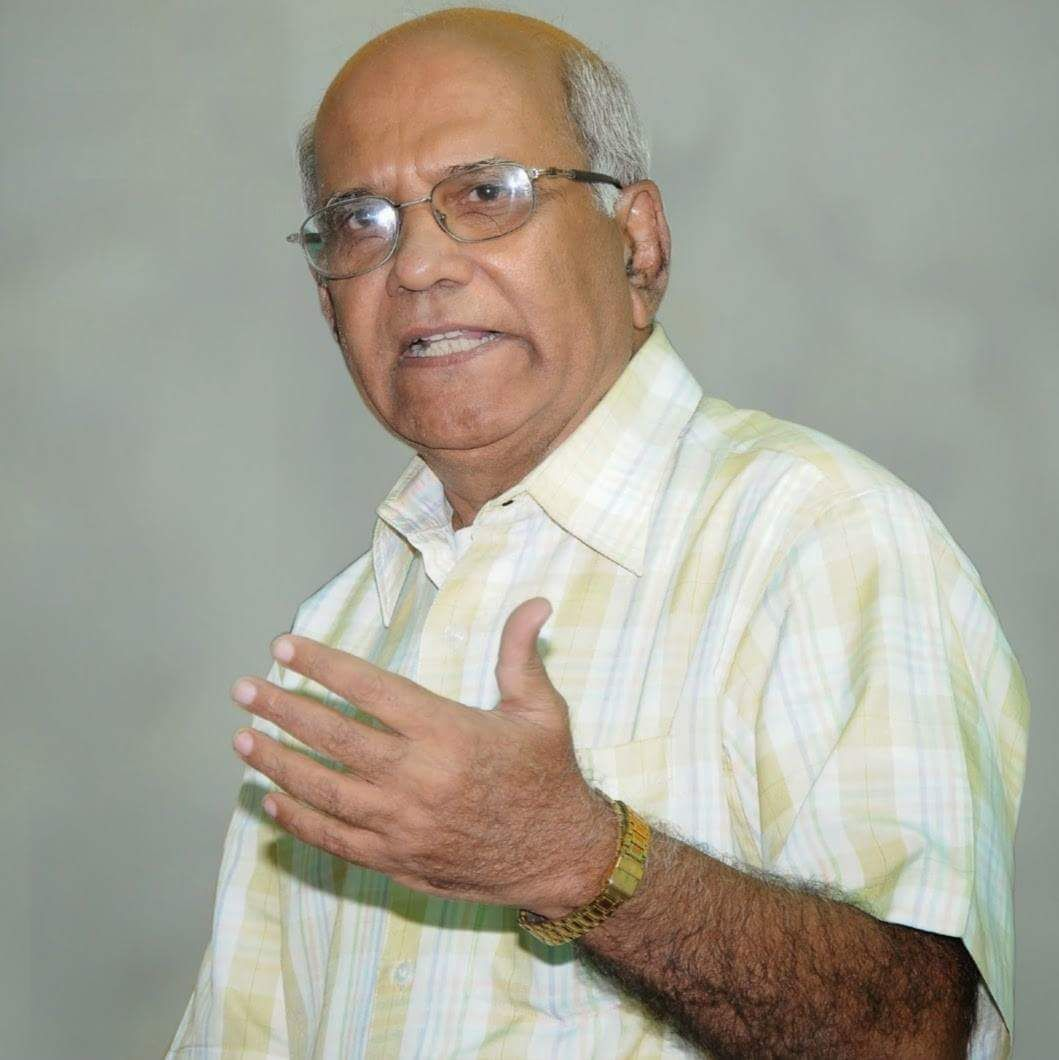
- Pandya in 2017
- Born: 14 September 1945 (age 80); Manavadar, Junagadh, British India
- Education: M.A. L.L.B.
- Known for: Journalist, writer, historian, columnist
- Spouse: Dr. Arti Pandya
- Awards: Padma Shri (2017)

Signature
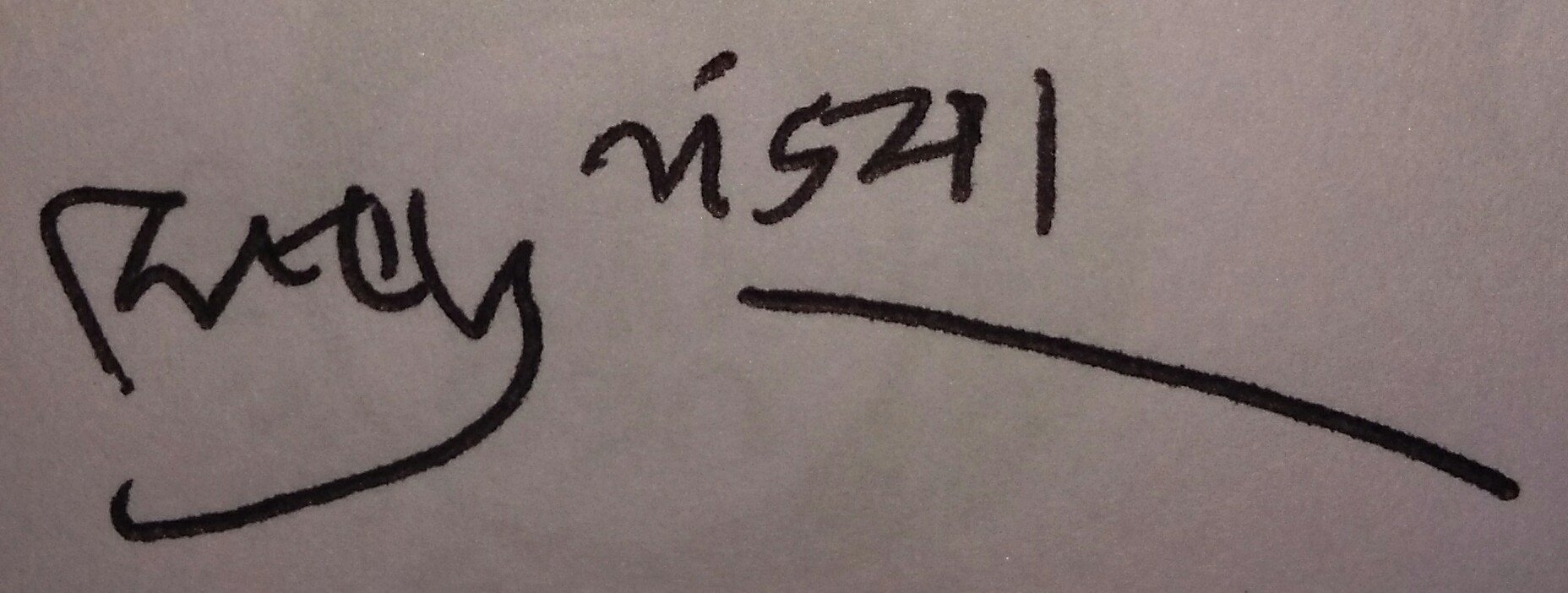

Vishnu Pandya is a journalist, biographer, poet, novelist, writer and political analyst from Gujarat, India. He has been the chairman of Gujarat Sahitya Akademi since 2017. Pandya writes articles on politics, history and historical places which are carried by several Gujarati newspapers and magazines, are among the most widely read columns in the State. He has been active in journalism for the last 40 years. Along with column writing in a Gujarati daily, he serves as General Secretary of Vishwa Gujarati Samaj.

== Early life ==
Pandya was born in Manavadar in Junagadh State (now in Junagadh district of Gujarat). He was educated at Bahauddin College, Junagadh. His father had worked in South Africa before his return to India after World War II. He was the District officer – Education in Manavadar.

He married Arti Pandya. She died on 24 January 2018.

== Career ==
Pandya started his career with Sadhana weekly, later became an editor of it at the age of 22. He was honored by the All Indian Newspapers Editor for protest on censorship during the Indian Emergency. He managed to publish the magazine and wrote against the censorship. He was appointed the chairman of the Gujarat Sahitya Akademi in May 2017.

Pandya as a Journalist :

- Sub Editor : Jansatta-Loksatta (Indian Express Group, Gujarat) 1981–1987
- Editor : Rangtarang-Chandni (Indian Express Group, Gujarat) 1981–1987
- Editor : Sadhana Magazine 1967–1980
- Editor : Samantar Magazine from 1987
- Editor : BIradar Patrika 1986–87
- Bureau chief : Nav Gujarat Times (Gujarati Daily Newspaper) 1994–1997
- Bureau chief : Dainik Mahanagar, Mumbai from 1996
- Columnist : Times of India (Gujarati Edition, 1992–93), Sandesh and Divyabhaskar

Pandya as a Lecturer

Pandya is teaching journalism in various colleges and universities of Gujarat at post graduate level, namely :

- Bhavan's College of Ahmedabad
- Bhavanagar University
- South Gujarat University
- Gujarat University
- Gujarat Vidhyapith
- Member of Board of Studies at M.S.University
- Gardi Vidhyapith
- National Institute of Mass Communication and Journalism

== Writing ==
His writing has various subjects from political criticism and analytic to history research. He has written many biographies. Apart from these writings he is actively contributing to journalism, having written many books on the field of journalism. To this date he has written 101 books.

== Books ==
Books on Journalism

- Patrakaratva no Itihas
- Patrakartvani Vikasrekha
- Patrakartvana Pravaho
- Kalamna Sipahi
- Patrakartva Dasha ane Disha
- Akhabarnu Sampadan
- PAtrakartva ane Kanun
- Chandarvo 1–2
- Sahitya Dainandini
- Gujaratnu Swatrantrottar Patrakartva (Fellowship from Dr. Chaturvedi University, Bhopal)

Criticism on Political Issues

- Bhaarelo Agni
- Seema Par Savdhan
- Sarhadni Salagti Samshyao
- Raktranjit Punjab
- Algavni Aandhi
- Rajkiya Zanzavati Varsho
- Gujaratni Chutani Shantranj 1952–2001
- Tasveer-e-Gujarat
- Samayna Hastakshar
- Swarnim Gujaratna Pachash Varsh
- Gandhiji ane Bharat Vibhajan

Biographies

- Rastrayagnana Rutvij
- Lala Hardayal
- Bhagvati Charan Varma
- M.N.Roy
- Jeevan Sadhakni Vimalyatra
- Syamji Krishnavarma
- Pandit Dindayal Upadhyay

History Research

- Londonma 'Indian Sociologist'
- Rang De Basanti Chola
- Gujaratna Sasatra Swatrantjangno Itihas
- Pandit Shyamji Krishnavarma
- Gujaratna Kranti Tirtho
- Jaihind! Jaihind!
- Ma, Tuje Pranam!
- Viplavma Gujarat
- Shahid katha
- Gujarat: 1857
- Sattavanthi Subhash

Essays

- Shahmrug ane Devnama
- Vasant ane Ihamrug
- Padchinhopar Pachhavalta
- Hathelinu Aakash

== Recognition ==
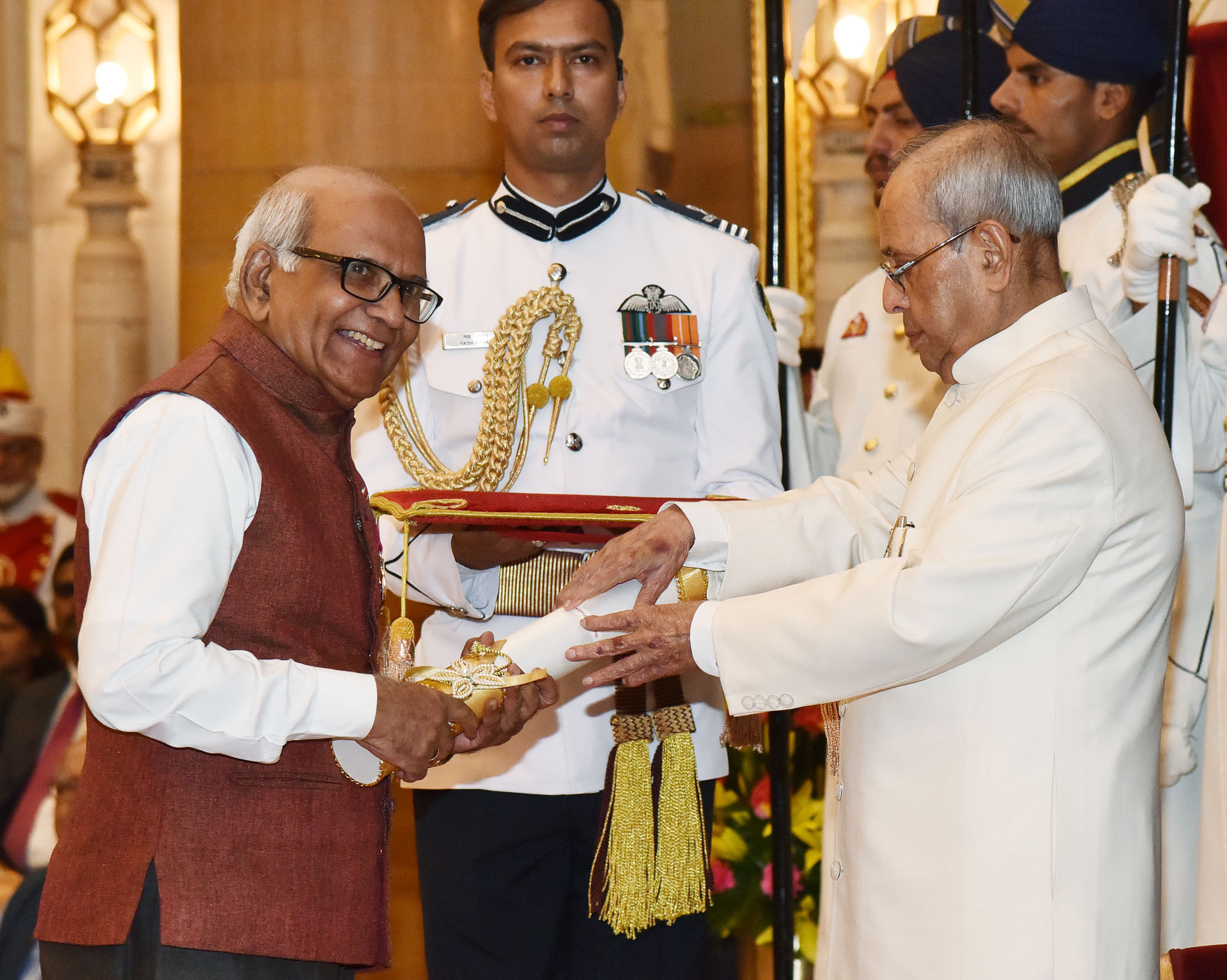
The President, Pranab Mukherjee presenting the Padma Shri Award to Vishnu Pandya, at a Civil Investiture Ceremony, at Rashtrapati Bhavan, in New Delhi on 30 March 2017

Pandya was imprisoned during Indian emergency of 1975–76. At that time his first book, Haheli nu Aakash (હથેળીનું આકાશ), was appreciated by the Gujarat Government and won a prize, but Pandya did not accept the prize. He received Narmad Suvarna Chandrak from Narmada Sahitya Sabha for historical writing in 1991. He was awarded Padma Shri in 2017 for literature and history. In 2019, he was awarded a D.Lit. by Gujarat University.
