= Gujarat Sahitya Akademi =

Gujrati language authority in India

- ગુજરાત સાહિત્ય અકાદમી
- logo of Akademi

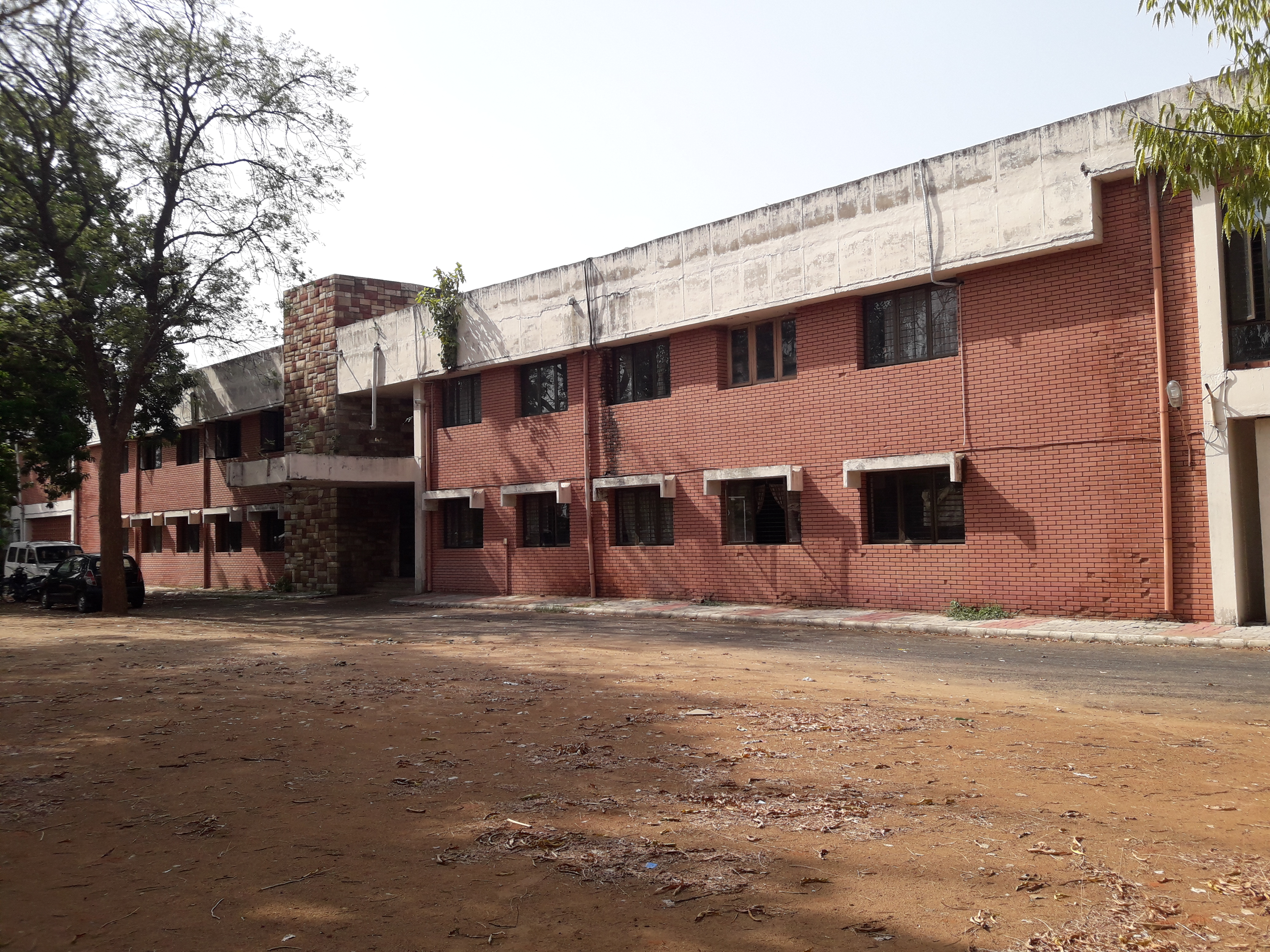
- Akademi headquarters in Gandhinagar
- Formation: 24 September 1981; 45 years ago
- Founder: Government of Gujarat
- Type: Literary institution
- Purpose: Literary and language development
- Headquarters: Jhaverchand Meghani Bhavan, Sector-10, Behind Krushi Bhavan, Gandhinagar, Gujarat, India
- Coordinates: 23.224431°N 72.654421°E
- Fields: Gujarati literature
- Chairman: Bhagyesh Jha
- Registrar: Jayendrasinh Jadav
- Main organ: Shabdasrishti
- Affiliations: Sports, Youth and Cultural Activities Department, Government of Gujarat
- Website: sahityaacademy.gujarat.gov.in

The Gujarat Sahitya Akademi (Gujarati: ગુજરાત સાહિત્ય અકાદમી) or Gujarat Sahitya Academy, established in 1981, is a government institution dedicated to the development of the languages spoken in Gujarat, India and their literature. Gujarati, an official language of Gujarat, is one of them; the others are Hindi, Sanskrit, Kutchi, Sindhi and Urdu. As of 2022, Bhagyesh Jha is the chairman of the Akademi.

== History ==
The Akademi was founded on 24 September 1981 by the Government of Gujarat. It was inaugurated on 17 June 1982 with the appointment of a chairman, a vice chairman and other members.

== Activity ==
The main aim of the Akademi is to:

- Encourage organizations and writers in Gujarat to promote the development of Gujarati, Sanskrit and other modern languages
- Promote the research of Gujarati folk literature
- Collect and publish books of literature
- Assemble and maintain a library
- Recognize and aid literary societies
- Publish criticism of various forms of literature
- Organize birthday celebrations for noted authors
- Award prizes for books published in different forms of literature
- Award financial scholarships to students of literature
- Financially assist elderly, physically handicapped, and indigent authors living in Gujarat.
- Annually award Sahitya Gaurav Puraskar to an established author and Yuva Gaurav Puraskar to a young writer.
- Since 2016, the Akademi has conferred the Sahityaratna Award to Gujarati authors for their significant contribution; and the Ramanlal Nilkanth Hasya Paritoshik which is conferred to Gujarati authors for their significant contribution in Gujarati humorous literature.

== Organisation ==
The Gujarat Academy oversees five other academies; namely the Hindi Sahitya Academy for Hindi, the Sanskrit Sahitya Academy for Sanskrit, the Kutchi Sahitya Academy for Kutchi, the Sindhi Sahitya Academy for Sindhi and the Urdu Sahitya Academy for Urdu. The registrar is the administrative head of all five academies. There are three standing committees, each of which has ten members, including five official members, for folk literature, Sanskrit language and literature, and other modern Indian languages.

The chairman, the vice chairman and the registrar have day-to-day control of the Akademi. The Akademi's overall controlling authorities are the general body and the executive council. The term of the general body is 5 years. The general body is made of 41 members including the education commissioner of Gujarat, the financial adviser of the education department, the registrar of Akademi, the higher education commissioner of Gujarat, the director of language of Gujarat, five members from the Gujarati literary community selected by the state government, 9 members selected by the committee appointed by representative of different Gujarati literary institutions, 8 members representing of the University of Gujarat, 3 members selected by the members of the general body of the Akademi, 9 members selected by a committee appointed by Gujarati writers, 2 members who have been awarded the Sahitya Gaurav Puraskar. The executive council is made up of a maximum of ten members including the chairman, the registrar and the vice-chairman of the Akademi, the education commissioner of Gujarat, the financial adviser of the education department, the education commissioner of Gujarat and five members of the general body selected by the state government.

=== List of chairmen ===
Following people served as chairmen:

No.	Chairman	From	To
1	Mohammad Mankad	17 June 1982	26 April 1984
2	Kulinchandra Yagnik	27 April 1984	27 December 1984
3	Bhupat Vadodaria	28 December 1984	13 March 1986
4	Ramanlal Joshi	14 March 1986	7 June 1987
5	Hasmukh Patel (Education Minister)	8 June 1987	10 December 1988
6	Arvind Sanghavi (Education Minister)	11 December 1988	12 December 1989
7	Hasmukh Patel (Education Minister)	13 December 1989	11 March 1990
8	Karsandas Soneri (Education Minister)	12 March 1990	11 August 1991
9	Manubhai Pancholi	12 August 1991	1998
10	Bholabhai Patel	5 October 1998	2003
11	Secretary; Sports, Youth and Cultural Activities Department (Ex-officio)	2003	6 May 2015
12	Bhagyesh Jha	7 May 2015	13 May 2017
13	Vishnu Pandya	13 May 2017	13 May 2022
14	Bhagyesh Jha	22 July 2022	

=== List of registrars ===
Following people served as registrars:

No	Registrar	From	To
1	Hasu Yajnik	25 February 1982	29 February 1996
2	Dankesh Oza	1 May 1997	16 March 1998
3	Dalpat Padhiyar	12 June 1998	9 May 2000
4	K. M. Pandya	10 May 2000	3 September 2003
5	V. V. Pandit	4 September 2003	3 September 2005
6	Kirit Doodhat	22 January 2008 (from other department)	?
7	Harshad Trivedi	5 December 2009	27 July 2014
8	Chetan Shukla	28 December 2014	17 August 2015
9	Manoj Oza	18 August 2015	30 September 2017
10	Ajaysinh Chauhan	7 December 2017	3 March 2020
11	Himmat Bhalodiya	1 July 2020	17 August 2021
12	Jayendrasinh Jadav	26 August 2021	Incumbent

== Controversy ==
The Akademi is an autonomous body empowered by its constitution to elect its chairman through a voting process by the 41 members of the general body.

The Akademi did not have a chairman from 2003 to 2015 as the government did not held an election. It was run by the registrar in-charge and the secretary of the sports, youth and cultural activities department; ex-offcio. In April 2015, the state government appointed Bhagyesh Jha, a Gujarati writer and retired IAS officer, as the new chairman of the Akademi without any election. This resulted in the Autonomous Academy Agitation (Swayatta Akademi Andolan) led by Gujarati Sahitya Parishad, the oldest literary institute in Gujarat and several Gujarati writers including Manishi Jani, Shirish Panchal, Dhiru Parikh, Chandrakant Topiwala, Bharat Mehta, Paresh Naik and Raju Solanki. Parishad boycotted the activities of the Akademi in protest. In March 2016, the Gujarati poet Harsh Brahmbhatt declined the award which had been conferred to him by the Akademi for his book. In November 2015, Bhagyesh Jha and two other writers Chinu Modi and Vinod Bhatt, said to be the supporter of Jha, used the word taliban for the writers like Dhiru Parikh and Niranjan Bhagat, who had supported the agitation. Pravin Pandya returned the award he had received in 2004 in protest. Another Gujarati writer and literary critic, Bharat Mehta, returned the award which he had received in 2008. Dhiru Parikh, along with other writers, submitted a public interest litigation to the Gujarat High Court. In January 2020, another writer Bipin Patel refused the award presented by Akademi for his story collection Vaans Na Ful citing the inaction by the government to restore autonomy of the Akademi.

== See also ==
- Gujarat Sahitya Sabha
- Gujarat Vidhya Sabha
