= Jayant Pathak =

Indian poet and literary critic (1920–2003)

- જયંત હિંમતલાલ પાઠક
- Born: Jayant Himmatlal Pathak; 20 October 1920; Goth village, Rajgadh, Panchmahal district, Gujarat, India
- Died: 1 September 2003 (aged 82); Nanpura, Surat, Gujarat, India
- Education: M. A., Ph. D.
- Alma mater: M.T.B Arts College, Surat
- Occupations: Poet, literary critic
- Writing career
- Language: Gujarati
- Period: Modern Gujarati literature
- Notable works: Vananchal (1967); Anunaya (1978); Mrugaya (1983)
- Notable awards: Kumar Suvarna Chandrak (1957); Narmad Suvarna Chandrak (1964); Ranjitram Suvarna Chandrak (1976); Sahitya Akademi Award (1980)

Jayant Himmatlal Pathak (20 October 1920 – 1 September 2003) was a Gujarati poet and literary critic from Gujarat, India. He was the president of the Gujarati Sahitya Parishad from 1990 – 1991. He received several awards, including the Sahitya Akademi Award, the Kumar Suvarna Chandrak, the Narmad Suvarna Chandrak, the Ranjitram Suvarna Chandrak and the Uma-Snehrashmi Prize. The Jayant Pathak Poetry Award is named after him.

== Early life ==
Pathak was born into a Gauda Brahmins family on 20 October 1920, at Goth, a village now in the Rajgadh taluka of Panchmahal district, Gujarat, India, to Ichchhaba and Himmatram Joitaram Pathak. "Bachudo" (Lit. Small Child) was his childhood nickname. Pathak was raised by his grandfather Joitaram, because his father Himmatram died when he was about ten years old. He completed his preschool education in Rajgadh. Then, he moved to Motabahen's (a.k.a. Pushpabahen) home in Kalol in 1930, and joined the N.G.S. High School in Kalol and completed matriculation there in 1938. He completed a Bachelor of Arts from M.T.B Arts College in 1943 and a Master of Arts in Gujarati and Sanskrit subjects from Vadodara college in 1945. He received a Ph.D. in 1960, under Vishnuprasad Trivedi, for his research thesis, 1920 Pachhini Gujarati Kavitani Sanskrutik Bhoomika: Paribalo Ane Siddhi. He married Bhanubahen.

== Career ==
From 1943 to 1945, he served as a teacher at different schools including the New Era School in Vadodara, the Katapitiya School, and a school at Karjan village. From 1948 to 1953, he lived in Mumbai, Pune, and Delhi, and worked in different fields, including journalism. He joined the MTB Arts College in Surat in 1953 as a professor and retired from there in 1980. He was appointed president of the Gujarati Sahitya Parishad from 1989 to 1991. He also served as the president of the Narmad Sahitya Sabha in 1992 and of the Kavi Narmad Yugavarta Trust in 1992. His literary works had been published in Gujaratmitra, Loksatta, Kumar, Buddhiprakash, Granth, Vishwa Manav, Kavita and Kavilok.

He died on 1 September 2003 at his home in Nanpura, Surat.

== Works ==
The ambiance of his birthplace, Panchamahal, a tribal forest region of Gujarat, strongly influenced his poetry. He was also acquainted with literary personalities and was influenced by them when he was young. This included first, his cousin Ushnas, who later became a renowned Gujarati poet, and his school teacher, Pranshankar Bhatt. He was also influenced by the Gujarati poets Umashankar Joshi and Sundaram.

Marmar, is his first collection of poems, published in 1954, followed by Sanket (1960), Vismay (1964), Sarga (1969), Antariksha (1975), Anunaya (1978), Mrugaya (1983), Shooli Upar Sej (1988), Be Akshar Anandna (1992), and Drutvilambit (2003). His poems are characterized by nostalgia for his lost childhood spent in his village, as he finds city life uneasy and unbearable. Anunaya, a collection of his poems was translated and published by Brajendra Tripathi in 1993.

His critical works are: Aadhunik Kavita Pravah (1963), Aalok (1966), Tunki Varta: Swaroop ane Sahitya (1968), Jhaverchand Meghani: Jivaan ane Sahitya (1968), Ramnarayan V. Pathak (1970), Kavyalok (1974), Arthat (1997), and Tunki Varta ane Bija Lekho (2000).

== Recognition ==
He received the Narmad Suvarna Chandrak (1964) for his book Vananchal, the Sahitya Akademi Award (1980) for Anunaya, the Uma-Snehrashmi Prize (1982 - 1983) for Mrugaya, and the Dhanji Kanji Gandhi Suvarna Chandrak for Shooli Upar Sej. He is also a recipient of the Kumar Suvarna Chandrak (1957) and the Ranjitram Suvarna Chandrak (1976). The Jayant Pathak Poetry Award is named after him. He shared the Premanand Suvarna Chandrak (2001) with Raghuveer Chaudhari.

== See also ==
- List of Gujarati-language writers
