= Saptak School of Music =

Music and performing arts school in India

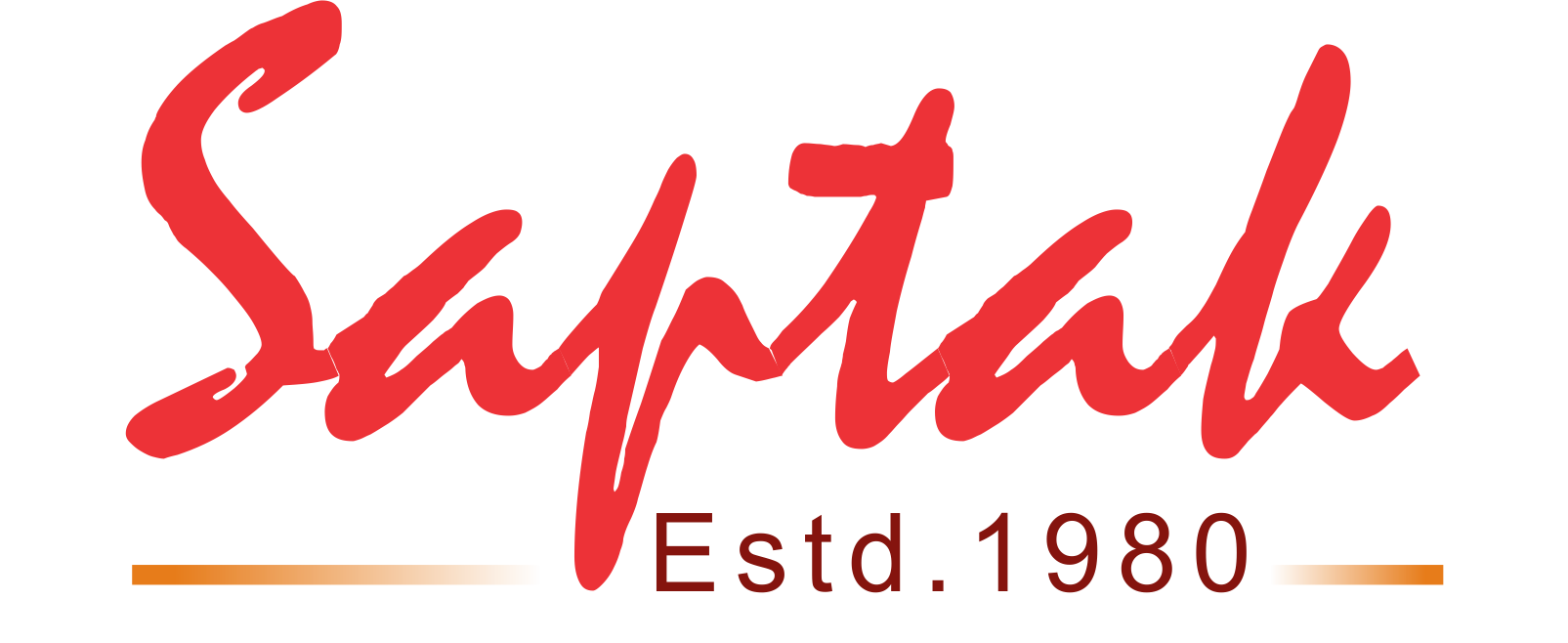
- Formation: 1980
- Founder: Nandan Mehta, Manju Mehta, Rupande Shah, Bharti Parikh, D.D. Trivedi
- Type: Public charitable trust, music education institution
- Registration no.: E.4054 (Ahmedabad)
- Legal status: Active
- Purpose: Promotion and education of Indian classical music
- Headquarters: Ahmedabad, Gujarat, India
- Region served: India
- Services: Music education, annual festivals, competitions, archives
- Fields: Indian classical music
- Key people: Hetal Mehta, Manju Mehta (co-founder, deceased)
- Subsidiaries: Saptak Archives
- Affiliations: Gujarat State Sangeet Natak Academy (for competitions)
- Website: www.saptak.org

The Saptak School of Music is a classical music and performing arts education institution in Ahmedabad, India. Nandan Mehta established this institution and started Saptak Annual Festival of Music in 1980.

== Saptak Festival ==
The flagship event of Saptak is the Annual Festival of Music, held from 1 to 13 January each year since 1980 at the L.D. Arts College Campus, opposite Indian Institute of Management Ahmedabad.

Now in its 46th edition as of 2026, the festival features over 150 artists in 43 sessions, including evening performances starting at 8:30 PM and Sunday morning sessions from 10:00 AM.

It showcases a blend of Hindustani and Carnatic music, with tributes to legends and opportunities for emerging talents, and considered as the world's longest Hindustani music festival.

The festival has been praised for its authenticity and has featured luminaries like Pandit Birju Maharaj, Pandit Hari Prasad Chaurasia, Pandit Jasraj, and the Gundecha Brothers.
