= Abhinavano Rasavichar =

1969 book by Nagindas Parekh

- cover page
- Author: Nagindas Parekh
- Original title: અભિનવનો રસવિચાર
- Language: Gujarati
- Subject: Indian poetics
- Genre: critical essay
- Publication date: 1969
- Publication place: India
- Awards: Sahitya Akademi Award (1970)
- OCLC: 26778342

Abhinavano Rasavichar (Gujarati pronunciation: [əbʰinəvno rəsəvicar]; English: Rasa theory of Abhinavagupta) is a 1969 Gujarati language collection of critical essays by Indian writer Nagindas Parekh that deals with the theory of Indian poetics. The work won the Sahitya Akademi Award in 1970.

== Background ==
The book was published in 1969 and was awarded the Sahitya Akademi Award in 1970.

== Contents ==
In Abhinavano Rasavichar, the author has examined the theory of Indian poetics. The work has eight essays.

The title essay explains Abhinavagupta's view on Rasa as expressed in his commentary on Bharata's Natya Shastra. The other articles discuss Vakrokti theory of Kuntaka, Ramaniyata theory of Jagannath. It discusses in details about Śṛṅgāraḥ (erotic), Hāsya (humour) and Shānta (sublime) sentiments, Auchitya (propriety) and Rasabhas (illusory experience of pleasure). The author has also discussed the poetic form of akhyana, showing how Akhyana was a figure of speech, and it was falsely interpreted as a form of poetry.

== Reception ==
Abhinavano Rasavichar is a contribution to Gujarati literature noted for its erudition, judgement, and prose.
