= Bhogilal Sandesara =

Indian literary critic, scholar and editor (1917-1955)

- ભોગીલાલ જયચંદભાઈ સાંડેસરા
- Born: Bhogilal Jayachandbhai Sandesara; 13 April 1917; Sander near Patan, British India
- Died: 18 January 1995 (aged 77); New Jersey, US
- Education: MA, PhD
- Alma mater: Gujarat College, Gujarat Vidhya Sabha
- Occupations: Writer, historian, scholar
- Writing career
- Language: Gujarati
- Notable awards: Ranjitram Suvarna Chandrak (1953); Narmad Suvarna Chandrak (1962)

Academic background
- Thesis: Literary Circle of Mahamatya Vastupala and Its Contribution to Sanskrit Literature (1950)
- Doctoral advisor: Rasiklal Parikh

Academic work
- Doctoral students: Suresh Joshi

Bhogilal Jayachandbhai Sandesara (13 April 1917 – 18 January 1995) was a literary critic, scholar and editor from Gujarat, India. He was a scholar of Sanskrit, Prakrit, Apabhramsha and Old Gujarati language. He also contributed to the field of historical and cultural research. He has edited large number of historical works. He was appointed the president of Gujarati Sahitya Parishad in 1987.

== Early life ==
Bhogilal Sandesara was born on 13 April 1917 in Sander village near Patan (now in Gujarat, India) in a Vaishnava family of Jayachandbhai Ishwardas Sandesara and his wife Mahalaxmiben. He started his school education in Ahmedabad. Following death of his father when he was eight, his family moved to Patan where he completed his school education. He came in contact with Muni Jinvijayji in 1931 who introduced him to Muni Punyavijayji under whom he studied and used the preserved works in the ancient libraries of Patan. He was also guided by his high school teacher and researcher Ramlal Chunilal Modi.

After matriculation in 1935, he worked on the editorial teams of Gujarati periodicals Gujarat Samachar and Prajabandhu from 1935 to 1937. He received his Bachelor of Arts in 1941 with first class from Gujarat College and Master of Arts in 1943 from Gujarat Vidhya Sabha with Gujarati and Sanskrit subjects. He had received the gold medal in MA.

== Career ==
Sandesara worked at the Sheth Bholabhai Jeshingbhai Institute of Learning and Research in Ahmedabad as a lecturer and researcher of Ardha-Magadhi language from 1943 to 1950. He received a PhD in 1950 for his research work Literary Circle Of Mahāmātya Vastupāla And Its Contribution To Sanskrit Literature. In 1951, he joined the Maharaja Sayajirao University of Baroda as a professor of Gujarati and retired as the head of the department Gujarati on 5 April 1975. He was also the director of Oriental Research Institute (known as Prachya Vidya Mandir) from 1958 to 1975. During this period, he worked as an editor of Swadhyaya, a quarterly journal of the institute.

He also served as an editor of Gujarati monthly Buddhiprakash. He was appointed the president of History and Archeology at the 59th convention of Gujarati Sahitya Parishad (Gujarati Literary Council) held at Nadiad in 1955. He also served as the president of Prakrit languages and Jain religion department in Akhil Bharat Prachyavidya Parishad held at Bhuwaneshwar in 1959. He also served as the president of Gujarat Itihas Parishad in 1962–1964. In 1987, he was elected as the president of Gujarati Sahitya Paridhad.

He died on 18 January 1995 in New Jersey, US.

== Works ==
Sandesara made several contributions to the fields of Indian archaeology, Indian culture, Gujarat history and culture, and medieval Indian literature. He was a scholar of several languages including Sanskrit, Prakrit, Ardha-Magadhi and Old Gujarati. He was also a scholar of Jain religion, and studied the art and sculpture of India. He also edited a few unpublished manuscripts of medieval Gujarati literature.

He published numerous historical and cultural research works. Vaghelaonu Gujarat (1939) is a study of the socio-political and cultural life of Gujarat during the reign of Vaghela kings while Literary Circle Of Mahāmātya Vastupāla And Its Contribution To Sanskrit Literature (translated as Mahamatya Vastupalnu Sahityamandal tatha Sanskrit Sahitya Teno Falo in Gujarati in 1957) is an account of the court of Vastupala, the medieval minister of the king of Gujarat, who was a connoisseur of art. Jyesthimall Jnati ane Malla Puran (1948) is a Jain manuscript published with notes. Jagannathpuri ane Orissana Puratan Avashesho (1951) is a work on the old archaeological remains in Jagannath Puri and Orissa. Jain Agam Sahityama Gujarat (1952) is a research on references to Gujarat in Jain religious literature. His other historical research work includes Itihasni Kedi (1945).

Among his works on medieval Gujarati literature are Uttaradhyayana Sutra, an edition of medieval Jain manuscript with notes and comments, and Prachin Gujarati Sahityama Vritta Rachna (1941), a research work on the metres used in old and medieval Gujarati poetry. His Shabda Ane Arth (1954) is a work on historical semantics, probably the first such work in Gujarati. His other works include Dayaram (1960), Sanshodhanni Kedi (1961), Itihas Ane Sahitya (1966), Anveshana (1967), Anusmriti (1973) as well as a biography Muni Jinvijaji: Jeevan Ane Karya (1978).

He traveled across the United States on the invitation of the Rockefeller Foundation in New York, and followed this with visits to Japan and Southeastern Asia. Sandesara serialized this tour as Ek Vidyayatra in Buddhiprakash, giving insights into the history and cultures of the regions. The series was later republished in a single volume as Pradakshina (1962).

He has edited large number of historical works including Sanghvijay's Simhasanbatrisi (1933), Madhava's Roopsundarkatha (1934), Veersinh's Ushaharan, Matisar Karpurmanjari (1941), Mahiraj's Naladamayantiras (1954), Prachin Fagu Sangrah (1955), Varnasamuchchaya Volume I-II (1956-1959), Someshwardeva's Ullas-Raghav Natakam (1961), Yashodhir's Panchakhyan Balavabodh volume I (1963), Mallapuran (1964), Someshwardeva's Ramshatakam (1965), Gangadhar's Gangadaspratapvilas Natakam (1973) and Amritkalasha's Hammirprabandh (1973). Sattarma Satak na Prachin Gujarjarkavyo (1948) is a compilation of some previously unknown Gujarati poems of the seventeenth century. He has translated Sanghdasgani's Vasudevhindi (1946) from Prakrit which is widely studied in Indian narratology. He has also translated Panchatantra in Gujarati along with its comparative study of various manuscripts.

== Recognition ==
Sandesara received the Gujarati literary awards; Ranjitram Suvarna Chandrak in 1953 and Narmad Suvarna Chandrak in 1962.
