= Ramlal Chunilal Modi =

Indian writer, researcher, critic and historian (1890–1949)

Ramanlal Chunilal Modi
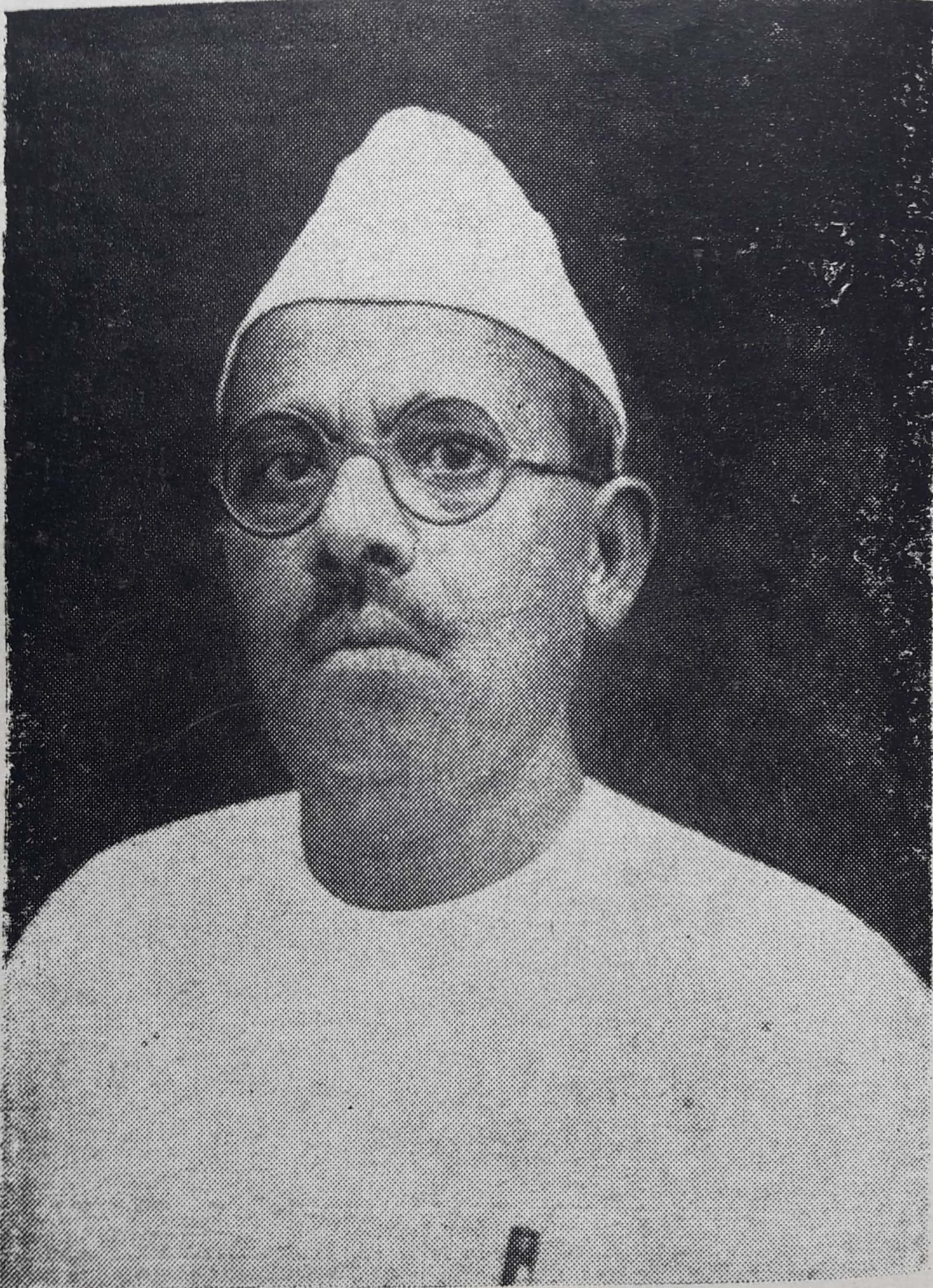
- Born: 27 July 1890; Patan, Gujarat, India
- Died: 14 July 1949 (aged 58); Rajkot, Gujarat
- Occupations: Author, researcher, critic and historian
- Writing career
- Language: Gujarati
- Notable awards: Narmad Suvarna Chandrak (1945–50)

Ramlal Chunilal Modi (27 July 1890 – 14 July 1949) was an Indian Gujarati-language writer, researcher, critic and historian. He is known for his research in medieval Gujarati literature, especially on the medieval poet Bhalan. He was awarded the Narmad Suvarna Chandrak posthumously in 1950.

== Biography ==
Ramlal Chunilal Modi was born on 27 July 1890 in the Dasa Vayada Vanik family at Patan. His father's name was Chunilal Narbheram and his mother's name was Jadav. After clearing his matriculation examination from Patan High School in 1908, he worked as the headmaster of Unjha and Chanasma middle schools. He then joined Patan High School as a teacher and served there till his death.

He died on 14 July 1949 at Rajkot.

== Works ==
Since Ramlal Chunilal Modi was a native of Patan, he had a special charm for the local librarians and poets there. He has done important work mainly in the field of Old Gujarati and medieval history of Gujarat. He has published as many as 150 exploratory articles in addition to some texts.

In 1909, his first article titled 'Gujarati Shabdkosh' published in the 'Buddhiprakash'. In 1919, he published the classically written character book 'Bhalan' about the medieval Gujarati poet Bhalan. In 1924, he published the book 'Kavi Bhalan krut Be Nalakhyan', for which he was awarded Rs. 101 by the Gujarati Sahitya Parishad.

He has made a Gujarati translation of the Jadunath Sarkar's Mughal Administration (1920) book under the title 'Mughal Rajyavahivat' (1942). 'Patan-Sidhpurno Pravas' (1919) is his travelogue. 'Karna Solanki' (1935) and 'Vayupurana' (1945) are his historical texts.

== Awards and honors ==
During 1945–50, he was posthumously awarded the Narmad Suvarna Chandrak by the Narmad Sahitya Sabha for his historiography.

== See also ==
- List of Gujarati-language writers
