= Trun No Grah =

Collection of poems written in Gujarati-language by Natwarlal Kuberdas Pandya (1964)

Trun No Grah તૃણનો ગ્રહ
- Cover
- Author: Ushnas
- Language: Gujarati
- Genre: Collection of poems
- Set in: Surat
- Published: October 1964
- Publisher: Harihar Pustakalay, Jayantilal Vitthaldas Mehta
- Publication place: India
- Media type: Print
- Pages: 132
- Awards: Narmad Suvarna Chandrak (1963)
- OCLC: 30877851
- Dewey Decimal: 891.471
- LC Class: PK1859.C285
- Preceded by: Aardra

Trun No Grah (Gujarati: તૃણનો ગ્રહ) is a collection of poems written in Gujarati by Natwarlal Kuberdas Pandya, better known by his pen name 'Ushnas.' The book received the Narmad Suvarna Chandrak in 1963. It is considered one of the finest works of poetry in Gujarati literature.

== Origin ==
The poems in Trun No Grah, written by Ushnas between 1959 and 1963, were published during this period in several literary magazines, such as Sanskruti, Kumar, Kshitij, Vishwa Manav, Kavilok, Samarpan, Manjari, Akhandanand, Ruchi, and Milan.

Trun No Grah was published in October 1964 by Harihar Pustakalay, Surat.

== Content ==
Ushnas composed poems in a variety of formats, including haiku, geet, ghazal, sonnets, free verse, with most composed in Sanskrit meters such as Shikharini.

== Awards ==
- 1963: Narmad Suvarna Chandrak
