= Dhirubhai Thakar Savyasachi Saraswat Award =

Civilian award in Gujarat, India

- Civilian award for contributions to Arts
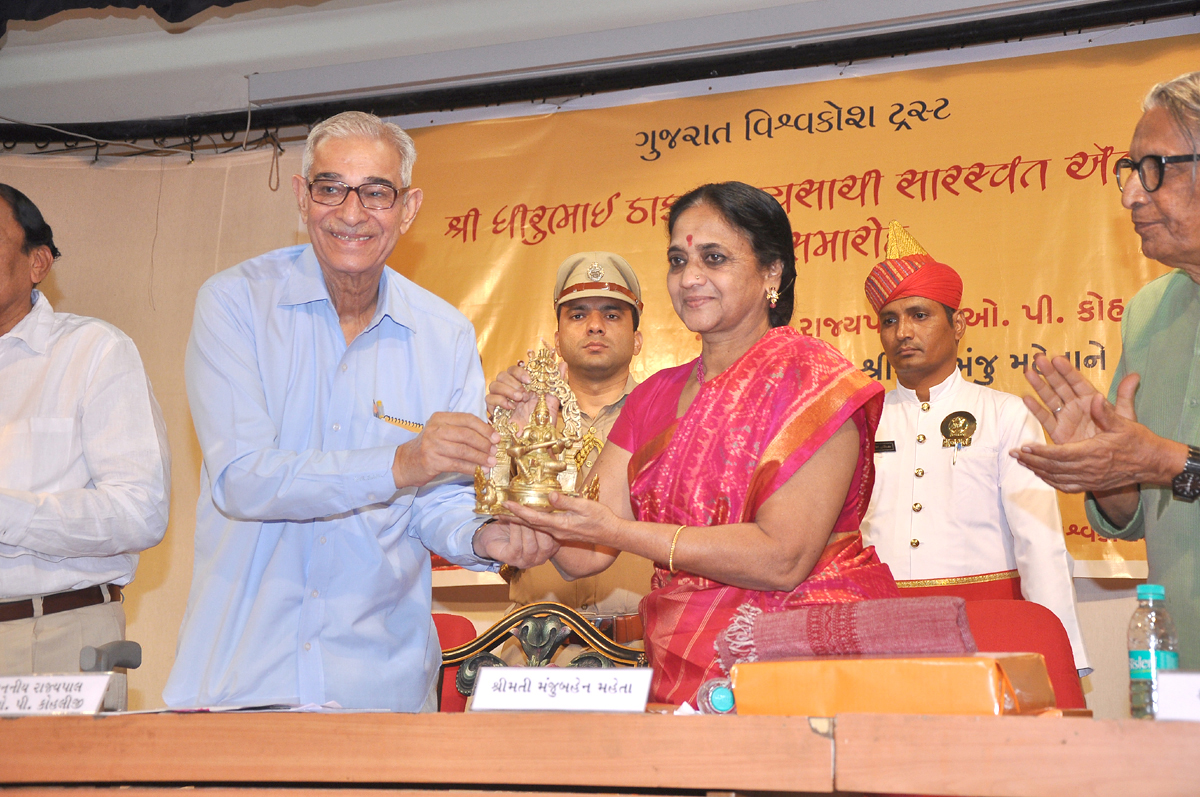
- Manju Mehta receiving award from Om Prakash Kohli; 27 June 2016
- Awarded for: honour in Arts
- Location: Ahmedabad, Gujarat
- Country: India
- Presented by: Gujarat Vishwakosh Trust
- Reward: ₹ 1,00,000 (1 lakh)
- First award: 2013
- Final award: 2022

Highlights
- Total awarded: 10
- First winner: Narayan Desai
- Last winner: Sarita Joshi

The Dhirubhai Thakar Savyasachi Saraswat Award is an honour in Gujarat, India, given annually to the person who has contributed significantly in the field of Arts. The award, created in honour of Gujarati writer and scholar Dhirubhai Thaker, is conferred by Gujarat Vishwakosh Trust since 2013. The award comprises a cash prize of ₹ 1,00,000 (one lakh), shawl, an idol of Saraswati and a citation.

== Recipients ==
Following is the list of recipients.

Year	Recipients	Field	Ref.
2013	Narayan Desai	Literature	
2014	Mrinalini Sarabhai	Dance	
2015	K. G. Subramanyan	Painting	
2016	Manju Mehta	Music	
2017	B. V. Doshi	Architecture	
2018	Bharat Dave	Drama	
2019	Niranjan Rajyaguru	Folk-literature	
2020	Jyoti Bhatt	Painting	
2021	Kumudini Lakhia	Dance	
2022	Sarita Joshi	Theatre	
