= Swami Sachchidanand =

Indian religious ascetic and writer (born 1932)

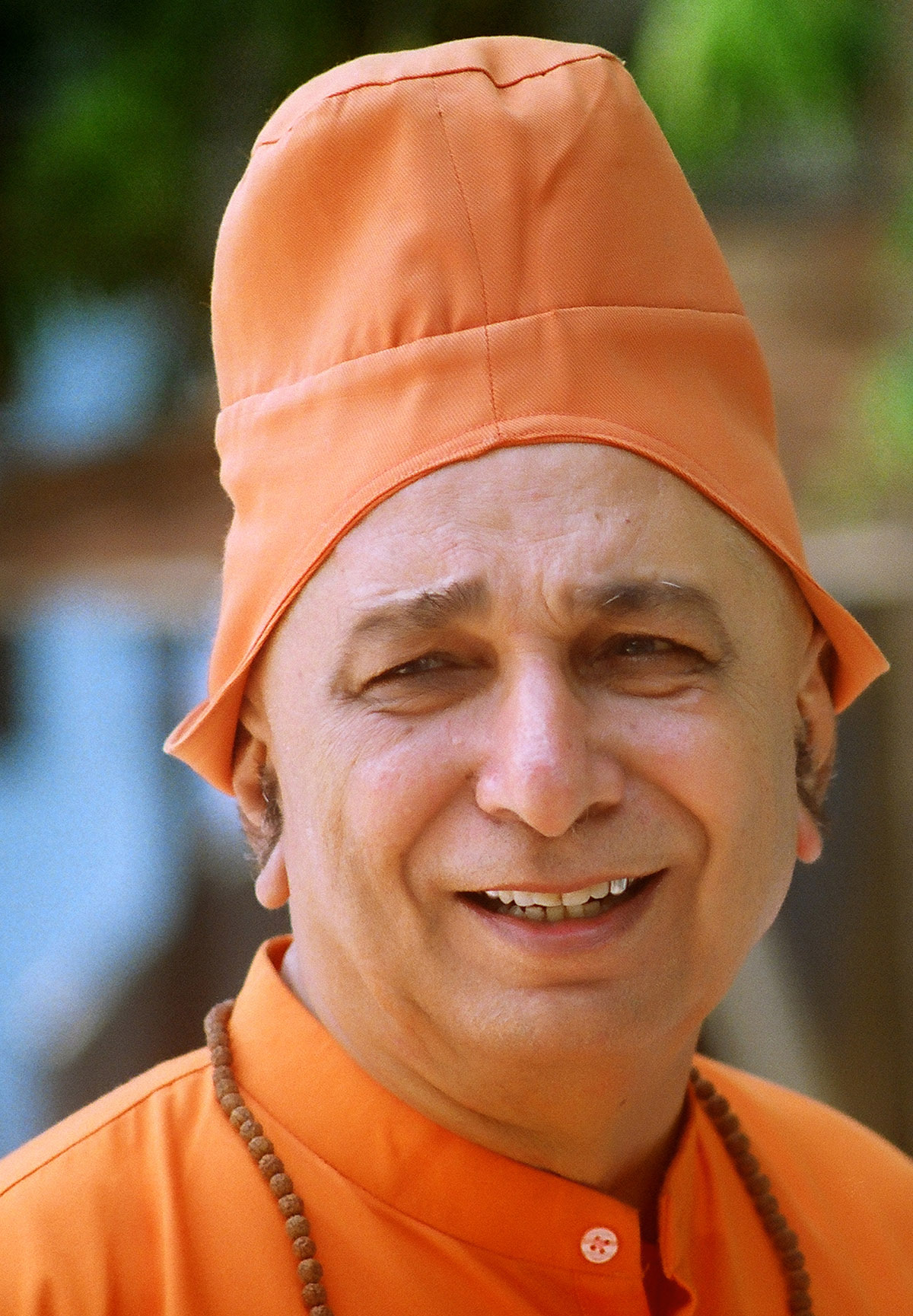
- Swami Sachchidanand at Dantali Ashram, Nadiad, 2006
- Born: Nanalal Motilal Trivedi; April 22, 1932 (age 94) Moti Chandur, Gujarat, India
- Occupation: Writer
- Language: Gujarati
- Notable awards: Narmad Suvarna Chandrak (1984); Padma Bhushan (2022)

Website
- sachchidanandjiblog.org

Swami Sachchidanand (22 April 1932), born as Nanalal Motilal Trivedi, is an Indian social reformer, philosopher, welfare activist, humanitarian, religious ascetic and writer from Gujarat, India. He was awarded the Narmad Suvarna Chandrak in 1984 and the Padma Bhushan, India's third highest civilian award, in 2022 by the Indian Government in the field of Literature and Education.

== Life ==
Swami Sachchidanand was born on 22 April 1932 in Moti Chandur village in Patan district of Gujarat, India. At the age of 21, he left home and after travelling all over India, in 1956, he took the initiation of sanyasa to Swami Muktanandji 'Paramahansa' in Firozpur town of Punjab, India. His purvashram name was Nanalal Motilal Trivedi. In 1966, he received the degree of Vedantacharya from Varanasi Sanskrit University. In 1969, he established Sri Bhakti Niketan Ashram located in Dantali village in Anand district of Gujarat, India.

== Writing ==
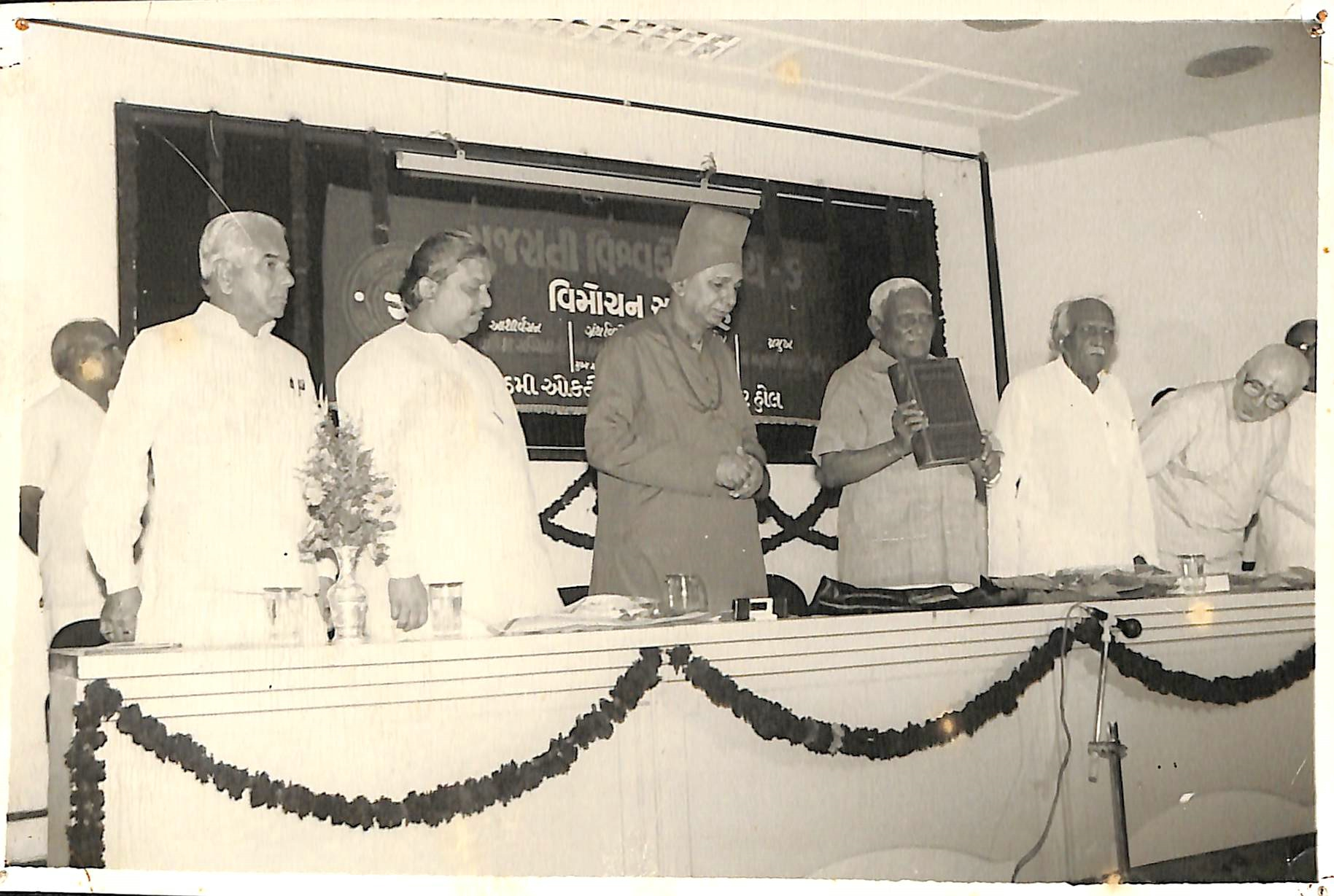
On the occasion of the release of the sixth volume of the Gujarati Vishwakosh, Bholabhai Patel, Narhari Amin, Swami Sachchidananda, Manubhai Pancholi 'Darshak', Shrenik Kasturbhai Lalbhai; 8 October 1994

Mara Anubhavo (1985) and Videshyatrana prerak prasango (1985) are his biographical volumes. Bhartiya Darshano (1979), Sansar Ramayana (1984), Vedanta Samiksha (1987), Shrikrishnalila Rahasya, Mahabharat Sar, etc., are his spiritual and cultural texts. Pruthvi-Pradakhsina, Chin Mari Najre, Egypt-Israel, Afrika Pravasna Sansmarano, Shrilankani Safare, Purvama Navu Pashchim etc., are his travelogue. He wrote more than 100 books. Bhartiya Yuddhono Sankhshipt Itihas and Bharatma Angrejona Yuddho are his history based books. Chalo, Abhigam Badalie, Nava Vicharo, Aapane ane Pashchim, Rashtrana Salagata Prashno are collection of his essays on various subject. Many of his books are translated in Hindi and English.

== Awards ==
Swami Sachchidanand has received Narmad Suvarna Chandrak (1984) for his autobiographical work Mara Anubhavo. The Government of India honored him with the third-highest civilian award of Padma Bhushan in 2022 for his distinguished contribution in the field of Literature and Education.

== See also ==
- List of Gujarati-language writers
