= Bharat Dave =

Indian theatre director, dramatist and TV producer

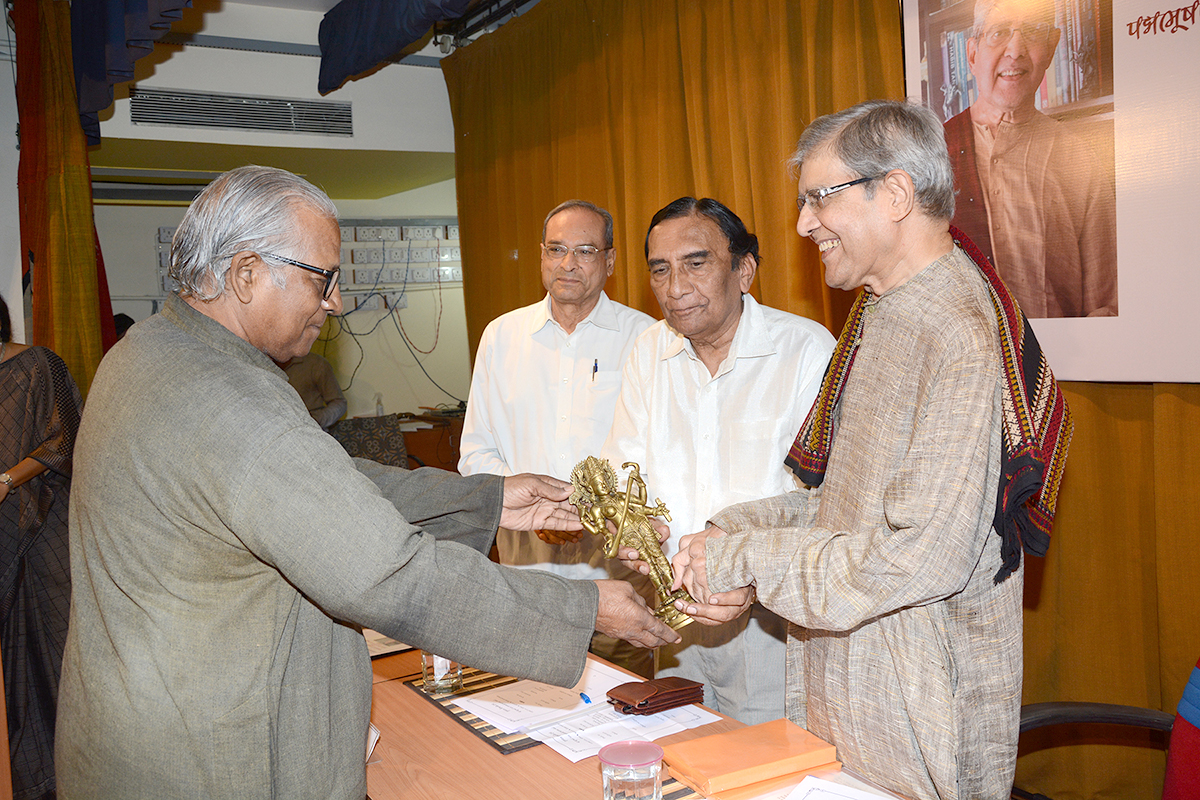
- Dave accepting Dhirubhai Thakar Savyasachi Saraswat Award, Gujarat Vishwakosh Trust, July 2018
- Born: Bharat Balkrishna Dave; 16 August 1948; Ahmedabad, Bombay State, India
- Died: 15 May 2021 (aged 72); Ahmedabad, Gujarat, India
- Occupations: Director; Dramatist; Television producer
- Writing career
- Notable awards: Gaurav Puraskar (1991); Kumar Suvarna Chandrak (2016); Narmad Suvarna Chandrak (2016); Dhirubhai Thakar Savyasachi Saraswat Award (2018)

Bharat Balkrishna Dave (16 August 1948 – 15 May 2021) was an Indian drama director, dramatist and television producer from Gujarat, India. He was honored with the Gaurav Puraskar (1991) by Gujarat Government, the Kumar Suvarna Chandrak (2016) and the Narmad Suvarna Chandrak (2016).

== Biography ==
Dave was born on 16 August 1948 in Ahmedabad. He completed his M.A. from Gujarat University in 1971 and LLB studies in 1972. Due to his interest in drama, he completed a one-year diploma in the Natya Sangh of Bombay in 1973 and then a three-year diploma in direction from Alkazi Saheb at the National School of Drama, Delhi in 1976. He had learnt the sitar and also used to do painting. He returned to Ahmedabad and joined the Darpana Academy of Performing Arts established by Mrinalini Sarabhai. In 1977, he became a television program producer at the Indian Space Research Organisation (ISRO) office in Ahmedabad. Under Fulbright Scholarship, he received six months of training for communication technology in television production at Syracuse University in New York.

In 1978, Dave founded a theatre group, Saptasindhu and staged more than 20 works by regional, national and international writers. In 1980, he directed Rasiklal Parikh's play Mena Gurjari (Mena of Gujarat) for the National School of Drama. In 1985, his play Muktadhara was selected at the National Drama Festival organized by the Sangeet Natak Akademi. He directed the play Manvini Bhavai, staged at the Jnanpith Award ceremony in 1987. The memories of his theatrical activities have been published as Rangyatra.

He died on 15 May 2021 following COVID-19.

== Recognition ==
In 1991, Dave received 'Critics Sandhan Award' and honored with the Gaurav Puraskar by Gujarat Government. In 2016, He was awarded Kumar Suvarna Chandrak and won the Narmad Suvarna Chandrak (2016) for his book Vastavvadi Natak. He won the Dhirubhai Thakar Savyasachi Saraswat Award (2018) for his significant contribution in the field of drama.
