= Ashwattha =

Collection of poems written by Natwarlal Kuberdas Pandya (1975)

Ashwattha અશ્વત્થ
- Coverpage
- Author: Ushnas
- Language: Gujarati
- Genre: Collection of poems
- Set in: Ahmedabad
- Published: 1975
- Publisher: Vora & Company
- Publication place: India
- Media type: Print
- Pages: 135
- Awards: Sahitya Akademi Award (1976)
- Dewey Decimal: 891.471
- Preceded by: Spanda Ane Chhand

Ashwattha (Gujarati: અશ્વત્થ) is a collection of poems written by Natwarlal Kuberdas Pandya, also known as Ushnas, in Gujarati. The book won the Sahitya Akademi Award for Gujarati in 1976. It is considered Ushnas's finest work in Gujarati.

== History ==
Ushnas wrote the poems between 1966 and 1973. They were published in various Gujarati literary magazines including Kumar and Samarpan. The book was first published in 1975 by Vora & Company, in Ahmedabad.

== Content ==
The book consists of 128 poems composed in different forms, including sonnets, geets, free verse, haiku, ghazals and muktak.

== Awards ==
The book won the Sahitya Akademi Award (1976) for Gujarati language.
