= Vadilal Dagli =

Economist

- Born: Vadilal Dagli; 20 November 1926; Rojid, Dhandhuka, Gujarat
- Died: 6 December 1985 (aged 59); Mumbai
- Education: University of California Berkeley (M.A.)
- Occupations: Economist, poet, essayist, journalist
- Spouse: Indira
- Children: Siddharth Dagli, Rekha, Meera
- Writing career
- Language: Gujarati
- Notable work: Shiyalani Savarno Tadako (1975)
- Notable awards: Narmad Suvarna Chandrak (1975)

Vadilal Jechand Dagli (1926–1985) was an economist, poet, essayist, and journalist of India.

== Life ==
Vadilal Dagli India was born on 20 November 1926 in Rojid village near Dhandhuka to Jechandbhai and Champaben Dagli. He completed his primary education from Veraval and secondary education from Sheth Chimanlal Nagindas Vidyalaya, Ahmedabad. He matriculated in 1944.

Dagli's contributions to India's society and economy were resurrected in a book published in his centenary year - 2025-26. What They Don't Teach You In Journalism Schools - PTI's Great Stories Behind News, & Unsung Heroes. ISBN – 9789334131024

== Freedom movement ==
During the Quit India Movement of 1942, Dagli — then aged fifteen or sixteen and studying in Ahmedabad — joined the underground student resistance against British rule.

In 1948, he completed a BA degree and went to US for further studies. He studied international politics and business at the University of California Berkeley and earned an MA degree. He returned to India in 1951 and joined Press Trust of India. Later he served as the financial editor of The Indian Express. He was appointed the Chief Officer develoments of Mumbai Head Office of State Bank of India in 1963. He became an editor of the economic weekly, Commerce in 1967 and he was considered as the prominent economist in the country.

== Historical legacy ==
Sameer C. Mohindru's book on the Press Trust of India has drawn a very interesting parallel between Vadilal Dagli and Deng Xiaoping, the Chinese leader who launched his landmark economic opening-up reforms in China beginning in late 1978 — almost exactly when Dagli was submitting his Committee on Controls and Subsidies report in India. The parallel made in the book is that Dagli sought to engineer an early, decisive break from socialist controls a full decade before the 1991 Balance of Payments crisis finally forced the nation's hand.

Former Prime Minister Manmohan Singh explicitly acknowledged Dagli's contribution at the Business Standard Awards:

There were several others who played

a very important role in shaping our thinking on economic policies. They were people like the late Shri Vadilal Dagli, who produced learned reports on the need to end the regime of controls and subsidies that were holding

back India.

— Manmohan Singh, Business Standard Awards

This tribute from the architect of India's 1991 reforms confirms Dagli's status as one of the foundational intellectual voices of India's economic liberalisation — a visionary who was decades ahead of his time.

== Chairman-Committee on Controls and Subsidies ==
In 1978, during Morarji Desai's tenure as Prime Minister of India, Finance Minister H.M.Patel appointed Economist Dagli to chair the Committee on Controls and Subsidies of the Government of India (1978–79). The committee submitted its landmark report in May 1979 * Report of the Committee on Controls and Subsidies (1979) — chaired by Vadilal Dagli. Report of the Committee on Controls and Subsidies (1979) — Ministry of Finance, Government of India. Archived at Internet Archive. and is regarded by economic historians as one of the earliest official admissions that India's regulatory framework had become dysfunctional. The report's core findings were: that the Licence Raj had ceased to serve national planning goals and instead protected established monopolies; that subsidies on food and fertilisers were poorly targeted and not reaching the rural poor; and that the government should transition from physical output quotas to fiscal and financial instruments such as taxes, duties, and interest rates. The report also recommended the dissolution of the Controller of Capital Issues (CCI), arguing it had failed to regulate financial markets and prevent fraud. This recommendation was a conceptual precursor to the establishment of the Securities and Exchange Board of India (SEBI) in 1988. The report was shelved following the collapse of the Janata Party government in late 1979. However when India faced a severe Balance of Payments crisis in 1991, Manmohan Singh as Finance Minister drew on the Dagli Committee's findings as part of the intellectual foundation for India's historic economic liberalisation. The abolition of industrial licensing and rationalisation of subsidies enacted in 1991 directly reflected recommendations Dagli had made twelve years earlier. When India hit a severe economic crisis in 1991 — the country was nearly bankrupt and could barely pay for its imports — the newly appointed Finance Minister Dr. Manmohan Singh reached for the ideas that economists had long known were correct. The Dagli Committee Report was among the foundational blueprints he and his team used. Dr. [[Manmohan Singh and the Planning Commission have explicitly acknowledged that the sweeping reforms of 1991 were not invented overnight. The Dagli Committee, alongside a handful of other reports, had already done the intellectual work — diagnosing the disease, naming the causes, and prescribing the cure. In 1991, Singh finally had the political mandate to act on it.]] when India faced a severe Balance of Payments crisis in 1991, Manmohan Singh as Finance Minister drew on the Dagli Committee's findings as part of the intellectual foundation for India's historic 1991 Indian economic liberalisation. The abolition of industrial licensing, dismantling of MRTP asset limits, and rationalisation of subsidies enacted in 1991 directly reflected recommendations Dagli had made twelve years earlier.

== Works ==
He was renowned essayist.

=== Essays ===
- Shiyalani Savarno Tadako...
- Ranknu Aayojan...
- Kavita Bhani...
- Thoda Nokha Jeev...

=== Poetry and Fiction ===
- Sahaj...
- Suna Sukan...

=== English Language Edited Volumes ===
- Two Decades of Indo-U.S. Relations...

=== Parichay Trust ===
"He founded the Parichay Trust in Mumbai and served as its Managing Trustee. The Trust's mission was the democratisation of knowledge: publishing short, affordable, expert-written booklets — typically 30 to 70 pages — that introduced general readers to subjects in economics, governance, science, culture, and biography. Booklets were sold at nominal, heavily subsidised prices — ften a few paisas or rupees — so that students and daily-wage workers could afford them.

The Trust commissioned leading scholars and critics to write in accessible, jargon-free language. Titles ranged across subjects such as taxation (Karvera Sha Mate? — Why Taxes?), inflation (Bhavo Kem Uncha Rahe Chhe? — Why Do Prices Keep Rising?), Indian culture (Bharatiya Sanskruti Shu Chhe? — What is Indian Culture?), and profiles of Gujarati literary figures. Dagli personally wrote approximately twenty booklets for the Trust.

For generations of Gujarati readers, the Parichay Trust booklets served as a primary source of self-education before the advent of the internet. Many publications have since been digitally archived by Rekhta Gujarati. He died on 6 December 1985 in Mumbai.

His Shiyalani Savarno Tadako (1975) includes his personal and autobiographical essays. Ranknu Aayojan (1980) includes essays on economics. Kavita Bhani (1982) includes literary essays. Thoda Nokha Jeev (1985) has biographical essays such as of Sukhlal Sanghvi, Swami Anand, Winston Churchill, Charlie Chaplin.

Sahaj (1976) is a collection of poems. Suna Sukan (1954) is a novel written with Yashawant Doshi. With Doshi, he translated And One Did Not Come Back by K. A. Abbas as Dr. Kotnis (1949) in Gujarati. He also edited memorial book on Jhaverchand Meghani with Doshi, Sauno Ladakvayo (1947).

He had also written about twenty short biographies for Parichay Trust. He had also edited 12 books in English.

He wrote a column Mumbai-ni Diary, focused on Mumbai and issues of India, in Ruchi magazine. Published every week in Commerce Weekly, his "Editor's Notebook" column was highly sought after and widely read for its thought-provoking commentary.

== Rural development and the water crisis ==
Dagli believed that India's macroeconomic planning was failing because policymakers were insufficiently acquainted with rural realities. He travelled extensively into villages across drought-prone regions of Gujarat and Maharashtra, studying the impact of water scarcity on small farmers and marginalised communities at first hand.

He opposed the government's emphasis on large-scale dam projects, arguing that such schemes took decades to complete, displaced poor communities, and frequently failed to deliver water to the tail-end villages most in need. Decades before "rainwater harvesting" and "[[watershed management]]" became mainstream policy terms, he advocated decentralised village-level solutions: digging small check-dams, desilting village ponds (talavs), and restoring traditional stepwells.

He argued that poverty reduction and industrialisation were impossible without first securing basic water access, and that water security was the absolute prerequisite for any economic progress. These insights are most fully articulated in Ranknu Aayojan (1980), large sections of which are devoted to the rural water and drought crisis. "What They Don't Teach You In Journalism Schools": Press Trust of India's Great Stories Behind News and Unsung Heroes, edited by Sameer C. Mohindru, compares Indian journalist Vadilal Dagli with Chinese reformer Deng Xiaoping by highlighting their respective critiques of economic over-regulation and advocacy for market-oriented changes. The comparison, found in the anthology of PTI stories, draws parallels between Dagli’s work on the Committee on Controls and Subsidies and Deng's structural reforms in China. The specific passage is in the printed edition available on Amazon India. https://www.amazon.in/What-They-Teach-Journalism-Schools/dp/9334131020

== Awards ==
He was awarded Narmad Suvarna Chandrak in 1975 for Shiyalani Savarno Tadako.

In 1978, Dagli was considered a strong candidate for a prestigious Government of India national honour in recognition of his contributions to economics and public life. He proactively declined the award before it was formally conferred, expressing the view that awards of this kind created artificial distinctions among people who had served the country equally but without recognition. He believed that true service to the country needs no medal.

== Selected bibliography ==
- Vadilal Dagli (1969). Two Decades of Indo-U.S. Relations. Vora.
- Vadilal Dagli (1970). India and Germany: A Survey of Economic Relations. Vora.
- Vadilal Dagli, ed. (1971). Commerce: Handbook of Election Manifestos.

https://the1991project.com/public-repository/committee-reports/report-committee-controls-and-subsidies-1979-chaired-vadilal
