= Ratan Rustomji Marshal =

Indian social worker and writer (1911–2011)

- Born: 14 October 1911; Bharuch, Bombay Presidency, British India
- Died: 16 January 2011 (aged 99); Ahmedabad, Gujarat, India
- Writing career
- Notable work: History of Gujarati journalism
- Notable awards: Narmad Suvarna Chandrak

Ratan Rustomji Marshal (14 October 1911 – 16 January 2011) was a Parsi social worker and litterateur. He was the first person to receive a PhD degree in Gujarati language for his dissertation, Gujarati Patrakaratvano Itihas (History of Gujarati journalism), in which he has chronicled the history of Gujarati journalism from the 19th century. His research is considered to be the original reference book of Gujarati journalism. He was awarded the Narmad Suvarna Chandrak for his autobiography in 1999.

== Life ==
Ratan Marshal was born on 14 October 1911 in Bharuch, Gujarat, India. He completed BA in 1934 and received a PhD for his dissertation Gujarati Patrakaratvano Itihas (History of Gujarati journalism) in 1949 from Bombay University. His wife Frenny was a doctor. He served in various posts in Surat parsi panchayat for 70 years. He spent the last phase of his life with his son Rustom, a senior counsel at the Gujarat High Court in Ahmedabad. He also did LLB with Rustom in the 70s. He died on 16 January 2011 at the age of 100.

== Writing ==
His short stories were published as Parsi Sansari Prem Katha. He has also written an autobiography named Katharatan. In 1950, he wrote a thesis on the history of Gujarati journalism. It was mandatory to write a PhD thesis in English, but he was allowed to use Gujarati as he wanted to add unique features of the language. Marshall also played a comic role in the Parsi version of an English play which was portrayed in Gujarati as Kutrani Punchhadi Vanki. He was more active in social activity than literature.

== Awards and honors ==
Marshal was awarded the Narmad Suvarna Chandrak for his autobiography Katharatan in 1999. He was felicitated by the Gujarati Sahitya Parishad. He was also awarded the D.Litt. by the Veer Narmad South Gujarat University in 2002.

== See also ==
- List of Gujarati-language writers
