= Prabhudas Gandhi =

Gujarati writer and translator

- Born: Prabhudas Gandhi; 4 December 1901; Porbandar, Bombay Presidency, British India
- Died: 6 May 1995 (aged 93); Rajkot, Gujarat, India
- Occupations: Author and translator
- Writing career
- Language: Gujarati
- Notable awards: Narmad Suvarna Chandrak (1948)

Prabhudas Gandhi (4 December 1901 – 6 May 1995) was an Indian freedom fighter,Gandhians, social worker, Gujarati language writer and translator. He was a son of Mahatma Gandhi's nephew Chhaganlal Gandhi. He was awarded the Narmad Suvarna Chandrak (1948) for his book Jivannu Parodh. (lit. 'Dawn of Life').

== Biography ==
Prabhudas Gandhi was born to father Chhaganlal Gandhi and mother Kashibahen Devi, on 4 December 1901 at Porbandar (now in Gujarat, India). In 1902, his father Chhaganlal Gandhi and uncle Maganlal Gandhi went to South Africa. Prabhudas arrived in South Africa with his mother in 1905. He spent his childhood at the Phoenix Ashram there. In 1914, he returned to India and studied at Gurukul Kangadi, Haridwar and at Santiniketan. In 1915, Mahatma Gandhi returned to India and established the Kochrab Ashram at Ahmedabad. Prabhudas was one of the original 25 inmates of the Ashram. In 1917, he participated in the Champaran Satyagraha and toured Bihar along with Gandhi and Kasturba. During the Non-cooperation movement in 1921, he worked with Mamasaheb Phalke in Godhra for the upliftment of manual scavengers.

He worked with Gulzarilal Nanda during the mill workers' strike at Ahmedabad. He worked as a tutor of spinning-wheel (charkha) with Jugatram Dave at the Bardoli Swaraj Ashram in south Gujarat. He invented a new type of charkha that could be operated with the user's feet. He named it the "Magan Charkha" in memory of his uncle Maganlal Gandhi.

In 1928, he was jailed for six months and sentenced to solitary confinement at Belgaum for participating in the Bardoli Satyagraha led by Vallabhbhai Patel. In 1929, when he was diagnosed with tuberculosis, he followed Gandhi's advice and moved to Almora in the Himalayas. In 1933, he married Ambadevi at the Women's Ashram, Wardha. The wedding was attended by Gandhi and Kasturba. During the Quit India Movement of 1942, Prabhudas was sentenced to two-and-a-half years in prison and sent to Bareilly jail. In 1946, he worked closely with the government and voluntary organizations in rural areas of Delhi and Uttar Pradesh. He also worked for Vinoba Bhave's Bhoodan movement.

On 6 May 1995, he died at the Gram Swaraj Mandal at Pardi in Rajkot district at the age of 93.

== Writing ==
Gandhi's autobiographical publication Jivannu Parodh (lit. 'Dawn of Life') was awarded the Narmad Suvarna Chandrak. He translated the autobiography of Rajendra Prasad in Gujarati as Mari Jivankatha (1950). My childhood with Gandhiji (1957), Gitaka Samajdharma, Ootabapa no Vadlo (1972) – a family tree of Gandhi family and Ashram Bhajano no Swadhyaya (1978) are his other published works. His book Bapu na Jugatrambhai chronicles the bond between Gandhi and Jugatram Dave.

== Awards and honors ==
He was awarded the Narmad Suvarna Chandrak (1948) by the Narmad Sahitya Sabha for his book Jivannu Parodh.

== See also ==
- List of Gujarati-language writers
