= Heera Pathak =

Gujarati poet and literary critic

- Born: Heeraben Kalyanray Mehta; 12 April 1916; Mumbai
- Died: 15 September 1995 (aged 79); Mumbai
- Education: PhD
- Alma mater: SNDT Women's University
- Occupations: Poet, literary critic, professor
- Spouse: Ramnarayan V. Pathak
- Writing career
- Language: Gujarati
- Notable works: Apanu Vivechansahitya (1939); Paraloke Patra (1978)
- Notable awards: Narmad Suvarna Chandrak (1968-1972); Uma-Snehrashmi Prize (1970-1971); Ranjitram Suvarna Chandrak (1974); Sahitya Gaurav Puraskar (1995)

Heera Ramnarayan Pathak, born Heera Kalyanray Mehta (12 April 1916 – 15 September 1995), was a Gujarati poet and literary critic. She married Ramnarayan V. Pathak, a Gujarati writer.

== Life ==
She was born on 12 April 1916 in Mumbai. She completed a Bachelor of Arts in 1936 from S.N.D.T University with Gujarati as her main subject. She received a Ph.D. in 1938 for her research work Aapnu Vivechan Sahitya (History of Our Literary Criticism), which was published as a book in 1939. She was a professor of Gujarati at S.N.D.T University from 1938 to 1972. She was the president of Gujarati Adhyapak Sangh for 1970–1971 and also was vice-president of Gujarati Sahitya Parishad for a few years.

She married as the second wife of Gujarati writer Ramnarayan V. Pathak, who predeceased her on 21 August 1955. The marriage was childless. She died of cancer on 15 September 1995 at Mumbai.

== Works ==
She published her first critical work, Aapnu Vivechan Sahitya, her doctoral thesis, in 1939. In this work, she examines the critic from two angles. First, she elaborates the point of view embodied in the critical works of a particular critic, and then she analyses how that particular point of view has contributed to the development of Gujarati literary criticism. Her two other critically acclaimed works are Kavyabhavan (Critical appreciation of poetry, 1961) and Vidrati (1974). Her Paraloke Patra (Letters written to another world), published in 1978, is a collection of twelve letters written in verse, addressed to her deceased husband Ramnarayan Pathak. Written in the Gujarati metre of vanveli, these letters are elegiac in nature. Another work, Gavaksha Deep, published in 1979, is a collection of articles on Sanskrit poetry.

== Recognition ==
She received the Narmad Suvarna Chandrak of 1968–1972 and the Uma-Snehrashmi Prize of 1970–1971 for Parloke Patra. She was also awarded the Ranjitram Suvarna Chandrak in 1974 and the Sahitya Gaurav Puraskar in 1995.

== See also ==
- List of Gujarati-language writers
