= Sundarji Betai =

Indian Gujarati-language poet, critic and translator (1905-1989)

- Born: 10 August 1905; Bet Dwarka, Baroda State, British India
- Died: 16 January 1989 (aged 83); Mumbai, Maharashtra, India
- Education: MA, LLB
- Alma mater: University of Bombay
- Occupations: Poet, critic, translator
- Writing career
- Pen name: Dwaipayan, Mitravarunau

Sundarji Gokaldas Betai (10 August 1905 – 16 January 1989) was Gujarati poet, critic and translator from India. Educated for a Masters in Gujarati, he taught Gujarati at SNDT Women's College for years. He was a prolific poet who had published nine poetry collections.

== Biography ==
Betai was born on 10 August 1905 in Bet Dwarka. He completed BA in English and Gujarati from University of Bombay in 1928, LLB in 1932 and MA in Gujarati and Sanskrit in 1936.

He served as a subeditor in Hindustan and Prajamitra publications for about four or five years. Later he served as a principal in a college in Bombay (now Mumbai) and later joined SNDT Women's College where he served as a professor of Gujarati until his retirement. He was a member of the Indian PEN. He died on 16 January 1989 in Mumbai, Maharashtra, India.

== Works ==
Betai was a prolific poet and wrote poetry for more than fifty years. He was heavily influenced by his teacher Narsinhrao Divetia's poetry as well as Sanskrit metres which is visible in his generally serious style and gentle tones in khandakavyas (epic poems) and elegies. Though he has not participated in the Indian independence movement, he was influenced by the Gandhian philosophy and the popularity of sonnets then. Dwaipayan and Mitravarunau were his pseudonyms.

Jyotirekha (1934) is a collection of five epic poems based on Puranic, mythological and historical events. Later four more epic poems were added to it. Indradhanu (1939) has 111 poems divided in five sections. Visheshanjali (1952) has some poems influenced by the metres of folk songs while many poems have a sea as the metaphor. Sadgat Chandrasheelane (1959) is a long elegy divided in nine sections written in memory of his late wife in which he recounts his 36-year long married life. Tulsidal (1961) has 54 poems including Sadgat Chandrasheelane as well as a poetic translation of Dhammapada and a popular song "Panje Vatanji Galyu". Vyanjana (1969) and Anuvyanjana (1974) have spiritual and philosophical poems. Shishire Vasant (1976) has 34 poems and 21 verses while Shravani Jharmar (1982) has 72 poems.

He has also written some works of criticism. Suvarnamegh (1964) includes criticism of poetry of Nhanalal, Balwantray Thakore and Jhaverchand Meghani as well as previously published Gujarati Sahityama Sonnet (Sonnets in Gujarati Literature, 1935). Aamod (1978) is a critical study of Gujarati and Sanskrit poets and their poems. Narsinhrao (1980) is a concise monograph of Narsinhrao Divetia.

He has translated William Moreton Condry's Thoreau, a biography of Henry David Thoreau, as Mahamanav Thoreau in Gujarati. He has also translated Thoreau's Walden in Gujarati. He has also translated last four cantos of Mahabharata and verse rendering of Bhagvad Gita as Romharshini. Sahityamadhuri, Sahityodyan and Sahityasushma are his edited educational works.

== Awards ==
He was awarded the Narmad Suvarna Chandrak in 1958 for Tulsidal.

== See also ==
- List of Gujarati-language writers
