= Narayan Desai =

Indian Gandhian

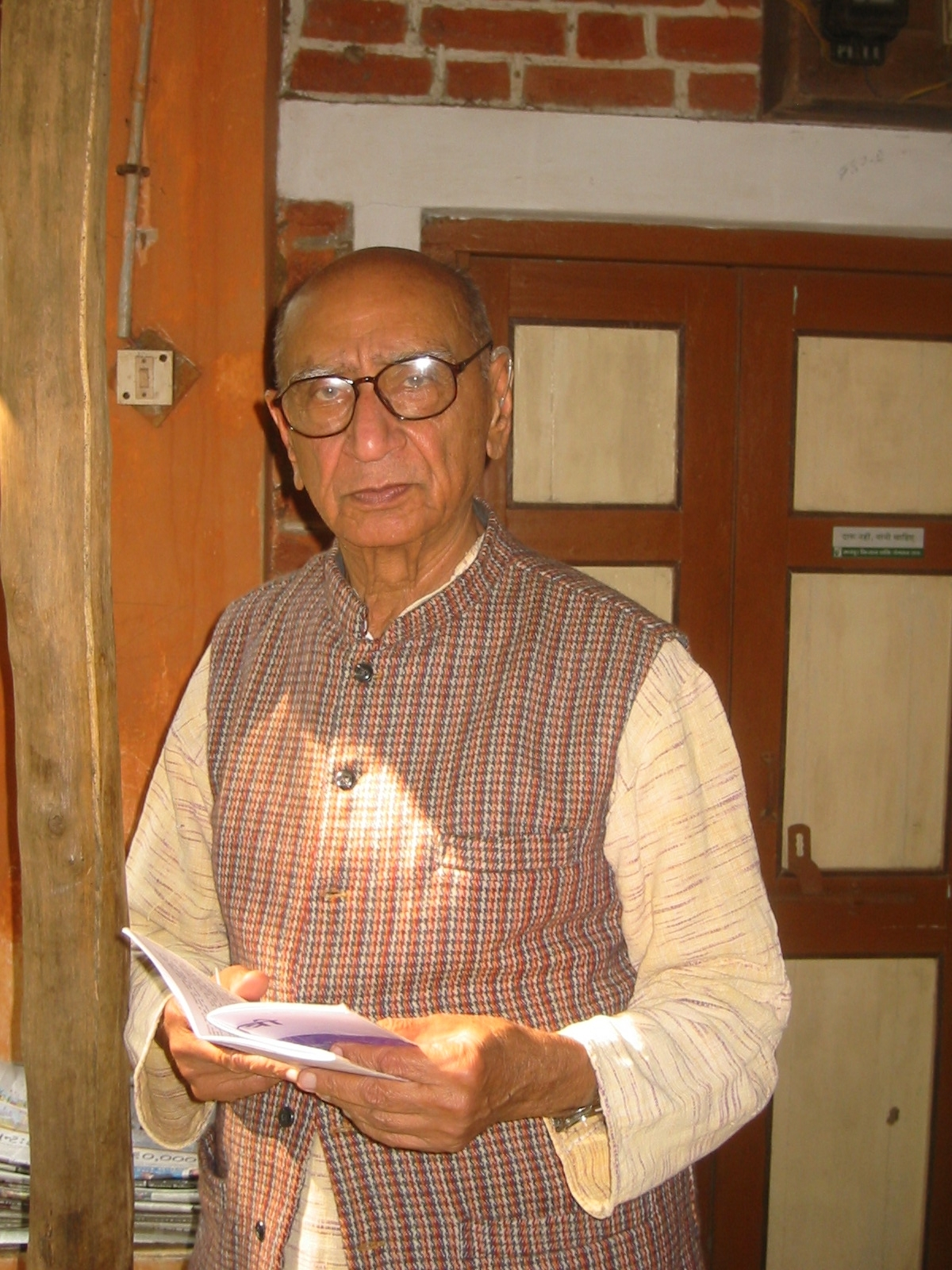
At Vedchhi, January 2007

Narayan Desai (24 December 1924 – 15 March 2015) was an Indian Gandhian and author.

== Early life ==
The son of Mahatma Gandhi's personal secretary and biographer Mahadev Desai, he was born in Bulsar (now Valsad), Gujarat on 24 December 1924. Brought up in Gandhi's Ashram in Sabarmati, Ahmedabad and Sevagram near Wardha, Narayan stopped attending school to be educated and trained by his father and other residents of the Ashram. He specialized in basic education, spinning and weaving khadi.

== Initial years ==
After his marriage to Uttara Chaudhury, daughter of freedom fighter parents, Nabakrushna Chaudhury and Malatidevi Chaudhury, the young couple moved to Vedchhi, a tribal village 60 km from Surat in Gujarat, to work as teachers in a Nai Taleem school. Following the Bhoodan movement launched by Vinoba Bhave, Narayan traversed through the length and breadth of Gujarat, by foot, collecting land from the rich and distributing the same among the poor landless villagers. He started the mouthpiece of Bhoodan movement, titled Bhoomiputra (Son of the Soil) and remained its editor till 1959.

== Practising Gandhian philosophy ==
Narayan joined the Akhil Bharatiya Shanti Sena Mandal (Indian Peace Brigade), founded by Vinoba and headed by veteran socialist leader Jayaprakash Narayan (widely known as "JP"). As the general secretary of the Shanti Sena, Narayan recruited and trained peace volunteers throughout the country who intervened during ethnic conflicts and helped establish harmony among conflicting communities.

Narayan was involved in the setting up of Peace Brigades International and was elected as the chairman of the War Resisters' International. He along with a Pakistani peace group were awarded the UNESCO prize for International Peace.

Narayan was active in the campaign against the imposition of emergency in India and brought out a magazine defying the censorship laws. As a close associate of JP, Narayan played an important role in helping the newly formed Janata Party, a conglomeration of major non-Congress political parties in India, arrive at a consensus on the name of Morarji Desai as the Prime Minister.

Following JP's death, Narayan moved to Vedchhi and set up the Sampoorna Kranti Vidyalaya (Institute for Total Revolution). The Institute imparts training in non-violence and Gandhian way of life. Narayan, as a way of paying tribute to his father, Mahadev Desai, wrote a four-volume biography of Gandhi in Gujarati, a dream his father could not fulfil in his lifetime because of his sudden death in prison on 15 August 1942.

He recited 'Gandhi-Katha'(narratives on the life of Mahatma Gandhi) across the world starting 2004. The biography was written in four volumes containing 2000 pages. After completing Gandhi's biography he thought that very few people would buy this book due to its volume and high price. He thought of a novel idea for spreading Gandhi's message. He started Gandhi Katha. Like Ramayan and Bhagwat katha he started Gandhi Katha. For seven days X 3 hours he narrated the life and thought of Gandhi. He also sang songs written and composed by him during katha. His katha depended on audience. To some he would tell about Gandhi's political activities and to the executives he would tell about the leadership and management skill of Gandhi. This katha telling disperse many wrong perception about Mahatma prevailing in the minds of public. He also narrated many unpublished and unknown incidents of the life of Gandhi. This katha was very popular in India and overseas. He took this venture of Katha telling at the age of 81. He served as Chancellor of Gujarat Vidyapith since 23 July 2007, but resigned from the post in November 2014.

== Death ==
He slipped into coma on 10 December 2014 but later recovered and spun charkha. He had difficulties in daily activities and was on liquid diet. He died on 15 March 2015 at Mahavir Trauma Centre, Surat. He was cremated at Sampoorna Kranti Vidyalaya (Institute for Total Revolution) at Vedchhi on the same day.

== Awards ==
Narayan was accorded the Sahitya Akademi Award for Gujarati in 1993 for the biography of his father Mahadev Desai he wrote as part of the centenary celebrations of Gandhi's close aide. Earlier, Narayan's book about his childhood reminiscences of Gandhi too had won the Sahitya Academy Award.

He was awarded the Jamnalal Bajaj Award in 1999 and the UNESCO-Madanjeet Singh Prize for the Promotion of Tolerance and Non-Violence in 1998 "for his tireless work in favour of the promotion ofinter-religious and inter-ethnic understanding, tolerance and harmony and his achievements in the education and training for non-violence and peace, as well as anti-nuclear activism."

He also received Ranjitram Suvarna Chandrak, the highest award of Gujarati literature, in 2001. He was also awarded Narmad Suvarna Chandrak in 1989 for his Gujarati work Agnikundma Ugelu Gulab.

Desai won the 18th Moortidevi Award for the year 2004, given by Bharatiya Jnanpith, for his famous work ‘Maroon Jeewan Aj Mari Vaani’, which is based upon the life, philosophy and work of Mahatma Gandhi.

He was awarded the Dhirubhai Thakar Savyasachi Saraswat Award in 2013.
