= Narmad Suvarna Chandrak =

- Civilian award for contributions to Literature
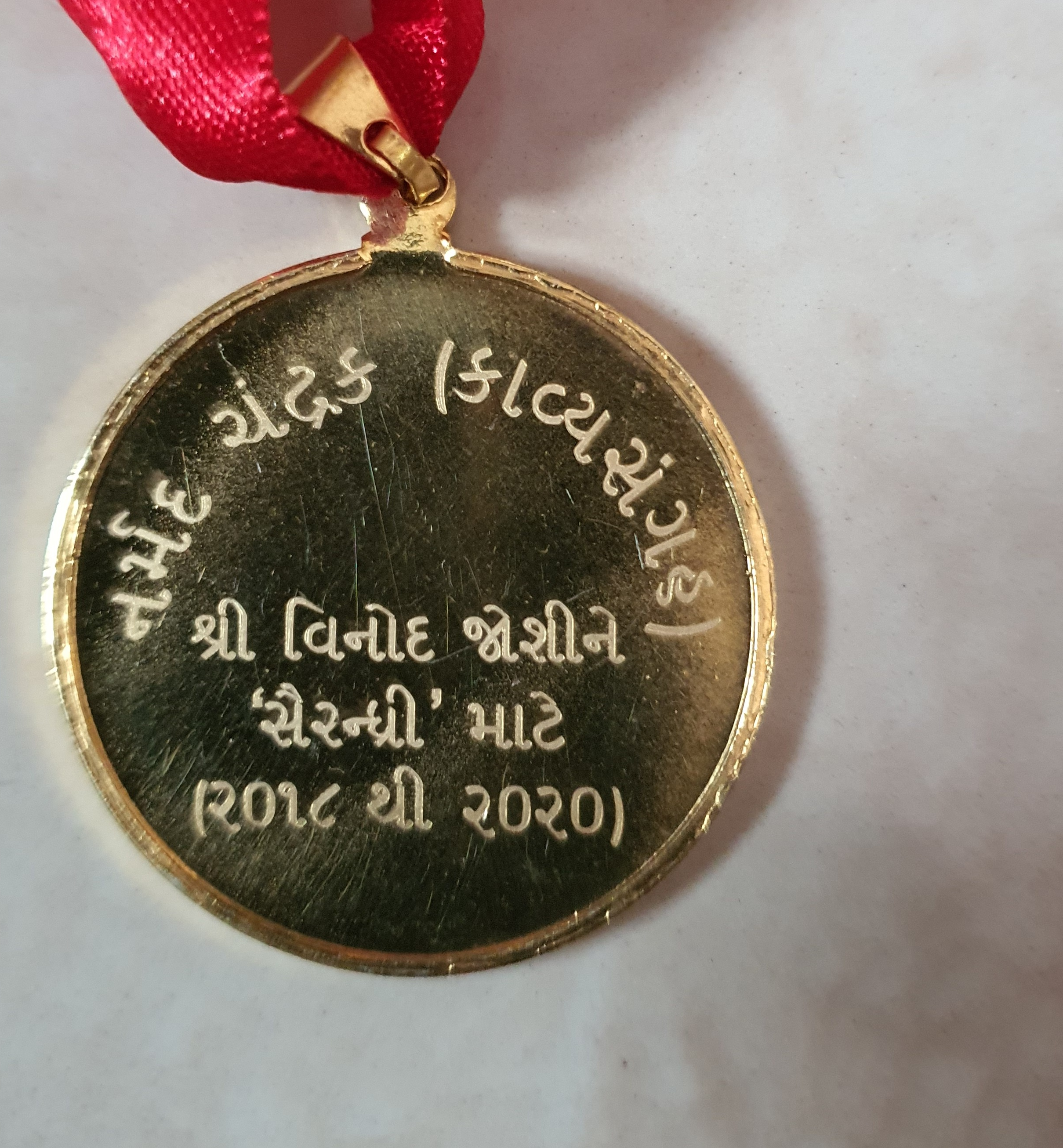
- Awarded for: Literary honour
- Sponsored by: Narmad Sahitya Sabha, Surat
- Location: Gujarat, India
- First award: 1940
- Final award: 2022

Highlights
- First winner: Jyotindra Dave
- Last winner: Vinod Joshi

Narmad Suvarna Chandrak (Gujarati: નર્મદ સુવર્ણ ચંદ્રક), also known as the Narmad Gold Medal or Narmad Chandrak, is a literary honour in Gujarat, India. It is bestowed by the organisation known as Narmad Sahitya Sabha, Surat, in remembrance of renowned Gujarati poet Narmad. Each year, the medal is awarded to the author of the most outstanding book written in the Gujarati language.

== Recipients ==
The recipients of the Narmad Suvarna Chandrak listed by year:

Year	Recipient	Book
1940–44	Jyotindra Dave	Rangtarang
1941–45	Ramlal Chunilal Modi	Drayashray Kavyama Madhyakalin Gujaratni Sthiti
1942–46	Chandravadan Mehta	Dharagurjari
1943–47	Umashankar Joshi	Prachina
1944–48	Prabhudas C. Gandhi	Jivan Nu Parodh
1945–49	Vishnuprasad Trivedi	Parishilan
1946–50	Ramnarayan V. Pathak	Bruhatpingal
1947–51	Chunilal Madiya	Rangda
1948–52	Sundaram	Yatra
1949–53	Dhumketu	Jivanpanth
1950–54	Kishansinh Chavda	Amaas Na Tara
1951–55	Hariprasad Shastri	Maitrakkalin Gujarat
1952–56	Shivkumar Joshi	Sumangala
1953–57	Niranjan Bhagat	Chhandolay
1954–58	Indulal Yagnik	Atmakatha
1955–59	Vijayray Vaidya	Gat Shatak Nu Sahitya
1956–60	Bhogilal Sandesara	Mahaamatya Vastupalnu Sahityamandal; Ane Sanskrit Sahitya Par Teni Asar
1957–61	Dhansukhlal Mehta	Garib Ni Jhunpadi
1958–62	Sundarji Betai	Tulsidal
1959–63	Ravjibhai Patel	Jivan Na Jharana
1960–64	Ramprasad Bakshi	Vadmayvimarsh
1961–65	Kanaiyalal Dave	Gujarat Nu Murtividhan
1962–66	Pragaji Dosa	Ghar No Divo
1963–67	Natwarlal Pandya 'Ushnas'	Trun No Grah
1964–68	Jayant Pathak	Vananchal
1965–69	Suresh Joshi	Janantike
1966–70	Kalyanrai N. Joshi	Okhamandal Na Vaghero
1967–71	Vajubhai Tank	Ramta Rup
1968–72	Heera Pathak	Paraloke Patra
1969–73	Kamlashankar Pandya	Veran Jivan
1970–74	Anantrai Raval	Unmilan
1971–75	Pravinbhai Parikh	Prachin Gujaratma Brahmithi Nagari; Lipi Vikas
1972–76	Madhu Rye	Kumar Ni Agashi
1973–77	Rajendra Shah	Madhama
1974–78	Mukund Parasharya	Satvashil
1975–79	Vadilal Dagli	Shiyalani Savarno Tadko
1976–80	Hasmukh Sankaliya	Akhand Bharatma Sanskrutino Ushakal
1977–81	Rasiklal Parikh	Mena Gujari
1978–82	Ramesh Parekh	Khading
1979–83	Snehrashmi	Safalyatanu
1980–84	Yashvant Shukla	Kendra Ane Parigh
1981–85	Dr. J.P Amin	Gujaratnu Shaiv Murtividhan
1982–86	Labhshankar Thakar	Pilu Gulab Ane Hu
1983–87	Chandrakant Sheth	Padgha Ni Pele Paar
1984–88	Swami Sachchidanand	Mara Anubhavo
1985–89	Harivallabh Bhayani	Kavyaprapanch
1986–90	Dr. Ramanlal N. Mehta	Vadodara: Ek Adhyayan
1987–91	Hasmukh Baradi	Rai No Darpanray
1988–92	Suresh Dalal	Padadhvani
1989–93	Narayan Desai	Agnikundma Ugelu Gulab
1990–94	Gunvant Shah	Dhai Akshar Prem Ka
1991–95	Vishnu Pandya	Gujaratna Swatantra Sangramno Itihas
1992–96	Ravindra Parekh	Ghar Vagarna Dhvar
1993–97	Harikrishna Pathak	Jalna Padgha
1994–98	Yogesh Joshi	Moti Ba
1995–99	Raghuvir Chaudhari	Tilak Kare Raghuvir
1996–00	Mugatlal Bavisi	Limbadi Rajya No Itihas
1997–01	Sitanshu Yashaschandra	Kaho Makanji Kyan Chalya?
1998–02	Jawahar Bakshi	Tarapana Na Shaher Ma
1999–03	Ratan Marshal	Atmakathanak
2000–04	Ratilal 'Anil'	
2001–05	Mohan Meghani	The 19th Century Surat
2002–06	Satish Vyas	Jalne Padade
2003–07	Rajendra Shukla	
2005–09	Bhagwatikumar Sharma	Surat Muj Ghayal Bhoomi
2008–12	Raeesh Maniar	Aam Lakhvu Karave Alakhni Safar
2012–16	Bharat Dave	Vastavvadi Natak
2017–19	Dhwanil Parekh	Ek Chapti Ungh
2018–20	Vinod Joshi	Sairandhri
2019–21	Bharat Kheni	Raja Ravi Verma
2021	Pravin Darji	Nadigan
