= Manju Mehta =

Indian sitar player (1945–2024)

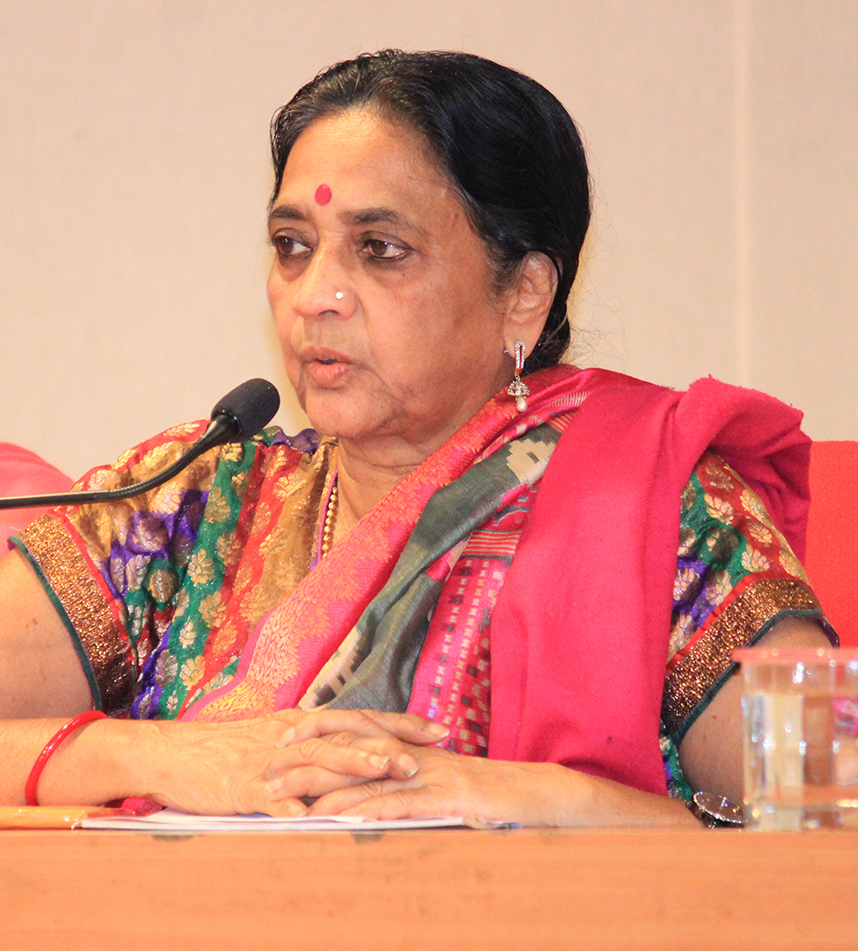
- Mehta in 2020

Background information
- Born: 21 May 1945; Jaipur, Jaipur State, India
- Died: 20 August 2024 (aged 79) Ahmedabad, Gujarat, India
- Genres: Indian classical music
- Occupation: Musician
- Instrument: Sitar
- Years active: 1955–2024
- Spouse: Nandan Mehta ()

Vidushi Manju Mehta (born Manju Bhatt; 21 May 1945 – 20 August 2024) was an Indian classical sitar player.

== Background ==
Mehta was born on 21 May 1945 in Jaipur, to Manhohan and Chandrakalav Bhatt. She grew up in a family of musicians; both of her parents were accomplished musicians, with her mother studying with several court musicians. Her older brother Shashi Mohan Bhatt and younger brother Vishwa Mohan Bhatt would both be recognized as pandits later in life.

Sashi Mohan, a student of Ravi Shankar, was his sister Manju's first sitar teacher. After winning two consecutive State and Central Government scholarships, she was given the opportunity to study under sarod player Pandit Damodar Lal Kabra, a disciple of Ali Akbar Khan and Shankar.

While studying and recording with Kabra, Mehta began performing, competed in the All India Radio competition, and earned her master's degree in music. During one performance, she met tabla player Nandan Mehta, a student of Kishan Maharaj and exponent of the Banaras gharana. Manju and Nandan would later marry, having two daughters—Poorvi and Hetal, who respectively play sitar and tabla—before Nandan's death in 2010.

Mehta died on 20 August 2024, at the age of 79.

== Career ==
After marrying Nandan and the births of her two children, Mehta did not perform for almost a decade before, in 1980, she was accepted (like her earlier teachers Bhatt and Kabra) to study with Ravi Shankar.

Mehta was a top grade classical instrumentalist, the highest grade of musicians in All India Radio's rating system. She was the co-founder of Saptak school of music @ Saptak trustSaptak Festival of Music held every year in Ahmedabad.

== Awards ==
- Sangeet Natak Academy of Gujarat
- Tansen Samman, 2018
- Dhirubhai Thakar Savyasachi Saraswat Award, 2016.
