= Ruchi (magazine) =

- Cover page of first issue, January 1963. The cover art is by Abhay Khatau
- Editor: Chunilal Madia
- Categories: Literary magazine
- Frequency: Monthly
- Founder: Chunilal Madia
- First issue: January 1963
- Final issue: December 1968
- Country: India
- Language: Gujarati
- Website: wiki.ekatrafoundation.org/wiki/રુચિ

Ruchi was a literary magazine published in Gujarati language by author and journalist Chunilal Madia from January 1963 to December 1968.

== History ==
Chunilal Madia left the United States Information Service in 1962 and started Ruchi monthly. He termed it as a magazine for creative thought. It published its last issue in December 1968 as Madia died the same month.

== Content ==
Ruchi published an analysis of literary and cultural trends in Gujarati as well as other Indian languages and the world.

Madia himself wrote a column Chhindu Kholta under the pen name Akho Rupero. He also wrote on social issues in Bahyantar column. He had also written on several prominent personalities and authors in it such as Virchand Gandhi, Krishnaji Holaji Aara, Abdul Rahim, Apabhai Almelkar, Jayant Khatri, Ishwar Petlikar, Umashankar Joshi, Albert Camus, Jean-Paul Sartre, Henry Miller, Behramji Malabari, Octavio Paz, Karl Marx, Shayda, Jhaverchand Meghani, Jyotindra Dave, Dhoomketu, Samuel Johnson, Dag Hammarskjöld, Yevgeny Yevtushenko, Mikhail Sholokhov, Romain Rolland, Boris Pasternak, Leo Tolstoy, Anton Chekhov, Ernest Hemingway, D. H. Lawrence as well as on modern literature. Vadilal Dagli wrote a column Mumbai-ni Diary focused on Mumbai and issues in India. Jayant Pathak published his autobiography Vananchal in serial. Manubhai Pancholi's novel Kurukshetra was started in it but stopped after some episodes. Alan Paton's play, Cry, the Beloved Country was translated by Madia as Bhom Rade Bhenkar which stopped after just three episodes. Several other writers have published criticism, essays and works on authors in it. The cover art and other art in the magazine were drawn by various artists such as Raghav Kaneria, Abhay Khatau, K. K. Hebbar, Krishnaji Holaji Aara, Abdul Rahim, Apabhai Almelkar, Bhanu Shah, Leena Sanghvi, Dinesh Shah, Chhaganlal Jadav, Jyoti Bhatt, Laxman Pai, Shyavaksh Chavda, Sudhir Khastagir, Raju. Indradev Acharya and Bansilal Verma ‘Chakor' published cartoons in it.

It published special issues on Jawaharlal Nehru, Jhaverchand Meghani and short stories.

== See also ==
- List of Gujarati-language magazines
