= Ramnarayan V. Pathak =

Gujarati author from India (1887-1955)

Ramnarayan Vishwanath Pathak
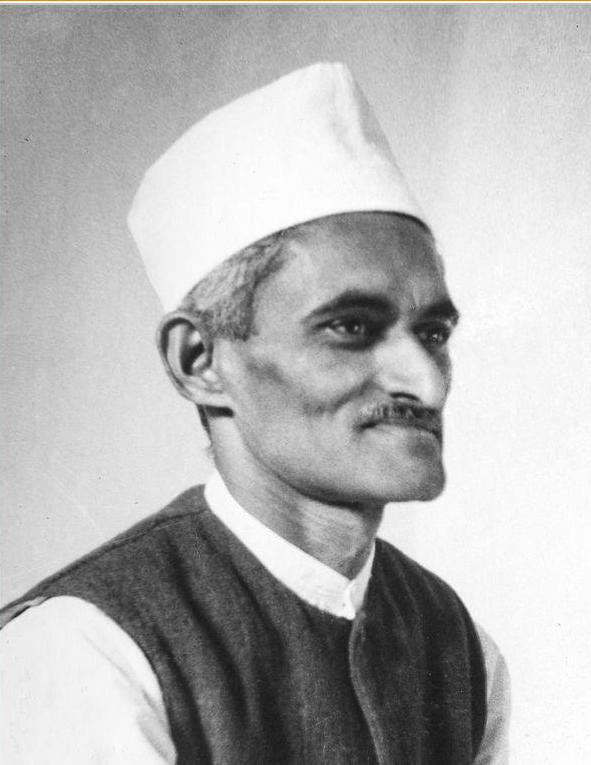
- Born: Ramnarayan Vishwanath Pathak; 9 April 1887; Ganol, Dholka Taluka, Ahmedabad, Bombay presidency, British India
- Died: 21 August 1955 (aged 68); Bombay (now Mumbai)
- Education: Bachelor of Arts, Bachelor of Law
- Alma mater: Wilson College, Mumbai
- Occupations: Writer, critic
- Spouse: Heera Pathak
- Writing career
- Pen name: Dwiref, Shesh, Swairvihari
- Language: Gujarati
- Period: Gandhian Era
- Notable work: Brihat Pingal
- Notable awards: Narmad Suvarna Chandrak (1949); Sahitya Akademi Award (1956)

Academic work
- Doctoral students: Dhirubhai Thaker

Ramnarayan Vishwanath Pathak was an Indian Gujarati-language poet, short story writer, essayist and literary critic from India. Profoundly influenced by Gandhian thought, Pathak wrote criticism, poetry, drama, metrics and short stories. He edited and translated several literary works. He was appointed the president of Gujarati Sahitya Parishad (Gujarati Literary Council) in 1946. He was awarded the Narmad Suvarna Chandrak for his book Prachin Gujarati Chhando in 1949 and Sahitya Akademi Award for Bruhat Pingal in 1956.

== Early life ==
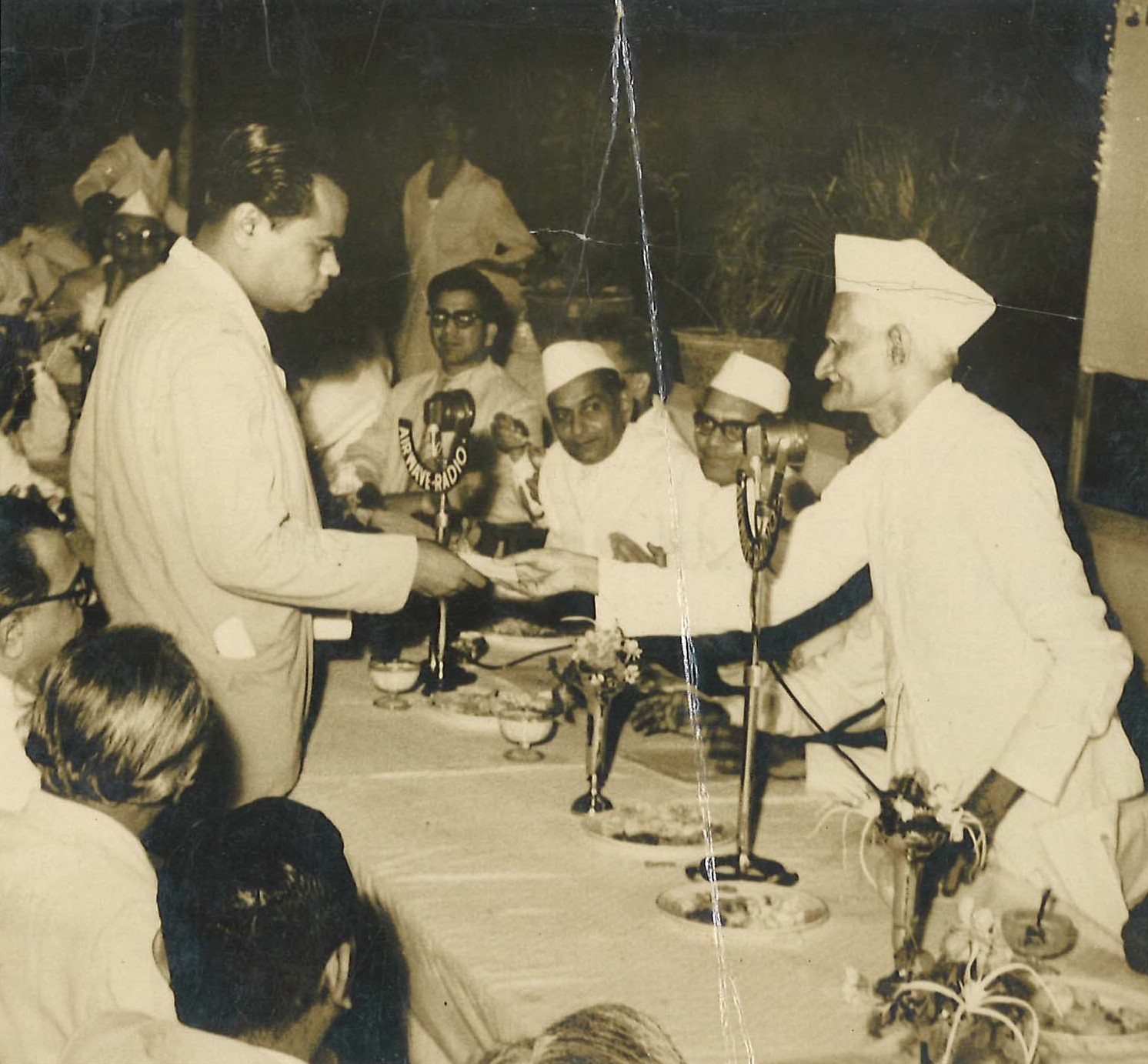
Ramnarayan Pathak and Chunilal Madia

Ramnarayan Vishwanath Pathak was born on 8 April 1887 in Ganol, a village in Gujarat (now in Dholka Taluka, Ahmedabad district). He completed primary and secondary education from Jetpur, Rajkot, Jamkhambhaliya and Bhavnagar. In 1904, he matriculated and enrolled at Samaldas College, Bhavnagar, receiving scholarship. Then he joined Wilson College, Mumbai (then Bombay), and in 1908 completed a Bachelor of Arts in logic and morale philosophy, for which he received a fellowship.

== Career and activism ==
Pathak taught Sanskrit at Wilson College. In 1911, he completed a Bachelor of Laws from Bombay University and worked as a legal advocate in Ahmedabad and Sadra for seven years. Later, when he was diagnosed with tuberculosis, he left the legal practice and settled in Sadra in 1919. On invitation by Indulal Yagnik, he briefly worked as the principal of J. L. New English School of Gujarat Kelvani Mandal in 1920. During the non-cooperation movement in 1920, he was influenced by Mahatma Gandhi which led him to join Gujarat Vidyapith along with Rasiklal Parikh as a professor in 1921. He taught logic, epistemology and literature there until 1928. During this time, his articles on education and literature were published in magazines Sabarmati, Puratatva, Yugdharma and Gujarat. He left Gujarat Vidyapith and served as an editor of Prasthan, a Gujarati magazine founded in 1926. He participated in different movements led by Gandhi for which he was jailed.

From 1935, he joined SNDT University, Bombay as a professor. He also taught at L. D. Arts College, Ahmedabad; at Bhavan's College and Bharatiya Vidya Bhavan, Bombay; and at the post-graduate department of Gujarat Vidhya Sabha until 1952. He was engaged with teaching and research activities at Bharatiya Vidya Bhavan, Bombay, until his death. In 1953, he served as an adviser to Gujarati department of Bombay Radio Station. He served as the president of Gujarati Sahitya Parishad (Gujarati Literary Council) in 1946.

He died on 21 August 1955 in Mumbai following a cardiac arrest.

=== Personal life ===
Pathak married twice. His second marriage was to Heera Pathak, who was also poet and literary critic. The couple had no children.

== Works ==
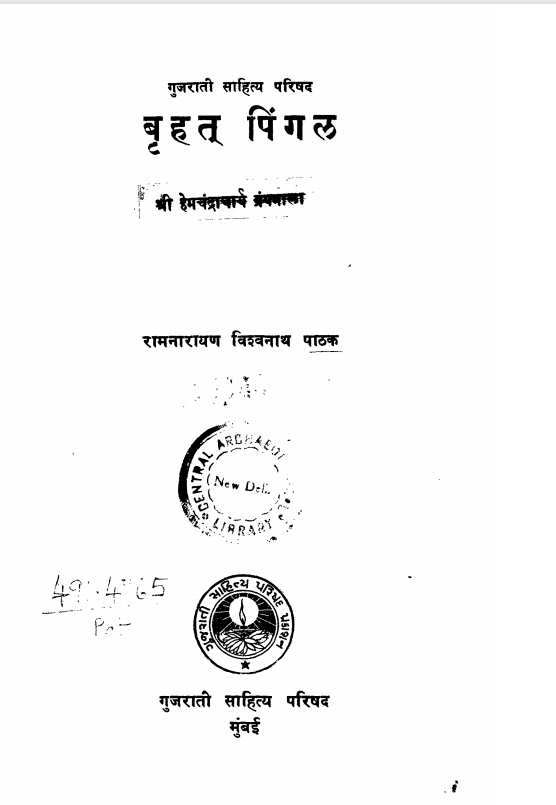
Title page of Brihatpingal, published in Devanagari script, 1955

Pathak was a prolific writer of criticism, poetry, drama, metrics and short stories, and also edited and translated works of others. Pathak was profoundly influenced by Gandhian thought but retained his originality and literary exuberance. He wrote short stories under the pen name "Dwiref", poems under "Shesh" and essays under "Swairvihari". His literary career began with a critical article, "The poems of poet Balashankar Ullasram Kantharia", published in the first issue of Sabarmati in 1922. He also wrote literary observations for Yugdharm.

Pathak is well known for his Gujarati short stories. He published three volumes of short stories entitled Dwirefni Vato (1928, 1935, 1942). His most acclaimed stories are Mukundrai, Khemi and Jakshani. The first of these suggests that modern education degenerates human values; the second is of love between two members of the lower castes considered to be his most memorable characters; the third reflects his subtle sense of humor. His stories are emotionally linked with life.

He published a collection of 68 poems, Sheshna Kavyo (1938), expanded to 73 in a second edition (1951). Visheshna Kavyo, his other collection of poems, was published posthumously in 1959.

He considered criticism as an act of social responsibility. His critical works include Arvachin Kavya Sahityana Vaheno (1935) and Sahityavimarsha (1939). His other critical works include Arvachin Gujarati Kavyasahitya (1933), Kavya Ni Shakti (1939), Aalochana (1944), Narmadashankar Kavi (1936), Narmad: Arvachin Gadya Padya No Aadya Praneta (1945), Sahityalok (1954), Nabhovihar (1961) and Aakalan (1964). He wrote a critical introduction for Sharadsamiksha (1980), and translated stories of Sarat Chandra Chattopadhyay. Some of his critical articles are also published in Kavyaparishilan (1965).

Kulangar ane Biji Krutio (1959, posthumous) is a collection of dramas while Swairvihar part 1-2-3 (1931, 1937), Nitya no Aachar (1945) and Manovihar (1956) are collections of his essays.

Pathak did extensive research in metres of poetry published as Brihat Pingal, for which he was recognized with the Sahitya Akademi Award in 1956. It is a scientific presentation of structure and history of Gujarati prosody. He co-edited several works with Umashankar Joshi; Kavyatatvavichar (1939), Sahityavichar (1942), Digdarshan (1942), Vicharmadhuri: Part 1 (1946). He also edited annotated edition of Purvalap, Apno Dharma (3rd edition, 1942), Ras Ane Garba (with Govardhan Panchal, 1954), Govindgaman (with Narhari Parikh, for textbook, 1923). He also edited Kavyasammuchchay Part 1-2 (1924) and Kavyaparichay (with Nagindas Parekh, 1928).

He co-translated several works including Mammata Bhatta's Kavyaprakash 1-6 (with Rasiklal Parikh, 1924), Dhammapad (with Dharmanand Kosambi, 1924) and Chumban ane Biji Vartao (as Vama in second edition, with Nagindas Parekh, 1928). His other works include Pramanpraveshika (1922) and Nityano Achar (1945).

== Recognition ==
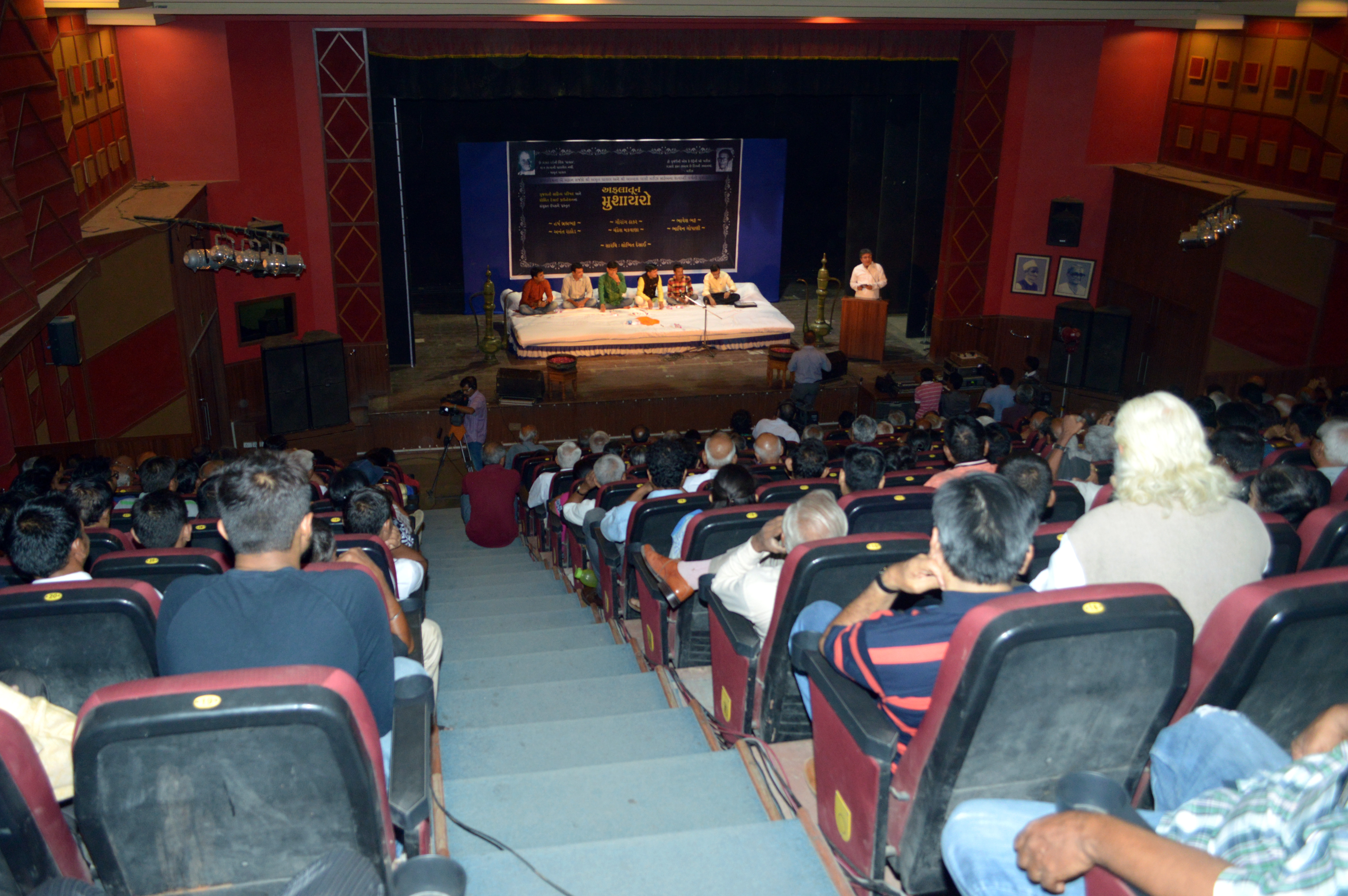
R. V. Pathak Hall of Gujarati Sahitya Parishad is named after him.

Umashankar Joshi honoured him as Sahitya Guru of the Gandhian era and Yashvant Shukla considers him "the highest peak of Gujarati short stories".

He was awarded Motisinhji Mahida Gold Medal in 1943 for his short story Uttar Marg no Lop (1940), Hargovinddas Kantawala Award and Narmad Suvarna Chandrak for Prachin Gujarati Chhando in 1949 and Sahitya Akademi Award for Bruhat Pingal in 1956.

== See also ==
- List of Gujarati-language writers
