= Nandan Mehta =

- Born: 26 February 1942; Ahmedabad, Gujarat
- Origin: India
- Died: 26 March 2010 (aged 68)
- Genres: Benaras Gharana
- Occupation: Musician
- Instrument: Tabla
- Spouse: Manju Mehta ()

Pandit Nandan Mehta (26 February 1942 – 26 March 2010) was an Indian tabla player and music teacher from Ahmedabad who belonged to the Benaras Gharana of Hindustani classical music. He established Saptak School of Music and started Saptak Annual Festival of Music in 1980.

== Early life ==
Pandit Nandan Mehta was born on 26 February 1942 to Yashodhar Mehta, a writer and lawyer, and Vasumati, a painter and daughter of Sir Chinubhai Baronet. His grandfather Narmadashanker Mehta was a reputed Vedanta scholar.

He was trained under Kishan Maharaj and was a tabla exponent of the Banaras Gharana. He introduced Banaras Gharana to Gujarat.

== Musical career ==
He was a Senior A Grade artist of All India Radio and Doordarshan. His performances won him acclaim. He performed extensively across the country and participated in the AIR National Programmes as well as the Akashvani Sangeet Sammelan. He also served to AIR on their Staff Selection Committee, Ahmedabad and also served on their Music Audition Board.

He established Saptak School of Music and started Saptak Annual Festival of Music in 1980.

== Death ==
Nandan Mehta succumbed to oral cancer on 26 March 2010. His wife, Manju Mehta is a sitar player and his two daughters, Poorvi Mehta, a sitar player and Hetal Mehta, a tabla player.

The gallery dedicated to his life and the Saptak Annual Festival of Music was opened in Ahmedabad in 2012.

== Recognition ==
He was honoured by Pandit Jasraj twice (1997 and 2002) on behalf of the Mewati Gharana and was conferred the title of 'Tal Rasik Var'. "Sankalp" central body at Kurukshetra conferred on him the title of 'Sangeet Rushi' in the year 1996. Kumar Club Shastriya Group Ahmedabad also honoured him for rendering outstanding services to the field of classical music. He has been awarded the prestigious 'Gaurav Puraskar' by the Gujarat Sangeet Natak Academy for his outstanding contribution in the field of music in the year 1988. He was also honoured on 'Vishwa Rang – Bhoomi day' for his contribution in the field of music in Vadodara, and by the Medical Association in Ahmedabad. Swar Sadhana Samiti, Mumbai, awarded him 'Swar Sadhana Ratna' in the year 2004. He was also honoured by 'Kala Gurjari' Bhavnagar, Sangeet Kala Niketan, Jaipur. He was also honored by Madhuvan, Bhopal for his contribution in the field of music in the year 2005. He was conferred the title 'Shreshth kala Acharya'. Dr.H.L.Trivedi, Director, Kidney Institute has also honoured him for rendering outstanding services in the field of Classical music and conferred the title 'Bhagwan Mahavir Karuna Sewa Sanman' in 2007. He was awarded "Sangeet Ratna Chudamani" by Divya Jivan Sangh Shivanand Ashram Ahmedabad in 2008 by Naval Kishore Sharma, Governor of Gujarat.

He was awarded Sangeet Natak Akademi Award in 2007.
