= Nagindas Parekh =

Indian language critic (1903–1993)

- Born: Nagindas Narandas Parekh; 8 August 1903; Bulsar (now Valsad), Bombay Presidency
- Died: 19 January 1993 (aged 89); Ahmedabad, Gujarat
- Education: Gujarat Vidyapith; Gujarat College; Visva-Bharati University
- Occupations: literary critic, editor, translator
- Children: 2 children
- Writing career
- Language: Gujarati
- Notable works: Abhinavno Rasavichar ane Bija Lekho (1969); Viksha ane Niriksha (1981)
- Notable awards: Sahitya Akademi Award (1970); Ranjitram Suvarna Chandrak (1990); Sahitya Gaurav Puraskar (1991)

Nagindas Narandas Parekh (8 August 1903 – 19 January 1993) was a Gujarati language critic, editor and translator from India. He is also known by his pen name, Granthkeet (literally, bookworm).

== Life ==
Nagindas Parekh was born on 8 August 1903 in the city of Bulsar (now Valsad), Bombay Presidency, British India. He completed his primary and secondary education in Valsad and graduated from Gujarat Vidyapith university in 1921. From 1921 to 1925, he attended Gujarat College run by the Gujarat Vidyapith where he obtained a degree in Gujarati under Ramnarayan V. Pathak and in Bengali under Indrabhushan Majmudar. Subsequently, he joined Viswa-Bharati at Santiniketan in 1925–26 for higher studies in Bengali. He studied Bengali and the literature of Rabindranath Tagore under Kshitimohan Sen, and then he taught briefly at Gujarat Vidyapith in 1926. He worked with the Navajivan Trust from 1944 to 1947, and later, he taught at B J Vidyabhavan run by the Gujarat Vidhya Sabha. He worked as a professor from 1955 to 1969 at H K Arts College in Ahmedabad. He died on 19 January 1993.

== Works ==
He contributed chiefly in the fields of criticism, biography, editing and translation.

=== Criticism ===
Abhinavno Rasavichar ane Bija Lekho (1969) is a collection of essays. His critical work, Viksha ane Niriksha (1981) includes criticism of eastern as well as western poetry, objective correlative and Croce's philosophy. His other critical works are Parichay ane Pariksha (1968), Swadhyay ane Samiksha (1969), Crocenu Esthetic ane Bija Lekho (Croce's Esthetic, 1972).

=== Biography ===
He wrote the biographies of Navalram (1961), Mahadev Desai (1962), Premanand (1963), and Gandhiji (1964). Saat Charitro (Seven Biographies, 1947) is a collection of short biographies which include Confucius, Tansen, and Dadabhai Naoroji. Sattavan (Fifty Seven, 1938) is a work on the Indian Rebellion of 1857.

=== Editing ===
He edited five works of Mahadev Desai, Vachanmala (1949–1951). He also edited Vishesh Vachanmala (Book 5–6–7), Vartalahari (Part 1-2), and Sahitya Pathavali (Part 1–2–3). All works were later published under the title Gurjar Sahitya Sarita (1962).

=== Translation ===
He heavily contributed to the field of literature by translating many famous works into Gujarati, including several Bengali stories. These include several works of Rabindranath Tagore: Visarjan (1932), Poojarini ane Dakghar (1932), Swadeshi Samaj (1934), Ghare Bahire (1935), Chaturang ane Be Behno (1936), Nauka Doobi (1938), Geetanjali ane Bija Kavyo (1942), Poorva ane Paschim (1942), Vishwaparichay (1944), Laxmini Pariksha (1947), Panchbhoot (1947), Sati (1947). He co-translated some more works of Tagore: Charitryapuja (1950), Ekotershati (1963), Ravindra Nibandhmala -1 (1963), and Ravindranathna Natako -1 (1963). He also translated several works of Sarat Chandra Chattopadhyay including, Pallisamaj (1933), Chandranath (1933), and Parineeta (1931). He translated Teerthsalil (1942) by Dilipkumar Roy, Kavyavichar (1944) by Surendranath Dasgupta, Kavya-Jigyasa (1960) by Atul Chandra Gupta, Na Hanyate (1978) by Maitreyi Devi, Ujala Padchhaya, Kali Bhoy (1964) of Lauha Kumar by Jarasandha, Nyay Dand (1966). He also translated two critical works of Abu Sayeed Ayyub: Kavyama Aadhunikta and Panthjanana Sakha (1977).

He translated several English works including, Kalki athva Sanskritinu Bhavi (1939) by Sarvepalli Radhakrishnan, Rashtrabhashano Sawal (1949) by Jawaharlal Nehru, Sahityavivechanna Siddhanto (1957) by Lascelles Abercrombie, and Sahityama Vivek (1958) by Versefold. He also translated the following three novellas, Nihsantan (1942), Shubh Sandesh (1965) from the New Testament, Gramodhyog Pravritti (Village Industries, 1945) by J. C. Kumarappa. Vama (1947) is a second edition of a previously published story collection titled Chumban ane Biji Vaato with four new stories added and one removed.

He also translated several Sanskrit books: Dhvanyaloka: Anandavardhana no Dhvanivichar (1985), Vakroktijivit by Kuntaka, and Mammat no Kavyavichar (1987).

=== Others ===
Anuvad ni Kala (1958) discusses the specific method of translation and Hindustani Vyakaran Pravesh (1947) is work of Indian grammar.

== Awards ==
He was awarded the prestigious Sahitya Akademi Award in 1970 for his critical work Abhinavno Rasavichar. He received the Ranjitram Suvarna Chandrak award in 1990 and the Sahitya Gaurav Puraskar award in 1991.

== See also ==
- List of Gujarati-language writers
