= Arvachin Kavita =

Poetry survey by Tribhuvandas Luhar (1946)

- Cover page, 2004 ed.
- Author: Tribhuvandas Luhar 'Sundaram';
- Original title: અર્વાચીન કવિતા
- Language: Gujarati
- Subject: Gujarati poetry
- Genre: History of literature
- Publisher: Gujarat Vernacular Society
- Publication date: 1946
- Publication place: India
- Awards: Mahida Prize (1946)
- OCLC: 9732439
- Text: Arvachin Kavita online

Arvachin Kavita (pronounced [ərvɑːtʃiːn kʌvɪtɑ]) is a 1946 critical work by Gujarati writer, poet and critic Tribhuvandas Luhar, pen-name 'Sundaram'. The book offers a historical and critical survey of modern Gujarati poetry from 1845 to 1945.

== Publication history ==
As mentioned in the preface, Sundaram was asked by Gujarat Vernacular Society to write a history of Gujarati poetry written during 1845 to 1945. Sundaram consulted the works of about 350 poets, and out of these he assessed 250 poets and their work in this book. The book was first published in 1946. Its third edition was published in 1965 by Gujarat Vidhya Sabha.

== Content ==
The book presents an outline of the history of modern Gujarati poetry, and deals with the main currents of modern Gujarati poetry as it developed during a period of eighty years (1845–1945). The poems evaluated here are divided into two sections: new current and old current.

The appendix includes information about translations from Sanskrit, English, Bengali, Hindi, Urdu; and about some collection of ghazals, folk-songs and devotional songs, Rasa, patriotic poems and songs. An index of books and authors is given at the end of the book.

== Reception ==
Since its publication, Arvachin Kavita remained as the most significant critical landmark of Gujarati literature. It has been described as 'classic' and 'monumental' work. It was awarded Mahida Prize in 1946.

Gujarati poet and critic Mansukhlal Jhaveri called it 'unique and unparalleled in Gujarati literature'. Chandrakant Topiwala acclaimed the book and wrote that, "...this is a trustworthy historical study of modern Gujarati poetry conducted with close reading and careful analysis of the texts". Babu Suthar, a critic of new generation, noted in one of his articles that Arvachin Kavita is a kind of history that satisfies the conditions of Encyclopedic history and Narrative history.
