= Buddhiprakash =

- Cover page, January 2017 issue
- Current editors: Kumarpal Desai; Rajendra Patel; Subhash Brahmbhatt
- First editor: Dalpatram
- Former editors: Hiralal T. Parekh; Rasiklal Parikh; Umashankar Joshi; K. K. Shastri; Bhogilal Sandesara; Yashvant Shukla; Nagindas Parekh; Hariprasad Shastri; Madhusoodan Parekh; Ramesh Shah
- Categories: Literature, sociology, politics, science
- Frequency: Monthly
- Format: Print
- Publisher: Gujarat Vidya Sabha
- Founded: 1850
- First issue: 15 May 1850; 175 years ago
- Country: India
- Based in: Ahmedabad, Gujarat
- Language: Gujarati
- ISSN: 2347-2448
- OCLC: 6335883

Buddhiprakash (Gujarati: બુદ્ધિપ્રકાશ, English: Light of Knowledge) is a Gujarati language magazine published by Gujarat Vidya Sabha (formerly known as Gujarat Vernacular Society), Ahmedabad, India.

== History ==
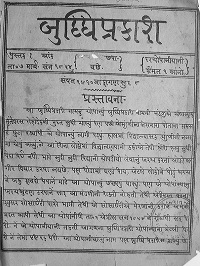
Cover page of issue of 7 March 1854

Buddhiprakash was established in 1850 as a lithotype fortnightly. The first issue of the magazine was published on 15 May 1850 from Ahmedabad. It had 16 pages with articles on 26 subjects ranging from science and technology to philosophy. It cost 1.5 Anna to readers per issue then. After one and a half years of publication, it was closed.

Later, in April 1854, with the help of Rao Bahadur Bhogilal Pranvallabhdas and under the guidance of T. B. Curtis, the headmaster of the Ahmedabad English school, it resumed publication. In 1855, on request of Alexander Kinloch Forbes, Dalpatram accepted to serve as the editor of the magazine and edited it until 1879. Later it was edited by Hiralal T. Parekh, Rasiklal Parikh, Umashankar Joshi, K. K. Shastri, Bhogilal Sandesara, Yashvant Shukla, Nagindas Parekh, Hariprasad Shastri, Madhusoodan Parekh and Ramesh Shah. Currently, the editors are Kumarpal Desai, Rajendra Patel and Subhash Brahmbhatt.

== Content ==
Buddhiprakash was the leading magazine in the social reform era of Gujarat in the 19th century, advocating reforms in variety of fields. Apart from literature, it published articles in sociology, politics, religion, philosophy, zoology, botany, archeology, history, geography and economics. It occasionally published special issues. Dalpatram's work Dalpatpingal based on poetic metres was serialized in this magazine from 1855 to 1860.

== See also ==
- List of Gujarati-language magazines
