= Sundaram (writer) =

Gujarati writer (1908–1991)

- Born: Tribhuvandas Purushottamdas Luhar; 22 March 1908; Bharuch, Bombay Presidency, India
- Died: 13 January 1991 (aged 82)
- Occupations: Poet; short story writer; literary critic; translator
- Writing career
- Notable work: Arvachin Kavita (1946)
- Notable awards: Ranjitram Suvarna Chandrak (1934); Narmad Suvarna Chandrak (1955); Sahitya Akademi Award (1968); Padma Bhushan (1985)

Tribhuvandas Purushottamdas Luhar, better known by his pen name Sundaram (22 March 1908 – 13 January 1991), was a Gujarati poet, short story writer, literary critic and translator from India. He received the 1968 Sahitya Akademi Award for his critical work Avalokana.

== Life ==
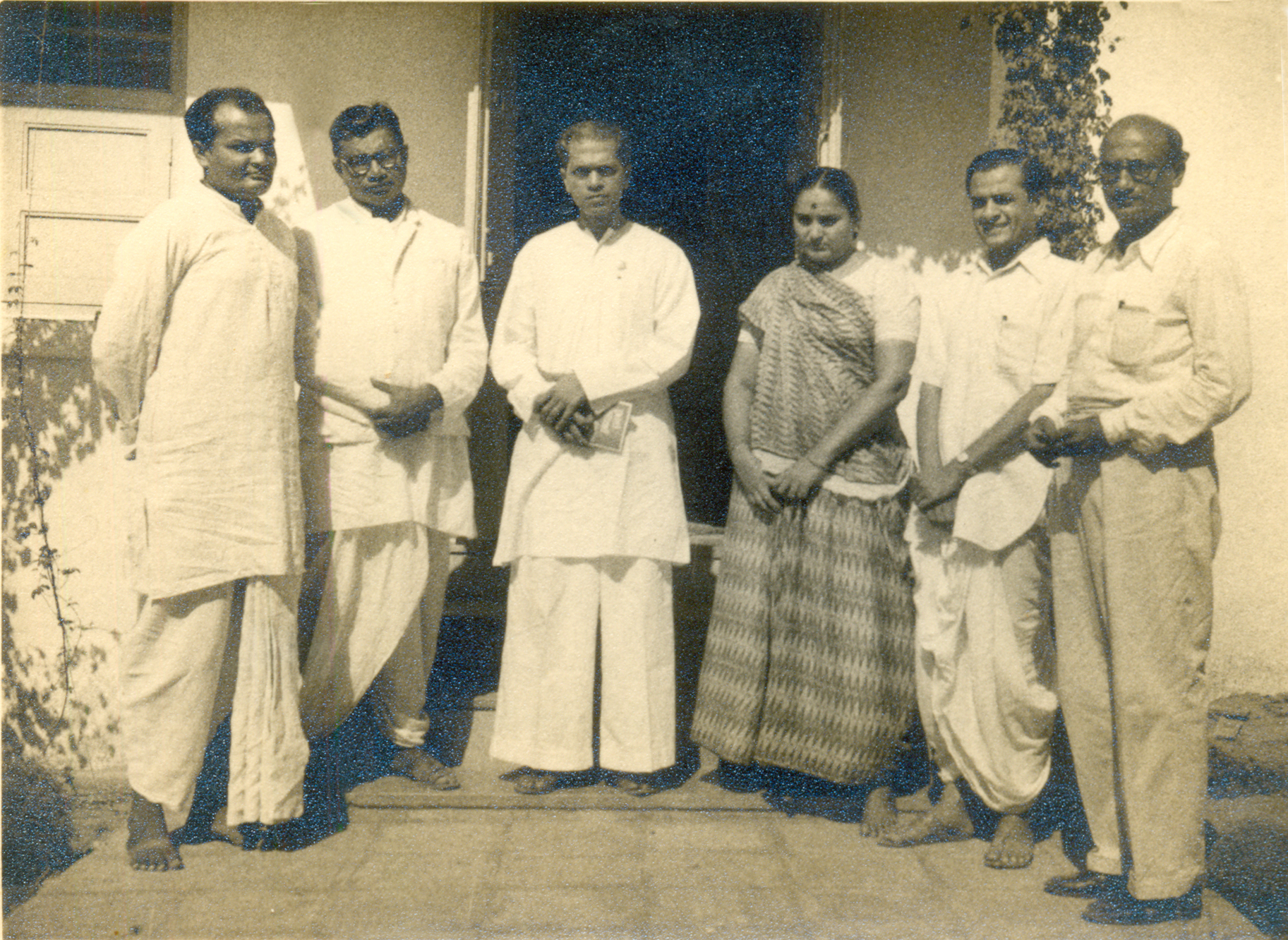
Sundaram in center; from left to second is Jaybhikhkhu and from right to second is Dhirubhai Thaker

He was born on 22 March 1908 at Miyan Matar, Bharuch, Bombay Presidency, British India. He completed his primary education in local school of Matar and five grades in English medium at Amod, Gujarat. Later he studied at Chhotubhai Purani's Rashtriya New English School, Bharuch. He graduated in languages from Gujarat Vidyapith, Ahmedabad in 1929. He started teaching in Gurukul at Songadh. He participated in Indian independence movement and was imprisoned for some time. He was associated with Jyotisangh, the women's organisation in Ahmedabad, from 1935 to 1945. He was introduced to Sri Aurobindo in 1945, and he moved to Pondicherry. He presided over Gujarati Sahitya Parishad in 1970. He died on 13 January 1991.

== Works ==
Though he started with poetry, he successfully ventured into other field of literature. His poetry and prose both are imaginative, intense and full of brilliance. His works have also spiritual as well as social elements. His transition from different philosophical phases; progressivism, communism, Gandhian philosophy and self realisation philosophy of Aurobindo; are evident in his works.

=== Poetry ===
He started writing poetry in 1926 under pen name, 'Marichi' and 'Ekansh De' was his first poem followed by more poems under pen name, 'Vishwakarma'. He published his poem Bardoline in 1928 under pen name, 'Sundaram' and adopted it for lifetime.

Koya Bhagatni Kadvi Vaani ane Garibo na Geeto (lit. Bitter tongue of Koya Bhagat and Songs of the Poor) (1933) was his first poetry collection followed by Kavyamangala (lit. Auspicious Poems) (1933). He published another collection Vasudha (1939) and the collection of children's poetry, Rang Rang Vadaliya (1939). His Yatra (lit. The Journey) (1951) is influenced by the philosophy of Aurobindo.

=== Short stories ===
Under pen name, 'Trishul', he published the short story collections. They are Hirakani ane Bijee Vatu (1938), Piyasi (1940), Unnayan (1945, republished Kholki and Nagarika with more stories), Tarini (1978), Pavakna Panthe (1978).

=== Criticism ===
Arvachin Kavita (1946) is a literary criticism of Gujarati poetry from 1845 to 1945. Avalokana is his another work of criticism while Sahitya Chintan (1978) is a collection of articles on principles of literary criticism.

=== Other ===
Vasanti Poornima (1977) is a collection of one-act plays. Dakshinayan (1942) is a travelogue of his travel of South India. Chidambara is his memoir while Samarchana is an anthology of articles about his view of life. He also wrote Saavidya (1978). Sri Arvind Mahayogi (1950) is a short biography of Sri Aurobindo. He translated several Sanskrit, Hindi and English works into Gujarati. They include Bhagvajjukiyam (1940), Mṛcchakatika (1944), Kaya Palat (1961), Janata ane Jan (1965), Aisi hai Zindagi ane some writings of Aurobindo and The Mother.

He edited the magazines Dakshina and Baldakshina published by Sri Aurobindo Ashram.

== Awards ==
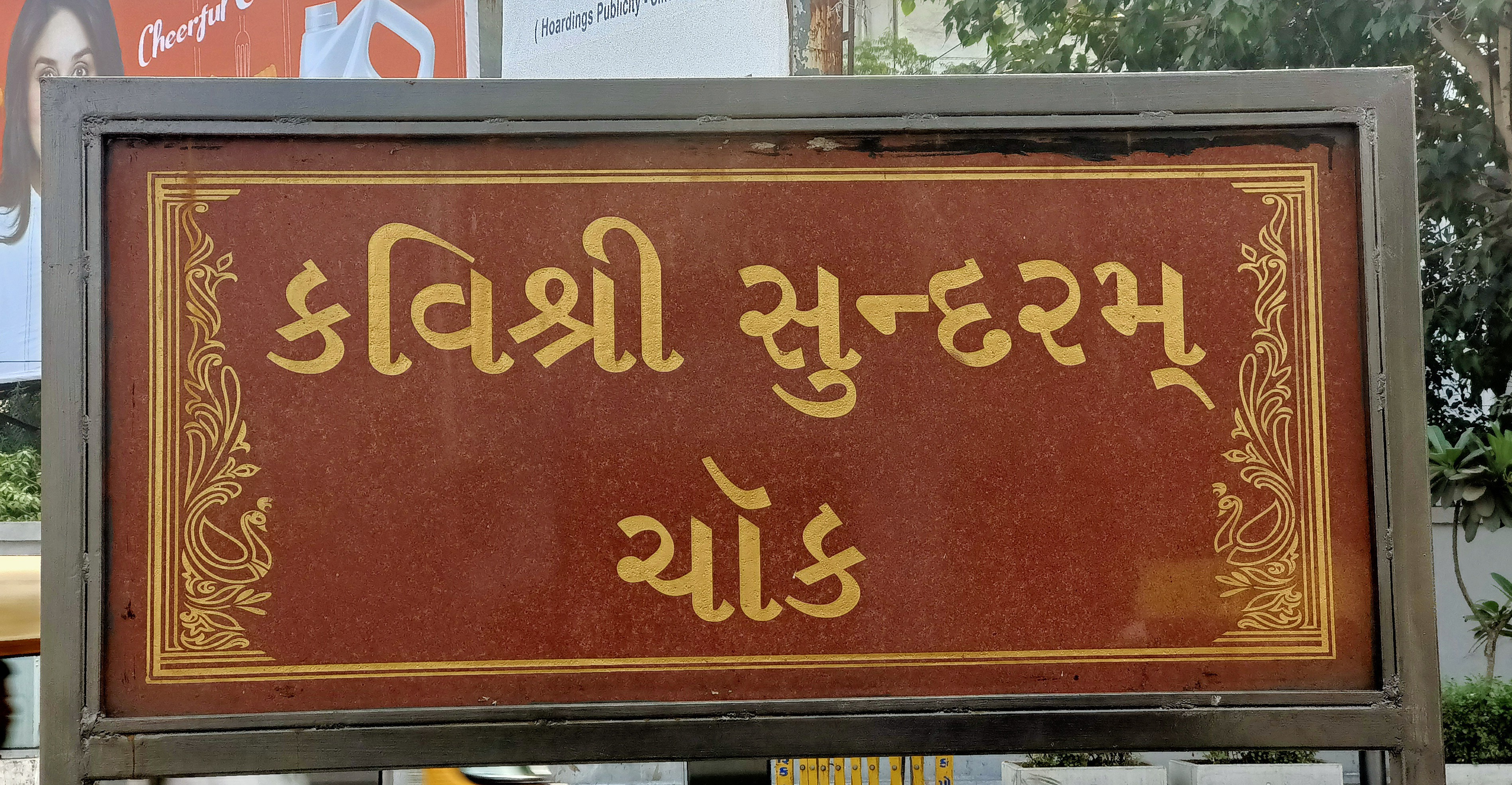
Kavishri Sundaram Chowk in Ahmedabad, Gujarat

He was awarded the Ranjitram Suvarna Chandrak in 1934 for Kavyamangala. He received the Narmad Suvarna Chandrak in 1955 for his poetry collection Yatra and Mahida Prize in 1946 for criticism. He received the 1968 Sahitya Akademi Award for his book Avalokana. He was awarded the Padma Bhushan, the third-highest civilian award, in 1985.

== See also ==
- List of Gujarati-language writers
