= Saptak Annual Festival of Music =

Saptak Annual Music Festival
- Genre: Indian classical music (Hindustani, Carnatic, Ghazals etc.)
- Dates: 1–13 January
- Locations: Ahmedabad, India
- Years active: 1980–present
- Founders: Nandan Mehta; Manju Mehta; Rupande Shah; Bharti Parikh; D.D.Trivedi; Hetal Mehta
- Website: Saptak

The Saptak Annual Festival of Music is an annual thirteen-day Indian classical music festival held in Ahmedabad, India. It is organised by Saptak School of Music and takes place January first to the thirteenth every year, and is attended by hundreds of people.

== History ==
The festival started in 1980 by Nandan Mehta and his wife Manju Mehta, Rupande Shah, Bharti Parikh and D.D. Trivedi, with the inauguration by Pandit Ravi Shankar and Pandit Kishan Maharaj. The one-day event in 1980 expanded to the performance of more than 130 musicians in 15 sessions spread across 13 days by 2010.

The festival features both emerging talents and established performers. Besides pure classical music, it also includes performances of folk music, classical dance forms, and semi-classical forms such as thumri.

== Gallery ==
The gallery dedicated to the life of Nandan Mehta and the history of festival was opened in Ahmedabad in 2012.

== See also ==
- List of Indian classical music festivals
