= Bhalan =

Gujarati Poet

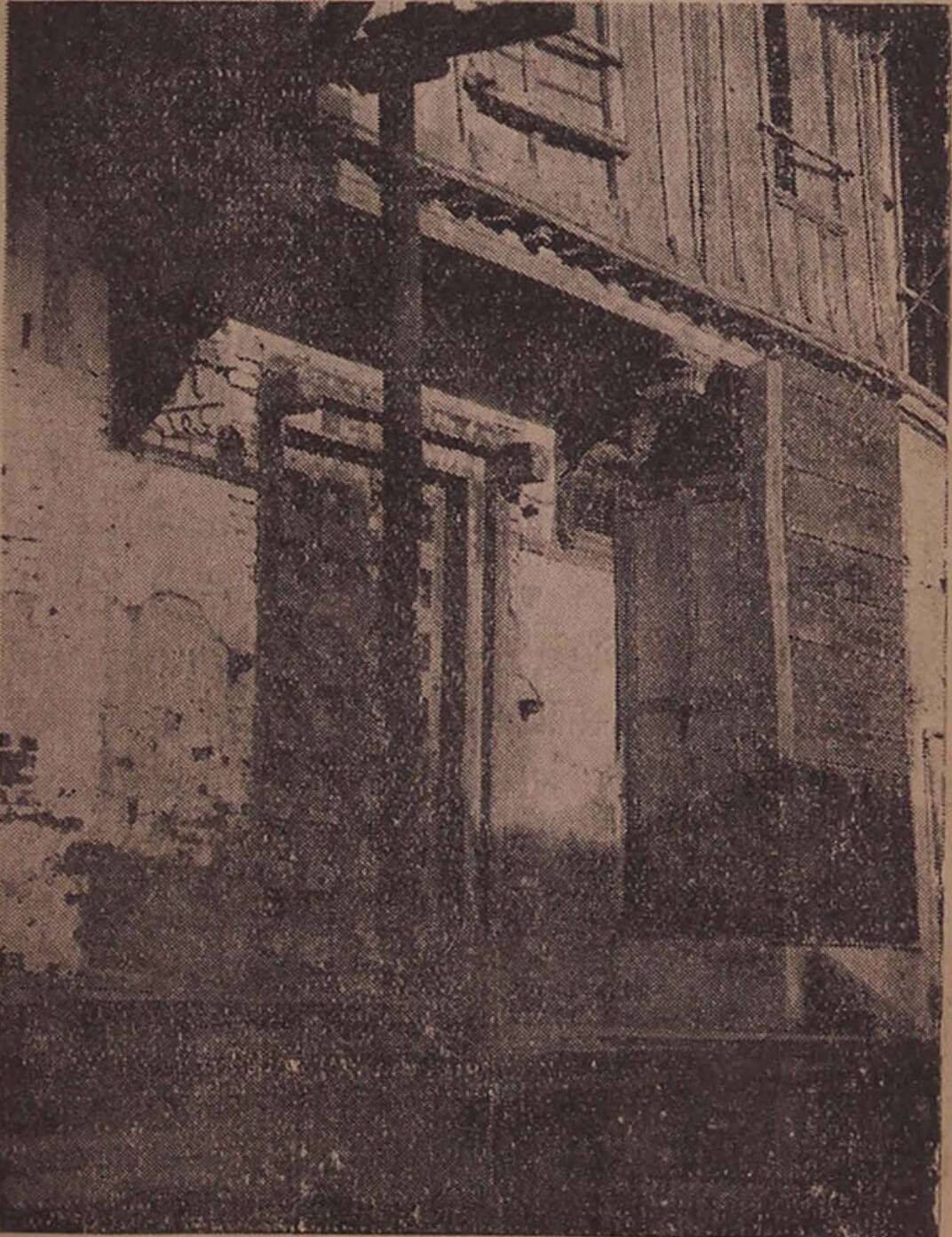
Bhalan's house in Patan

Bhalan (b. 15th century in Patan in the present-day Gujarat state in India), was a famous Gujarati poet of the medieval period. Also a scholar of Sanskrit literature, he is considered a major contributor in Bhakti-kal in Gujarati literature.

== Works ==
According to Narsinhrao Divatia, his best works are Kadambari and Nalakhyan. Kadambari is an abridged Gujarati rendering of Banabhatta's well-known Sanskrit prose work Kadambari in verse. He extracted the pulp from the Puranas and converted it into various significant works, which include Nalakhyan, Shiv-Bhiladi Samvad, Durvasa Akhyan, Mrugi Akhyan, Jalandhar Akhyan, Mamaki Akhyan, Chandi Akhyan and Dhruv Akhyan. He was an exponent of the genres of the Akhyana and Kavita in Gujarati literature.

Bhalan also wrote the poems Ram Balacharita and Krishna Balacharita, which describe the depth of the childness of both gods. Bhalan was the first Gujarati writer to use the word, Gujarabhasha (Gujarati language) in his Nalakhyan to describe the language of his poem.
