= Ushnas =

Indian poet (1920-2011)

- Born: Natwarlal Kuberdas Pandya; 28 September 1920; Savli village near Vadodara, Gujarat, India
- Died: 6 November 2011 (aged 91); Valsad, Gujarat
- Occupation: poet
- Writing career
- Language: Gujarati
- Notable work: Trun No Grah (1964); Ashwattha (1975)
- Notable awards: Narmad Suvarna Chandrak (1963); Ranjitram Suvarna Chandrak (1972); Sahitya Akademi Award (1976)

Natwarlal Kuberdas Pandya (28 September 1920 – 6 November 2011), better known by his pen name, Ushnas (Gujarati: ઉશનસ્), was an Indian Gujarati-language poet from Gujarat, India. He received the 1976 Sahitya Akademi Award for his poetry collection Ashwattha.

== Biography ==
He was born in Savli village near Vadodara on 28 September 1920. He studied in Mehsana, Sidhpur, Savli and Dabhoi. He completed his Bachelor of Arts with Sanskrit in 1942 and Masters in Gujarati in 1945 from Maharaja Sayajirao University of Baroda. He taught at Rosery Highschool and Garda College in Navsari. He also taught at J P Shroff Arts College in Valsad. He also served as a president of Gujarati Adhyapak Sangh (Gujarati Teachers Union) in 1979. He also served as a president of Gujarati Sahitya Parishad from 1991 to 1993.

He died on 6 November 2011 at Valsad, Gujarat.

== Works ==
Prasoon was his first collection of poems published in 1955. Other collections include Nepathye (1956), Aardra (1959), Manomudra (1960), Trun No Grah (1964), Spand ane Chhand (1968), Kinkini (1971), Bharat Darshan (1974), Ashwattha (1975), Rupana Lay (1976), Vyakul Vaishnav (1977), Pruthvine Paschim Chahere (1979) and Shishulok (1984). Valavi, Ba Avi and Sadmatano Khancho are his story and poetry compilations. He also wrote plays such as Pantuji, Doshini Vahu and Trun No Grah.

== Awards ==
He received Kumar Chandrak in 1959, Narmad Suvarna Chandrak in 1963 and Gujarat Gaurav Award. He also received Ranjitram Suvarna Chandrak, the highest award in Gujarati literature, in 1972. He was awarded Sahitya Akademi Award for his poetry collection Ashwattha in 1976.

The Ushnas Prize is named after him.

== See also ==
- List of Gujarati-language writers
