= Kuntaka =

Sanskrit poetician and literary theorist

Kuntaka (Sanskrit: कुन्तक) was a Sanskrit poetician and literary theorist of who is remembered for his work Vakroktijīvitam in which he postulates the Vakrokti Siddhānta or theory of Oblique Expression, which he considers as the hallmark of all creative literature. He lived roughly 950–1050, between Anandavardhana in the ninth century and Abhinavagupta in the tenth century and was a rough contemporary of Dhananjaya and Rajasekhara.

== His theory ==
Vakrokti, emanating from the creative faculty of the poet endows poetic language with strikingness[Vaicitrya] and causes aesthetic delight to the reader. Etymologically, the word Vakrokti consists of two components - 'vakra' and 'ukti'. The first component means 'crooked, indirect or unique' and the second means 'poetic expression or speech'.

== Types of Vakrokti ==
It is manifested at six levels in language, viz. the phonetic level, [varṇavinyāsa], the lexical level [padapūrvārddha], the grammatical level [padaparārddha], the sentential level [vākya], the contextual level [prakaraṇa] and finally the compositional level [prabandha]. Kuntaka anticipates much of the modern stylistic approach to literature and his stylistics encompasses imaginative language at the micro and macro levels. The conscious choices made by the poet in the language is a fertile field of investigation in his approach. It is the considered view of Kuntaka that poetic language always deviates from hackeneyed expressions by its imaginative turns. Kuntaka avers that the stamp of originality of a great author will be present even in the title of the work of art.
