= Chhinnapatra =

1965 Gujarati novel by Suresh Joshi

- Cover page of English translation, 1998
- Author: Suresh Joshi
- Original title: છિન્નપત્ર
- Translator: Tridip Suhrud
- Cover artist: Bhupen Khakhar
- Language: Gujarati
- Genre: Lyrical novel
- Publisher: Parshva Publication (Gujarati ed.), Macmillan India (English ed.)
- Publication date: 1965
- Publication place: India
- English publication date: 1998
- Media type: Print
- Pages: 122 pages (Gujarati ed.); 83 pages (English ed.)
- ISBN: 978-0-333-93188-2 Eng. ed.
- OCLC: 41532391
- Dewey Decimal: 891.473
- LC Class: PK1859.J593
- Followed by: Maranottar (1973)
- Text: Chhinnapatra online

Chhinnapatra (Gujarati: છિન્નપત્ર, English: Crumpled letter) is a 1965 Gujarati novel by Suresh Joshi. The novel is composed in the form of letters written by protagonist Ajay, a creative writer. Considered to be a lyrical novel, it uses stream of consciousness technique.

== Background ==
Joshi published Chhinnnapatra in 1965. In its wake, Shrikant Shah, Madhu Rye, Chandrakant Bakshi, Radheshyam Sharma and Mukund Parikh published their experimental novels Asti (1966), Chahera (1966), Paralysis (1967), Fero (1968) and Mahabhinishkraman (1968) respectively. The first edition of the novel was published with the subtitle 'a rough draft of an intended novel' but it was dropped from the second edition.

== Synopsis ==
Ajay, the protagonist, is a creative writer with a deep sensitivity, and loves Mala. Mala's friend Lila loves Ajay. There are other young men Amal, Arun, Ashok aspiring for the hands of Mala. After the death of Ajay, Mala found a diary written by Ajay. Mala passed through the diary during the train journey.

The novel is divided into two sections: the first section contains the diary of Ajay and it uses first-person narrative technique, while the second part is an epilogue written with omniscient point of view with Mala as the protagonist.

== Theme and style ==
Joshi clarified in an interview that we long for love in the world we live in. But the system of the world makes love impossible and that is the theme of this novel.

Chhinnapatra literally means the "torn pages" in Gujarati. As the title indicates, this is a collection of the torn pages of a scrapbook. Contains fifty pages, the scrapbook belongs to Ajay who has written it. The inner reality of his being is presented here through his understanding of himself, his love for Mala, and a few other persons. The complexity of his love, the nuances of his emotion, the pangs of his agony are all depicted here with the help of images and symbols. The appendix of scrapbook explains past as a flashback and ends novel. Joshi intended to present the complex state of minds of his characters and hence, as critic Shirish Panchal noted, it becomes a lyrical novel full of poetic images and symbolic allusions.

== Reception and criticism ==
Chhinnapatra was translated into English as Crumpled Letter by Tridip Suhrud in 1998.

Joshi has himself considered it as a "a draft of novel" instead of novel. So it rejects conventional canon of novel writing. Two of the critics have said that the depiction of the characters in this novel is 'phenomenological'. Shirish Panchal wrote that, among Joshi's longer works of fiction Chhinnapatra deserves a special mention. He added that with Chhinnapatra, Joshi endeavored to take Gujarati novel away from stagnancy and self-complacency. Aniruddh Brahmabhatt wrote that, this type of modern novel has negated the age old concept that a novel can't survive out of its social milieu. K. M. George considers it as an intended anti-novel which ended up only as an experiment difficult to read or comprehend.
