= Sharifa Vijaliwala =

Indian critic and translator (Born: 1962)

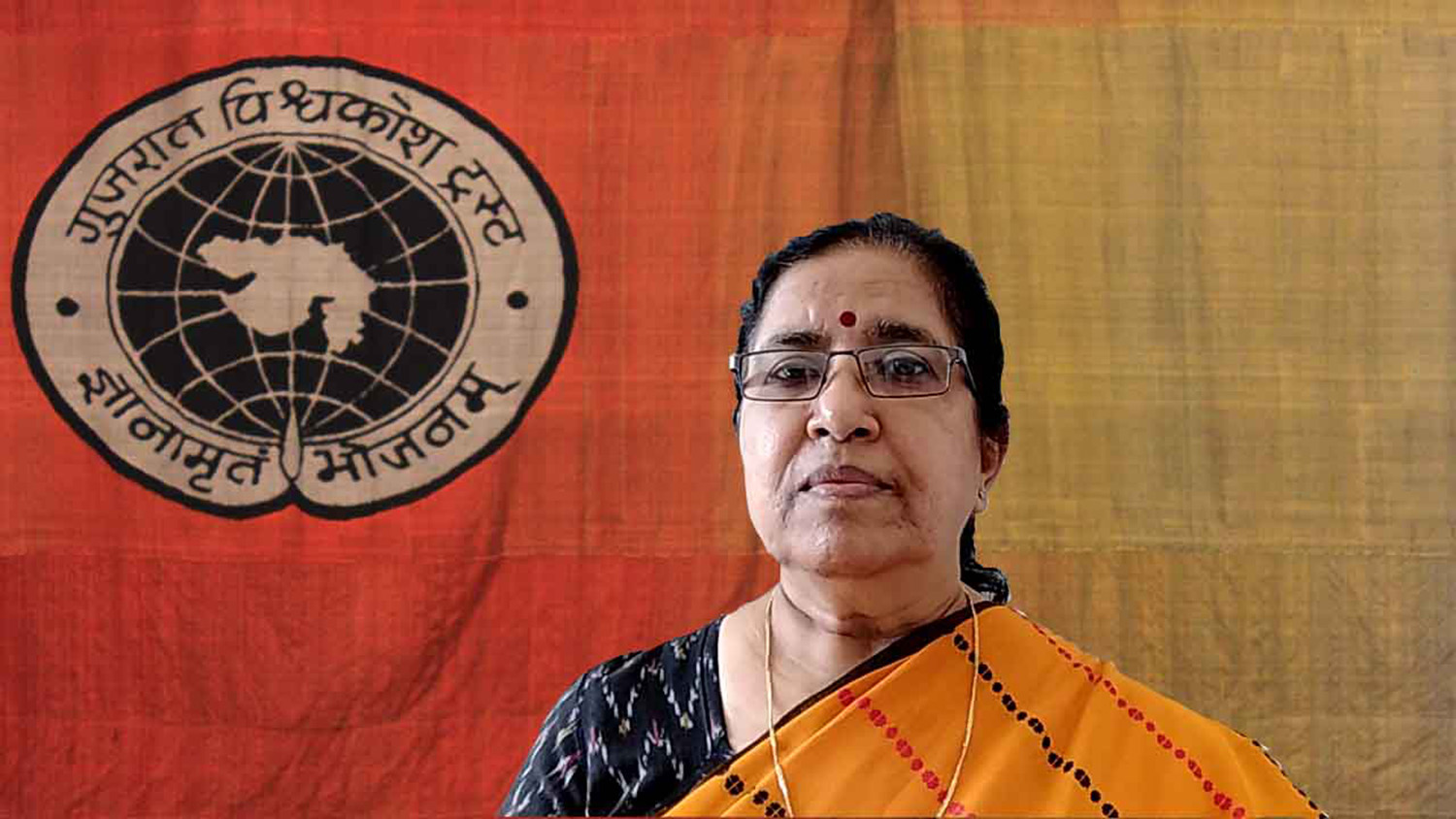
- Vijaliwala at Gujarati Vishwakosh Trust, January 2022
- Born: Sharifa Kasambhai Vijaliwala; 4 August 1962 (age 64); Amargadh, Bhavnagar, Gujarat, India
- Education: Bachelor of Pharmacy; Master of Arts; Ph.D
- Alma mater: Maharaja Sayajirao University of Baroda
- Occupations: Editor, critic, translator and character sketch writer
- Writing career
- Language: Gujarati
- Years active: 1991 – present
- Notable works: Jene Lahor Nathi Joyu E Janmyo J Nathi (2011); Vibhajan ni Vyatha (2014)
- Notable awards: Sahitya Akademi Award (2018); Gujarat Sahitya Akademi award

Academic background
- Thesis: Point of View in Short Stories : A Critical Study with Particular Reference to Some Gujarati Short Stories (1994)
- Doctoral advisor: Shirish Panchal

Sharifa Vijaliwala (born 4 August 1962) is an Indian Gujarati language writer, critic, translator and editor from Surat, Gujarat, India. She is a recipient of a 2018 Sahitya Akademi Award for Vibhajanni Vyatha, a collection of critical essays in Gujarati, and has won several Gujarat Sahitya Akademi awards for her literary work.

== Biography ==
Sharifa Vijliwala was born to her parents, Kasambhai and Hajaraben, on 4 August 1962 in Amargadh, a village in Shihor, in the Bhavnagar district of Gujarat, India. She completed her primary education there, and passed her secondary and higher secondary board exams in 1978 and 1981 respectively. In 1985, she graduated from the Faculty of Technology and Engineering, at the Maharaja Sayajirao University of Baroda earning a Bachelor of Pharmacy degree. She worked as a pharmacist for five years. Because of her interest in literature, she had also joined the university's Gujarati department to study Gujarati literature in 1986. In 1990, she secured the first rank in the university and completed post graduation with a Kantawala Gold Medal. During her literature studies, she passed the National Eligibility Test (UGC NET) examination and secured a Junior Research Fellowship. In 1994, under the guidance of Shirish Panchal, she researched narratology. Vijliwala received a PhD for her dissertation Point of View in Short Stories: A Critical Study with Particular Reference to Some Gujarati Short Stories. She taught Gujarati literature at the M.T.B. Arts College, Surat from 1991 to 2013. Since 2013, Vijliwala has been a professor and head at the Department of Gujarati, at Veer Narmad South Gujarat University in Surat.

== Works ==
Vijliwala is a translator, critic and editor. She wrote her first article "Mara Bapu", published in Pitrutarpan compiled by Joseph Macwan in 1988. Her first work of criticism wasTunki Vartama Kathankendra which was also her doctoral research. Varatasandarbh, Sampratyay, Naval Vishv and Vibhajanni Vyatha are her other collections of criticism.

She has translated several literary works. She began literary translation in 1994 translating the best short stories of western literature. Ananya (15 foreign stories), Anusang (10 foreign stories), Tran Katha (Stories of Stefan Zweig), Vachan (Kannada Vachanas, co-translator), Gandhi ni Kedie (A brief translation of Sarla Behn's Autobiography) are her translations. She has made a significant contribution as a translator of literature based on the Partition of India. Her translations of Partition-oriented literature include Manto ni Vartao (22 Urdu stories by Saadat Hasan Manto), Vibhajan ni Vartao (Indian stories based on the Partition), Intizar Husain ni Vartao (18 Urdu stories by Intizar Hussain) Jene lahor Nathi Joyu E Janmyo J Nathi (A play by Asghar Wajahat), Sukato Vad (Manzoor Ahtesham's Hindi novel), Pinjar (A novel by Amrita Pritam), Basti (Intizar Hussain's Urdu novel), Adha Gaon (A novel by Rahi Masoom Raza) and Mahabhoj (Mannu Bhandari's political novel). She has also translated Kabira Khada Bazar Mein (A play by Bhisham Sahni) and Natsamrat (A play by V. V. Shirvadkar).

In addition to her translation work, She completed a research project Analytical and Comparative Study of Literature Based on Partition Theme funded by the University Grants Commission (UGC) of New Delhi. Himanshi Shelat, a renowned Gujarati author, said that, "without losing the flavour of the source language the translated works of Sharifa Vijaliwala aim to preserve the lucidity of the target language. She works diligently to achieve the high standards of excellence in her translations."

She has edited more than 20 books including: Bani Vatu(1999) (A compilation of folk stories), Bakulesh ni Vartao (2004), 2000 ni Vartao, Shatrupa (2005) (A compilation of feminist Gujarati short stories), Jayant Khatri ni Gadhyasrushti (2009), Jayant Khatri no Vartavaibhav (2010), Varta Vishesh : Harish Nagrecha (2010), Varta Vishesh : Saroj Pathak (2012), Varta Vishesh : Himanshi Shelat (2012), Ratilal Anil na Uttam Chandrana (2014), Vibhajan ni Gujarati Vartao (2018), Himanshi Shelat Adhyayan Granth (2018), Bhagwatikumar Sharma no Varta Vaibhav (2019), Shirish Panchal Adhyayan Granth (2020), Umashankar Joshi no Varta Vaibhav (2020), Pannalal Patel no Varta Vishesh (2020), Meghni no Varta Vaibhav (2021), Varsha Adalja no Varta Vaibhav (2021), Ghanshyam Desai no Varta Vaibhav (2023), Mohan Parmar no Varta Vaibhav (2023), Chunilal Madia no Varta Vaibhav (2024), Eva Dave no Varta Vaibhav (2024), Ishwar Petlikar no Varta Vaibhav (2025), Kundanika Kapadia no Varta Vaibhav (2025), Ismat Chughtai ni Vartao (2026) and Panna Nayak ni Vartasrusthi (2026).

Sammukh and Vyatha ni Katha (Note: interviews with victims of the Partition of India) are a compilation of her interviews. Sambandho nu Aakash is her collection of reminiscences. Her other works include Manto ni Vartasrushti – Introduction Booklet (2002), Komi Samasya ni Bhitarma (2010) (A brief introduction of "The communal triangle in India" by Achyut Patwardhan and Asoka Mehta) and Harmony (2018).

== Awards and recognition ==
Vijliwala has received many educational and literary awards. In 1988, she received the Pranjivan Charitable Trust Prize (State Level). She secured the first rank in the university and completed post graduation with a Kantawala Gold Medal. Her contributions to the field of literary criticism and translation have been recognised by the Gujarat Sahitya Akademi. Ananya (2000), Ba Ni Vatun (2000), Varta Sandarbh (2002), Sampratyay (2003) and Manto ni Vartao (2003) have received a Gujarat Sahitya Akademi Award. A research paper by Vijaliwala, The Study of Some Stories through Feministic Point of View in Gujarati Language, was awarded the Best Research Paper Award by the Bhaikaka Inter-University Trust (1998–99). Her PhD thesis, Point of View in Short Stories, was awarded the Ramanlal Joshi Critic Award (2002) by Gujarati Sahitya Parishad. She was awarded the 2015 Sahitya Akademi Translation Prize for her translation Jene Lahor Nathi Joyu E Janmyo J Nathi and 2018 Sahitya Akademi Award for Vibhajanni Vyatha, a collection of critical essays in Gujarati based on the partition of India. She has also received Soham Award (2016) by Navneet Samarpan, Bharatiya Vidya Bhavan and Sadbhavana Puraskar (2017) by the Sadbhavana Trust, Mahuva.

== See also ==
- List of Gujarati-language writers

== Note ==
Awards
Preceded by Urmi Desai	Recipient of the Sahitya Akademi Award winners for Gujarati; 2018	Succeeded by Ratilal Borisagar
