= Grihapravesh =

Grihapravesha is a Hindu ceremony performed on the occasion of an individual's first time entering their new home, a housewarming.

It may also refer to:

- Grihapravesh (book), a 1957 Indian Gujarati-language short story collection by Suresh Joshi
- Grihapravesh (1954 film), an Indian Bengali-language film by Ajoy Kar
- Grihapravesh (2025 film), an Indian Bengali language film
- Gruhapravesam (1976 film), an Indian Tamil-language film
- Griha Pravesh (1979 film), an Indian Hindi-language film
- Gruha Pravesam (1982 film), an Indian Telugu-language film by Bairisetty Bhaskara Rao
- Gruhapravesha, a 1991 Indian Kannada-language film
- Grihaprevesam, a 1992 Indian Malayalam-language film directed by Mohan Kupleri
