= Pravesh =

Pravesh can be a masculine given name or a middle name. Notable people with the name include:

- Pravesh Kumar, UK-based director and writer
- Pravesh Mallick, Indian composer and singer
- Pravesh Ratn, Indian politician
- Pravesh Wahi, Indian politician
- Ram Pravesh Rai, Indian politician

== See also ==
- Parvesh, masculine given name
- Pravessh Rana, Indian actor, television host, and model
- Grihapravesh (disambiguation)
