= Janantike =

1965 collection of essays by Suresh Joshi

- Cover page
- Author: Suresh Joshi
- Original title: જનાન્તિકે
- Translator: V. Y. Kantak
- Language: Gujarati
- Genre: Personal essays
- Publisher: Swati Prakashan, Bombay (Gujarati); Sahitya Akademi, New Delhi (English)
- Publication date: 1965
- Publication place: India
- English publication date: 1995
- Awards: Narmad Suvarna Chandrak
- OCLC: 34851277
- Text: Janantike online

Janantike (pronounced [jənantike]; transl. To The Audience—An Aside) is a 1965 collection of personal essays by Indian writer Suresh Joshi. V.Y. Kantak translated it into English with the title Intimate Asides (1995).

== Publication ==
The book was first published in 1965 by Swati Prakashan, Bombay. It contains 51 essays that Joshi wrote during the period from 1955 to 1964. The essays are of different lengths, arranged in a loose sequence. The essays are untitled but numbered serially.

== Contents ==
Janantike (aside) is a term used in classical Sanskrit dramaturgy to indicate a situation where one character whispers something into the ear of another character, apparently excluding the audience from sharing it. Joshi states in the preface to the collection that the essays are written in a Janantik form, suggesting they are personal essays.

Some essays in the collection are autobiographical in nature. The chief theme of the essays is reminiscence (smaraṇ in Gujarati). In the opening essays, as well as in some later ones, Joshi recaptures the impressions of his earlier days, especially his childhood. He writes about his childhood impressions of his home region which lies towards the South Gujarat, the castle which is now in ruins, the dense forest of Saatkashi, the river Zankhari and the wondrous fairy world of childhood. Some specific memories are interwoven with these past impressions: the memory of certain deaths in the family, the images of a grandfather and an aunt are overlaid with the sadness of existence.

== Reception ==
Janantike was awarded the Narmad Suvarna Chandrak (also known as the Narmad Gold Medal) literary award in 1965. One of Joshi's best known works, Janantike is considered to be one of the important contributions to Gujarati essays. V.Y. Kantak translated it into English by V. Y. Kantak with the title Intimate Asides (1995), published by Sahitya Akademi.

Gujarati writer Meghnad Bhatt cites Janantike as 'undoubtedly' the best collection of essays in Gujarati literature. Because of the 'rare modern sensibility' of the essays, critic Digish Mehta consider it a 'significant contribution' to Gujarati prose style.
