= Housewarming party =

Type of social gathering

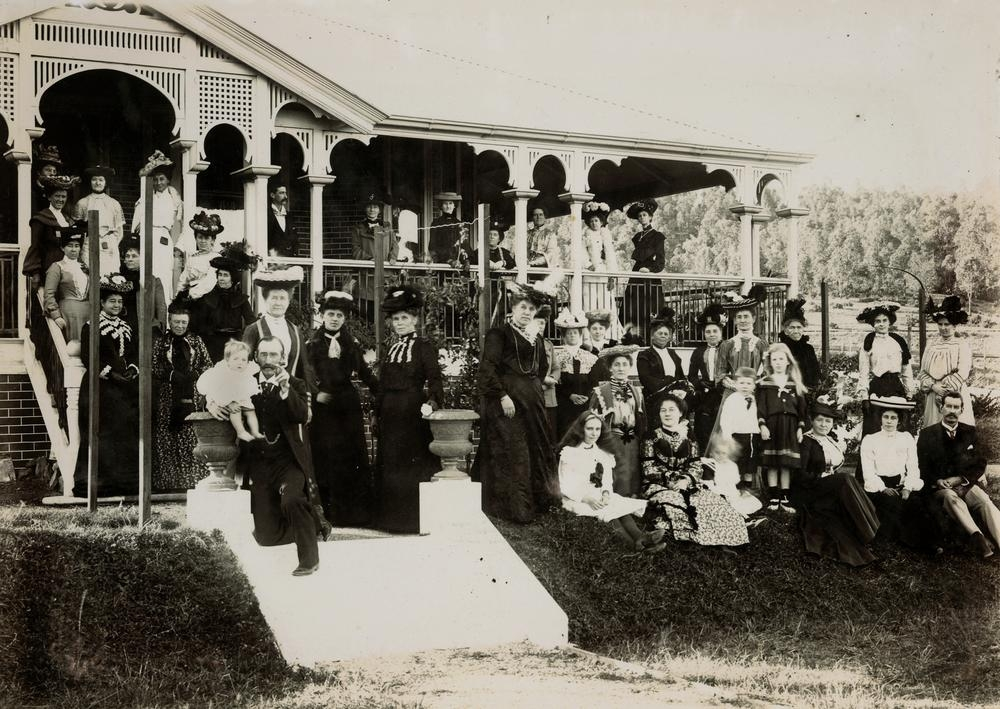
Housewarming party in Australia.

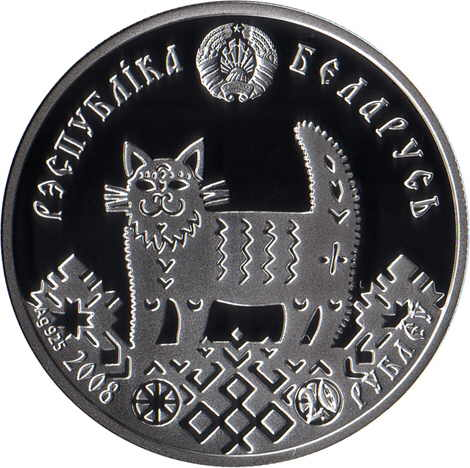
Belarusian coin Navasielle. A tradition in Belarus is to let the cat into the house first.

A housewarming party is a party traditionally held soon after moving into a new residence. The hosts present their new home to their friends, post-moving, and for friends to give gifts to furnish the new home. House-warming parties are generally informal.

== History ==
The English term "housewarming" literally comes from the act of warming a new house, in the days before central heating. Each guest would bring firewood as a gift and build fires in all available fireplaces. Aside from warming the house, this was believed to repel evil spirits by creating a protective atmosphere of warmth. Uninhabited houses were considered targets for vagrant spirits, and therefore houses were believed to require cleansing before they were safe to be occupied by young children. The origin is from the medieval times.

== Gifts ==
- The exchange of bread and salt as a sign of hospitality is common in many cultures. Giving bread and salt as a housewarming gift was popular in Russia and Germany and is a feature of Jewish housewarming traditions.
- In Greece, the pomegranate was a traditional housewarming gift. It would be placed under or near the domestic altar of the house to bring good luck, fertility and abundance. While the pomegranate was considered the fruit of the dead, it also had strong connections to marriage and wealth and featured in the myth of Persephone.
- In the 17th and 18th centuries, pineapples were considered an elaborate and extravagant housewarming gift throughout Europe and America. The tradition began as a means of displaying the wealth and connections of the gift giver as pineapples were associated with the welcoming hospitality of indigenous Caribbean peoples shown to Imperial travellers.
- Amongst the Karakalpaks of Northwestern Uzbekistan, guests at a housewarming would bring gifts of cloth when they moved into a new yurt.

== Regional variations ==
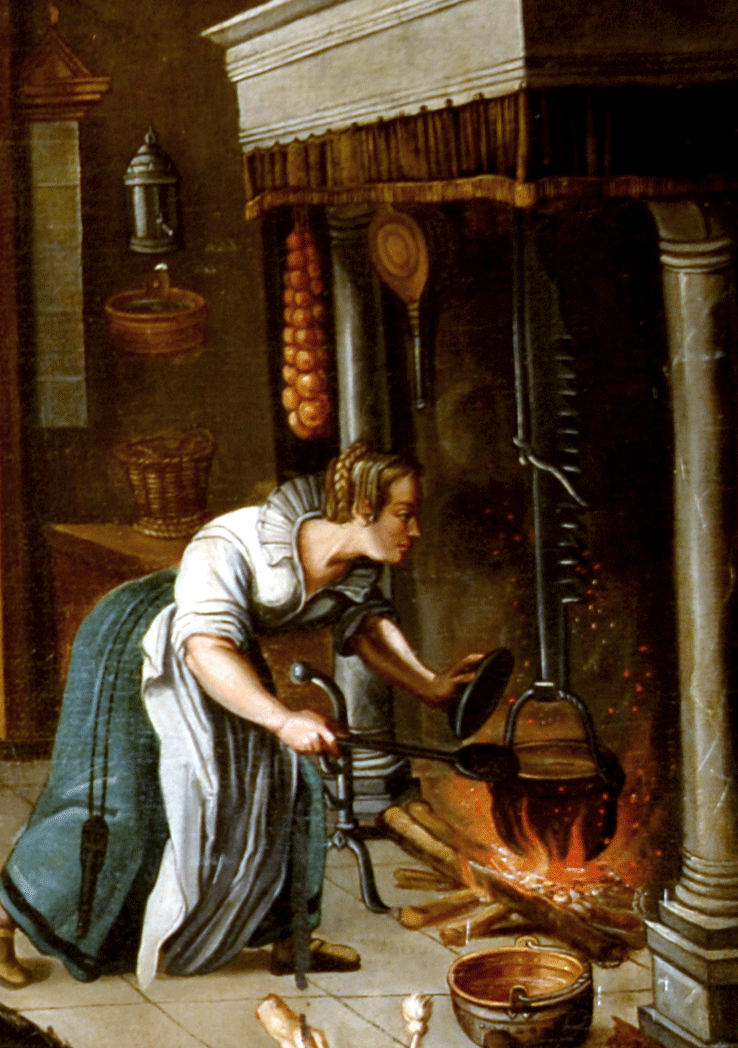
Joos Goemare detail of Le Christ chez Marthe et Marie, c. 1600—a chimney hook in use.

- In France, a housewarming party is called a pendaison de crémaillère, literally "hanging of the chimney hook". The expression comes from medieval times. When the construction of the house was finished, it was customary to invite all those who participated in its building to eat dinner as a vote of thanks. The food was prepared in a large pot, the temperature of which was controlled by a chimney hook, which could adjust the pot so it sat higher or lower over the fireplace. This hook was the last thing to be installed in the new house, marking the beginning of the thank-you meal.
- In India, this ceremony is known as grihapravesha, literally meaning "entering new house" (for the first time). In some places, they allow a cow (a sacred animal among the Hindus) to be the first to enter the house, as the first part of the ceremony. The ceremony usually involves the rite of vastu shanti, where a number of deities are propitiated to rid the house of evil spirits.
- The traditional Thai housewarming is a Buddhist ritual where monks, family, friends, and food play important roles.
- In the Southern United States, an old-fashioned type of party, known as a "Food Pounder", is popular. Traditionally, each guest would bring the new homeowners a pound of cheese, cornmeal, flour, sugar, or any other staple food needed to stock the new home's pantry. In modern times the tradition has been extended to canned goods and even fresh foods, but the hosts are still most likely to receive the basic foodstuffs needed to set up a kitchen.
- In Russia and other post-Soviet states, it is believed that a cat should be allowed to enter the new house first; this is said to bring home and family luck.
