= Tridip Suhrud =

Indian scholar and political scientist (born 1965)

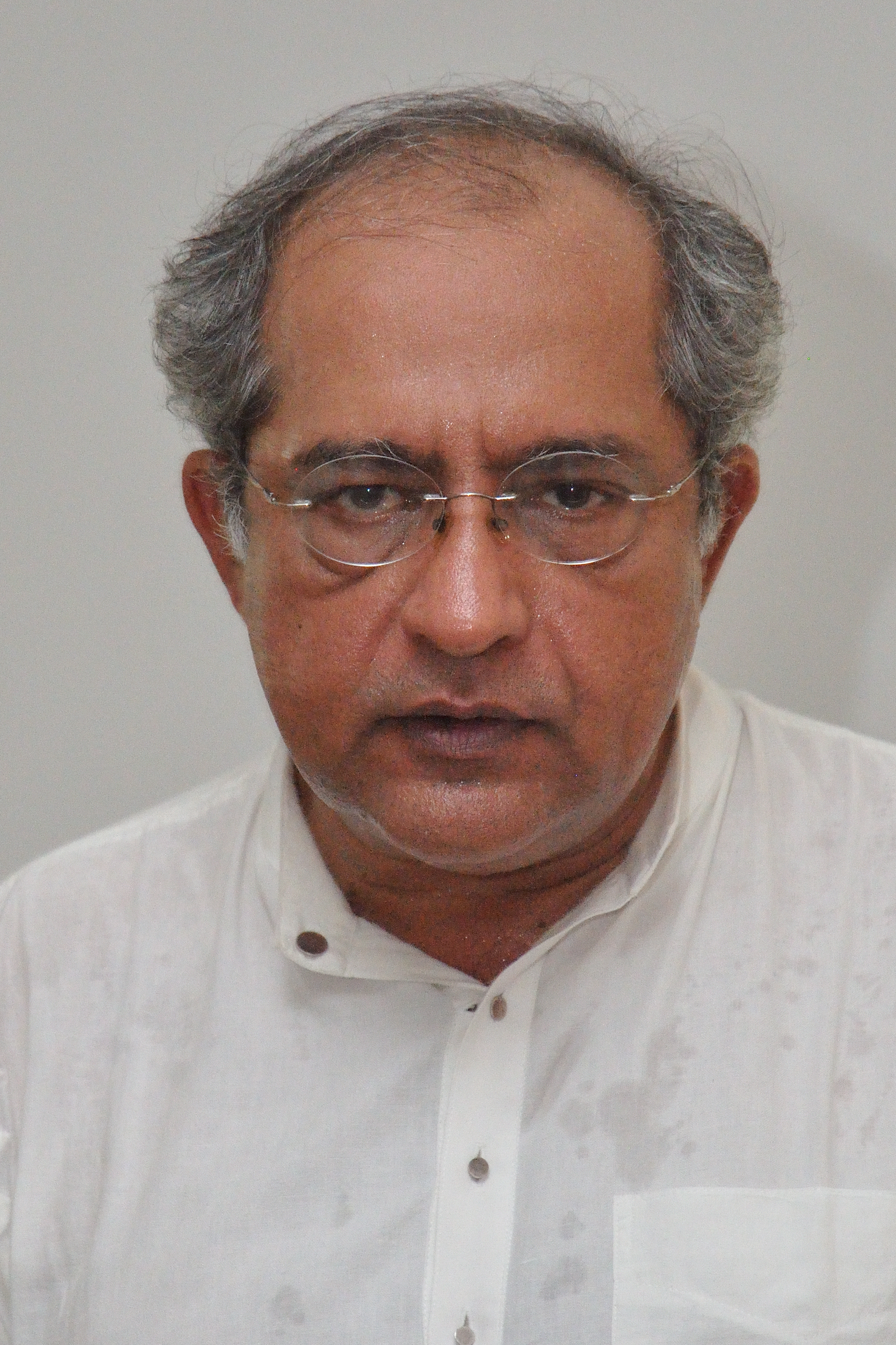
- Suhrud in 2016
- Born: 19 December 1965 (age 60); Anand, Gujarat
- Education: M.A, M.A., Ph.D
- Occupations: writer, political scientist, cultural historian and translator
- Writing career
- Language: Gujarati, English, Hindi
- Notable awards: Katha Award (1999), Sahitya Akademi Award (2010), Niranjan Bhagat Memorial Award (2019) Current Position: Professor and Provost, CEPT University, Director Lalbhai Dalpatbhai Institute of Indology and Chairman, Governing Council of MICA

Academic background
- Thesis: Narrations of a Nation: Explorations Through Intellectual Biographies (1999)
- Doctoral advisor: Ashis Nandy

Tridip Suhrud (born 19 December 1965) is an Indian scholar, political scientist, cultural historian and translator from Gujarat, India.

== Life ==
Suhrud was born on 19 December 1965 in Anand, Gujarat. He completed a Master of Arts in Economics and Political Science and earned a Ph.D. under Ashis Nandy for his thesis Narrations of a Nation: Explorations Through Intellectual Biographies, a socio-historical work on 19th century Gujarati literature in the context of autobiographies written by Narmad, Manilal Dwivedi and Govardhanram Tripathi.

He served as a coordinator at the Behavioural Science Centre, St. Xavier's College, Ahmedabad (1989–1992); as a visiting fellow at the Committee for Cultural Choices and Global Futures, CSDS, Delhi (1993–1994); as a faculty member at the National Institute of Design, Ahmedabad (1994–2001); and as a professor at DAIICT, Gandhinagar (2001–2012). After working for five years with Sabarmati Ashram as a director, he resigned in August 2017.

In 2017, he was appointed as professor and director of CEPT Archives. And in 2019 he was appointed as the provost for CEPT University. He is a member of the Gandhi Heritage Sites Mission of the Government of India. Currently he serves as Professor and Provost of CEPT University, Director of Lalbhai Dalpatbhai Institute of Indology and the Chairman of the Governing Council of MICA. He is also the Chairman of Darshak Itihas Nidhi.

== Works ==
He translated several works from English into Gujarati, including Ashis Nandy's The Intimate Enemy: Loss and Recovery of Self Under Colonialism as Antarang Ari, G. N. Devy's After Amnesia: Tradition and Change in Indian Literary Criticism as Smrutibhranshna Pagle Pagle and Chandulal Bhagubhai Dalal's biography of Harilal Gandhi as Harilal Gandhi: A Life (2007).

He translated two major works of Gujarati literature into English; Suresh Joshi's experimental novel Chhinnapatra (as Crumpled letter) and Govardhanram Tripathi's epic novel Saraswatichandra. He also translated the biography of Mahatma Gandhi in four volumes written by Narayan Desai into English from Gujarati.

He translated Mahatma Gandhi's Hind Swaraj into Hindi.

== Awards ==
He received the Katha Award in 1999. He received the Sahitya Akademi Translation Prize in 2009 for his translated work, Harilal Gandhi: A Life. He was given the inaugural Niranjan Bhagat Memorial Award (2019) for his contribution to Gujarati Literature.

== Bibliography ==
- Chandulal Bhagubhai Dalal; Tridip Suhrud (2007). Harilal Gandhi: a life. Orient Longman. ISBN 978-81-250-3049-2.
- Tridip Suhrud (2009). Writing Life: Three Gujarati Thinkers. Orient Blackswan. ISBN 978-81-250-3043-0.
- Tridip Suhrud (2010). An Autobiography, Or, The Story of My Experiments with Truth: A Table of Concordance. Routledge. ISBN 978-0-415-57142-5.
- Mahatma Gandhi (2014). Beloved Bapu: The Gandhi-Mirabehn Correspondence. Orient Blackswan Private Limited. ISBN 978-81-250-5615-7.
- Kinnari Bhatt; Tridip Suhrud; Malvika Singh (2016). Apostle of the Twentieth Century--M. K. Gandhi: Curated by Kinnari Bhatt and Tridip Suhrud. Academic Foundation. ISBN 978-93-327-0203-5.
- Suresh Hariprasad Joshi; Tridip Suhrud (1998). Crumpled letter. Macmillan India. ISBN 978-0-333-93188-2.

The complete bibliography of his published books is as under:

- Lilavati: A Life, Govardhanram Tripathi, translated with an Introduction by Tridip Suhrud (New Delhi: Penguin Random House, 2022)
- Scorching Love: Letters from Mohandas Karamchand Gandhi to his son Devadas, Gopalkrishna Gandhi and Tridip Suhrud (Oxford University Press, 2022)
- Thumb Printed: Champaran Indigo Peasants Speak to Gandhi, vol. 1, (editors), Shahid Amin, Tridip Suhrud, Megha Todi (Ahmedabad: Navajivan and National Archives of India, 2022)
- Ahimsak Pratikar, M K Gandhi, edited with an Introduction by Tridip Suhrud, (Ahmedabad: Navajivan, 2022)
- Letters to Gandhi, vol. 2, Tridip Suhrud, Megha Todi, Kinnari Bhatt (editors), Ahmedabad: Navajivan, 2020)
- The Gentle Revolutionary: The Collected Essays of L C Jain; edited with an Introduction by Tridip Suhrud, (Ahmedabad: Navajivan, 2020)
- Gandhi and Aesthetics; edited by Tridip Suhrud, (Mumbai: Marg, 2019)
- The Power of Non-violent Resistance, Selected Writings, M K Gandhi; Edited with an Introduction by Tridip Suhrud (New York: Penguin Classics, 2019)
- The Diary of Manu Gandhi: 1943-1944, (New Delhi: Oxford University Press and National Archives of India, 2019)
- M K Gandhi’s Hind Swaraj, Samikshit Avrutti, (Ahmedabad: Navajivan, 2019)
- M K Gandhi, Satya Na Prayogo athva Atma Katha. Samikshit Avrutti, (Ahmedabad: Navajivan, 2018)
- M K Gandhi, An Autobiography or The story of My Experiments with Truth, A Critical Edition, Introduced with Notes by Tridip Suhrud, (New Delhi: Penguin Random House, 2018 and Yale University Press, 2018, Hamish Hamilton, 2019 )
- Rashtravaad, Rabindranath Tagore, translated from the original English by Tridip Suhrud, Ahmedabad: Navajivan, 2017
- Letters to Gandhi, vol. 1, Tridip Suhrud, Megha Todi, Kinnari Bhatt (editors), Ahmedabad: Navajivan, 2017
- Sarasvatichandra Part 4, Sarasvatichandra’s Dream Land and Culmination, Govardhanram Madhavram Tripathi, Translated from the original Gujarati by Tridip Suhrud, Orient BlackSwan, 2017
- Sarasvatichandra Part 3, Ratna Nagari’s Statecraft, Govardhanram Madhavram Tripathi, Translated from the original Gujarati by Tridip Suhrud, Orient BlackSwan, 2016
- Sarasvatichandra Part 2, Gunasundari’s Household, Govardhanram Madhavram Tripathi, Translated from the original Gujarati by Tridip Suhrud, Orient BlackSwan, 2016
- Sarasvatichandra part 1, Buddhidhan’s Administration, Govardhanram Madhavram Tripathi, Translated from the original Gujarati by Tridip Suhrud, Orient BlackSwan, 2015
- Beloved Bapu: Letters of Mirabehn To Gandhiji; (with Thomas Weber), OrientBlackSwan, 2014
- Rojnishi, M K Gandhi, (edited with notes and introduction), Tridip Suhrud (Navajivan: 2014)
- Hind Swaraj: Ek Anushilan, (New Delhi: Rajkamal Prakashan & IIAS, Shimla), 2014
- Reading Gandhi In Two Tongues and Other Essays, (Shimla: Indian Institute of Advanced Study), 2012
- Kavi Ni Choki, Gujarat VisvaKosh Trust, 2012
- Speaking Of Gandhi’s Death (edited) with Peter Ronald deSouza, (New Delhi: Orient Blacswan, 2010)
- An Autobiography Or The Story of My Experiments with Truth: A Table of Concordance, (New Delhi and London: Routledge, 2009)
- M K Gandhi’s Hind Swaraj, Suresh Sharma and Tridip Suhrud (New Delhi: Orient BlackSwan, 2009, Reprinted, 2019) Translated in French as Gandhi: Hind Swaraj, L’e´mancipation a` L’ Indienne, traduction par Annie Montaut (Fayard: 2014)
- My Life Is My Message (Vols. 1-4), Narayan Desai, Translated from the original Gujarati, Tridip Suhrud (New Delhi: Orient BlackSwan, 2009)
- Hind Swaraj Vishe, PurvaPrakash, Baroda, 2008
- Writing Life: Three Gujarati Thinkers, Orient Blackswan, New Delhi, 2008
- Harilal Gandhi: A Life, C B Dalal, Edited and Translated by Tridip Suhrud, Orient Longman, New Delhi, 2007 (Translated in Telugu, 2015)
- SmritiBrhansh Ne PaglePagle, Translation of After Amnesia: tradition and change in Indian Literacy Criticism, Sahitya Academy, New Delhi, 2005
- Crumpled Letter, Suresh Joshi, Translated by Tridip Suhrud, MacMillan India Ltd, 1998
- Pratishabda, Ashis Nandy, edited and translated by Tridip Suhrud, Ahmedabad; 1994
- Bandharan Na Lakshano, Gurjar, Ahmedabad; 1993,
- Antarang Ari, AshisNandy, Translated by Tridip Suhrud, Ahmedabad; 1993
