= Suresh Joshi =

Indian Gujarati-language writer and poet (1921-1986)

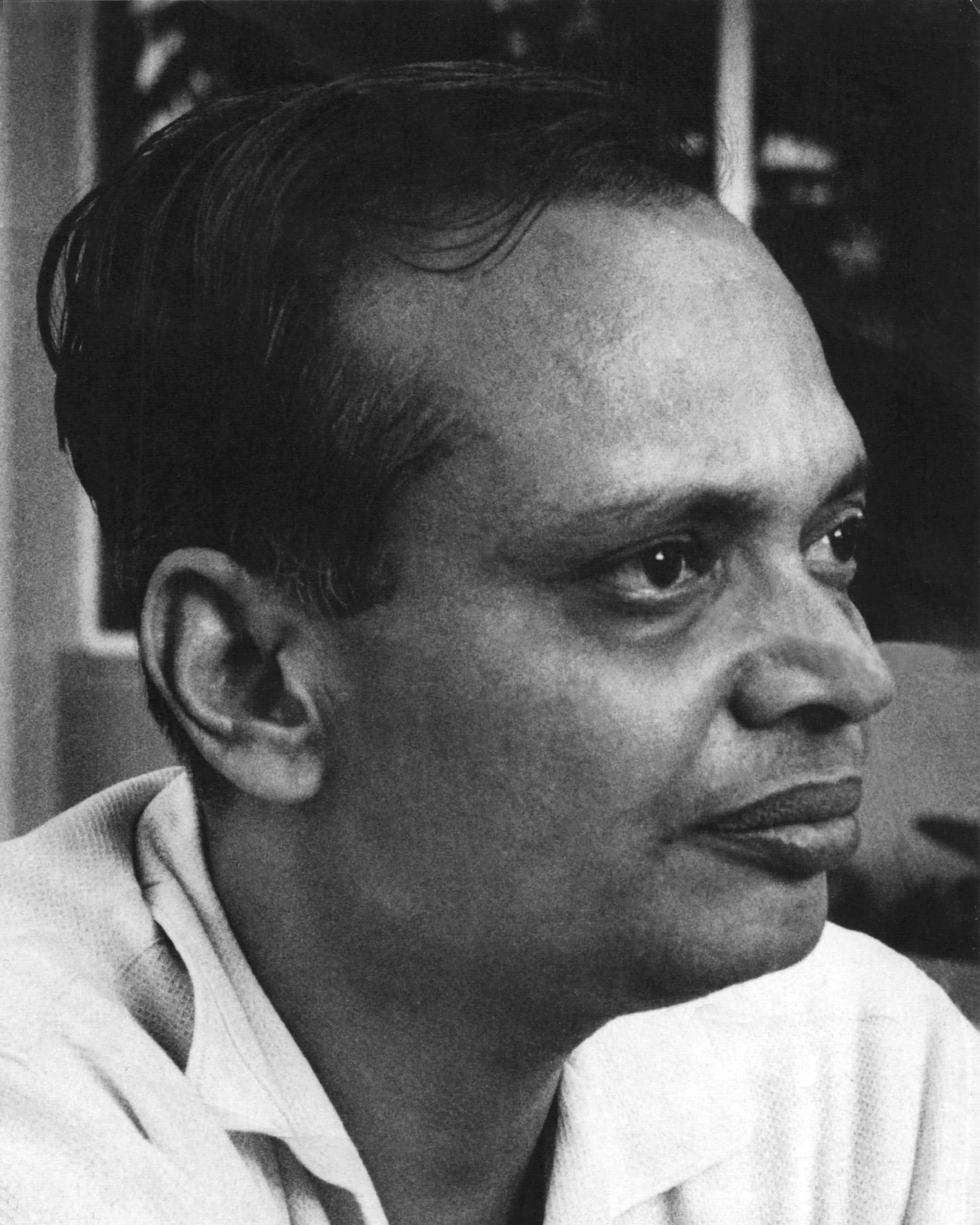
- Joshi in 1955, Mumbai
- Born: Suresh Hariprasad Joshi; 30 May 1921; Valod, Bardoli, Bombay presidency, British India
- Died: 6 September 1986 (aged 65); Nadiad, Gujarat, India
- Education: Elphinstone College
- Occupations: Novelist; short-story writer; critic; poet; translator; essayist
- Writing career
- Language: Gujarati
- Notable works: Grihapravesh (1957); Janantike (1965); Chhinnapatra (1965); Maranottar (1973); Chintayami Manasa (1983)
- Notable awards: Ranjitram Suvarna Chandrak (1971); Sahitya Akademi Award (1983; declined)

Academic background
- Thesis: A Critical Edition of Jnanagita (1616 A. D.) of Narahari
- Doctoral advisor: Bhogilal Sandesara

Academic work
- Doctoral students: Shirish Panchal
- Website: sureshjoshi.org

Suresh Hariprasad Joshi (30 May 1921 – 6 September 1986) was an Indian novelist, short-story writer, literary critic, poet, translator, editor and academic in the Gujarati language. Along with his teaching career, he led the modernist movement in Gujarati literature. He was prolific writer and he transformed the field of literary criticism.

== Life ==
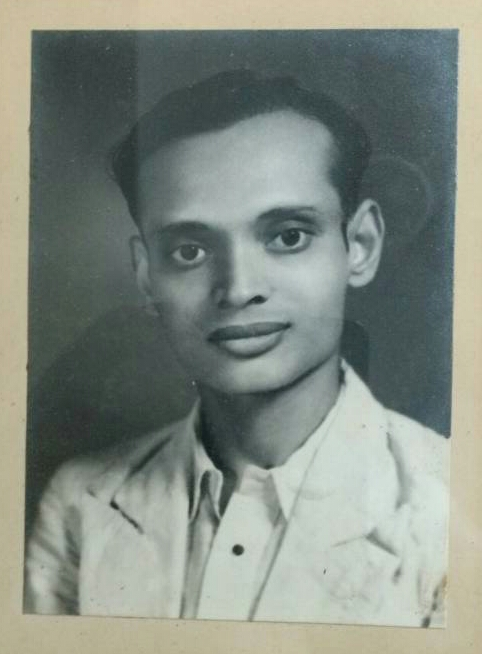
Joshi at the age of 29

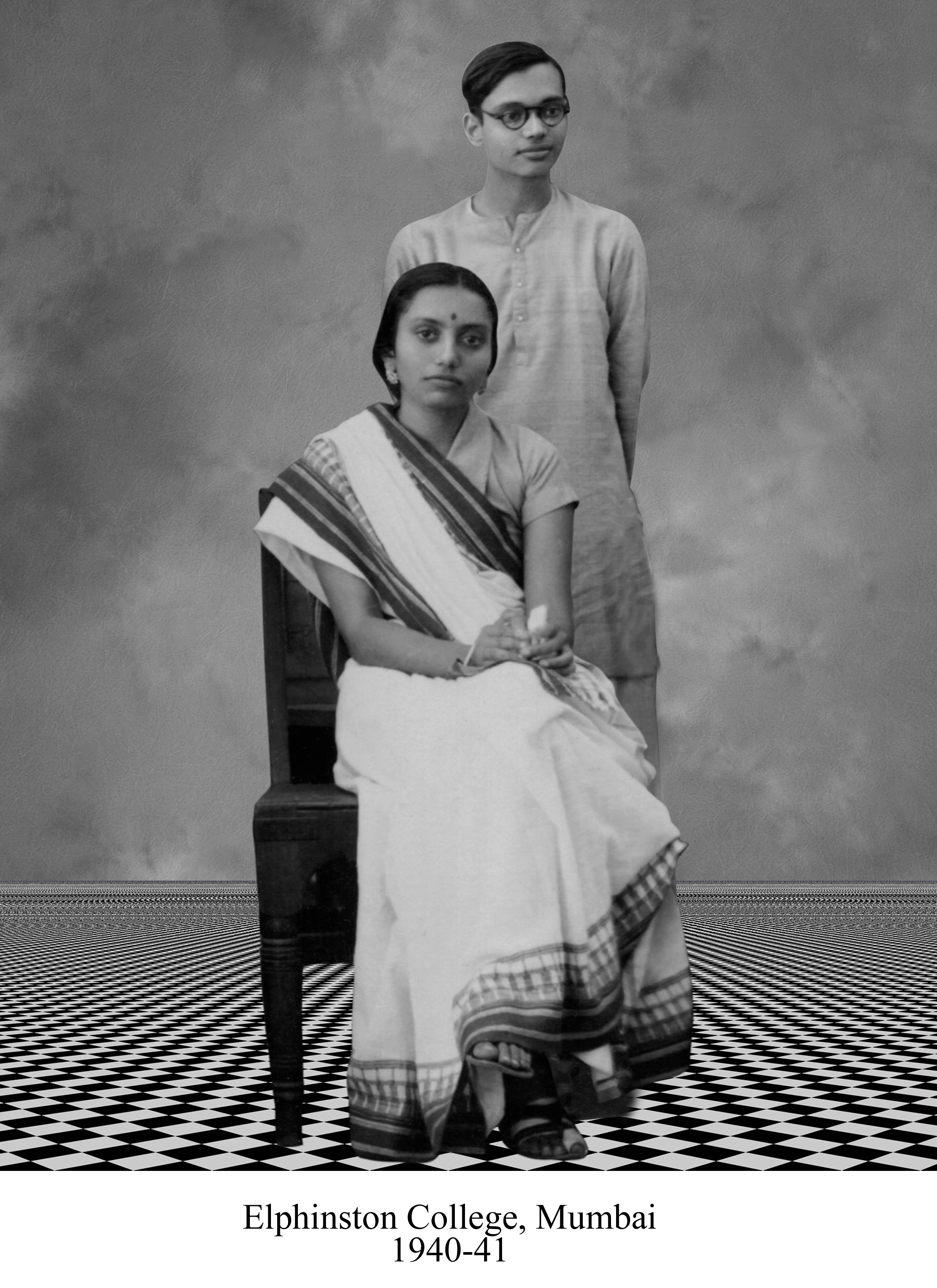
Joshi with his wife Usha Joshi

Young Suresh Joshi

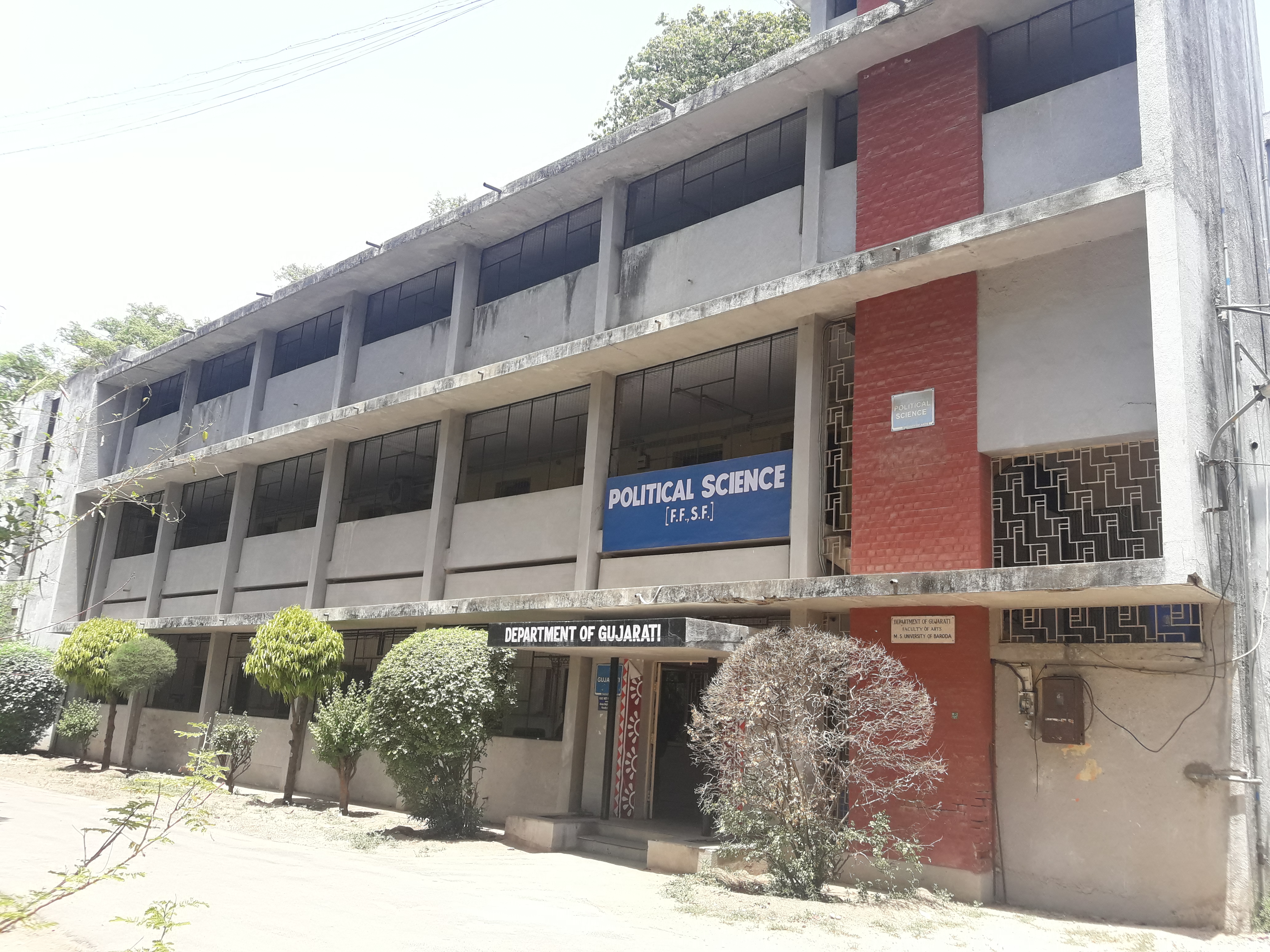
Building of Department of Gujarati, M. S. University

He was born in Valod, a small town near Bardoli in South Gujarat on 30 May 1921. He did his schooling from Songadh and Gangadhara. He matriculated from Navsari in 1938. He completed his BA in 1943 and MA from Elphinstone College in 1945. In the same year, he started teaching at D. J. Singh College in Karachi and later joined Sardar Patel University, Vallabh Vidyanagar in 1947. From 1951, he served as a lecturer, professor and later as Head of the Gujarati Department at the Maharaja Sayajirao University of Baroda, Vadodara till his retirement in 1981.

His early life was spent at Songadh which influenced his life. At the age of eight, he secretly published his poem in Baljeevan magazine. He edited Falguni magazine in his college life. Upjati (1956) was his first published work. He had also edited Manisha, Kshitij, Etad and Uhapoh magazines.

He died on 6 September 1986 due to kidney failure at Nadiad.

== Style ==
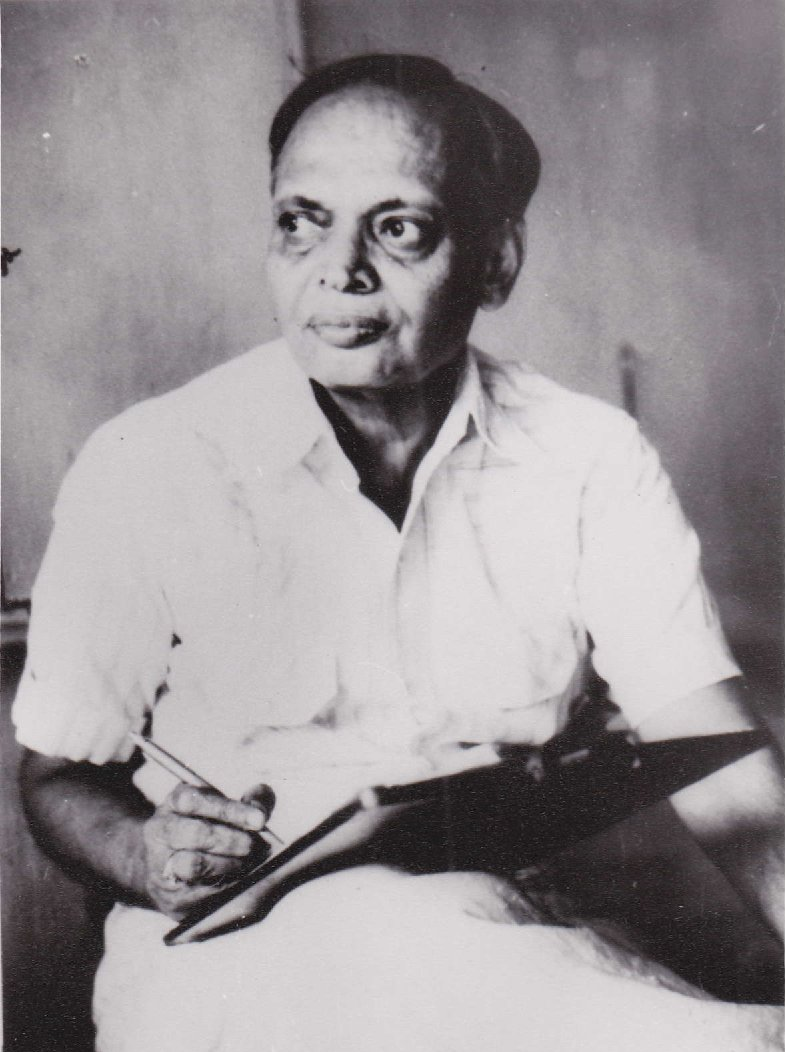
Joshi at the age of 45, Vadodara

Joshi influenced many up-and-coming writers in the 1960s and 1970s. His personal essays "are said to have introduced a new prose style in Gujarati literature," according to Gujarati scholar Sarala Jag Mohan. He was influenced by efforts of experimentation in western literature.

He was one of the chief exponents of experimentalist poetry in Gujarati, primarily through his literary criticism, rather than his poems. Under his influence, form, technique and structure became far more important considerations within Gujarati poetry. The torments of the individual and literary craftsmanship became more highly esteemed, but intelligibility, lyricism and musicality were valued less, as were social concerns of the writer and even the contents of the work, according to Deepak B. Mehta.

Existentialism and phenomenology were prime interests of his.

== Works ==
Suresh Joshi was a modernist author who led the modernist movement in Gujarati literature which emerged after 1955, the post-Gandhian era. He is recognized as the father of modern Gujarati literature and as the leader of avant-garde writers in Gujarati. According to Gujarati critic Bharat Mehta, the period of Gujarati literature from 1975 to 2000 was highly influenced by Suresh Joshi.

Upjati (1956), Pratyancha (1961), Itara (1973) and Tathapi (1980) are his poetry collections. He withdrew his first publication Upjati on his second publication. Through his poems, he introduced obscurity and ambiguity to Gujarati literature.

His four novels are collectively published as Kathachatushtay. Two of them, Chhinnapatra (1965) and Maranottar (1973) were already published before. Vidula and Kathachakra were published before with other short stories but Joshi considered them as novels and published again with other two. Chhinnapatra was translated into English by Tridip Suhrud as Crumpled letters (1998).

He was very experimental in novellas. He transformed the genre in Gujarati literature by his continued experimentation and esthetics. Grihapravesh (1957), Biji Thodik Vartao (1958), Apich (1965), Na Tatra Suryo Bhati (1967), Ekda Naimisharanye (1980) are his collections of stories which include 62 novellas. His 21 stories were collected in Maniti Anmaniti (1982), edited by Shirish Panchal. He promoted a theory of fiction known as Ghatanavilop which focuses on suggestive potential of language instead of plot element in fiction.

Janantike (1965) is his first collection of essays. His other essay collections are Idam Sarvam (1971), Ahobat Kim Ashcharyam (1975), Iti Me Iti (1987). Bhavyami (1984) includes selected essays edited by Shirish Panchal from his more than thousand essays. Janantike was translated into English by V. Y. Kantak as Intimated Asides (1995).

He was a reformer in field of literary criticism. His first work of criticism Kinchit (1960) rebelled against established norms. Gujarati Kavitano Aswad (1962), Kavyacharcha (1971), Kathopkathan, Shrunavantu (1972), Arunyarudan (1976), Chintayami Manasa (1983), Ashtamoahyay (1984) are his other collections of criticism.

Madhyakalin Gyanmargi Kavyadharani Bhumika (1978) is his research work. Jananti Ye Kimapi (1984) is collection of six essays edited by him which focuses on new movement in literary criticism. He edited some anthologies; Navonmesh (1971), Narharini Gyangeeta (1978), Gujarati Sarjanatmak Gadya: Ek Sankalan (1981), Vastana Pado (1983). Parakiya (1975) is his collection of translation of fine world poetry. Dhire Vahe Chhe Don Volume I (1960) and Bhonytaliyano Adami (1967) are translations of Russian novels. Shikari Bandook ane Hajar Saraso (1975) is translation of Japanese stories. Ameriki Tunki Varta (1967) is translation of The Short Story in America by Raymond B. West. Amerikana Sahityano Itihas (1965) is translation of book by Marcus Cunliffe. He translated essays of Rabindranath Tagore in Panchamrut (1949) and Sanchay (1963).

== Awards ==
He was awarded Ranjitram Suvarna Chandrak in 1971. He refused to accept Sahitya Akademi Award in 1983 which was awarded to him for Chintayami Manasa. He said that,"The book contains nothing more than some stray essay. It is only critical articles based on European and American criticism, and not reflects his original critical thinking". He was awarded the Narmad Suvarna Chandrak for Janantike in 1965.

== See also ==
- List of Gujarati-language writers
