= Maranottar =

1973 Gujarati novel by Suresh Joshi

- First edition cover, 1973
- Author: Suresh Joshi
- Original title: મરણોત્તર
- Language: Gujarati
- Genre: Lyrical novel
- Publication date: 1973
- Publication place: India
- Media type: Print
- Pages: 71 pages
- Dewey Decimal: 891.473
- LC Class: PK1859.J593 M3
- Preceded by: Chhinnapatra (1965)
- Text: Maranottar online

Maranottar (Gujarati: મરણોત્તર; English: Posthumous) is a Gujarati novel by Suresh Joshi. It is written almost in the form of lyrical prose letter style.

== Content ==
The novel is prefaced with five different quotations, one each from György Lukács, Antonín Bartušek, Malcolm Lowry, W. H. Auden and Paul Valéry. The theme of death is presented in Lowry's quotation and the technique is suggested by Valery.

It has 45 short chapters in 71 printed pages. The chapters are built around the theme of approaching death, written with poetic imagery and ending with the poetic refrain of the name, 'Mrinal'. The novel is addressed to Mrinal, the lead female character, and some other characters like Sudhir, Gopi, Namita and Megha.

Joshi has used the techniques of an extraterrestrial narrator. The novel is narrated in first person.

== Criticism ==
It is considered as Joshi's prominent experimental novel. However Ila Pathak wrote that, in Maranottar as well as in his another novel Chhinnapatra, the women characters appear only as the targets of men's lustful desires. K. M. George considers it as an intended anti-novel which ended up only as an experiment difficult to read or comprehend.

== Translation ==
Maranottar has been translated into French as Temoignage Posthume by Sheela Karki and published in 2017.
