= Parvesh =

Parvesh is a masculine given name. Notable people with the name include:

- Parvesh Bhainswal (born 1997), Indian kabaddi player
- Parvesh Cheena, American actor
- Parvesh Shaheen, Pakistani historian and author
- Parvesh Chander Sharma (born 1956), Indian weightlifter
- Parvesh Verma, Indian politician

== See also ==
- Pravesh, masculine given name
- Pravessh Rana, Indian actor, television host, and model
