= Chintayami Manasa =

1983 collection of essays by Suresh Joshi

- cover page
- Author: Suresh Joshi
- Original title: ચિન્તયામિ મનસા
- Language: Gujarati
- Subject: Literary criticism
- Set in: Ahmedabad
- Publisher: Sadbhav Prakashan, Sahitya Akademi
- Publication date: 1983
- Publication place: India
- Pages: 156
- Awards: Sahitya Akademi Award (1983)
- OCLC: 10208370
- LC Class: PK1850.5 .J5777 1982
- Text: Chintayami Manasa online

Chintayami Manasa (Gujarati: ચિન્તયામિ મનસા; English: Thinking Deeply), published in 1983, is a critical work of essays in the Gujarati language by Indian writer Suresh Joshi. Joshi evaluated ideas based on European and American criticism, like new criticism, semiotics linguistics-oriented criticism, modernism, and postmodernism in the book. In 1983, he received the Sahitya Akademi Award for his book, which he refused to accept.

== Contents ==
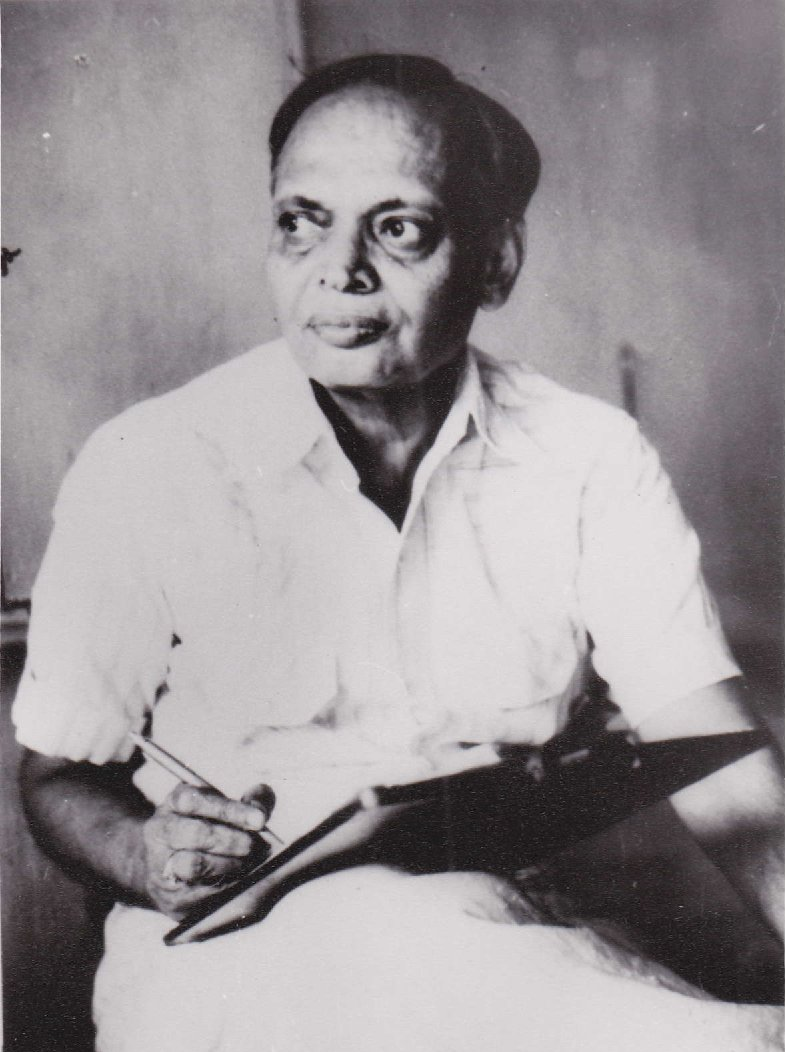
Suresh Joshi, the writer of Chintayami Manasa

Chintayami Manasa contains thirteen chapters, written during 1977 to 1980.

=== Chapters 1-5 ===
The first chapter of the book, "Arthaghatan?" ("Interpretation?"), begins by questioning whether 'interpretation' is the appropriate term for the kind of literary analysis commonly conducted by scholars and their students. It is an analysis of the concept of interpretation, with an inquiry into symbols and metaphors. In the second chapter, "Sahitya ane Philsufi" ("Literature and Philosophy"), Joshi explains the relationship between these two concepts. It gives perspective on how literature should be read, with or without philosophy. The next chapter, "Kasmai Devay Havisha Vidhema?" ("To Which Deity Shall We Make the Offering?"), is a study of the role of literature and creative writers in the society.

The fourth chapter contains a discussion on Sartre entitled "Sartre: Aaj Na Sandarbhma" ("Sartre: In Today’s Context"), in which Joshi discusses Sartre in the context of the decay of values and ideas that society once held high and the emergence of a new reality of human lives and of science. It also focuses on Sartre's existentialism. Chapter 5, "Sarjak, Sarjan ane Vivechan" ("Writer, Writing and Criticism"), is a detailed analysis of the nature and functions of all three: writer, literature, and criticism.

=== Chapters 6-13 ===
The sixth chapter, "Vivechan no Chaitanyavadi Abhigam" ("The Critical Approach of the Critics of Consciousness"), is a descriptive account of the school of Critics of Consciousness. It examines the fruitful application of this school of thought in literary criticism, in the context of Joshi's time. Joshi explains the position of the critics of consciousness and states that a critic or reader must understand the consciousness of the artist who has created the work. He also places all the major critics of consciousness, namely Marcel Remo, Albert Bengui, and Georges Poulet, in terms of their contributions to the theory.

In the next chapter, "Kavya Vivechan no Ek Navo Abhigam?" ("A New Approach to Criticism of Poetry?"), Joshi critiques the influence of criticism on writers and readers. He adds that criticism is useful and appropriate as long as it helps readers with interpretation, but if it takes away the joy of reading it should be abandoned. In the eighth chapter, "Octavio Paz ni Kavyavibhavana" ("Octavio Paz'’s Concept of Poetry"), Joshi reviewed the ideas of poetry given by Octavio Paz. The ninth chapter, "Sanketvigyan ni Saiddhantik Bhumika" ("The Theoretical Position of Semiology"), describes the basic theoretical position of Sanket Vigyan (Semiology). He discusses the areas semiology should focus on and the way a number of topics can be studied with a semiological approach.

Chapter 10, "Navya Vivechan Vishe Thodu" ("A Bit about New Criticism"), is an essay on how New Criticism emerged and developed as a school of literary criticism. The essay explains the origins of its development by the leading exponents of New Criticism like John Crowe Ransom, Allen Tate, Kenneth Burke, and Robert Penn Warren. The eleventh chapter, "Sahitya Vivechan ane Bhasha Vigyan" ("Literary Criticism and Linguistics"), shows the function of linguistics in literary criticism. In the last chapter, "Arvachinata ane Anuarvachinata" ("Modernity and Postmodernity"), Joshi explores the Modern and Post-Modern schools of literary theory.

== Awards ==
Sahitya Akademi selected this book for the Sahitya Akademi Award in 1983, but Joshi refused to accept the award, saying: "The book contains nothing more than some stray essay [sic]." He further added that it only contains critical articles based on European and American criticism and does not reflect his own original critical thinking.
