= Grihapravesh (book) =

Short story collection by Suresh Joshi

- Cover page
- Author: Suresh Joshi
- Original title: ગૃહપ્રવેશ
- Language: Gujarati
- Publisher: Chetan Prakashan, Vadodara (1st ed.); Butala Prakashan, Vadodara (2nd ed.)
- Publication date: 1957
- Publication place: India
- OCLC: 20924298
- LC Class: PK1859.J593
- Text: Grihapravesh online

Grihapravesh (Note: The title Grihapravesh (Stepping In or Entering the House) indicates a formal, ritualistic entrance into a newly acquired house.) (pronounced [gruhprəveʃ]; transl. Entering the House) is a 1957 collection of short stories by Indian writer Suresh Joshi, written in Gujarati. The collection gave rise to a new form of short story writing in Gujarati literature, favouring language over plot.

== Publication ==
The first edition of Grihapravesh was published by Chetan Prakashan in Vadodara in 1957. The second edition of the book was published in 1973 by Butala Prakashan, also in Vadodara.

== Background ==
Joshi expresses his formalist approach in the preface, discussing his style of short stories and creative art in general. In the preface, Joshi explains his form of short stories which, according to him, should not have the element of bare incident. He places emphasis on the form of short story, rather than the content. As a result, in the stories of Grihapravesh, the words chosen carry deeper meaning.

In the preface of the book, Joshi details his view of short story writing:

While writing these stories something striked me. Suppose the things, which we want to say, are being told from the opposite angle. I thought that this would be very interesting. In games also we prefer very strong opponents, otherwise the game would be very dull. Franz Kafka said somewhere: 'Our strength flows from our adversaries'. Thomas Mann said the same thing using different words in his famous story — Tonio Kröger — 'The real artist never talks about the main thing.' Psychologists say that it is human beings' primitive instincts, they have named it as enantiodromia — the tendency to reach out for the ossosite. Kalidas also used this method. In Meghadūta, on one hand there is Yaksha sitting at Ramgiri and on the other hand there is Yakshakanta at Alkanagari which is full of luxurious life — between these two the poet had placed restlessness of the first day of Ashadha month. Suppose a beloved bursts out that she is very sad because her lover is far away we do not feel any charm in her saying but suppressing her agony if she says that Krishnachuda (one kind of flowery creeper) has not blossomed, we get convinced about her sadness. (Note: English translation. Original statement in Gujarati: પણ મને આ વાર્તા લખતાં એક બીજી વાત સૂઝી: આપણે જે કહેવા ઇચ્છીએ છીએ તેને એનાથી જેટલે દૂર જઈને કહીએ તેમ વધારે મજા પડે. રમતમાં પ્રતિપક્ષી જેમ વધારે હંફાવે એવો હોય તેમ વધારે મજા. કાફકા એક સ્થળે કહે છે: Our strength flows from our adversaries. ટોમસ માન ‘ટોનિયો ક્રોગર’ની વાર્તામાં આ જ વસ્તુને બીજી રીતે કહે છે: The real artist never talks about the main thing. માનસશાસ્ત્રીઓએ કહ્યું છે કે આ મનુષ્યની એક આદિમ વૃત્તિ છે. એને એ લોકો કહે છે: Enantiodromia ડ્ઢ the tendency to reach out for the opposite. કાલિદાસે પણ રામગિરિ પરનો પંગુ બનેલો યક્ષ અને અલકાનગરીના વિલાસવૈભવ વચ્ચે પંગુ બનીને બેઠેલી યક્ષકાન્તા – આ બે નિશ્ચલતાની વચ્ચે જ અષાઢના પ્રથમ દિવસની ચંચલતાને મૂકીને આલેખી છે ને? કોઈ વિરહિણી સીધેસીધું એમ કહે કે આજે મારું મન પ્રિયવિરહથી ખિન્ન છે તો એની અસર પડતી નથી; પણ પોતાના દુ:ખની વાતને સાવ ટાળીને એ કહે કે આજે આંગણામાંની કૃષ્ણચૂડાની કળીઓ ખીલી નથી તો એના મનની વિષણ્ણ સ્થિતિની આપણને અસરકારક રીતે પ્રતીતિ થઈ જાય છે.)

== Contents ==
The collection has 21 short stories. These stories represent various situations that come into existence as a result of male–female attraction:

"Grihapravesh": This is the title story in the book, in which the author uses imagistic language to emphasise the tormented self of the protagonist, Suhas.

"Dviagaman": (Note: The word dviagaman has Sanskrit roots. It refers to the coming back of the wife to her husband's home after living with her parents' place for some time immediately after marriage. In Joshi's story, it is about Harshadrai's homecoming and not his wife's.) This story gives a metaphoric account of the separation between Harshadrai, the protagonist, and his family members.

"Rakshshas" ("The Demon"): While the protagonist is on the way to his bed-ridden ex-lover, who is suffering from tuberculosis, the narrative of their past love affair comes into the picture with vivid imagery of the horrors they experienced as children.

"Nal Damayanti": This short story depicts the life of a wife of an unemployed and poor man.

== Reception ==
Grihapravesh set a new trend in modern Gujarati short stories, and gave rise to a new form of short story in Gujarati literature. The book, as well as Joshi's reimagining of the form of short stories, has been called 'revolutionary' in Gujarati literature. In a review of the book, Dileep Jhaveri wrote that the book was "the first to change the craft of telling a story and its definition in Gujarati in the middle of the last century".
