= Mukund Parikh =

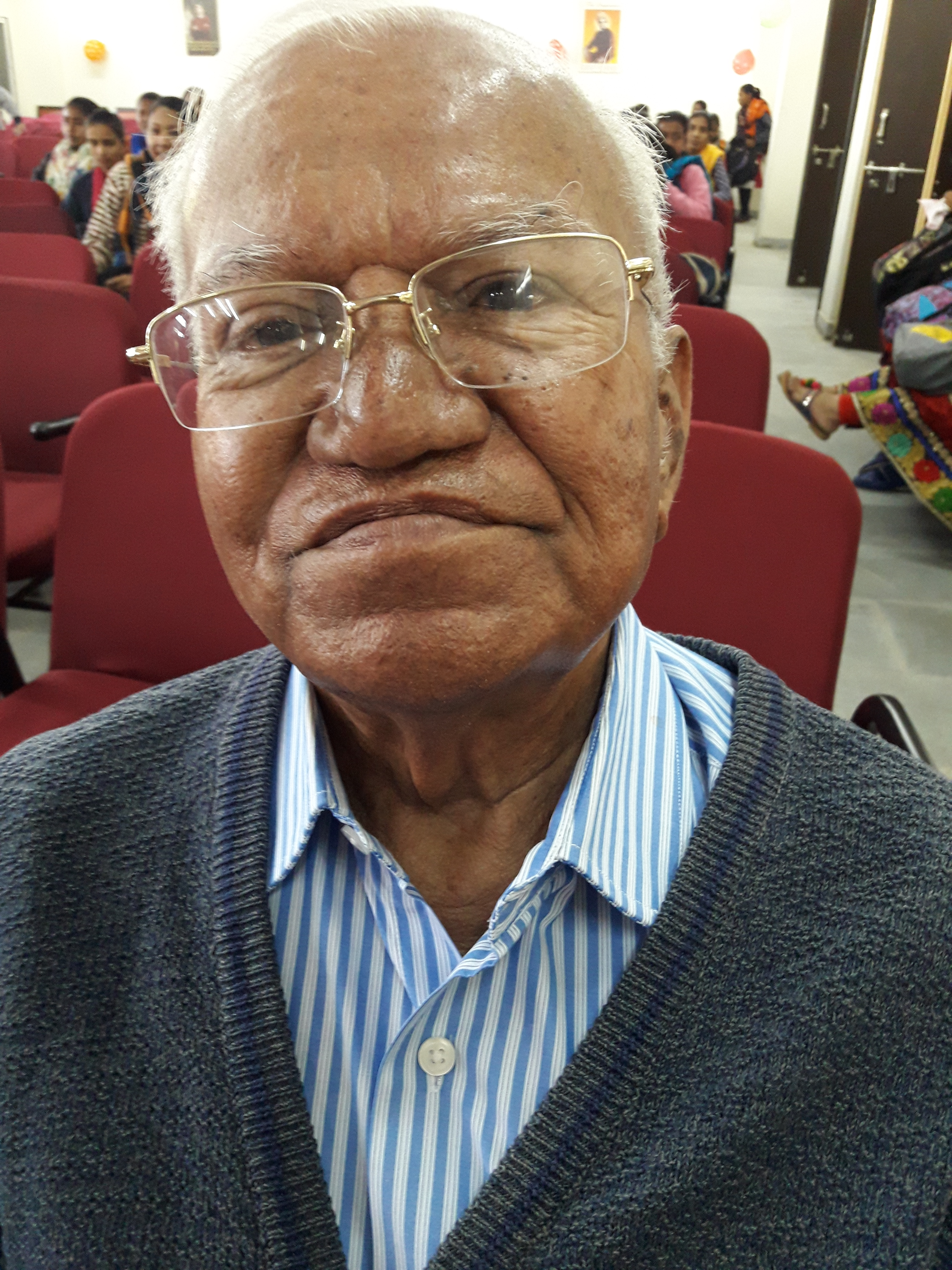
- At government college, Kathlal, January 2018
- Born: Mukund Bhailal Parikh; 26 January 1934 (age 92); Nadisar, Panchmahal district, Gujarat, India
- Education: B.A, LL.B
- Alma mater: Gujarat University
- Occupations: Poet, novelist, playwright
- Writing career
- Language: Gujarati
- Period: modern Gujarati literature
- Notable work: Mahabhinishkraman (1968)
- Literary movement: Re Math, Akanth Sabarmati

Mukund Parikh (born 26 January 1934) is a Gujarati novelist, poet and playwright from Gujarat, India.

== Life ==
Mukund Parikh was born on 26 January 1934 in Nadisar village (now in Panchmahal district, Gujarat) to Bhailal Parikh. He completed his primary and secondary education from his native town Balasinor. He completed his B.A. in economics from Dharmendrasinhji College, Rajkot in 1957. He worked in a Provident Fund Commissioner Office from 1954 to 1980. He studied LL.B. from Ahmedabad in 1980 from Gujarat University. Since 1981, he is working as a lawyer.

== Works ==
His Mahabhinishkraman (1968) was an experimental novel. The story follows a love triangle of a character named Amit Dalal and it explores his relationship with three ladies: Chandan, his mother; Rama, his wife and Saroj, his lover. Parikh employs the stream of consciousness in his narration. He has used motifs such as pipal tree and darkness. He has explored Oedipus complex in his character's relationships. The novel was particularly praised for its language.

He was associated with the experimental literary circles such as Re Math and Akanth Sabarmati. His one-act play Choras Inda Ane Gol Kabaro was included in a collection of five one-act plays Make Believe (1968) published by Re Math. This play is considered as an example of an absurd play from the early period of modern Gujarati literature. It is a psychological play flipping the places of an actor and the viewers in the theatre. Moksh (1975) is his one-act plays collection.

Man Chitarie (2004) is his poetry collection awarded by Gujarat Sahitya Akademi.

He co-edited poetry journal Shabda with Ravji Patel.

== See also ==
- List of Gujarati-language writers
