= Shirish Panchal =

Indian Gujarati-language critic and writer (Born: 1943)

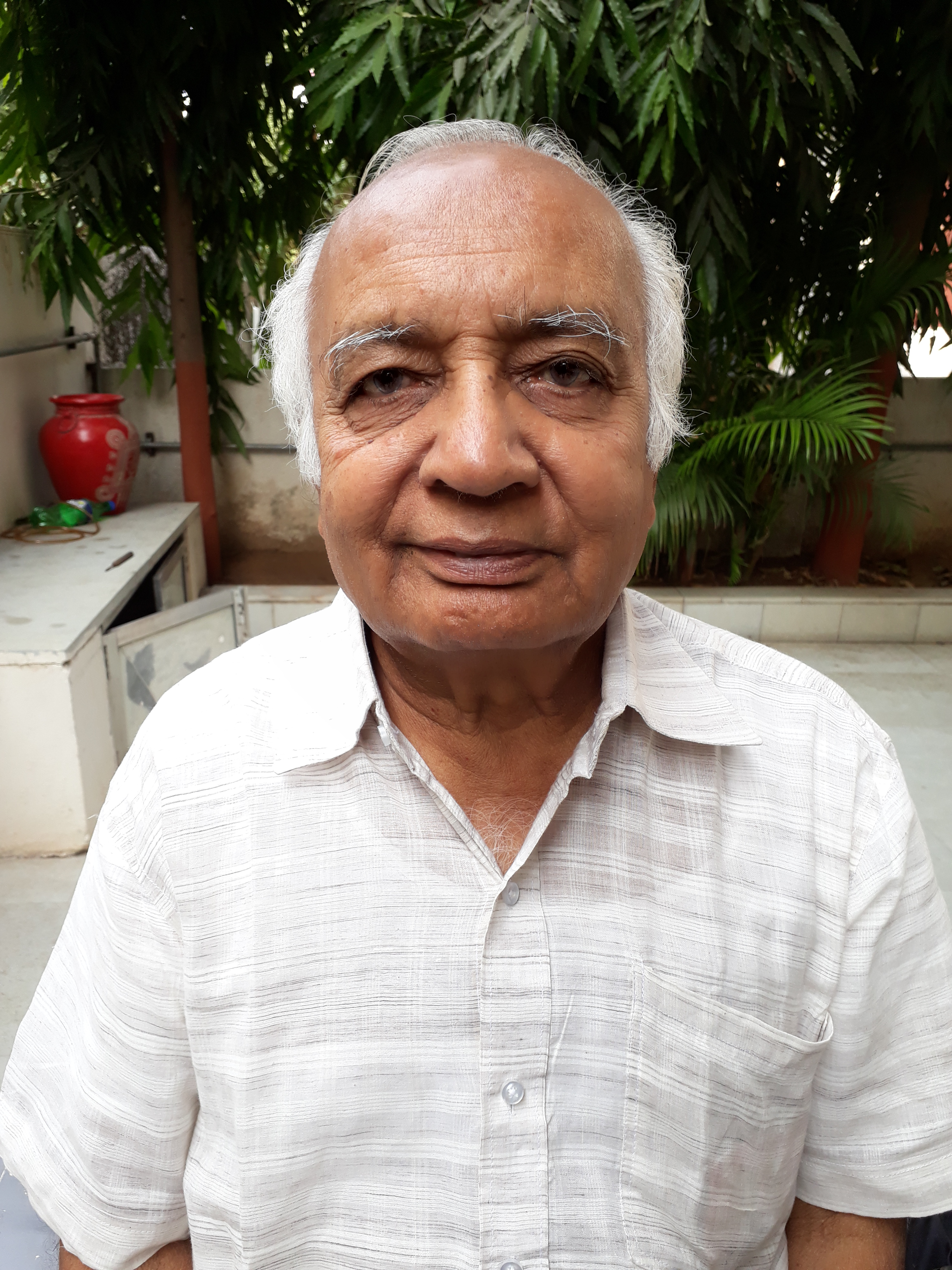
- Panchal at his home in Vadodara, December 2017
- Born: Shirish Jagjivandas Panchal; 7 March 1943 (age 83); Vadodara, Baroda State, British Raj
- Occupations: Critic, Editor
- Writing career
- Language: Gujarati
- Notable work: Vaat Aapanaa Vivechanni
- Notable awards: Sahitya Academy Award

Academic background
- Thesis: Kavyavivechan Ni Samasyao (1979)
- Doctoral advisor: Suresh Joshi

Academic work
- Doctoral students: Sharifa Vijaliwala

Shirish Panchal's voice
recitation of "Chakravaka Mithun" written by Kant

Shirish Jagjivandas Panchal (born 7 March 1943) is an Indian Gujarati-language literary critic, fiction writer, translator and editor from Gujarat, India. He was awarded the 2009 Sahitya Akademi Award for his critical work Vaat Aapanaa Vivechan-ni. He refused the award.

== Biography ==
Panchal was born on 7 March 1943 in Vadodara. He passed his secondary and higher secondary board exams in 1978 and 1981 respectively. He completed his B.A. with Gujarati from Maharaja Sayajirao University of Baroda. After completing his M.A. in the same subject from the same university in 1966, he researched Poetic Criticism under the guidance of Suresh Joshi in 1980. Panchal received a PhD for his dissertation Kavyavivechan Ni Samasyao (lit. 'Problems of poetic criticism'). He was a professor at Bilimora's College from 1965 to 1967 and at Padra's College from 1967 to 1980. Since 1980 he has been a lecturer in the Gujarati Department of M.S. University, Vadodara. He taught Gujarati language and literature at M. S. University, Baroda.

== Works ==
His first One-act play was published in Vishvmangal magazine. His short stories Varsha, Vallari and Aaram was published in Navbharat in 1962.

He wrote a short essay on the novel (1984) under the Sahityaswarup Parichay series edited by Suman Shah. His Vaidehee Etle Ja Vaidehee is an experimental novel, which tell a love-story of Kirat and Vaidehee. He edited and published Maniti Anamaniti (1982), 21 selected short stories by Suresh Joshi, with discourse. Problems of Poetic Criticism (1985) is his dissertation. Jara Motethi (1988) is his collection of essays. Ruprachanthi Vighatan (lit. 'The Dissolution of Form') (1986) is a critical treatise re-examining the concept of modernity.

He edited Etad, a Gujarati quarterly.

== Awards ==
In 2009, He won the Sahitya Akademi Award for Gujarati language for his criticism Vaat Aapanaa Vivechan-ni but he refused the award.

== See also ==
- List of Gujarati-language writers
