= Amargadh =

Village in Gujarat, India

Amargadh (also known as Jithari) is a village in Sihor, Bhavnagar district, Gujarat, India.

It has a famous tuberculosis hospital, the K. J. Mehta T.B. Hospital, built on land donated by Maharaja Krishnakumar Sihji.

There is also the College of Dental Science, with a research center on the campus.
