= Shrikant Shah =

Indian Gujarati-language poet, novelist, short story writer and playwright (1936-2020)

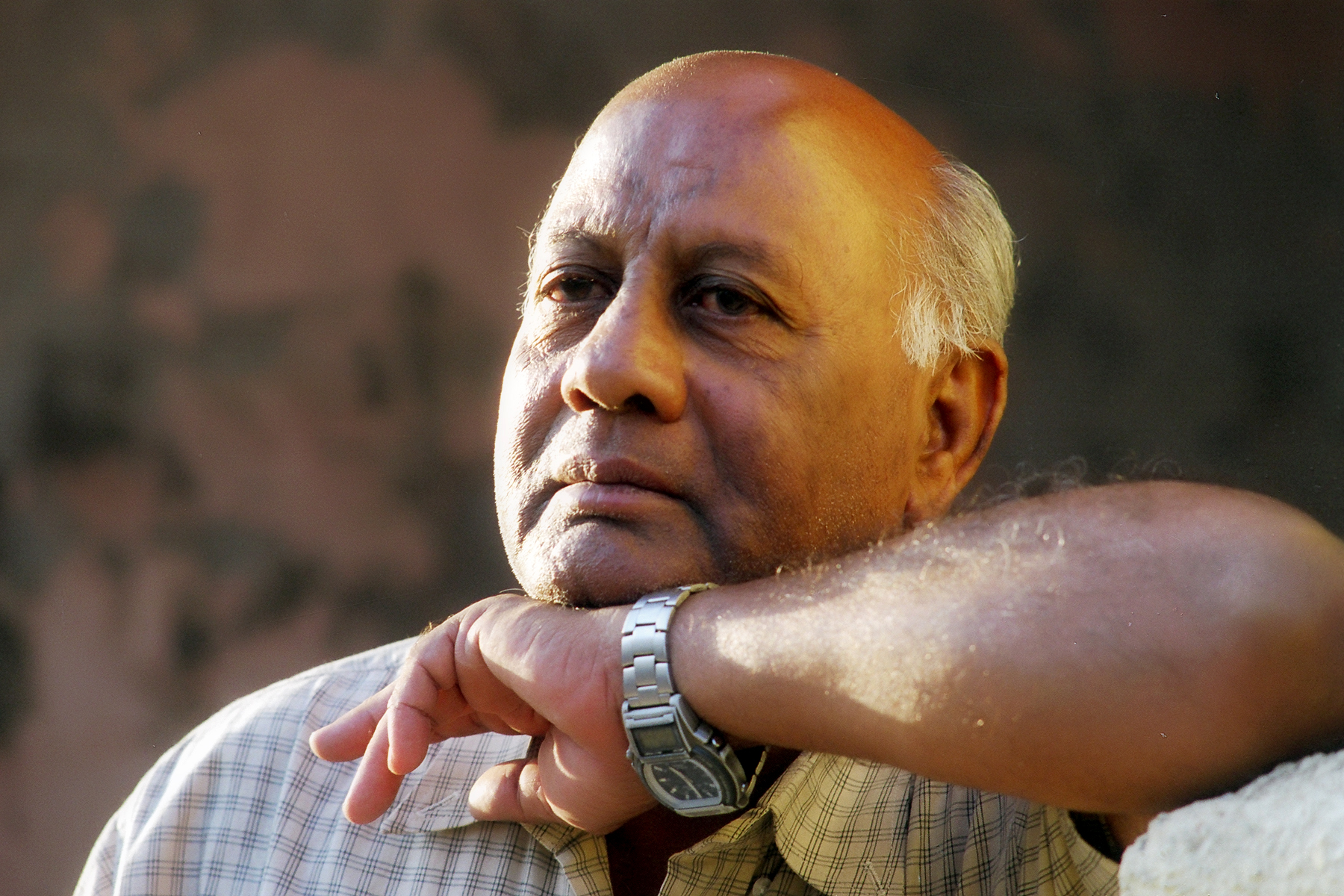
- Shah at Ahmedabad on 8 July 2006
- Born: 29 December 1936; Bantva, Junagadh district, Gujarat
- Died: 22 January 2020 (aged 83); Ahmedabad
- Education: Master of Arts
- Alma mater: Bahauddin College, Junagadh
- Occupations: Professor, poet, novelist, short story writer, playwright
- Spouse: Ruta Shah (m. 1963)
- Writing career
- Pen name: Niranjan Sarkar
- Language: Gujarati
- Period: Modern Gujarati literature
- Notable work: Asti (1966)

Shrikant Vallabhdas Shah (29 December 1936 – 22 January 2020) was a Gujarati poet, novelist, short story writer and playwright from Gujarat, India, mainly known for his experimental novel Asti (1966).

== Biography ==
He was born on 29 December 1936 in Bantva, a town in Junagadh district of Gujarat, to Vallabhdas and Vasantbahen. He completed schooling in his village Bantva. He completed Bachelor of Arts in 1959 and Master of Arts in 1961 from Bahauddin College, Junagadh with Psychology Subject.

He started his career as lecturer at H. K. Arts College, Ahmedabad in 1962-63. Thereafter, he served as an employment officer at Jamnagar, a manager of Jansatta daily at Rajkot and general manager of Jansatta at Ahmedabad. He retired as lecturer from Vivekanand College, Ahmedabad.

He married Ruta Shah on 9 November 1963, and they had a daughter and a son. He resided in Ahmedabad.

He died on 22 January 2020.

== Work ==
He started writing under pseudonym Niranjan Sarkar.

In 1962, he published his first collection of poems Ek and wrote his existentialist novel Asti which was published in 1966, followed by mystery novel Trijo Manas. Tirad ane Bija Natako, Negative, Canvas Par Na Chahera, ...Ane Hu and Aekant Number 80 are his plays. In 2003, his poetry collection Ek Manasnu Nagar was published with the preface written by Gujarati author Niranjan Bhagat. Some of his books are awarded by Gujarati Sahitya Parishad and Gujarat Sahitya Akademi.

Asti is his experimental novel which is considered as his attempt of modern novel. The novel does not have any plot and is centred around an unnamed individual addressed as “Te” (lit. He) who passes through ugly experience of existence and desires death.
