= Grihapravesha =

House-entering ceremony in Hinduism

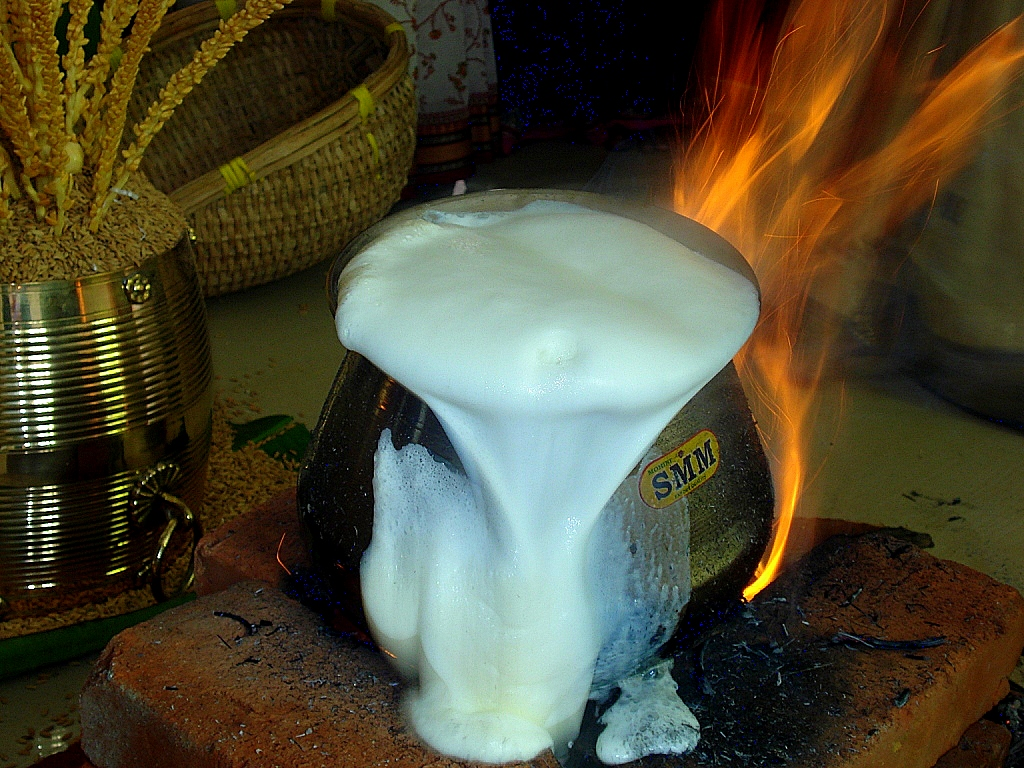
Boiling over of milk, a grihapravesha ritual

Grihapravesha (Sanskrit: गृहप्रवेश, romanized: Gṛhapravēśa, lit. 'entrance into a house') is a Hindu traditional housewarming ceremony performed when moving into a new home. The ritual is believed to purify the house, invite prosperity, and seek divine blessings for the residents. It is an essential part of Hindu culture, especially in India and Nepal, and is performed following auspicious astrological timings. This ceremony is similar in nature to a housewarming party. This ritual has several variants in its name in Indian languages

- Gruha Pravesh in Sanskrit: गृह प्रवेश, Hindi: गृह प्रवेश, Marathi: गृह प्रवेश and Gujarati: ગૃહ પ્રવેશ
- Griho Probesh in Bengali: গৃহ প্রবেশ
- Graha Pravesam in Tamil: கிரகப்பிரவேசம்,
- Gruha Pravesam in Malayalam: ഗൃഹപ്രവേശം and Telugu: గృహ ప్రవేశం
- Gruha Pravesha in Kannada: ಗೃಹ ಪ್ರವೇಶ

The activities performed during Grihapravesha are said to have been described in the ancient text, Matsya Purana. Through these rituals, it is believed that the evil spirits inhabiting the new house are driven out while also invoking gods to obtain their blessings and thank them for the new house. The puja (prayer ritual) of this ceremony is performed in various stages during the construction and entry of the house. Once the home is ready, an adherent is described the muhurta (auspicious period) to conduct the puja, in consultation with an astrologer or a Hindu priest. The rite of vastu shanti is generally performed by a priest, done to propitiate the benevolent deities associated with the household and to ward away evil spirits. According to Vaastu Shastra, a house is made up of five elements, namely, fire, water, earth, air, and sky. Performing Griha Pravesh Puja is beneficial in bringing happiness to the new house.

== Types ==
According to the Vastu Shashtra, the grihapravesha is prescribed in three forms:

- Apurva, which is performed upon the first entry into a newly constructed home
- Sampurva, which is done when an individual enters the home after arriving from a foreign land
- Dvandva, which is done when the individual enters the home after reconstruction or renovation
