= Harish Nagrecha =

Gujarati playwright, short story writer

- Born: 25 December 1934; Karachi, Pakistan
- Died: 22 July 2009 (aged 74)
- Education: B. A., Diploma in Journalism
- Alma mater: Bharatiya Vidya Bhavan
- Occupations: playwright, short story writer
- Writing career
- Language: Gujarati
- Notable work
- Notable awards: Uma-Snehrashmi Prize (2006–2007)

Harish Nagrecha (25 December 1934 – 22 July 2009) was an Indian Gujarati language writer.

== Biography ==
Harish Hemraj Nagrecha was born on 25 December 1934 at Karachi, Pakistan in Lohana family. His native place was Jodiya, Jamnagar, Gujarat, India. He completed his primary education at Karachi and moved to Mumbai after Partition of India. He completed his B.A. in statistics at Mumbai. In 1964, He completed Diploma in Journalism from the Bharatiya Vidya Bhavan.

He died on 22 July 2009.

== Works ==
Nagrecha was a playwright and short story writer. His first story collection Tu Bol Ne! was published in 1990. Ane Chhata Pan... (1998), Hello Surya (2002) and Ek Kshan No Unmad (2007) are his other story collections. He wrote his first play Ek Lalni Rani in 1999. Khodiyo Suraj (2000) was One-act play. Meghadhanushno Mahel (2005) and Terve Atakya Bol (2007) are his other plays. Dasto... Pinjar... Khal... Kabutar (2005) was a teleplay.

== Recognition ==
He received the Best Story award from Kumar in 1967. In 1999, he received the Dhumketu Navlika Puraksar for his story collection Ane Chhata Pan.... He was presented the Nandashankar Chandrak for his work Hello Surya. He received the Uma-Snehrashmi Prize (2006–2007) for his story collection Ek Kshan No Unmad.

His plays Ek Lalni Rani and Dasto... Pinjar... Khal... Kabutar were awarded by Gujarat Sahitya Akademi, Khodiyo Suraj (One-act play) was awarded by Gujarati Sahitya Parishad and Terve Atakya Bol was awarded by Maharashrta Rajya Gujarati Sahitya Akademi.

== See also ==
- List of Gujarati-language writers
