= Umashankar Joshi =

Indian poet, scholar and writer (1911–1988)

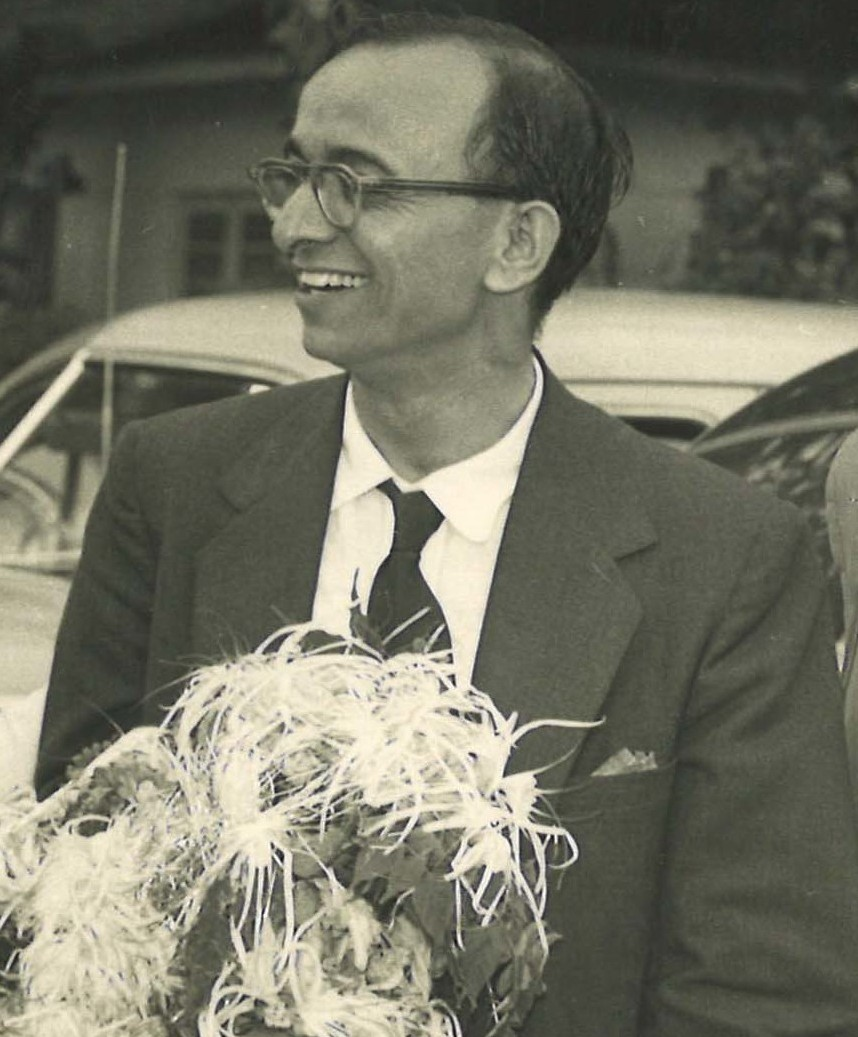
- Joshi in 1960, Mumbai
- Born: 21 July 1911; Bamna, Sabarkantha, Bombay presidency, British India
- Died: 19 December 1988 (aged 77); Mumbai, Maharashtra, India
- Education: Gujarat College; Elphinstone College
- Occupations: Poet, Novelist, Short story writer
- Writing career
- Pen name: Vasuki, Shravan
- Period: Gandhian Era
- Notable awards: Ranjitram Suvarna Chandrak (1939); Narmad Suvarna Chandrak (1943); Uma-Snehrashmi Prize (1963-64-65); Sahitya Academy Award (1973)

Academic work
- Doctoral students: Ramanlal Joshi
- Website: Official website

Umashankar Jethalal Joshi (21 July 1911 – 19 December 1988) was an Indian poet, scholar and writer known for his contributions to Gujarati literature. He wrote most of his works in Gujarati.

== Biography ==
=== Early years ===
Umashankar Joshi was born to Jethalal Kamalji and Navalbai in a small village named Bamna (now in Bhiloda Taluka of Aravalli district, Gujarat). He had eight siblings including six brothers and two sisters.

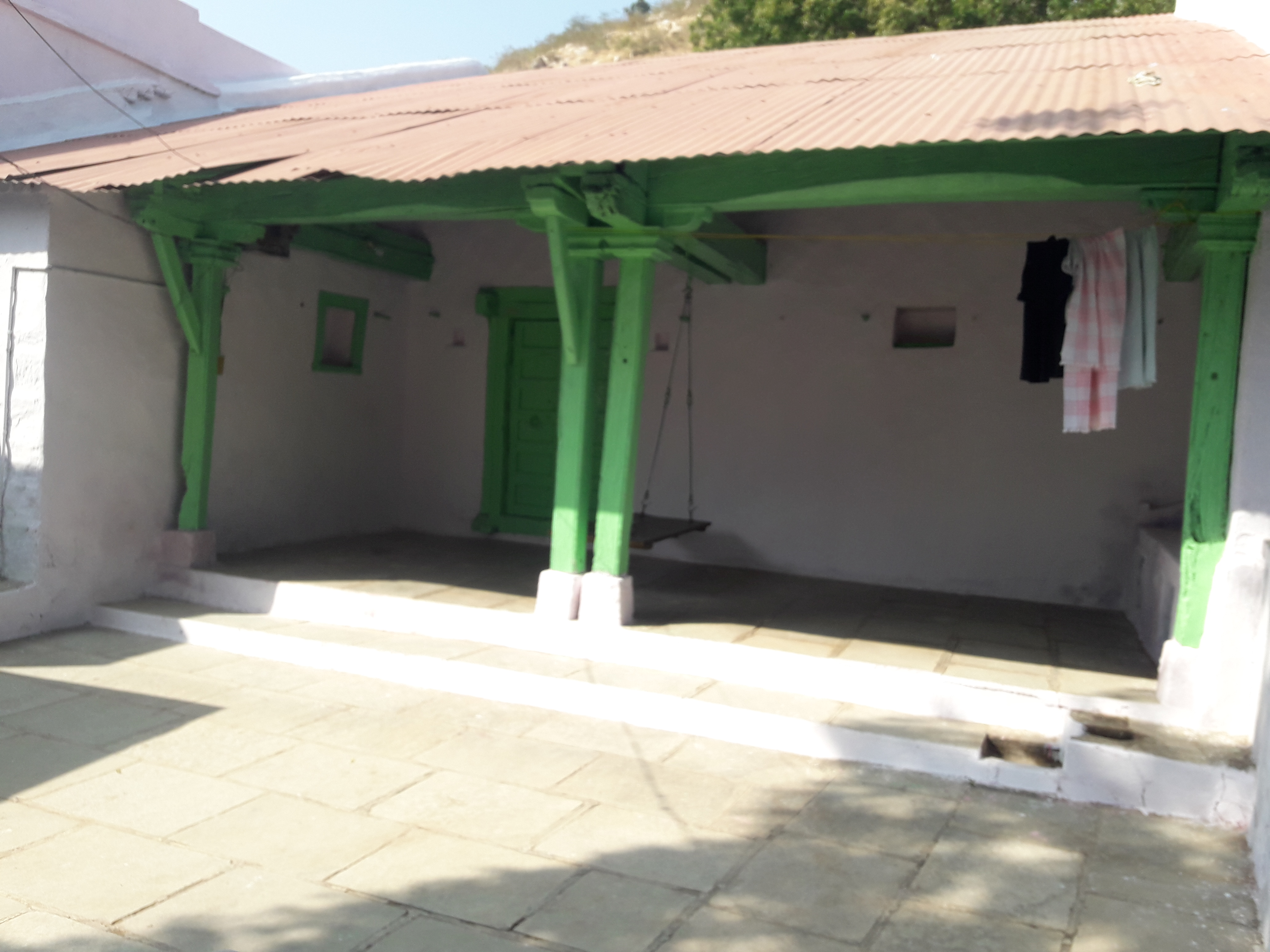
Joshi's birthplace in Bamna, Gujarat

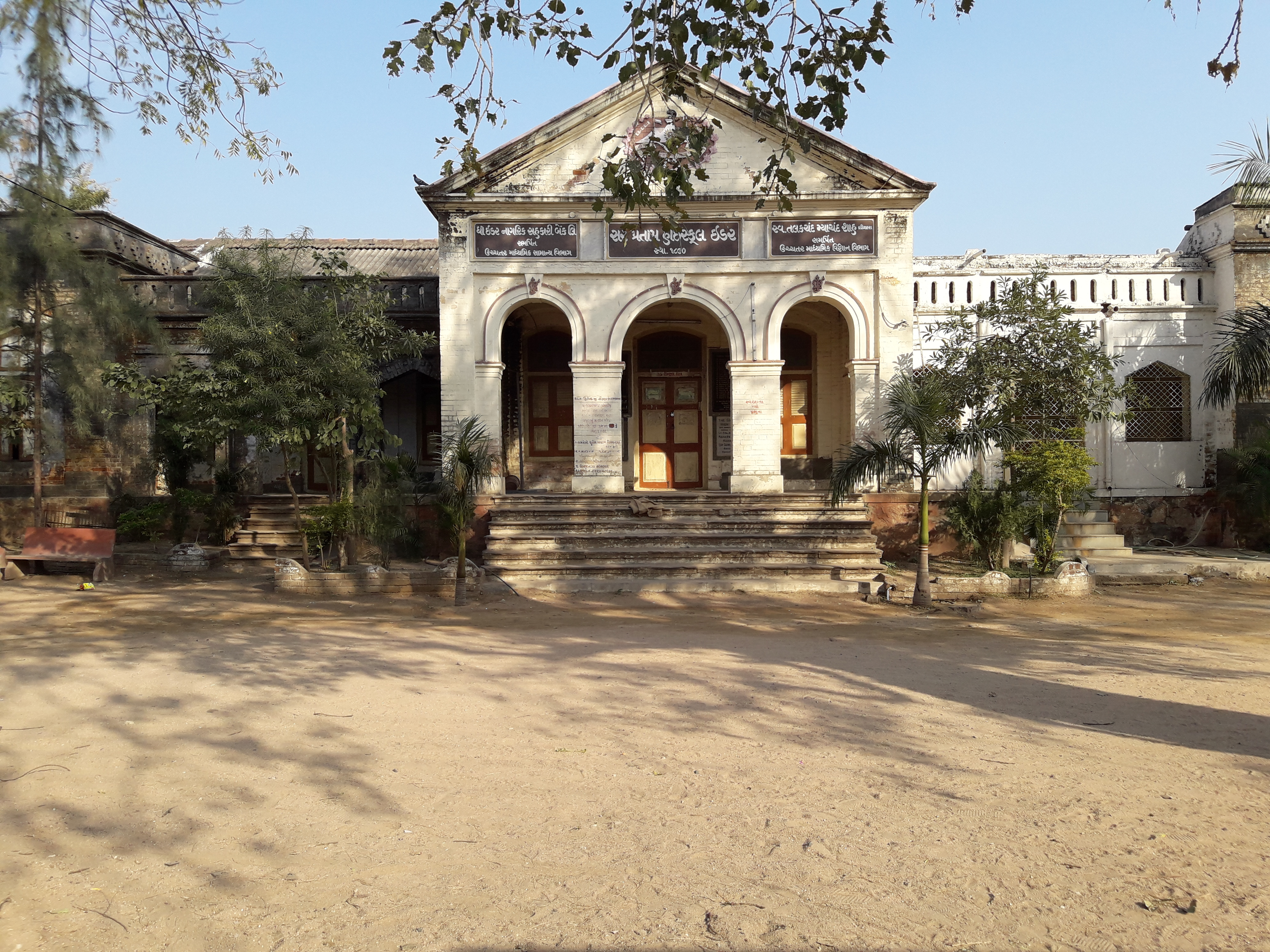
Sir Pratap High School of Idar where Joshi studied until 1927

Umashankar Joshi's father, Jethalal who worked as a Karbhari of several Jagirs, wanted his sons to get an English education. In 1916, Joshi started his education at Primary school in Bamna and spent two years in 4th standard due to the absence of the teacher for a long time. Upon learning this Jethalal joined Joshi in Sir Pratap High School of Idar. As a boy who was raised in an orthodox environment, Joshi always heard "highly sensitive and expressive language" which shaped his future style, especially in writing plays. As a child, he had excursions to hilly areas of Aravalli and visits to colorful monsoon fairs in and around Bamna. This village life left a profound impact on his language and developed "lyrical vein" in him.

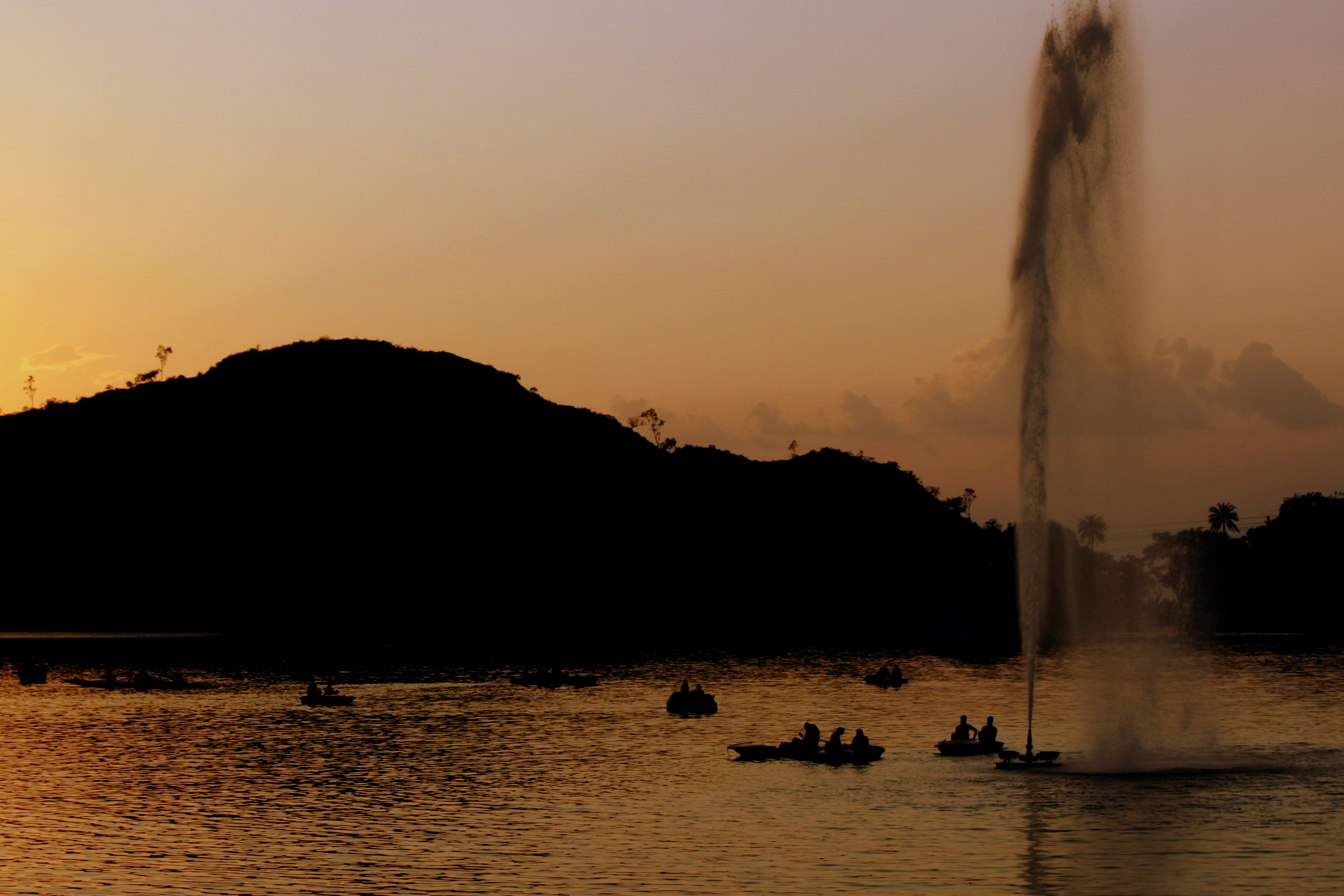
Nakki Lake on top of Mount abu that inspired Umashankar Joshi to write his first-ever published poem

In Sir Pratap High School, Idar, Joshi continued his studies until 1927 for 6 years. He joined Proprietary High School in Ahmedabad for his matriculation in 1927. Joshi considered reaching Ahmedabad to pursue higher education was a major breakthrough for him. Ahmedabad was then part of British India while Idar and Bamna were under princely rule of Idar state. Ahmedabad introduced Joshi to Gujarati literature. This city also helped raise his social and political consciousness. In 1928, Joshi joined Gujarat College, Ahmedabad. He continued his studies there until he left British education under National movement influence in 1930.

The village environment in which Joshi spent his childhood gave him inspiration for his poetry in his college days. The earliest of his published poems was written when Joshi was 17 when he had just completed matriculation and joined Gujarat college. Joshi along with two other friends climbed Mount Abu, the highest peak in the Aravalli mountain range to watch the moon rise over Nakki Lake on the mountain. After a joyous journey to the hilltop, the autumnal fall moon and the lake inspired Joshi to write his first-ever published poem. The poem, Nakhee Sarovare Sarat poornimaa (Tr: Autumnal full moon at Nakki Lake) which was published in Gujarat college magazine, describes writing poetry in a stanza:

Saundar yo pee
urajharan gaashe pachhee aapmele

Drink (the cup of) beauty
Heart will, then, flow singing, automatically.

=== Independence activist and young poet ===
In January 1929, Joshi participated in a strike called by students of Gujarat Schools and colleges and this marked his first association with ongoing National movement in India. On 26 December 1929 in Lahore sessions, congress declared that Purna Swaraj (Complete Independence) was their mission. Gandhi and Purna swaraj declaration inspired Joshi to become a Satyagrahi. In April 1930, Joshi joined Viramgam satyagraha camp as a Satyagrahi. British officials arrested him along with other Satyagrahis in November 1930. He was imprisoned initially in Sabarmati jail, and later in Yerwada tent-jail. This initial imprisonment extended up to 14 weeks. As a result of Gandhi–Irwin Pact, Joshi was also released with thousands of political prisoners in early 1931. He attended Karachi conference held in March 1931. Joshi attended classes in Gujarat Vidyapith from July for six months. In 1932, Joshi was again imprisoned for eight months period at Sabarmati and Visapur jails.

Joshi penned his first poetry work Vishwa Shanti in 1931 in the jail. Vishwa Shanti is a long poem and it "refers to Gandhi's message and Lifework". This work expresses the poet's idea that "Even if Bapu's visit to the west is directed towards Indian independence, it will bring more effectively the message of peace to the West than Independence to [Indian] Nation". Although Joshi was strongly influenced by Gandhi's life and message, he never tried to be associated with Mahatma Gandhi personally or politically. Joshi briefly met Gandhi in 1936 when Gandhi was presiding over Gujarati Literary Conference as a delegate and member. Even though the meeting was "exciting" Joshi never tried to meet Gandhi again. Between 1930 and 1934, when Joshi was participating in the Independence struggle, he wrote several poems, plays, articles, novels, and stories in Gujarati. During this period, his jail mate was another contemporary Gujarati poet Tribhuvandas Luhar "Sundaram". Both of them wrote in the same copy book and shared love for nation and being a global citizen. In 1934, Umashankar referred to Sundaram that "We are twin brothers. In the fulfilment of our creative urge, the Gujarati language has perhaps conspired to tie us together at its very root without our knowledge of it". This collaboration has a lasting impact on their philosophy and style.

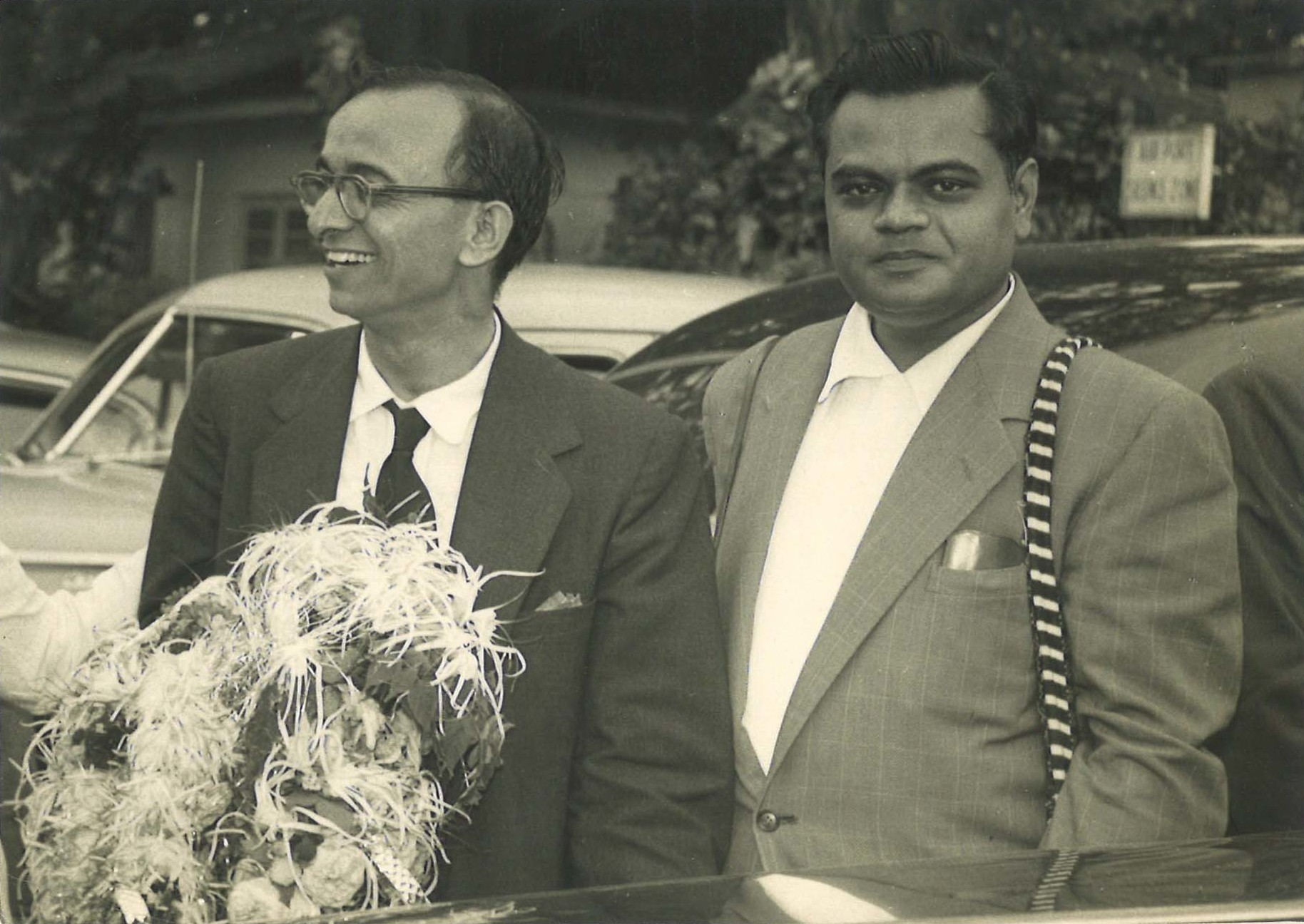
Umashankar Joshi (left) with Chunilal Madia at Mumbai, 1960

Joshi's father died in 1934. Civil disobedience movement was called off by Mahatma Gandhi. Joshi joined Elphinstone College to continue his studies. By the time he joined Elphinstone College to pursue Graduation in arts, his works were in the school curriculum and he became established writer in Gujarati literature. In 1934, Gangotri, the anthology of Joshi's poems written during 1932-34 was published. In 1936, Joshi started writing one-act plays and published them in a collection called Sapna Bharathi. These works were popular on stage.

In Gujarati literature, Joshi was also credited as a writer who initiated Progressive literary movement. He was also an active part of pan-Indian progressive writers' movement. In 1936, he took active part in establishing "Progressive writers' association". Joshi's imprisonment in Yerwada jail during 1931 gave him an opportunity to study Socialism and Marxism as many inmates who were influenced by Socialism gave him books and discussed concepts. In jail, he read Jawaharlal Nehru's account and Tagore's letters on their visit to Russia, Maurice Hindus's Humanity Uprooted, and Karl Marx's Das Kapital. According to Joshi, the impact of Marx and socialism on him was emotional and evoked a strong feeling of equality and social justice. Along with Gandhian principles, Joshi's poetry from the early 1930s also reflects his socialistic influences. Joshi considered Jatharagni (1932), Panchali (1932) and Mochi (1933) as examples of his poems that reflect Marxist influence. Dhirubhai Thaker has observed that Joshi "challenged the establishment in a restrained but a threatening tone." In Gangotri and following poem exemplified it:

Racho racho ambarchumbee gumbajo...
Bhookhyaan janona jatharaagni jaagashe...
Khandernee bhasmakanee na laadhashe

Build, build, you may, the domes of skyscrapers,
when the fire of hunger of the hungry flares up,
will you not find an iota of the remnants burnt.

But, Joshi was not associated with Marxism. Joshi stated that "I am not a Gandhian nor a Marxian" and "Thank god! Gandhi was not a Gandhian, nor Marx a Marxist". Initially Joshi even felt that ideals of socialism - social justice and equality fitted very well with what Gandhi was already preaching and living for. In this period, Joshi along with his dearest friend and collaborator Sundaram led the young generation of writers who were associated with Freedom movement and also concerned about other social issues.

=== Academic career and marriage ===
On 25 May 1937, he married Jyotsna N. Joshi in Ahmedabad. He got a job as a teacher at Goklibai High school, Mumbai in 1937. He passed Master of Arts with Gujarati and Sanskrit subjects in First class at Mumbai University. He started working as a part-time lecturer at Sydenham College of Commerce, Mumbai. In 1939, he was appointed in Gujarat Vidyasabha as a professor in the postgraduate research studies department. During this period, where Joshi was a student and the household tried establishing in Mumbai, a vast and modern city, the struggle of city life came into his poetry. While the first poem in Joshi's poetry anthology Nishith was written while aboard an electric train at midnight, on a blank space left in a letter, Joshi said that not only the meter of Vedic invocations but also the rhythm of the electric train creep into the structure of the poem. Joshi published Nishith as an anthology of these poems in 1939. He received the Jnanpith award for this work 29 years later in 1968.

The Progressive literature movement which was initiated by him lost its impact by the 1940s in Gujarati literature. Joshi also disassociated from progressivism. According to Joshi, this shift is due to several reasons: shift in political interests because of World war II, progressive poetry movement resulting in degeneration of style and aesthetic interests, and the rise of a new kind of poetry in Gujarati led by young poets like Prahlad Parekh. Joshi in search of new voice in his poetry, started a new genre, called dramatic poetry, in the 1940s. Sanskrit drama literature and Puranas inspired him to start this new genre. In 1944, he wrote seven dramatic poems and published them under the name "Pracheena".

From April 1944 to September 1946, he edited one of the oldest monthly magazines of Gujarati "Buddhiprakash. In 1946, he voluntarily retired from Gujarat Vidyasabha and in a later year he started a monthly magazine "Sanskriti". He continued running this monthly until 1984. This magazine was considered prestigious. Umashankar Joshi along with his wife Jyotsna Joshi started "Gangotri Trust" in 1955 which was intended to support the publication of "Sanskriti". The trust also undertook a project of translating texts from Indian and foreign languages into Gujarati with the support from ‘Nisheeth Purskar Granth Mala’. Bombay State government appointed him as member of Gujarati textbook committee in 1948. In 1953, he served as a visiting faculty at Lokbharti Shikshan Sanstha which was an educational institution in Sanosara, Bhavnagar district, Gujarat.

Umashankar Joshi also contributed to literary criticism of Gujarati literature. He wrote prefaces to works of many contemporary poets like Prahlad Parekh, Krishnalal Shridharani, Nathalal Dave and others. He tried to assess the characteristics and traits of New Wave literature and historical context to that through his critical essays.

=== Rise to prominence ===
In March 1954, Umashankar Joshi was appointed Member of the General Council and the executive committee of Sahitya Akademi from its inception. In June, he was appointed professor of Gujarati literature at Gujarat University. He was also appointed the head of School of languages in that university. Joshi continued to work in the same university until his retirement in 1972. In 1956, he toured America and England as a member of a committee sent by the Indian Government to study the activities of 'General Education' in American and some British universities. In 1964, he became a member of a committee appointed by the Government of Gujarat for the establishment of South Gujarat and Saurashtra universities. In 1964, Joshi presided over convention of "Gujarat Sahitya Parishad" in Delhi. From 30 November 1966: he was Vice-Chancellor of Gujarat University and worked in this position until 1972.

His early works have an influence of strong nationalism and Gandhian ideals of peace and non-violence. Although Joshi had a nationalistic background, his works also had themes of "Unity with the world and every human being". In 1956, there was a shift in his philosophy from Gandhian era and its principles to a disparity of modern life. His poem Chinnabhinna cchu (I am scattered) reflected this change in his philosophy. M. V. Desai considered that Chinnabhinna cchu and Shodh (The search) poems "mark a milestone depicting a sense of disintegration of the human personality and of seeking poetic beauty in words." Indra Nath Choudhuri proposed this "manifestation of notes of despair emerging from sense of helplessness" is part of a wider phenomenon seen in Indian poets from the mid-1950s like Faiz Ahmad Faiz (Urdu), Jibanananda Das, Navakanta Barua, Agyeya, etc. Although his literature from the post-1950s started expressing disparity it also possesses the values of unity of humankind and peace that he expressed in the early 30s. As early as 1945 and 1947, Joshi's poetry started expressing his disillusionment and disparity arising from events of that decade. After the Hiroshima and Nagasaki attacks, Joshi questioned how victory came from such devastation in his poem:

Rudhir janmavaamaan ja ten vahaavyun ah ketalun?

Alas, what profuse blood-shed at your very birth?

In 1956, Joshi stated that his collections, Hriday Ma Padeli Chhabio (Images Imprinted in the Heart) and Ishamishida Ane Anya are the character sketches of the literary and historical figures whom he had met.

=== Old age, awards, and death ===
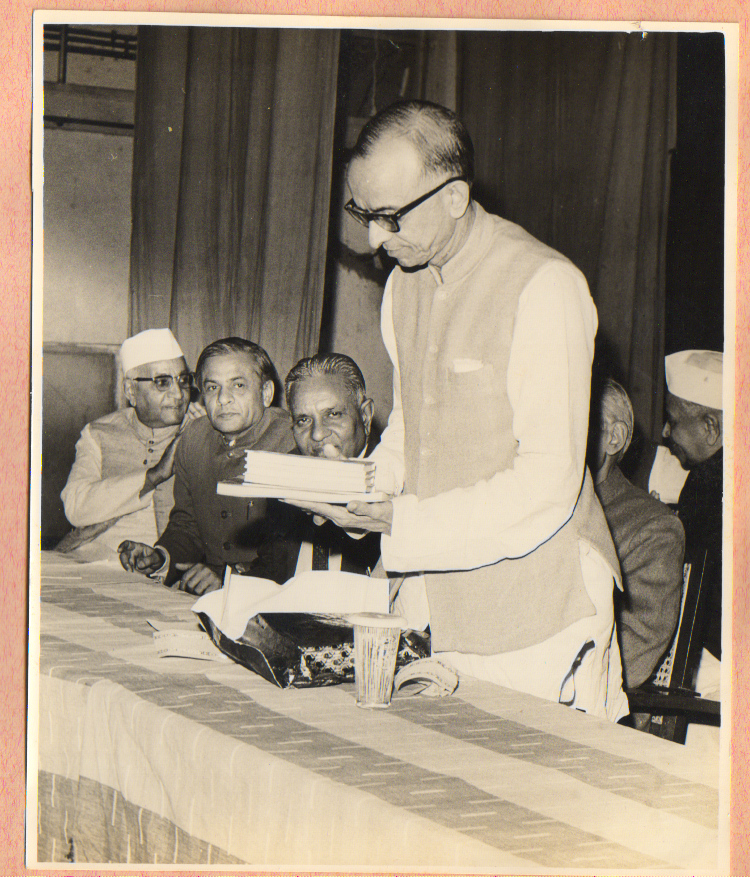
Umashankar Joshi inaugurating Jaybhikhkhu Commemoration Volume, December 1970; from left to second is Dhirubhai Thaker

Umashankar Joshi received the Jnanpith Award for his work Nishanth along with Kannada poet K.V.Puttapa (for Ramayana Darsana) in 1967. In his acceptance speech, Umashankar Joshi reiterated his belief about Unity of national identity and world-mindedness by saying "What goes into the making of an Indian poet in the present-day world? His sharing the global anxiety and agony too. Paradoxically enough, the more world minded he is, the more Indian he will be, as one could see in the case of Tagore."

In 1970, Joshi was nominated to Rajya Sabha. Joshi became president of the Jnanpith Award committee in 1976 and Sahitya Akademi in 1978. He continued in the position of president of Sahitya Akademi from 1978 to 1983. During Emergency in India, Joshi showed his courage and commitment to his principles by advocating free speech in such an oppression. (Note: In his poem "Vasanth" He wrote: You say it is springtime But to the birds you say, be quiet By turning all of us into mirrors You are beholding only your beauty)

In 1988, he was admitted with lung cancer to Tata Memorial Hospital, Mumbai. He died on 19 December 1988 at the age of 77.

== Style ==
Umashankar Joshi is considered as one of the important literary figures of the 20th century Gujarati literature. He used Blank verse style in poetry. Joshi credited this technique to Gujarati poet and critic B. K. Thakore who introduced Blank verse sonnet to Gujarati poetry in the 1880s.

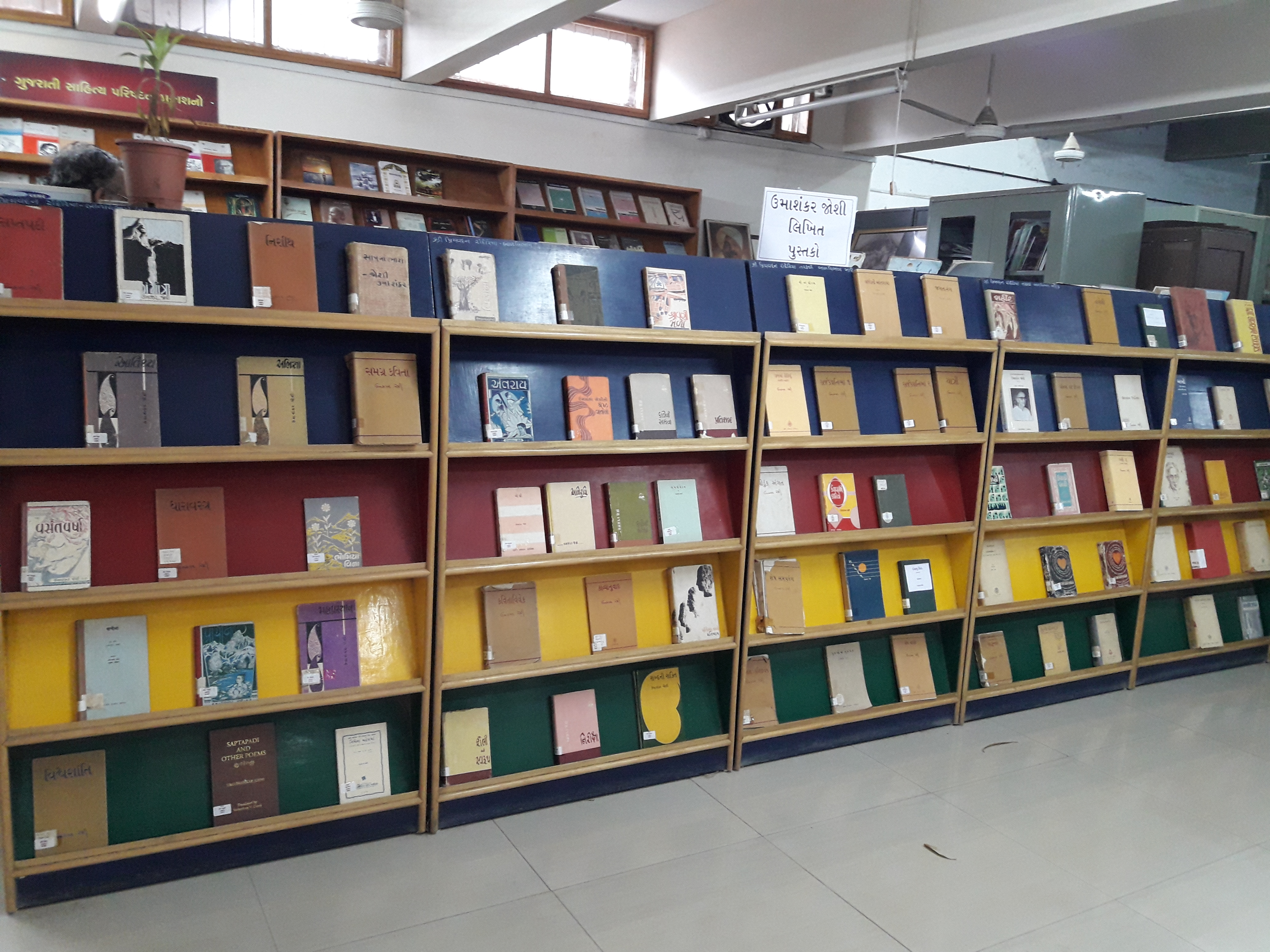
Exhibition of Umashankar Joshi's books at Gujarati Sahitya Parishad, July 2018

== List of works ==
His works include:

- Nishith ( નિશિથ ) – The God of Midnight (collection of poems)
- Gangotri ( ગંગોત્રી )
- Vishwashanti ( વિશ્વશાંતિ ) – World Peace
- Mahaprasthan ( મહાપ્રસ્થાન ) – Great Departure
- Abhigna ( અભિજ્ઞ ) – Recognition.
- Sanskruti – Editor of the magazine
- Visamo – collection of stories
- Haveli – collection of dramas
- Shravani Melo – collection of stories
- Akho : Ek Adhyayan
- "Shakuntal"- translation of Abhigyan Shakuntal of Kalidas
- "Uttar Ramcharit"- translation of Uttar Ramcharit of Bhavbhooti
- "Ishavaya Upanishad"- translation and commentary in Gujarati.
- "Gujarat Mori Mori Re"
- Mahaprasthan in Hindi translated by Mahavir Sinh Chauhan in 1997

== Influence and legacy ==
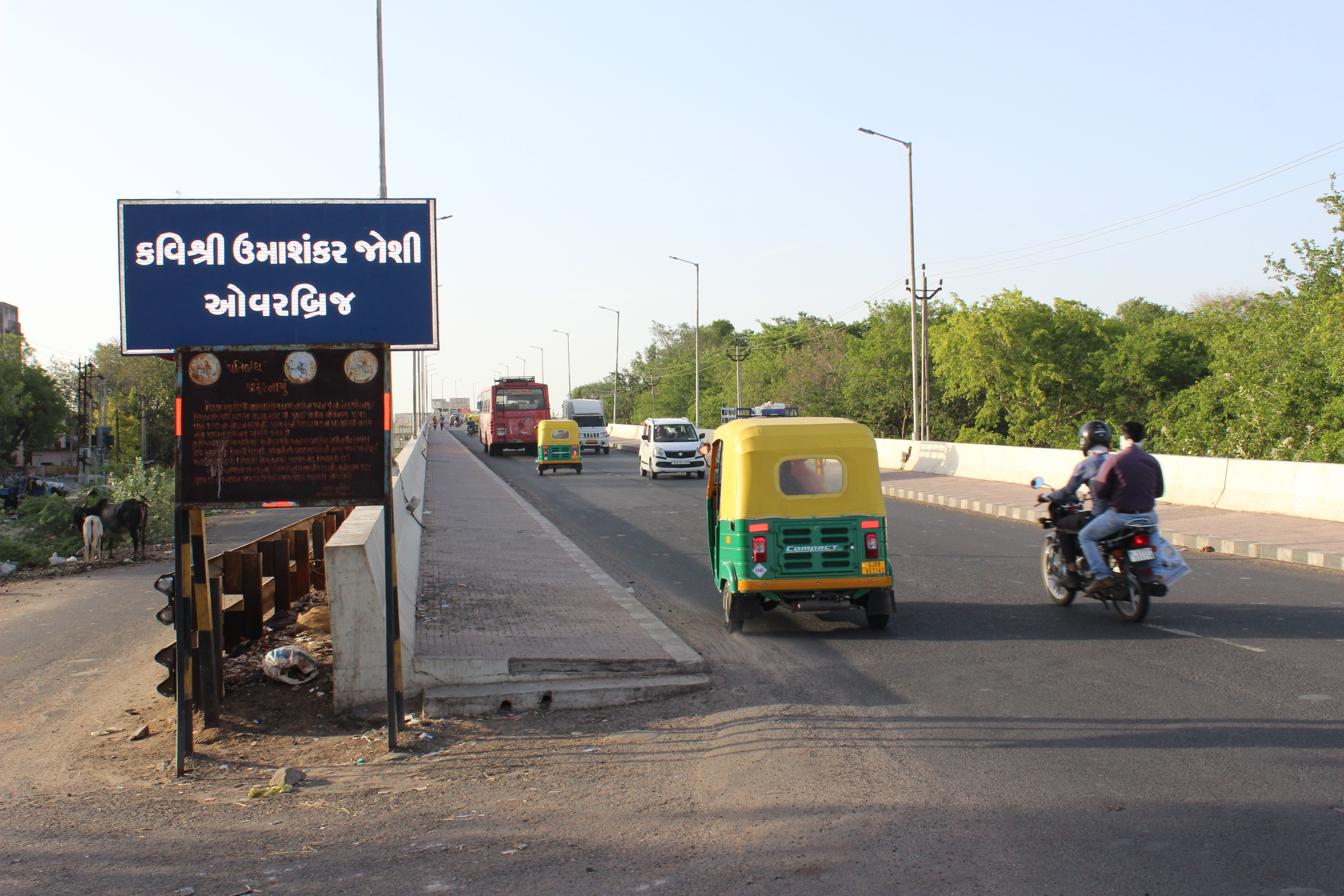
Poet Umashankar Joshi Over bridge in Himatnagar named after him

In Urdu literary journal Naya Adab, Ibham Rasheed called Joshi one of great writers of India and added that his "prose and poem delve into a space that tempts humans for deception and barbarity". Bholabhai Patel, a notable Gujarati writer and academician, was one of the students of Joshi in Gujarat University. Interaction and association with Joshi acted as touchstone for literary taste in Bholabhai Patel.

== Awards ==
- Jnanpith Award – 1968 for Nishith, a collection of his poems.
- Ranjitram Suvarna Chandrak – 1939
- Narmad Suvarna Chandrak – 1943
- Soviet Land Nehru Award – 1973
- Delhi Sahitya Academy Award
- Uma-Snehrashmi Prize - 1963-64-65p
- Vishwa Gurjari Gaurav Puraskar - 1981

== Positions held ==
- President – Gujarati Sahitya Parishad (1968)
- President – Sahitya Akademi (1978–1982)
- Vice-Chancellor – Gujarat University (1970)
- Member – Rajya Sabha, Upper House of the Indian Parliament
- first president of the Indian National Comparative Literature Association
