= Bamna =

Village

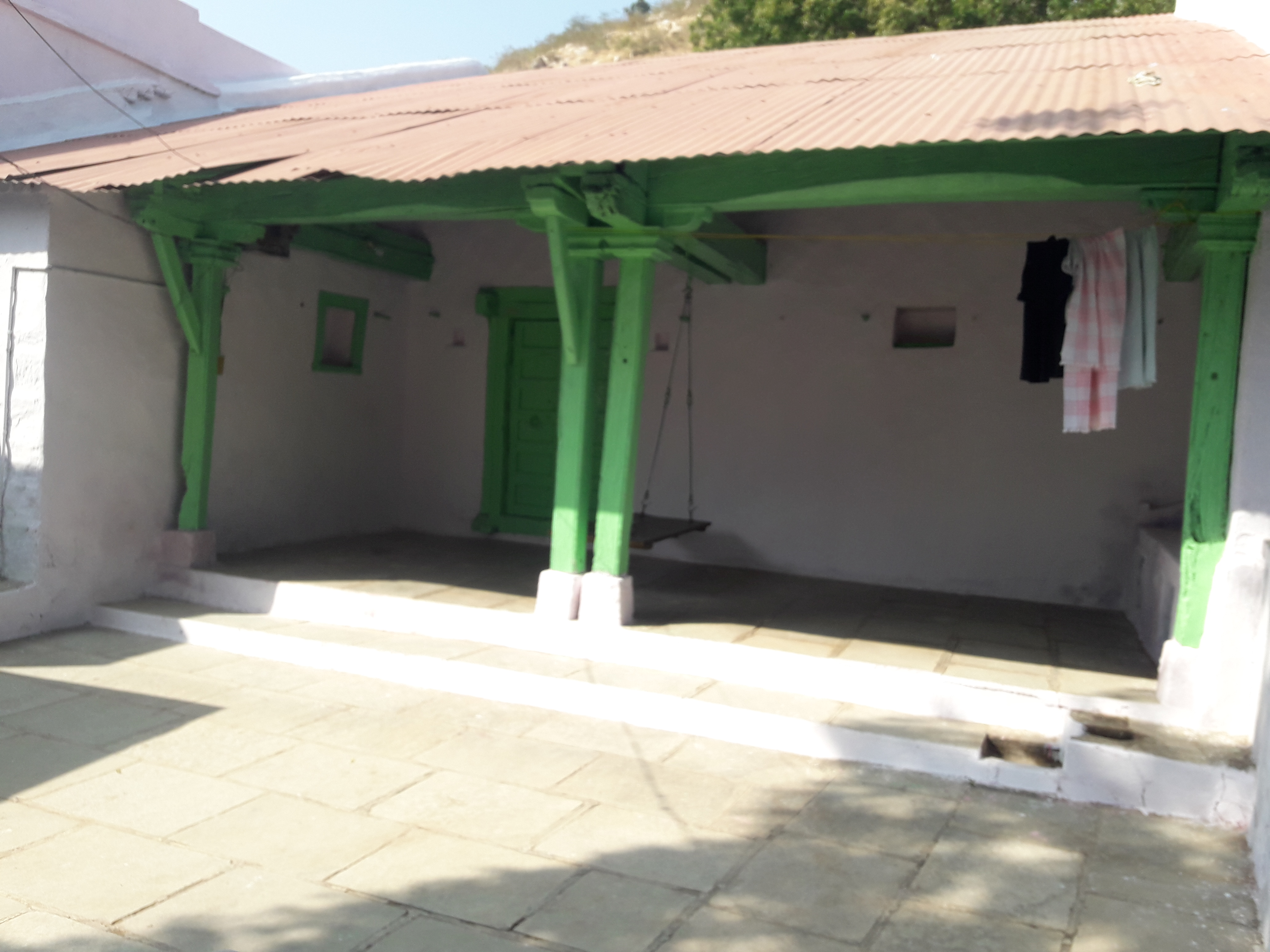
Birthplace of Umashankar Joshi in Bamna

Bamna is a locality village situated about 8 km south - west from its Taluka headquarters, Himatnagar and lies on the bank of Hatmati Dam. It falls under the Sabarkantha district Jurisdiction of Gujarat. It is well known as the village of great poet and gem of Gujarat Umashankar Joshi, a Gujarati literate, former President of Gujarati Sahitya Parishad.

== Demographic ==
It got its name from Brahmins who live there... The village consists of Hindu, Muslim, and Dalit families. There are also some tribes from pottery, blacksmith, tailors, etc. backgrounds. These people all live in harmony and peace

== Landmarks ==
- Bamna Somnath Mahadev Temple
- Verai Maa Mandir
- Bhatt Maganlal kalidas & Laxmiram Thrivedi Hospital
- Dena Bank
- Post Office
- Ganpati Mandir
- Sangamnath Mandir
- Brahmin Samaj Wadi
- Bajrangbali Mandir
- Hathmati Jalashay
- Ramkuva & Great Balia Mahadev Mandir
