= Ajavasnan Matsya =

Collection of poems by Pravin Pandya in Gujarati (1994)

- Coverpage of Ajavasnan Matsya
- Author: Pravin Pandya
- Language: Gujarati
- Series: Navya Kavi Shreni - 7
- Genre: free verse and metrical poems
- Set in: Ahmedabad
- Published: 1994
- Publisher: Kavilok Trust
- Publication date: May 1994
- Publication place: India
- Media type: Print
- Pages: 48
- Awards: Ushnas Prize (1994-95)
- Dewey Decimal: 891.471
- Followed by: Barda Na Dungar

Ajavasnan Matsya (Gujarati: અજવાસનાં મત્સ્ય) is the first collection of poems by Pravin Pandya in Gujarati. It was published by Kavilok Trust in May 1994.

== Content ==
The book consists of 19 poems, composed in both metrical and nonmetrical form. Pandya wrote the poems during 1979 to 1992.

== Award ==
The book won the Ushnas Prize (1994–95) instituted by Gujarati Sahitya Parishad.
