= Uma-Snehrashmi Prize =

- Uma-Snehrashmi Paritoshik
- Awarded for: Literary honor in Gujarat, India
- Sponsored by: Snehrashmi
- Date: 1963
- Location: Ahmedabad
- Country: India
- Presented by: Gujarati Sahitya Parishad
- First award: 1963
- Final award: 2013
- Currently held by: Harsh Brahmbhatt

Uma-Snehrashmi Prize, also known as Uma-Snehrashmi Paritoshik (Gujarati: ઉમા-સ્નેહરશ્મિ પારિતોષિક) is a literary award in Gujarat, India founded by Snehrashmi in 1963 in a remembrance of his deceased daughter Uma. Presented by Gujarati Sahitya Parishad, the award has been conferred every two years to the author of the most outstanding book in Gujarati language.

== Recipients ==
The Uma-Snehrashmi Prize has been granted every two years, since 1963, to the following people:

Year	Recipient	Book
1963-64-65	Umashankar Joshi	Mahaprasthan
1966-67	Ravji Patel	Zanjha
1968-69	Jayant Khatri	Khara Bapor
1970-71	Hiraben Pathak	Paraloke Patra
1972-73	Priyakant Maniar	Samip
1974-75	Raghuvir Chaudhari	Uparvas Navaltrayi
1976-77	Jagdish Joshi	Vamal Na Van
1978-79	Ramesh Parekh	Khading
1980-81	Rajendra Shukla	Antar Gandhar
1982-83	Jayant Pathak	Mrugaya
1984-85	Chandrakant Sheth	Dhoolmani Pagalio
1986-87	Nagindas Parekh	Gandhiji: Ketlak Swadhyaylekho
1988-89	Dinkar Joshi	Prakash No Padchhayo
1990-91	Sundaram	Varda
1992-93	Bakul Tripathi	Hindolo Zakamjhol
1994-95	Manilal H. Patel	Ratvaso
1996-97	Gunvant Shah	Billo Tillo Tach
1998-99	Dhruv Bhatt	Tatvamasi
2000-01	Mohan Parmar	Poth
2002-03	Narayan Desai	Maru Jivan Ae J Mari Vani (1-4)
2004-05	Madhusudan Dhanki	Shanimekhala
2006-07	Harish Nagrecha	Ek Kshan No Unmad
2008-09	Pravin Pandya	Barda Na Dungar
2010-11	Pravin Darji	Ansarkhi Rekhao
2012-13	Harsh Brahmbhatt	Jhakal Ne Tadka Ni Vachche
