= Barda Na Dungar =

Gujarati-language poetry collection written by Pravin Pandya (2009)

- Coverpage of Barda Na Dungar
- Author: Pravin Pandya
- Cover artist: Rupesh Dabhi
- Language: Gujarati
- Genre: free verse
- Set in: Ahmedabad
- Published: 2009
- Publisher: Kruti Prakashan
- Publication place: India
- Media type: Print
- Pages: 111
- Awards: Uma-Snehrashmi Prize (2008-09)
- Dewey Decimal: 891.471
- Preceded by: Ajavasnan Matsya

Barda Na Dungar, preceded by Ajavasnan Matsya, is a Gujarati language poetry collection written by Pravin Pandya. The book won Uma-Snehrashmi Prize (2008–09).

== Content ==
The book is consist of 23 poems which have been published in Kavilok, a Gujarati poetry journal, during 1994 to 2004.

== Award ==
The book was awarded by Uma-Snehrashmi Prize (2008–09) by Gujarati Sahitya Parishad.
