= Ushnas Prize =

- Shri Ushanas Paritoshik
- Awarded for: Literary honour in Gujarat, India
- Location: Ahmedabad
- Country: India
- Presented by: Gujarati Sahitya Parishad
- First award: 1982
- Final award: 2013
- Currently held by: Chandrakant Desai
- Website: gujaratisahityaparishad.com

Ushnas Prize, also known as the Shri Ushnas Paritoshik (Gujarati: શ્રી ઉશનસ્ પારિતોષિક), is a literary award presented in Gujarat, India, by the Gujarati Sahitya Parishad (Gujarati Literary Council). The award is named after the Gujarati poet Ushnas. The Ushnas Prize is conferred every two years to the poet who has authored the most outstanding long narrative poem or series of sonnets published during the previous two year period.

== Recipients ==
Following is the list of recipients.

| Year | Recipient | Poem |
|---|---|---|
| 1982-83 | Chinu Modi | Bahuk |
| 1984-85 | Sitanshu Yashaschandra | Pralay |
| 1986-87 | Chandrakant Sheth | Padgha Ni Pele Paar |
| 1988-89 | Yagnesh Dave | Jatismar |
| 1990-91 | Ramprasad Shukla | Samay Najarayo |
| 1992-93 | not awarded | not awarded |
| 1994-95 | Pravin Pandya | Ajavasnan Matsya |
| 1996-97 | Manilal H. Patel | Dungar Kori Ghar Karya |
| 1998-99 | Bhanuprasad Pandya | Shabde Korya Shilp |
| 2000-01 | Nalin Raval | Mery Go Round |
| 2002-03 | Udayan Thakker | Sellara |
| 2004-05 | not awarded | not awarded |
| 2006-07 | Yogesh Joshi | Jesalmer |
| 2008-09 | Rajesh Pandya | Samudra Kavyo |
| 2010-11 | Urvish Vasavda | Girnar Saad Pade |
| 2012-13 | Chandrakant Desai | Sonetanjali |
