= Jagdish Joshi (poet) =

Indian poet

- Born: Jagdish Ramkrishna Joshi; 9 October 1932; Mumbai, India
- Died: 21 September 1978 (aged 45); Mumbai
- Education: St. Xavier's College, Mumbai; Stanford University
- Occupations: Poet and translator
- Spouse: Anila Badheka
- Writing career
- Language: Gujarati
- Period: modern Gujarati literature
- Genres: free verse, ghazal, Geet
- Notable work: Vamal Na Van (1976)
- Notable awards: Uma-Snehrashmi Prize (1976-1977); Sahitya Akademi Award (1979)

Jagdish Ramkrishna Joshi (9 October 1932 – 21 September 1978) was a Gujarati poet and translator from India. He received a posthumous Sahitya Akademi Award in 1979 for his collection of poems, Vamal Na Van.

== Early life ==
Joshi was born in Bombay to Annapurna and Ramakrishna Joshi. He matriculated in 1949 and completed a Bachelor of Arts in Gujarati and Sanskrit in 1953 from St. Xavier's College, Mumbai. He completed an M.D. in Pedagogy in 1955 from Stanford University. He served as a principal of Bazar Gate High School, Mumbai from 1957 to 1960.

He served as a member of the educational committee and The Editorial Board of the Secondary and Higher Secondary Education Board, Pune, from 1965 to 1977. Later, he served as treasurer of the Bombay Association of Hades and Secondary School, as vice-president in 1969, and as president in 1970. He was a member of the University of Bombay senate from 1969 to 1975. From 1974 to 1978, he served as a member of the Board of Studies in Gujarati at SNDT Women's University.

== Works ==
Aakash, his first collection of poems, was published in 1972, followed by Vamal Na Van (1976) and Monta Collage (1979; posthumous). Vamal Na Van set a new trend in experimental Gujarati poems. The central emotion in his poems is pathos, depicted with rural milieu and colloquial style. In his non-metrical poems, he used rhythmic diction. In all, Joshi wrote 114 poems: 57 geets, 38 non-metrical poems, 14 ghazals and 5 metrical poems. "Ek Hati Sarvakalin Varta" is one critically acclaimed poem from this collection.

Joshi co-edited Vartani Pankhe (1972), Vartani Moj (3 Vol.; 1972), Hu To Nitya Pravasi (1973), Varta Re Varta (3 Vol.; 1973) and Sulabh Samoohjivan (3 Vol.; 1974). In 1973 he published the translation of Understanding Poetry, a work by British writer James Reeves, titling it Kavitani Gatagam, in Gujarati poetry journal Kavita. He translated poems from various languages into Gujarati, most of which were published in Kavita, Sanskruti and Kavyavishwa. Two of his most famous translations are Marathi Kavita - Gres (1978) and Suryaghatikayantra (1981, posthumous). His poetry reviews were published in Ekantni Sabha (1978; posthumous). Dharo Ke Ek Sanje Aapne Malya, a volume of his complete poetry edited by Suresh Dalal, was published in 1998.

== Recognition ==
He was awarded the Uma-Snehrashmi Prize (1976–1977) and Sahitya Akademi Award (1979) for his book Vamal Na Van. He also received the Mahakavi Nhanalal Prize in 1977 for the same book.

== Personal life ==
Joshi married Anila Devshankar Badheka in 1953. Their first daughter, Sandhya, was born in 1954 and their second daughter, Aparna, was born in 1960. Their son, Abhijit was born in 1968.

Joshi fell into a coma owing to a cerebral hemorrhage on the midnight of 31 August 1978 and died on 21 September 1978 in Mumbai.
