= Udayan Thakker =

Indian Gujarati-language poet, writer and translator (Born: 1955)

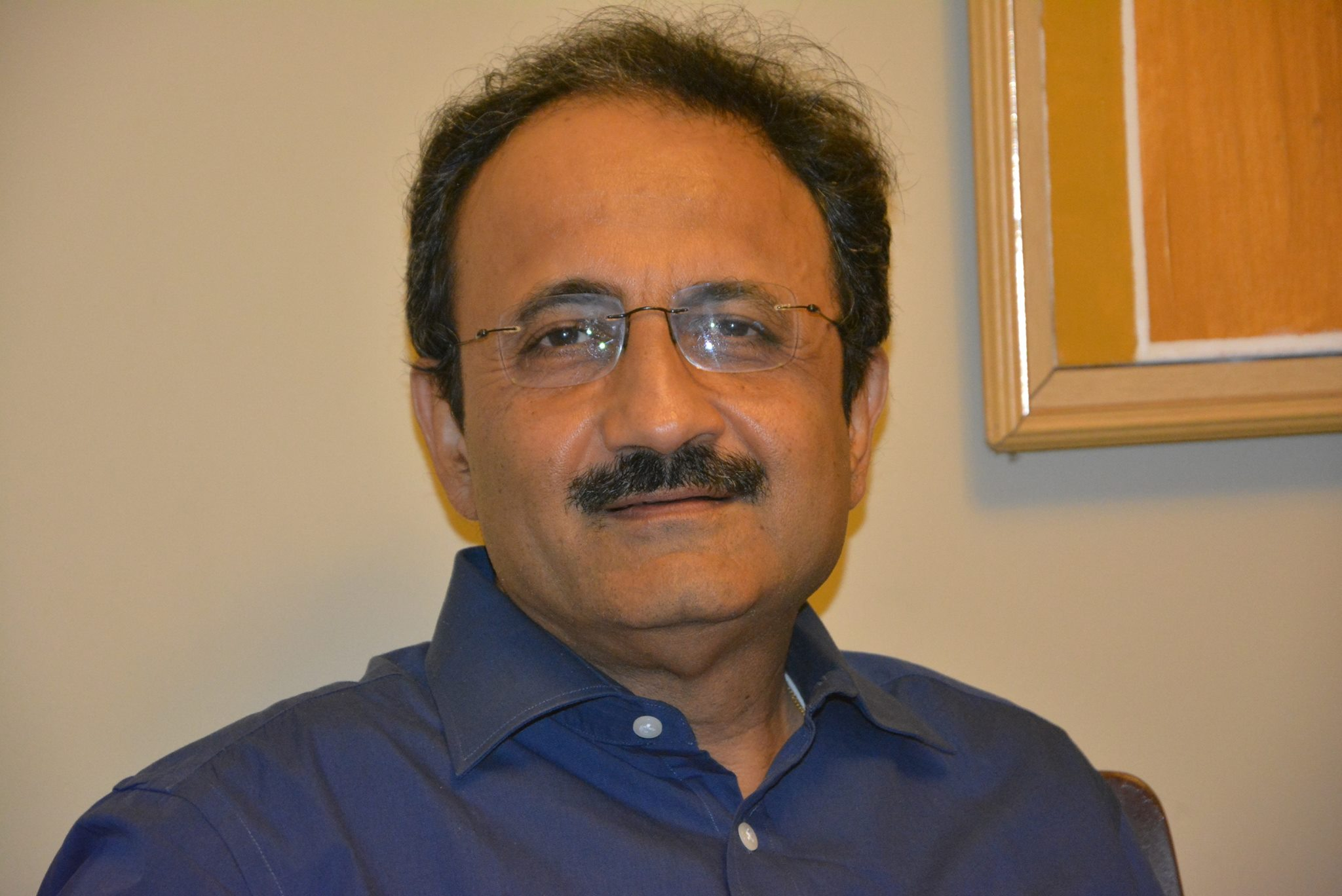
- Born: Udayan Karsandas Thakker; 28 October 1955 (age 70); Mumbai, India
- Education: Bachelor of Commerce
- Alma mater: Sydenham College
- Occupations: Poet, writer, translator
- Spouse: Rajul (m. 1984)
- Children: Richa, Garima
- Writing career
- Language: Gujarati
- Years active: 1974 - present
- Period: Postmodern Gujarati literature
- Notable awards: Jayant Pathak Poetry Prize (1987-1988); Ushnas Prize (2002-2003); Kalapi Award (2019); Narsinh Mehta Award (2023)

Udayan Thakkar is an Indian Gujarati-language poet, writer and translator from Mumbai, India.

His first anthology of poems is Ekavan (1987) which won him Jayant Pathak Poetry Prize. Sellara (2003), his second anthology, was awarded the Ushnas Prize (2002–03). His other significant works include Jugalbandhi (1995) and Udayan Thakker Na Chuntela Kavyo (2012; Selected poems of Udayan Thakker). He contributed to Gujarati children's literature. He is an editor of online poetry portal Poetry India.

== Early life ==
Thakker was born on 28 October 1955 in Mumbai, India to Karsandas and Shantiben. His grandfather was a native of Kutch. He started writing poems during his primary education.

He completed his SSC from The New Era School, Mumbai. He completed his Bachelor of Commerce from Sydenham College.

== Career ==
He is a Chartered accountant and Cost accountant by qualification.
In 1974 his poem came out for the first time in Kavita, a bimonthly Gujarati poetry journal. Subsequently, his poems appeared in Gujarati literary magazines including Shabdasrishti, Kavilok, Etad, Samipe, Gazalvishwa and Navneet Samarpan.

== Works ==
Ekavan, his first anthology of poems, was published in 1987, followed by Sellara (2003) and Udayan Thakker Na Chuntela Kavyo (2012). His poems have been translated into Japanese and English language and been published as a book.

His works in children's literature include En Milake Ten Milake Chhoo, Tak Dhina Dhin and Haak Chhi Hippo.

== Recognition ==
His poetry collection Ekavan (1987) was awarded by Jayant Pathak Poetry Award of 1987-88 and also prescribed as a textbook by SNDT Women's University. He won Ushnas Prize (2002–03) for his book Sellara (2003). He is a recipient of Harindra Dave Memorial Award and Best Book Prize of 2003 instituted by Gujarat Sahitya Akademi. In 2019, he received the Kalapi Award given by Indian National Theatre. He received the 2023 Narsinh Mehta Award.

== Personal life ==
He married Rajul in 1984 and they have two daughters, Richa and Garima.

== See also ==
- List of Gujarati-language writers
