= Pravin Pandya =

Indian Gujarati-language poet and playwright (Born: 1957)

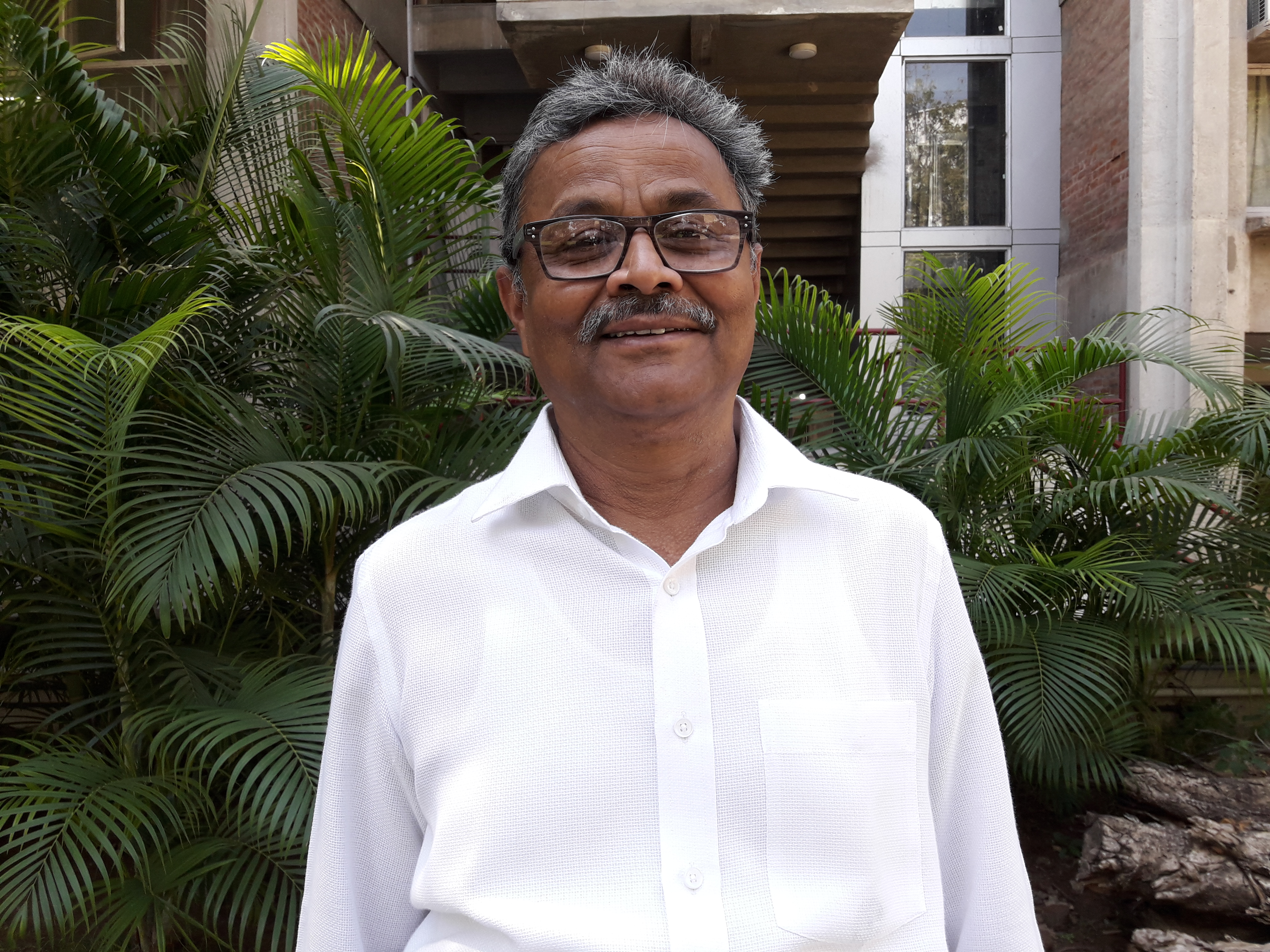
- at Gujarati Sahitya Parishad on 17 December 2016
- Born: Pravin Jagjivandas Pandya; February 16, 1957 (age 69); Dhrangadhra, Surendranagar, Gujarat
- Education: Bachelor of Arts
- Alma mater: Gujarat University
- Occupations: poet, writer, playwright, dramatist
- Writing career
- Language: Gujarati
- Years active: 1975–present
- Period: postmodern Gujarati literature
- Genres: Drama, Free verse
- Notable works: Ajavasnan Matsya (1994); India Lodge (2003); Barda Na Dungar (2009)
- Notable awards: Ushnas Prize (1994-95); Uma-Snehrashmi Prize (2008-09)

Signature
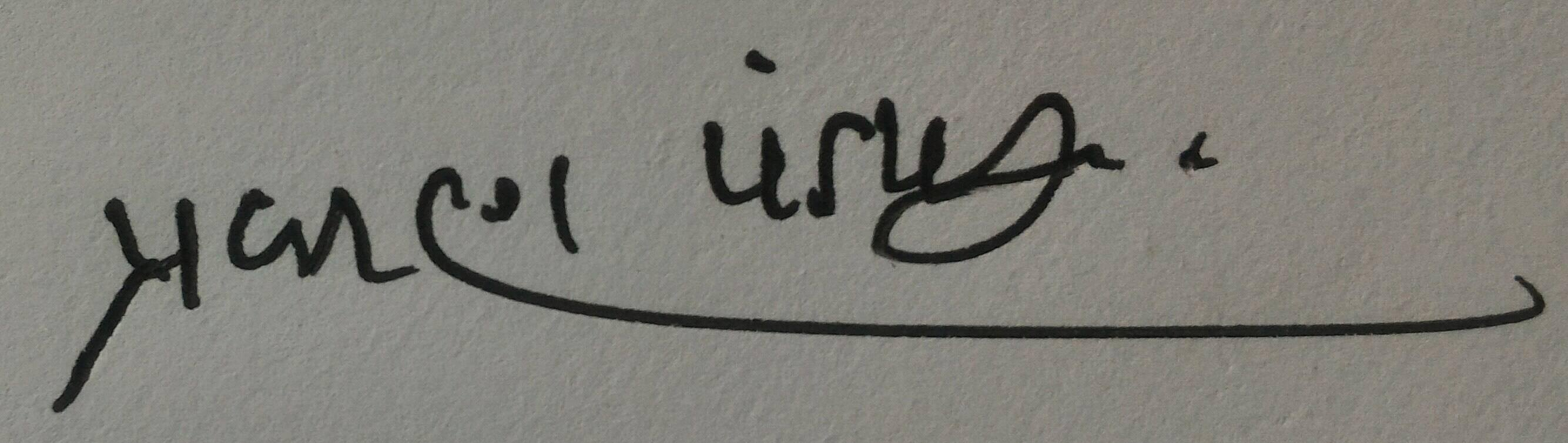

Pravin Pandya (born 16 February 1957) is a Gujarati language poet, writer, playwright and dramatist from Gujarat, India. His significant works include Ajavasnan Matsya (1994), India Lodge (2003), Hathiraja Ane Bija Natako (2004) and Barda Na Dungar (2009). He is noted in Gujarati literature for his theatre activism and his dramatized adaptations of Hindi poet Shamser Bahadur Singh's works. He won Uma-Snehrashmi Prize (2008–09) for his book Barda Na Dungar.

== Early life ==
Pandya was born in Dhrangadhra, Surendranagar district, Gujarat to Jagjivandas and Mangalabahen. He completed his schooling from K. M. Boys High School, Dhrangadhra. He got his Bachelor of Arts (Dramatics) from Gujarat University in 1989. He completed Diploma in Journalism in 1991. He lives in Ahmedabad.

== Career ==
He is a member of Advisory Board for Gujarati at Sahitya Akademi, New Delhi since 2014.

== Works ==
Ajavasnan Matsya, his first anthology of poems, was published in 1994, followed by Barda Na Dungar (2009) and Aa Kaurav Pandavna Samayma (2014). His poems reflect social images and political thoughts. Hathiraja Ane Bija Natako (2004) and India Lodge (2004) are his collections of plays. He adapted Sudamacharitra of Premanand Bhatt in Gujarati play as Pachhi Sudamoji Boliya which was published in Kumar (April 2016), a Gujarati magazine. He also adapted Hindi poet Shamser Bahadur Singh's works in Gujarati plays.

== Recognition ==
His poem Vyatha Chakra Kavita, published in Kavilok (1992), won the 1992 Balvantray Thakor Prize. He won the Ushnas Prize (1994–95) for his poetry collection Ajavasnan Matsya (1994) and the Uma-Snehrashmi Prize (2008-09) for his poetry collection Barda Na Dungar (2009). His play Begum Hajarat has been translated into 22 languages of India and telecast by Prasar Bharati in 2013. In 2008, he won Best Book Prize (2004) of Gujarat Sahitya Academy for his collection of plays India Lodge. In November 2015, he declared that he would return the award and money.

== See also ==
- List of Gujarati-language writers
