= Nand Kunverbaiji =

Nand Kunverba
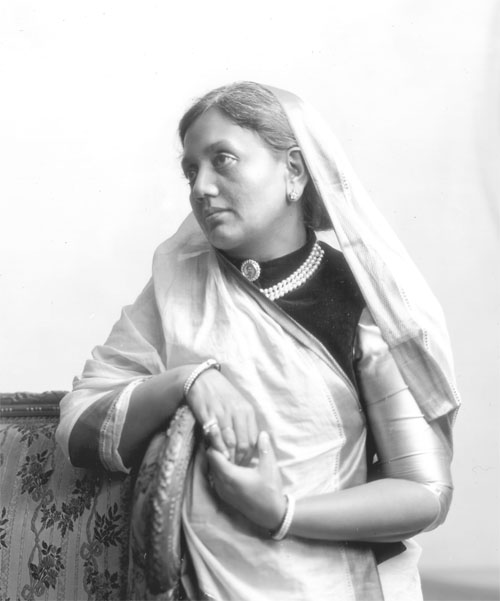

Maharani of Gondal
- Reign: 4 June 1882 – 1936
- Born: 1867; Dharampur
- Died: 9 March 1936 (aged 68–69); Mumbai
- Spouse: Bhagvatsinhji
- Issue: Bhojirajji; Bhupatsinhji; Kiritsinhji; Leilaba Kunverba; Ba Kunverba
- House: Dharampur (by birth); Gondal (by marriage)
- Father: Narandevji
- Religion: Hinduism

Nand Kunverba (1867 – 9 March 1936) was the Maharani of Gondal from 1881 until her death in 1936 through her marriage to Bhagvatsinhji.

== Biography ==
She was born in 1867 to Nanrandevji. She was one of the Bhagvatsinhji's four wives. She was the first high-ranking Rajput lady to break with the purdah system.

She became the first wife of an Indian ruling chief and the first Rajput lady to set aside caste prejudices and cross the Kala Pani when she joined her husband on a world tour in 1889–90. The purpose of this trip was her serious illness, which led the doctors to advise her to go to England for a change, so her husband, Bhagvatsinhji, took her there for her health. She stayed there for two years. She stayed in Edinburgh.

In recognition of her efforts to uplift the women of India, Queen Victoria personally invested her with the Imperial Order of the Crown of India in 1892, making her the first recipient in Kathiawar and one of the few women in India to receive this honor at that time. She and her husband attended the opening of the Imperial Institute by Queen Victoria in 1893.

They returned to India in 1893, visiting the United States, Japan, China, Australia, and Sri Lanka on their way. She recorded her travels in a book called Go-Mandal Parikramana or A Tour Round the World. In 1903, she performed the Laksha Chandi yagna, for which Brahmins came from near and far to Gondal, and she received, lodged, and fed them at her expense while they engaged in performing the havan and received dakṣiṇā according to their respective duties. She was elected president of the reception committee for the third Gujarati Sahitya Parishad held in Rajkot on 28 October 1909.

She founded the Bhagvatsinhji Orphanage, named after her husband, and funded it herself to care for all the orphans in Gondal until they turned eight, after which they were moved to the Bai Saheb Ba Asylum, maintained by the Durbar.

== Family ==
=== Marriage ===
She married Bhagvatsinhji on 4 June 1882 when he also took three other wives.

=== Children ===
On 8 January 1883, she gave birth to Bhojirajji, who was declared the heir to the throne of Gondal. Besides him, she had other children, including Bhupatsinhji, Kiritsinhji, Leilaba Kunverba and Ba Kunverba. All her children were educated in England or Scotland.

== Death ==
She died in Mumbai on 9 March 1936. After her death, a memorial was planned to be established in Mumbai. It was to include a shrine at the Banganga Tank and a fund for the cremation of the poor. The suggestion to create the memorial was made to Bhagvatsinhji by M. M. Pakvasa.

== Honours ==
Country	Year	Honour	Ribbon	Post-nominal letters
United Kingdom	1892	Imperial Order of the Crown of India		CI
United Kingdom	1911	King George V Coronation Medal		
United Kingdom	1935	King George V Silver Jubilee Medal		
