= Riverside Palace =

Coordinates: 21.97151°N 70.80143°E

The Riverside Palace is located in Gondal, India.

The Riverside Palace, which is 1.26 kilometres (0.78 mi) away from the Naulakha Palace, was built in 1875 by Bhagwat Sinhji for his son, Yuvraj Bhaijraji, the then crown prince. This palace has artifacts collected by the royal family, pictures, and trophies of heads of stuffed animals fixed on walls. The Riverside and the Orchard Palace are currently run as hotels. The living room here has the elegance of colonial architecture and has rich antique furniture. An exclusive Indian wing of this palace has beautiful brass ware and miniature paintings.

== Bibliography ==
- Miller, Sam (27 October 2012). Gujarat: Chapter from Blue Guide India. Blue Guides. ISBN 978-1-909079-68-7.
- Pandya, Kaushik (2007). A journey to the glorious Gujarat. Akshara Prakashan. ISBN 9788170570851.
