= Narandevji =

Maharana of Dharampur from 1860 to 1891

- Maharana of Dharampur

Maharana of Dharampur
- Reign: 20 January 1860 – 7 August 1891
- Predecessor: Ramdevji
- Successor: Mohandevji
- Born: 3 September 1840
- Died: 7 August 1891 (aged 50)
- Issue: Dharamdevji; Mohandevji; Baldevji; Prabhatdevji; Nand Kunverba
Names
- Narandevji II Ramdevji
- House: Dharampur
- Dynasty: Sisodia
- Father: Ramdevji

Narandevji II Ramdevji was the Maharana of Dharampur from 1860 until his death in 1891.

== Birth ==
He was born on 3 September 1840 to Ramdevji and his wife, the daughter of Gumansinhji, Maharawal of Chhota Udaipur.

== Reign ==
He ascended the throne at the young age of 19 on 26 January 1860. He was regarded as a very intelligent and capable ruler, and his rule was considered beneficent. He made significant improvements in the administration of the state by introducing new and appropriate laws to improve people's lives. British Government in 1862 granted him a sanad, giving him and his successors the right to adopt under Hindu law if there was no natural heir. He found the arrangement of auctioning the British share of transit duties in his state annually to the highest bidder distasteful. In 1869, he expressed a desire to take over its permanent management. He also offered to remit his dues on all through traffic with Khandesh, provided the British Government did the same. Besides that, he proposed to make his own arrangements for collecting import and export duties to encourage freedom of trade. The management was granted to him in 1870. In 1875, when Edward VII visited India, he was one of the Indian rulers invited to Mumbai to meet him. There, he received a medal and a khalat. He attended the Delhi durbar of 1877, where he was presented with a banner bearing the state coat of arms and was granted a personal salute of nine guns, along with the style of His Highness. This salute of nine guns was made permanent in 1878. In 1890, his personal salute was increased to 11 guns.

== Personal life ==
He married and had four sons: Dharamdevji, Mohandevji, Baldevji, and Prabhatdevji. He also had several daughters, including Nand Kunverba, who married Bhagvatsinhji.

== Death ==
He died on 7 August 1891 and was succeeded by his son Mohandevji as the Maharana of Dharampur.
