= Lady Wilson Museum =

Museum in Dharampur, Gujarat

- Established: January 31, 1928; 97 years ago
- Location: Dharampur, Valsad, Gujarat, India
- Coordinates: 20°32′14″N 73°10′06″E
- Collections: Industrial and art
- Founder: Vijayadevji

The Lady Wilson Museum is a museum located in Dharampur, Valsad in Gujarat, India. It is a managed and funded by the Department of Museums, Government of Gujarat.

== History ==
During his tenure as Revenue Commissioner, Vijayadevji formed a small collection of products from the Dharampur State. During his tours in India and abroad, he developed the idea of establishing a museum in Dharampur and collected numerous rare and valuable objects for it. The museum was named after the wife of Leslie Wilson, who formally opened it on 31 January 1928. Its purpose was to educate and engage both the people of Dharampur and visitors, showcasing the finest forms of art and industry to inspire a spirit of emulation and a desire for self-improvement. Vijayadevji contributed most of the exhibits for the museum, while his wife Manhar Kunverba and daughter Jasvant Kunverba also made significant contributions.

== Collection ==
The collections, displayed in a hall with an upper gallery and covering an area of 5,220 square feet, include lacquer and inlay works, wood, stone, and ivory carvings, metalwork, china, pottery, textiles, gold and silversmiths work, forest and agricultural projects, basketry, coins, musical instruments, zoological specimens, paintings and pictures, postage stamps and cards, and carpets. Celebrating 125 Years of Shrimad Rajchandraji gracing Dharampur, a section exhibiting life of Shrimad Rajchandra and inspiring events from His time in Dharampur, was opened at the Lady Wilson Museum, Dharampur on 23 March, 2025.
