= Bhagavadgomandal =

Gujarati language encyclopedia and dictionary

Bhagavadgomandal (Gujarati: ભગવદ્ગોમંડલ) is officially the first encyclopedia and dictionary entirely in Gujarati. Conceived by King Bhagvatsingh of Gondal (ગોંડલના ઠાકોરસાહેબ) in 1928, this dictionary spreads over 9500 pages in 9 volumes and includes the meaning and description of over a 281,377 words.

== History ==
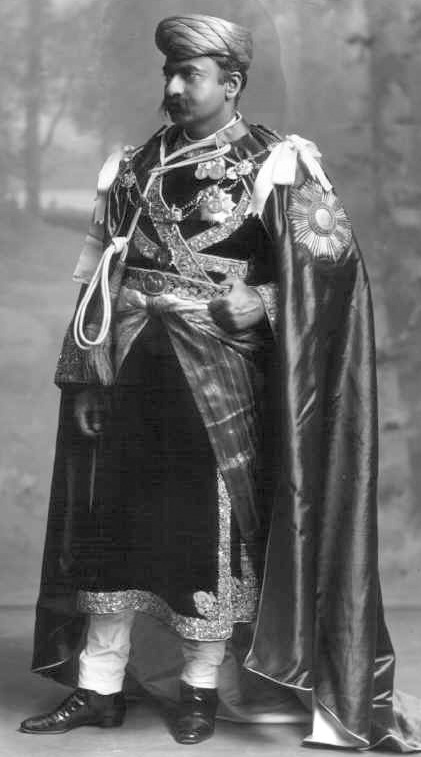
Maharaja Thakore Shri Sir Bhagwant Singhji Sagramji, Maharaja of Gondal, GCSI, GCIE, 1911.

The motivation behind the creation of the Bhagavadgomandal, was mainly to create and preserve the treasure of Gujarati language for future generations, in a way similar to that of Encyclopædia Britannica for knowledge in the English language.

This dictionary cum encyclopedia was created by Chandubhai Bahecharbhai Patel with the inspiration and active support from King Bhagavadsinghji. Both were concerned that the language had no major dictionary to speak of despite centuries of rich cultural and literary heritage. It took more than 27 years of effort to collect all the words of Gujarati language and their definitions.

The King and his team took an effort to collect the words not only from Gujarati, but also from the dialects spoken in various parts of Gujarat, such as Kutch, Kathiawar, North and South Gujarat.

The whole project was supported by many literati, poets, historians, teachers and authors of that time. Three generation of Bhagavadsinhji continued their support for this mammoth task.

== Features ==
The notable and unique aspect of Bhagavadgomandal is that it not only lists the spellings, grammar, usage and meanings of words, but it also provides historical facts and figures, diagrams, cross-references to other words and history of origin, wherever applicable. This feature expands Bhagvadgomandal's scope from a dictionary to that of an encyclopedia.

The other interesting feature is that Bhagavadgomandal describes the life and contributions of famous people, up to the time of the creation of the encyclopedia.

== Publications ==
The first edition of the dictionary was printed in 1940. It went out of print in 1958.

A second reprint was printed in 1987 by Pravin Prakashan, Rajkot. It was feared that people may not be interested in the encyclopedia anymore, but the response was really good, and that lead to the third reprint, that was printed in 2008.

== Online Edition ==
In August 2008 the first online edition of Bhagavadgomandal was launched by Pravin Prakashan.

== See also ==
- Gujarati Language
