= Wilson Hills, Gujarat =

Hill station in the Indian state of Gujarat

Wilson Hills
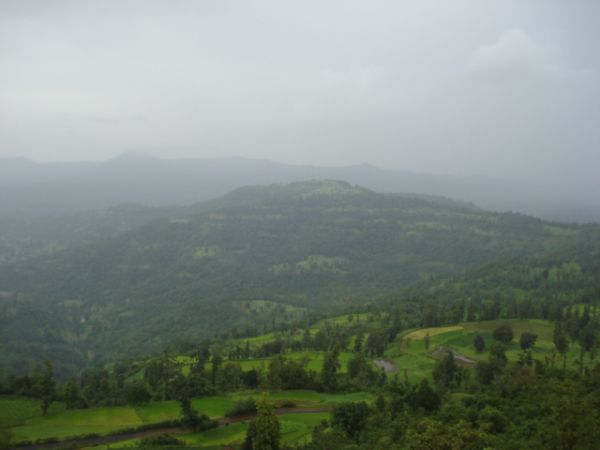
- A view from Wilson Hills

Highest point
- Elevation: 675 m (2,215 ft)
- Coordinates: 20°30′29″N 73°21′23″E

Naming
- Language of name: Gujarati

Geography
- Location within India
- Location: Near Dharampur; Gujarat, India
- Parent range: Western Ghats

Geology
- Mountain type: Volcanic

Climbing
- Easiest route: Road

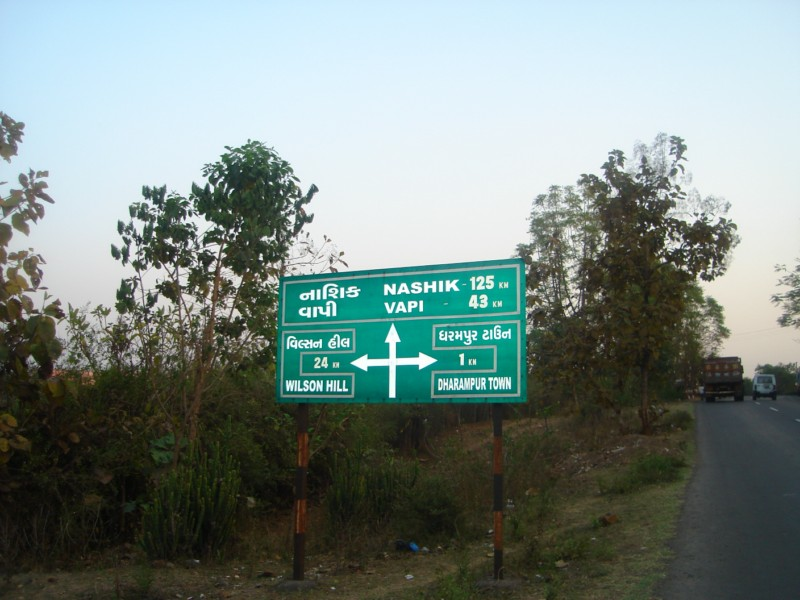
Wilson Hills Sign Board

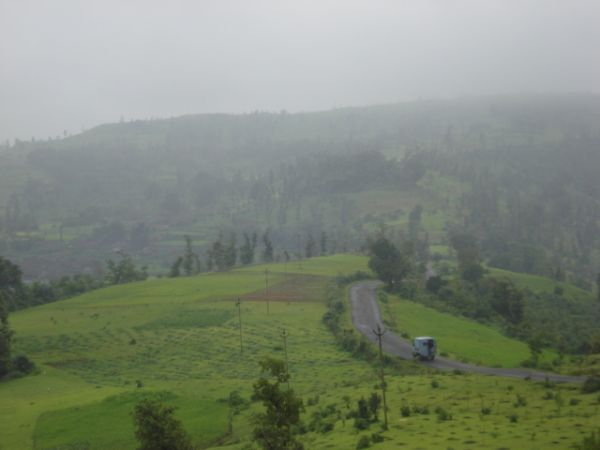
Wilson Hills Valley

Wilson Hills is a hill station in the Indian state of Gujarat. It is situated near Dharampur of Valsad district.

Wilson Hills stands in a densely forested region close to the Pangarbari Wildlife Sanctuary.

It has an average elevation of 750m (2500 feet). The Wilson Hills are popular during the summer months as it enjoys a cooler and less humid climate than the surrounding area.

== View points ==
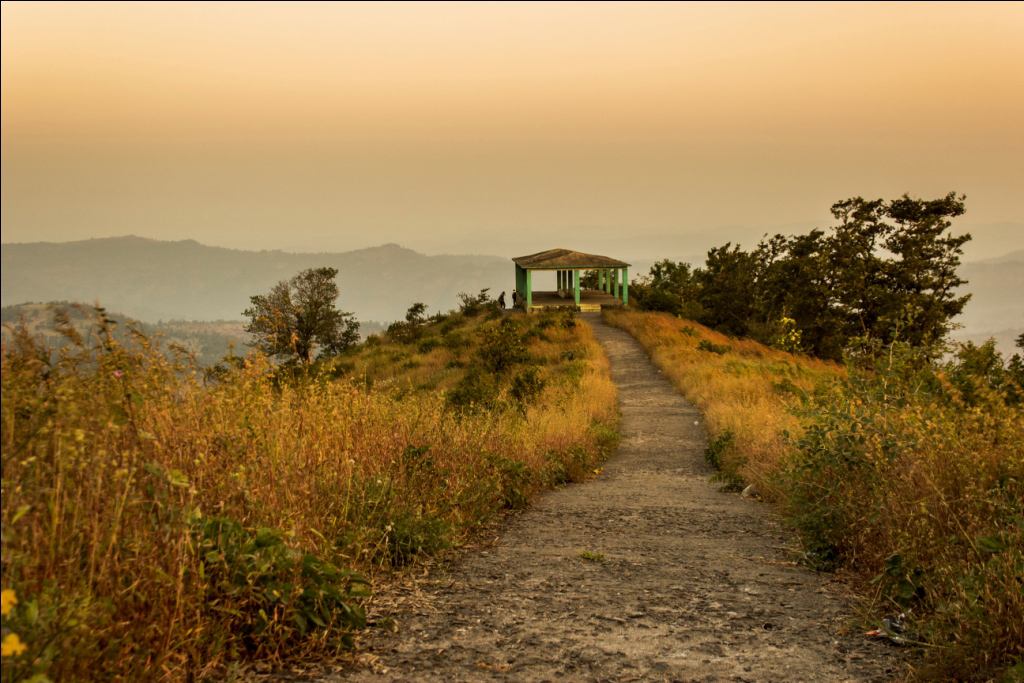
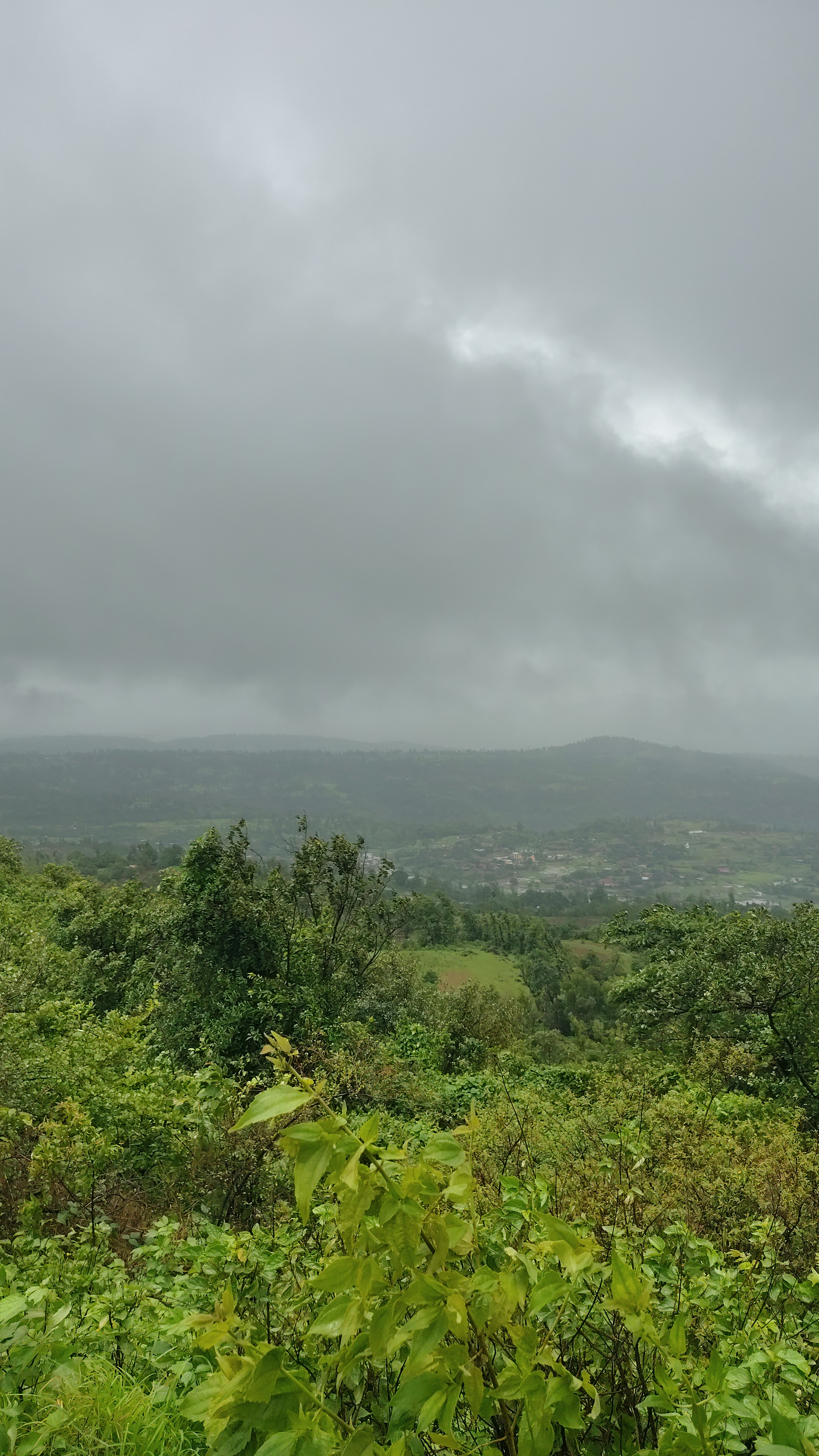
Wilson Hills viewpoints

There are a total of six points on the Wilson Hills and other places near Wilson Hills.

- Marble Chatri Point
- Steep Valley Point
- Ozone Valley Point
- Sunrise Point
- Sunset Point
- Shankar waterfalls point

== Nearby attractions ==
- Barumal temple
- Lady Wilson museum
- The district science centre
- Jalaram dham, Faladhara
- Bilpudi twin waterfalls
- Ganesh waterfalls Makadban
- Khoba waterfalls
- U turn point, Khadki

== History ==
Wilson Hills was named in memory of Leslie Wilson, the Governor of Bombay from 1923 to 1928, by Vijayadevji, the Maharana of Dharampur. Leslie Wilson and Vijayadevji had planned to develop the area into a hill station, but the project failed to take place. A monument to their memory remains on the peak.

Wilson Hills

Climate chart (precipitation, max. and min. temperature)
J	F	M	A	M	J	J	A	S	O	N	D
0 29 13	0 32 14	0 36 19	25 38 22	50 39 25	600 34 24	850 30 22	500 29 21	475 31 23	250 34 21	25 33 20	0 29 13
- █ Average max. and min. temperatures in °C
- █ Precipitation totals in mm
- Source: Wilson Hills climate and weather
Imperial conversion
J	F	M	A	M	J	J	A	S	O	N	D
0 84 55	0 90 57	0 97 66	1 100 72	2 102 77	24 93 75	33 86 72	20 84 70	19 88 73	9.8 93 70	1 91 68	0 84 55
- █ Average max. and min. temperatures in °F
- █ Precipitation totals in inches

== Location ==
Wilson Hills is located at 20.51442°N 73.218813°E, about 130 km from Surat, 80 km from Navsari, and 60 km from Valsad. It is connected by a tar road to the town of Dharampur, which is 29 km (18 miles) away at the base of the hills.

== Distance from towns and cities ==
- Dharampur, India - 25 km
- Chikhli, Gujarat - 55 km
- Saputara - 120 km
- Vapi - 62 km
- Valsad - 55 km
- Navsari - 81 km
- Surat - 126 km
- Mumbai - 250 km
- Barumal - 18 km
- Nashik - 145 km
- Nanapondha - 41 km
- Ahmedabad - 485 km
