= Naulakha Palace =

Palace in Gondal, India

Coordinates: 26°24′10″N 86°10′14″E

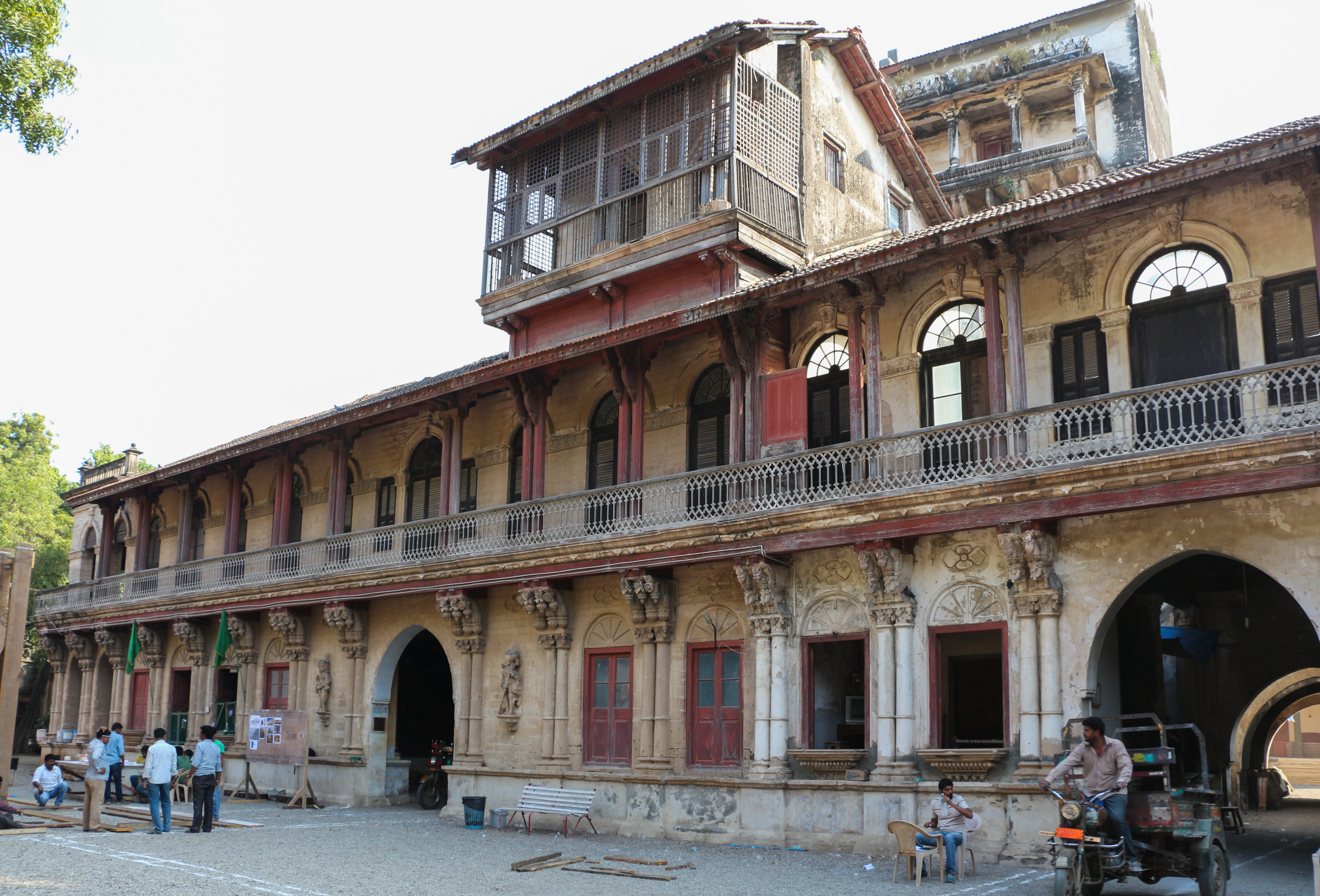
Façade of the palace

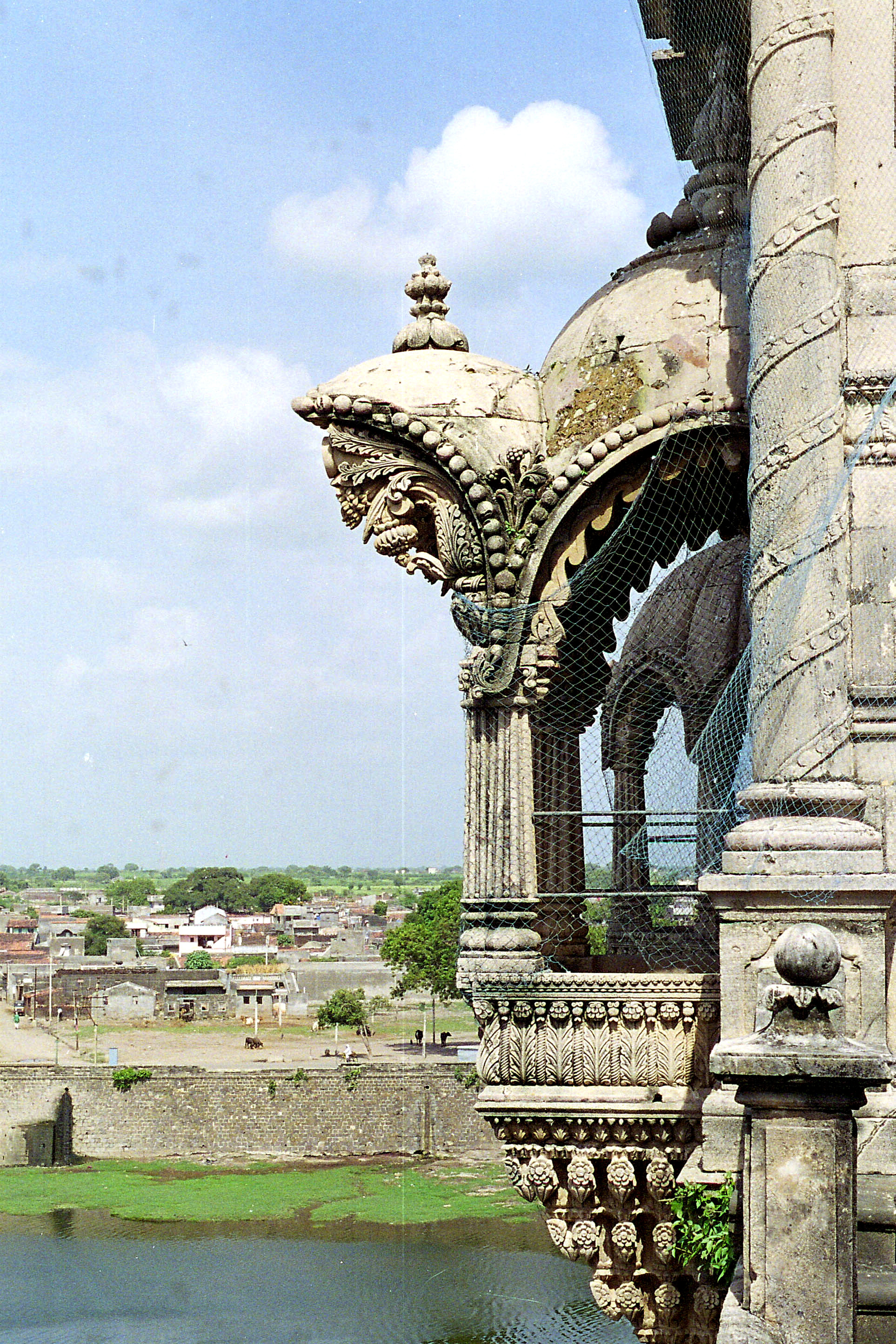
A Jharokha of the Naulakha Palace balcony that inspired many similar architecture in other royal buildings

The Naulakha Palace, the oldest extant palace in Gondal, India, dating back to the 18th century (1748) during the reign of Haloji Sagramji, with a "sculpted facade" is a part of the Darbargardh fort complex. It is named "Navalakaha" meaning that which cost rupees "nine lakhs", nine lakhs or Rs 900,000 being the cost of the construction at that time. It has stone carvings with "jharokhas" (balconies), a pillared courtyard, delicately carved arches, and a unique spiral staircase. The large chandelier-lit "durbar" hall (court house) has stuffed panthers, gilt wooden furniture, and antique mirrors. The "private palace museum" displays an array of silver caskets which were in the services of carrying messages and gifts for the Maharajah Bhagwat Sinhji on his silver jubilee as ruler of Gondal. The palace is situated in Gondal city, which is well connected by road, rail and air services. It is located 38 kilometres (24 mi) away from Rajkot, which is also the airport (40 kilometres (25 mi) away) and rail head.

== Features ==
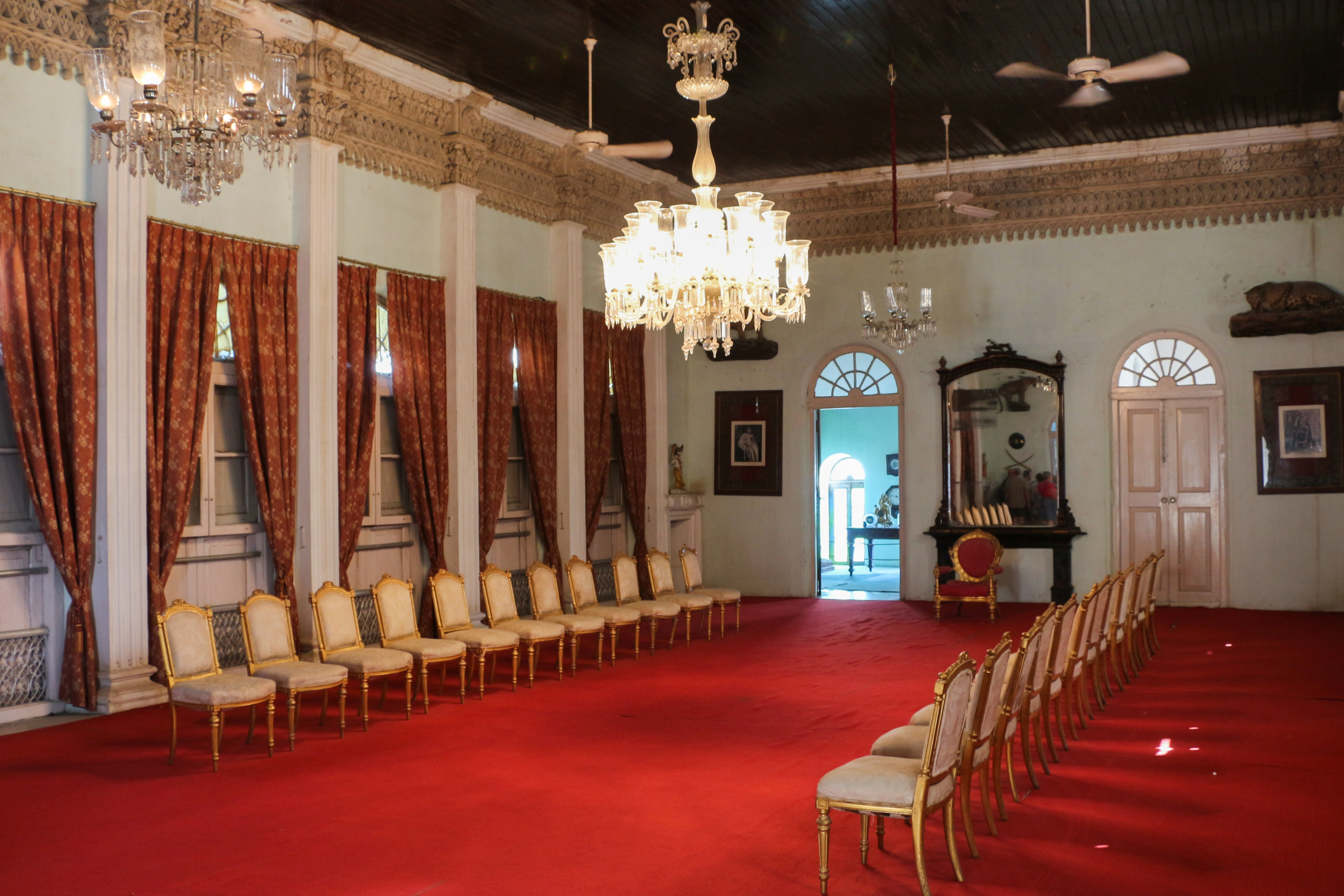
An interior view of the Naulakha Palace

Gondal was the capital city of a Jadeja Rajput clan. The Naulakha Palace is said to be the oldest palace in the Gondal area. It features arcades, jharokas, a royal audience hall (durbar hall) (which is still used by the present Maharaja), a winding stairway, chandeliers, decorated mirrors and antique furnishings. It is a triple storied edifice with an open arcade with stone carvings on the first floor flanked by towers. The eaves above the stone fittings on this floor are carved with sculptures of real and mythical animals. A part of the first floor also houses a museum which has architectural features over the rooms with carvings made out of wood and stone over its doors. The exhibits in the museum include artifacts collected by the Maharaja of a large number of toy cars, pictures, a library of books, trophies and so forth. The decorated balcony provides scenic views of the Gondal town. The side room on the left side of the palace has exhibits of kitchen ware and a pair of huge weighing balance; the weighing balance was used on special celebrations of the Maharaja's birthdays when he used to be weighed in gold equivalent which would then be donated to the poor.

== Grounds ==
Naulakha Palace is situated within Darbargardh (an old fort complex), which was built during the 18th century (1748), with a number of additional structures built in subsequent years. The main approach to the complex is through a curved gateway structure with a clock tower which rises in three tiers above the gateway. The palace is at the far end from the gate and is fronted by a rectangular forecourt. The palace has an overview of the Gondal River.

There are many other structures within the complex, such as the Huzoor Palace, a large building which is currently the residence of the royal family; the Orchard Palace, a wing of the Huzoor; and the Riverside Palace, which is 1.26 kilometres (0.78 mi) away from Naulakha. An adjoining zenana is in a state of ruin. It is flanked by two statues of guards and has stone tracery architectural features on its upper floor. The Gori Pir, a Muslim shrine (dargah) of a saint is within the courtyard. An old railway saloon, which is displayed in the gardens, has basic accommodation of a bedroom, dining room, and bathroom with period fitments.

== Gallery ==
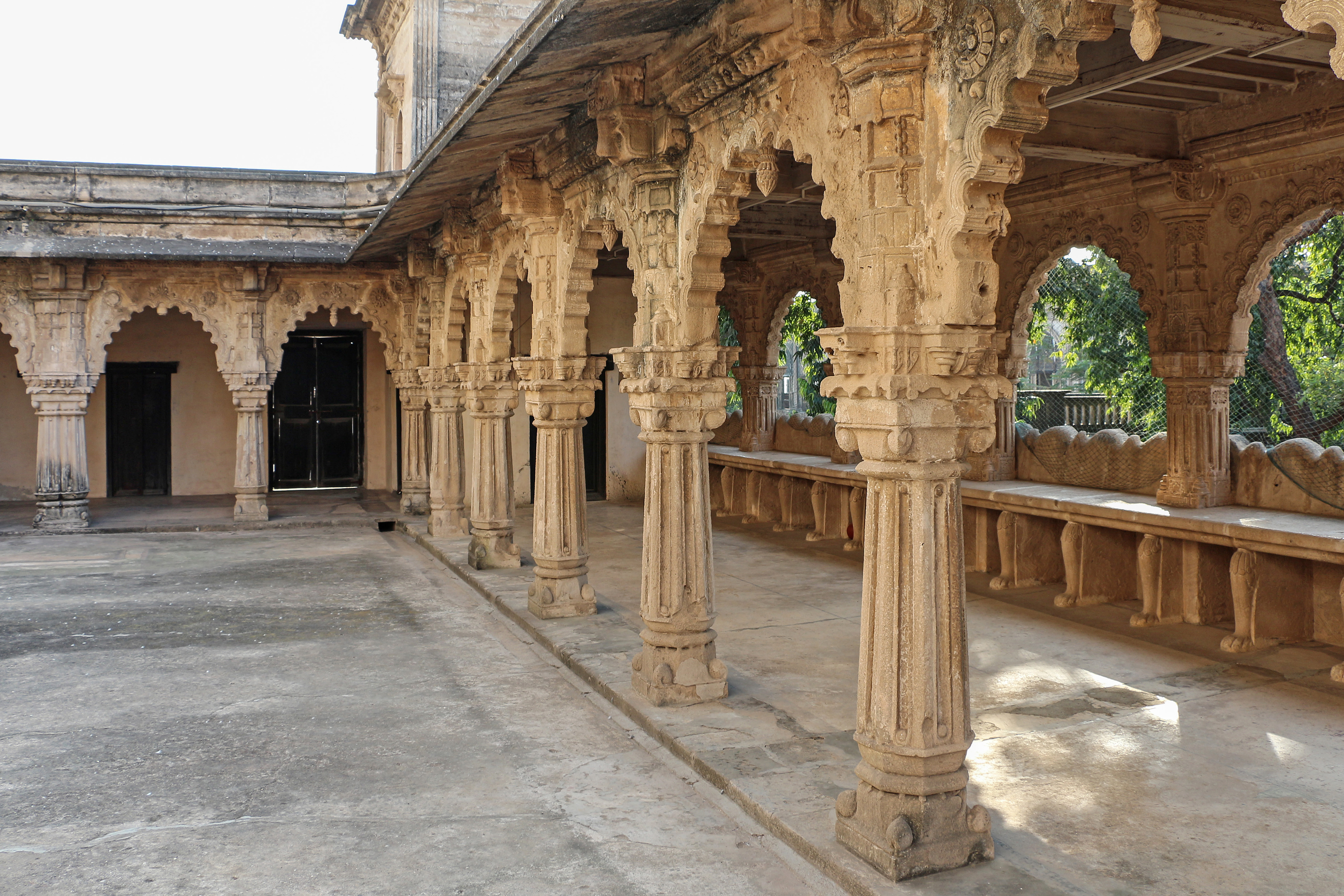

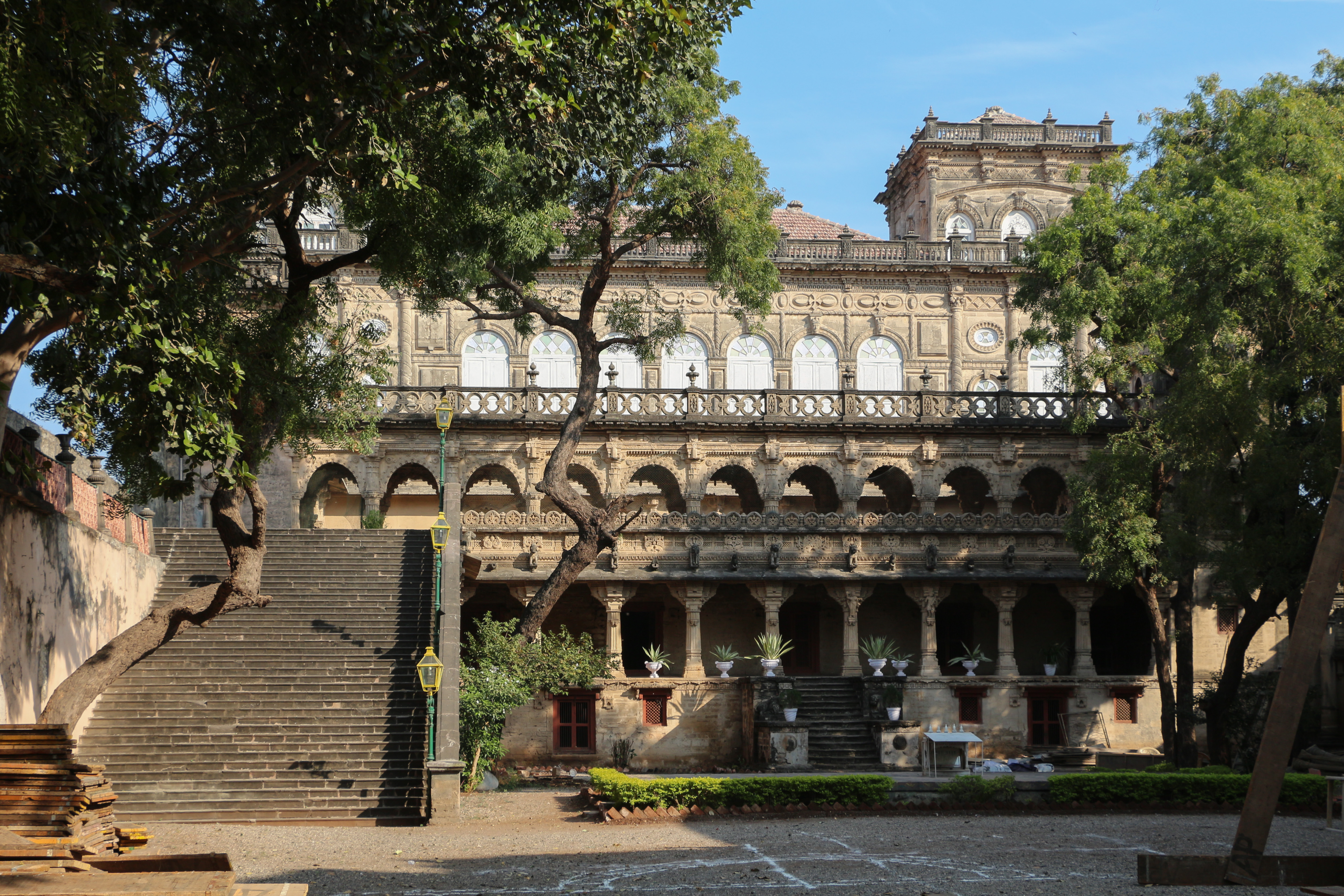
The palace from the front

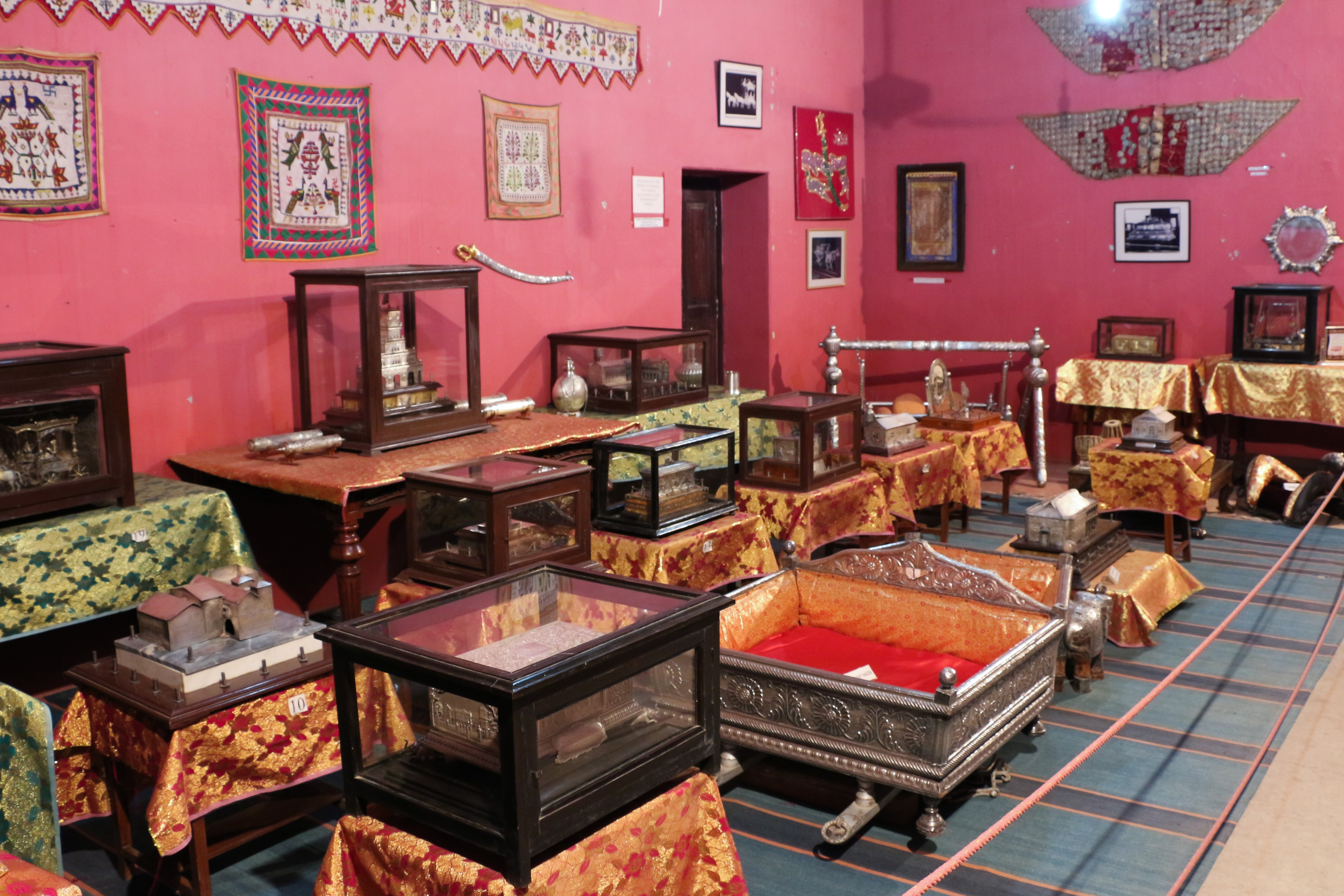
The Museum

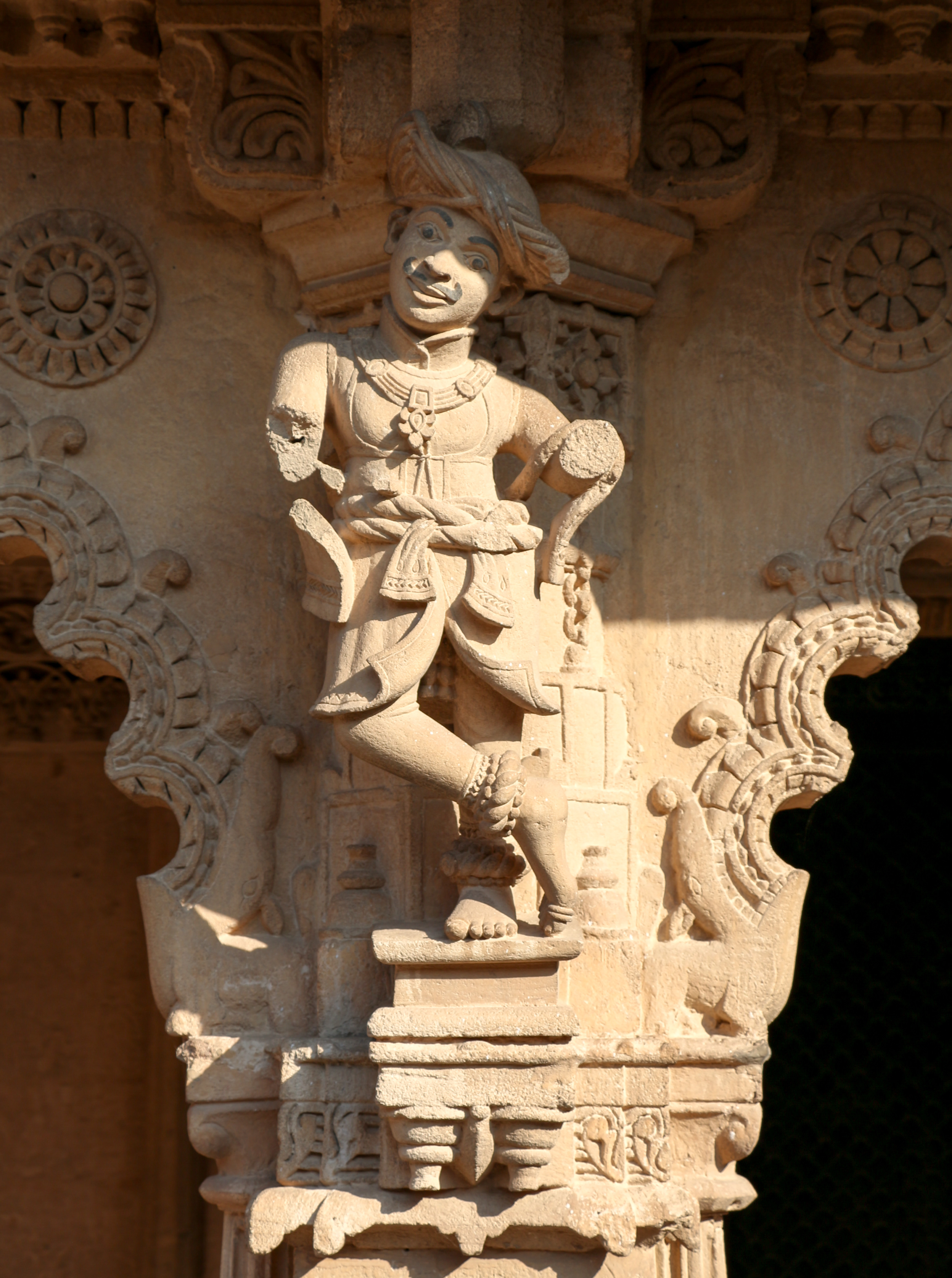

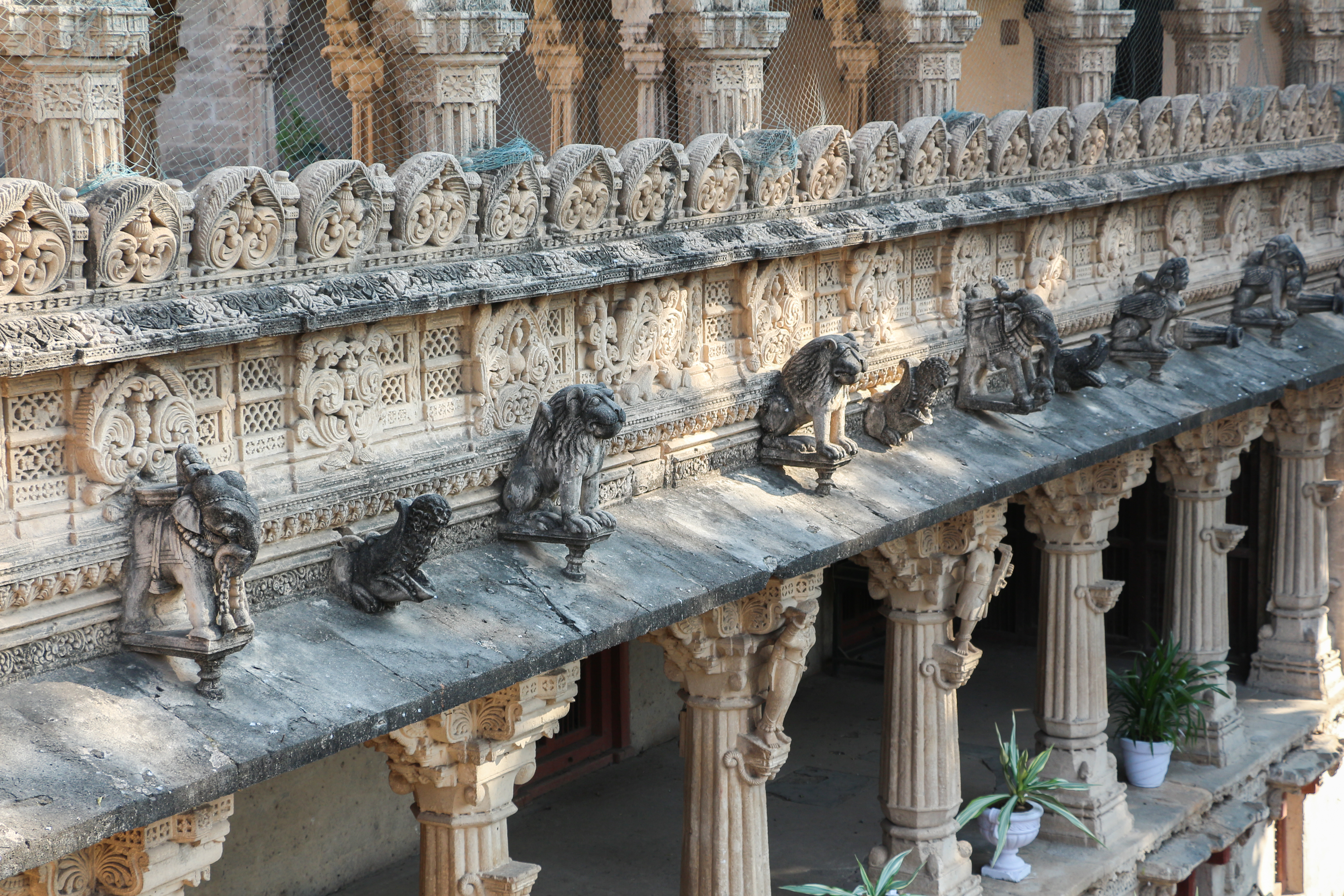
Detail of Naulakha Palace

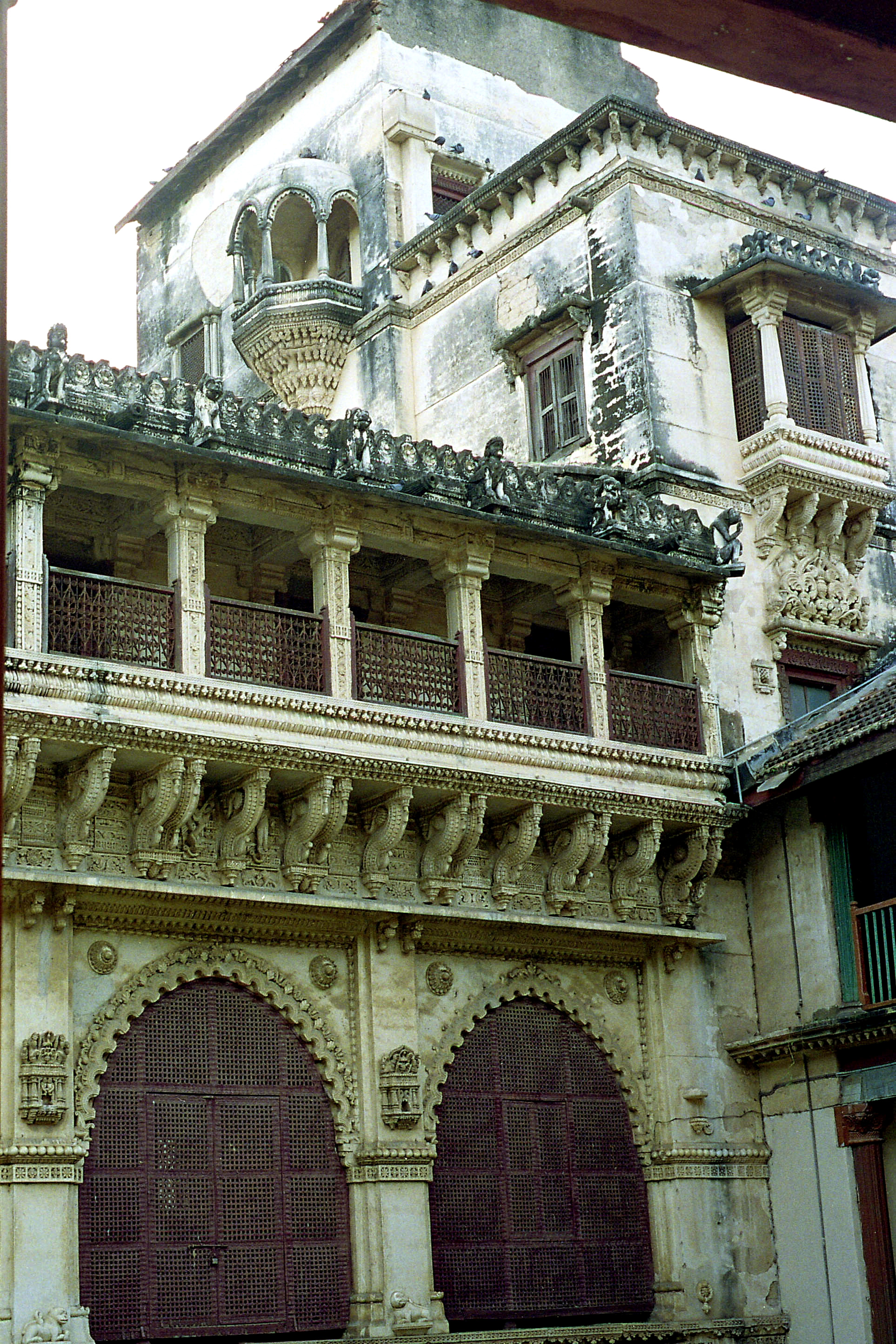
A zenana in the palace complex

== Bibliography ==
- Abram, David (1 October 2013). The Rough Guide to India. London: Rough Guides. ISBN 978-1-4093-4267-0.
- Bradnock, Robert W; Bradnock, Roma (2000). India Handbook. Trade & Travel Publications. ISBN 9780844248417.
- Miller, Sam (27 October 2012). Gujarat: Chapter from Blue Guide India. Blue Guides. ISBN 978-1-909079-68-7.
- Pandya, Kaushik (2007). A journey to the glorious Gujarat. Akshara Prakashan. ISBN 9788170570851.
