= Perlite =

Amorphous volcanic glass

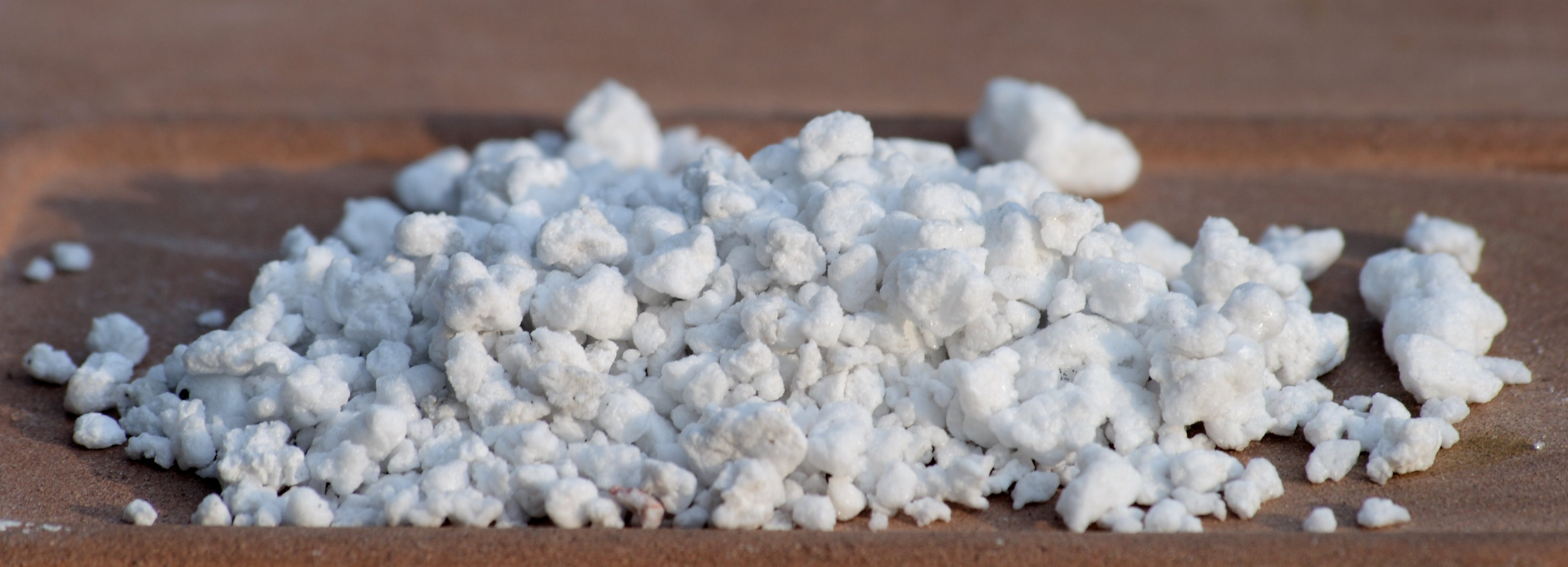
Expanded horticultural perlite

Perlite is an amorphous volcanic glass that has a relatively high water content, typically formed by the hydration of obsidian. It occurs naturally and has the unusual property of greatly expanding when heated sufficiently. It is an industrial mineral, suitable "as ceramic flux to lower the sintering temperature", and a commercial product useful for its low density after processing. It is also used as a soil conditioner in horticulture.

== Properties ==
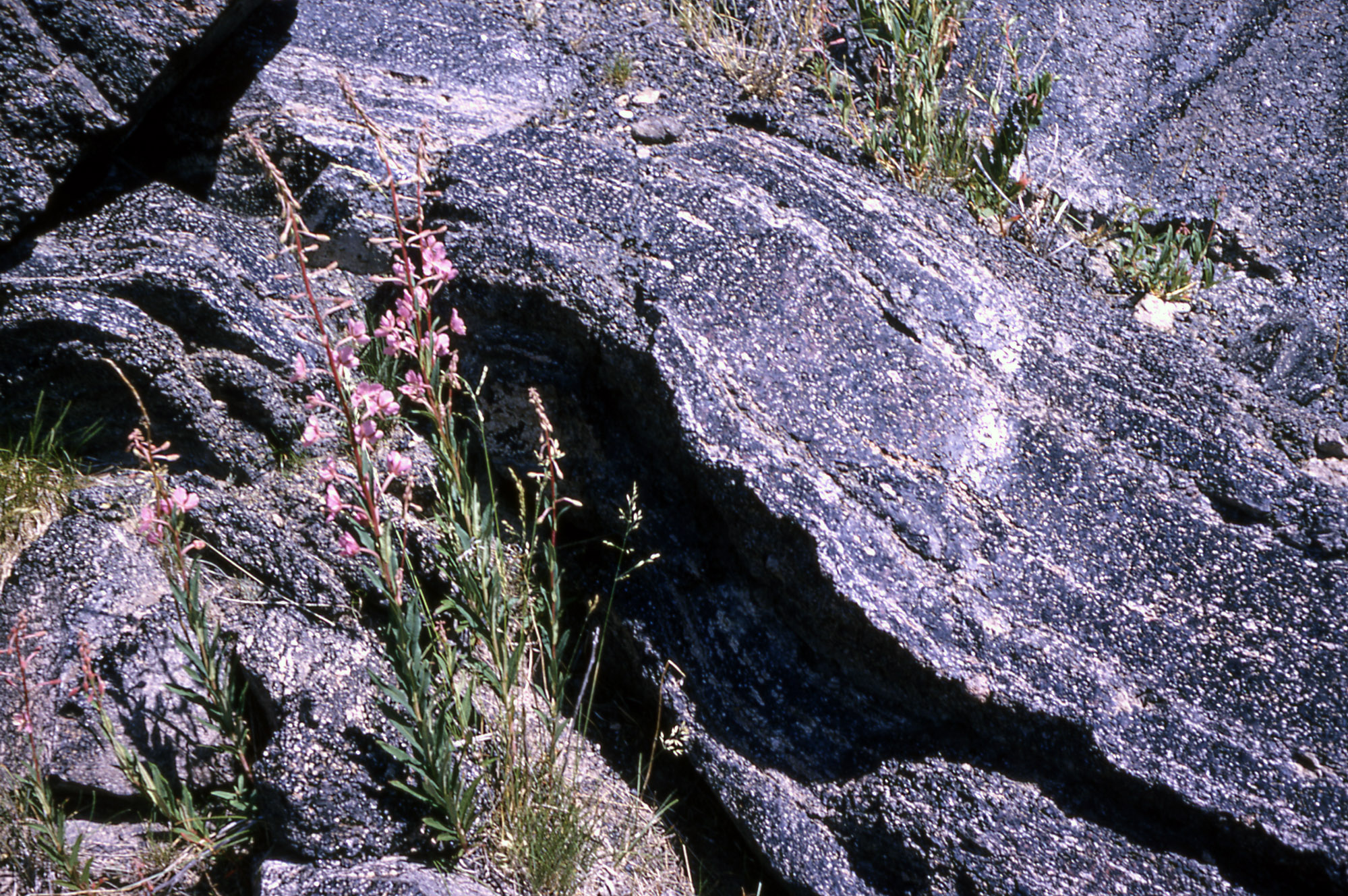
Perlite boulders with fireweed in foreground

Perlite softens when it reaches temperatures of 850–900 °C (1,560–1,650 °F). Water trapped in the structure of the material vaporises and escapes, and this causes the expansion of the material to 7–16 times its original volume. The expanded material is a brilliant white, due to the reflectivity of the trapped bubbles. Unexpanded ("raw") perlite has a bulk density around 1100 kg/m^{3} (1.1 g/cm^{3}), while typical expanded perlite has a bulk density of about 30–150 kg/m^{3} (0.03–0.150 g/cm^{3}).

== Typical analysis ==
- 70–75% silicon dioxide: SiO_{2}
- 12–15% aluminium oxide: Al_{2}O_{3}
- 3–4% sodium oxide: Na_{2}O
- 3–5% potassium oxide: K_{2}O
- 0.5-2% iron oxide: Fe_{2}O_{3}
- 0.2–0.7% magnesium oxide: MgO
- 0.5–1.5% calcium oxide: CaO
- 3–5% loss on ignition (chemical / combined water)

== Sources and production ==
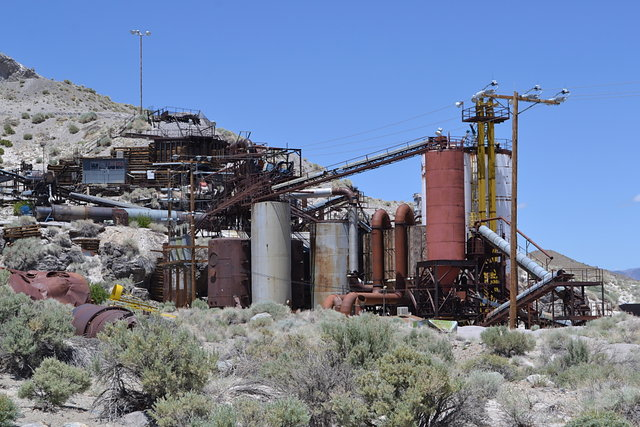
Perlite mine in Owens Valley, California.

Perlite is a non-renewable resource. The world reserves of perlite are estimated at 700 million tonnes.

The confirmed resources of perlite existing in Armenia amount to 150 million m^{3}, whereas the total amount of projected resources reaches up to 3 billion m^{3}. Considering specific density of 1.1 ton/m^{3} confirmed reserves in Armenia amount to 165 million tons.

Other reported reserves are: Greece - 120 million tonnes, Turkey, USA and Hungary - about 49-57 million tonnes.

Perlite world production, led by China, Turkey, Greece, USA, Armenia and Hungary, summed up to 4.6 million tonnes in 2018.

Osham hills of Patanvav, Gujarat, India are the only source of mineral Perlite in India.

The largest landslide in Icelandic history (the Loðmundarskriður in Loðmundarfjörður) was assisted by the mountain's high perlite composition. Plans to mine and export the perlite in the mid 20th century fell through.

== Uses ==
Because of its low density and relatively low price (about US$150 per tonne of unexpanded perlite), many commercial applications for perlite have been developed.

=== Construction and manufacturing ===
In the construction and manufacturing fields, it is used in lightweight plasters, concrete and mortar, insulation and ceiling tiles. It may also be used to build composite materials that are sandwich-structured or to create syntactic foam.

Perlite filters are fairly common in filtering beer before it is bottled.

Small quantities of perlite are also used in foundries, cryogenic insulation, and ceramics (as a clay additive). It is also used by the explosives industry.

=== Aquatic filtration ===
Perlite is an excellent filtration aid and is used extensively as an alternative to diatomaceous earth. The popularity of perlite usage as a filter medium is growing considerably worldwide. Several products exist in the market to provide perlite based filtration. Several perlite filters and perlite media have met NSF-50 approval (Aquify PMF Series and AquaPerl), which standardizes water quality and technology safety and performance. Perlite can be safely disposed of through existing sewage systems, although some pool operators choose to separate the perlite using settling tanks or screening systems to be disposed of separately.

=== Biotechnology ===
Due to thermal and mechanical stability, non-toxicity, and high resistance against microbial attacks and organic solvents, perlite is widely used in biotechnological applications. Perlite was found to be an excellent support for immobilization of biocatalysts such as enzymes for bioremediation and sensing applications.

=== Agriculture ===
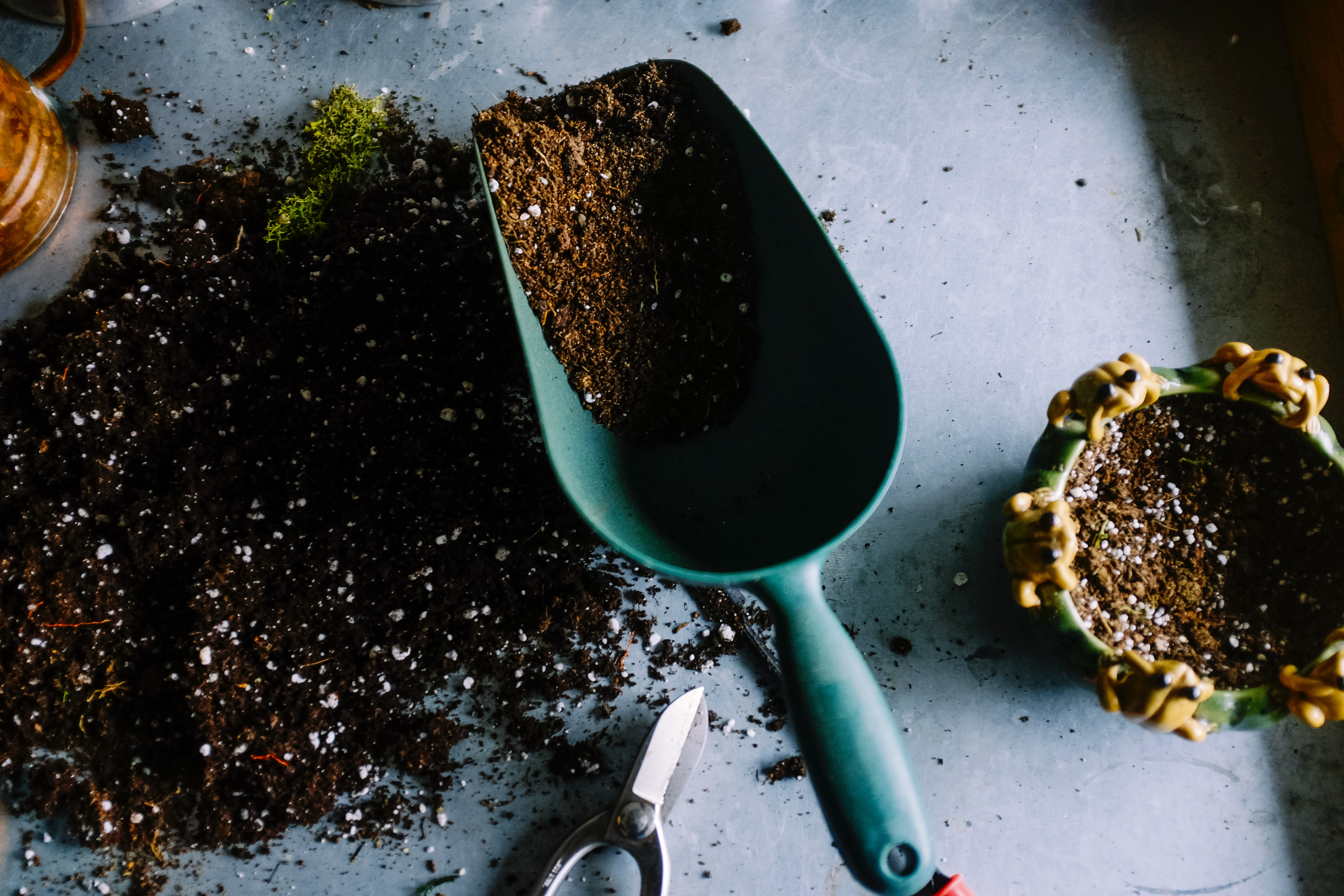
Perlite mixed into potting compost

In horticulture, perlite can be used as a soil amendment or alone as a medium for hydroponics or for starting cuttings. When used as an amendment, it has high permeability and low water retention and helps prevent soil compaction.

=== Cosmetics ===
Perlite is used in cosmetics as an absorbent and mechanical exfoliant.

Estimated perlite consumption in the U.S. by application
Fraction	Use
53%	building construction products
14%	horticultural aggregate
14%	fillers
8%	filter aid
11%	other

Cost of unexpanded perlite
End of year	Price in the U.S. $ per metric ton
2001	$36.30
2002	$36.50
2003	$38.20
2004	$41.80
2005	$40.50
2006	$42.90
2007	$45.30
2008	$48.00
2009	$49.00

=== Substitutes ===
Perlite can be replaced for all of its uses. Substitutes include:

- Diatomite, used for filter-aids
- Expanded clay, an alternative lightweight filler for building materials
- Shale
- Pumice
- Slag
- Vermiculite - many expanders of perlite are also exfoliating vermiculite and belong to both trade associations

== Occupational safety ==
As perlite contains silicon dioxide, goggles and silica filtering masks are recommended when handling large quantities.

=== United States ===
The Occupational Safety and Health Administration (OSHA) has set the legal limit (permissible exposure limit) for perlite exposure in the workplace as 15 mg/m^{3} total exposure and 5 mg/m^{3} respiratory exposure over an 8-hour workday. The National Institute for Occupational Safety and Health (NIOSH) has set a recommended exposure limit (REL) of 10 mg/m^{3} total exposure and 5 mg/m^{3} respiratory exposure over an 8-hour workday.

== See also ==
- Biochar
- Foam glass
- Industrial minerals
- Mortar (firestop)
- Vermiculite
