= Mohandevji =

Maharana of Dharampur from 1891 to 1921

- Maharana of Dharampur
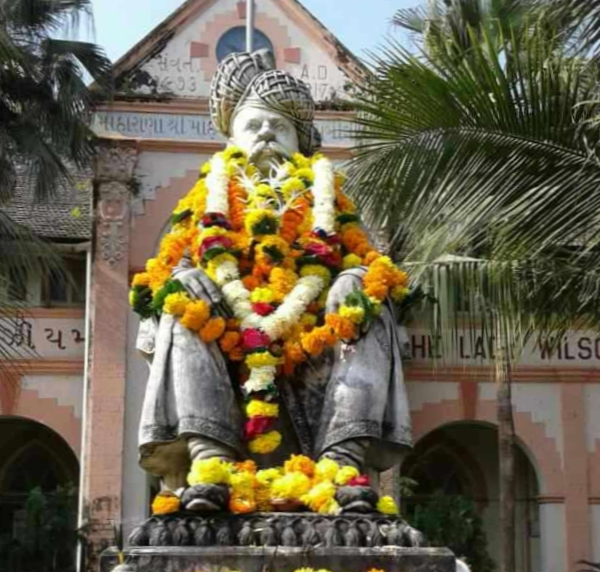
- Statue of Mohandevji at Lady Wilson Museum, Dharampur

Maharana of Dharampur
- Reign: 7 August 1891 – 26 March 1921
- Coronation: 7 August 1891
- Predecessor: Narandevji
- Successor: Vijayadevji
- Born: 9 June 1863
- Died: 26 March 1921 (aged 57)
- Issue: Vijayadevji; Narasinhdevji
Names
- Mohandevji Narayandevji
- House: Dharampur
- Dynasty: Sisodia
- Father: Narandevji
- Religion: Hinduism

Mohandevji Narandevji was the Maharana of Dharampur from 1891 until his death in 1921.

== Early life and education ==
He was born on 9 June 1863 to Narandevji. He was educated at Rajkumar College, Rajkot.

== Reign ==
He became the Maharana of Dharampur with full powers on 7 August 1891 following his father's death. One of the first things he did was to cut palace expenses, and by 1898, to reduce palace expenses, he closed down many of its departments, including the garage, cattle farm, tailoring and washing. He also sent the palace hakim away, and the palace stores were allowed to supply only tea and sugar. The next year in 1899, he fixed the amount of allowance for him and from that he also used to pay his staff and maintain his kitchen. He took great interest in educating his subjects and established many schools across various parts of Dharampur. He introduced free primary and high school education in his state and provided scholarships for deserving students to pursue college and advanced studies. He was well-known as a man of charitable disposition. He commissioned many temples and contributed substantial amounts to deserving philanthropic causes. He attended the Delhi durbar of 1911. After the State entry of the sultan of Lahej, the sultan of Shihr and Mukalla, and the Fadhli sultan in Delhi, he arrived in a carriage accompanied by a band, a police detachment, and his paraphernalia. There was also a small escort on horseback and a second carriage carrying his principal officials. He paid homage to George V while dressed in white silk with gold embroidery, ornate decorations, and a yellow turban. He received the Delhi Durbar Medal in gold.

== Death ==
He died on 26 March 1921 and was succeeded by his son Vijayadevji.
