= Ardoi =

Ardoi is a village in Kotda-Sangani Taluka of Rajkot district, Gujarat, India.

== History ==
Ardoi was granted in appanage from Gondal State to Sangoji, founder of the Kotda Sangani estate, in about 1654-65 AD. Before this it was the original seat of the chieftain of Gondal. But when he acquired Gondal he moved his capital to there from Ardoi. The village has a tower on its eastern side.

== Geography ==
It is situated about twelve miles north-east of Gondal and four miles north-west of Kotda and about twelve miles south of Rajkot. It is situated on a stream which flows into the Gondal river. The soil is good and the village lies only two miles to the east of the Rajkot-Gondal road.
