= Huzoor Palace, Gondal =

Royal palace in Gondal, India

The Huzoor Palace, currently the residence of the royal family, is located in Gondal, India. Its annex, or wing, is known as the Orchard Palace.

The Orchard Palace is 600 metres (2,000 ft) to the east of Naulakha Palace, was used as a guest house during the nineteenth century. As it is located next to an orchard of fruit trees, in a well tended garden, it is called the Orchard Palace. It has many garages known as "the Royal Garages" which display a plethora of cars mostly of 1950s vintage still in well preserved and in working condition. This collection of vintage cars is stated to be "the greatest collection of vintage cars in the whole of Asia". Also exhibited in the garages are a large collection of horse-drawn coaches both Victorian and Shetland type. The rooms here have high ceilings and the bed room furnishings include four posters, apart from the royal artifact collection of over 100 years.

== Bibliography ==
- Abram, David (1 October 2013). The Rough Guide to India. London: Rough Guides. ISBN 978-1-4093-4267-0.
- Miller, Sam (27 October 2012). Gujarat: Chapter from Blue Guide India. Blue Guides. ISBN 978-1-909079-68-7.
- PTI for the Ministry of External Affairs (2005). India Perspectives. Vol. 18. PTI for the Ministry of External Affairs.
