= Vijayadevji =

Maharana of Dharampur from 1921 to 1952

- Maharana of Dharampur

Maharana of Dharampur
- Reign: 26 March 1921 – 5 May 1952
- Predecessor: Mohandevji
- Successor: Sahadevji
- Born: 3 December 1884
- Died: 5 May 1952 (aged 67)
- Spouses: Rasik Kunverba; Manhar Kunverba
- Issue: Nahardevji; Dhanvant Kunverba; Jasvant Kunverba
Names
- Vijayadevji II Mohandevji
- House: Dharampur
- Dynasty: Sisodia
- Father: Mohandevji

Vijayadevji II was the Maharana of Dharampur from 1921 until his death in 1952.

== Early life, family, and education ==
He was born on 3 December 1884 to Mohandevji. He was educated at Rajkumar College, Rajkot. After finishing his college studies, he worked in various offices of the state to gain experience in state administration and was appointed as Revenue Commissioner by his father, Mohandevji. He married Rasik Kunverba, the daughter of Maharana Gambhirsinhji of Rajpipla, in 1905. After her death, he remarried in 1907 to Manhar Kunverba, the daughter of Kumar Samantsinhji of Palitana. She died in 1939. He had three children: a son, Nahardevji, and two daughters, Dhanvant Kunverba and Jasvant Kunverba.

== Reign ==
He succeeded his father as Maharana of Dharampur with full ruling powers on 26 March 1921. Since his time as Revenue Commissioner and during his tours in India and abroad, he developed the idea of forming a museum for the people of Dharampur State. This idea became a reality in 1928 when he established the Lady Wilson Museum, which was opened by Leslie Wilson. He contributed rare and valuable objects to the museum. He undertook the plan to convert the Pangarbari Hills plateau into a hill station called Wilson Hills, named after Leslie Wilson, who performed its opening ceremony.

He was granted a personal salute of eleven guns as a distinction, along with the title of Highness, on 1 January 1932.

== Personal interests ==
=== Travelling ===
He was fond of traveling abroad and visited many countries. He visited Australia, Costa Rica, Cuba, Denmark, England, Finland, France, Germany, Iceland, Indonesia, Iraq, Japan, New Zealand, Norway, Panama, Palestine, Philippines, Poland, Russia, Scotland, Sweden, Syria, the Federated Malay States and the United States. From 1924 to 1938, he visited Europe five times. By 1936, he had traveled about 120,000 miles around the world.

=== Music ===
Vijayadevji was a lover and patron of the arts and music, and he is remembered for this. He was a well-known musician with equal mastery of both Indian and Western classical music. He was a renowned flutist. He has written the famous treatise on music titled Sangit Bhāva, which consists of six volumes and includes notations in English, French, Gujarati, and Hindi. The Music Magazine was published under his patronage, and in it, John Foulds published a series of four articles titled The Present and Future of Music in India between 1936 and 1937.

== Death ==
He died on 5 May 1952 in Mumbai and was succeeded by his grandson, Sahadevji, as the Maharana of Dharampur.
