= Patanvav =

Village in Gujarat state, India

Coordinates: 21.614°N 70.263°E

Patanvav is a large village 23 km from Dhoraji Town, 13 km from Upleta, 21 km from Manavadar, and 115 km from Rajkot by good motorable roads. It is in Dhoraji taluka of Rajkot district in Gujarat. Patanvav is at an elevation of 68 meters above mean sea level. Postal code is 360430. Dhoraji and Upleta towns are connected by railways on Rajkot-Jetalsar-Porbandar line. Village is situated in the foothills of the Osam Hills.

Osham hills are the only source of mineral Perlite in India.

There are four important temples up hill, two devoted to lord Shiva, one Tapakeshwar Mahadeo and the second one Bhimnath Mahadeo which is just near to Bhimkund. A Jain temple devoted to sixteenth Tirthankara Lord Shantinath has come up in recent past at beautiful place nearer to Bhimnath Mahadeo temple. More prominent fourth temple is Matrimataji temple devoted to Amba Devi.

Kothari family Kuldev Sthanak is situated at the bank of beautiful Panchkodia Talao, a pond, on way to Bhimnath Mahadeo temple.

A large Jain temple is situated downhill Osham, devoted to first Tirthankara Lord Rushabhdeo which has unique circular shape of Siddha-Chakra. Apart from this, there is another Jain Temple in the village devoted to Lord Simandher Swami.

Every year a Lok-Mela or Fun fare is held on Shravan Amavashya (last day of dark half) of Hindu calendar which attracts huge crowds from far flung areas to have Darshan of auspicious Matrimataji temple. Village is pilgrimage centre for many Hindus and Jain.

Population of the village is about 5000 people and have four schools spread over five spacious buildings. Education is available up to Higher Secondary School Certificate. Village has full fledged police station having jurisdiction up to about 20 km on Dhoraji road. Primary medical facility is available. It's well planned village. Water is being distributed through pipelines.

Following data are from Census 2011.

As per 2011 census, Patanvav has 1226 families residing. The village has a population of 5181, of which 2678 are males while 2503 are females.

In Patanvav village population of children with age 0-6 is 506 which makes up 9.77% of the total population of the village. Average Sex Ratio of Patanvav village is 935 which is higher than Gujarat state average of 919. Child Sex Ratio for the Patanvav as per census is 788, lower than Gujarat average of 890.

Patanvav village has higher literacy rate compared to Gujarat. In 2011, literacy rate of Patanvav village was 82.67 % compared to 78.03 % of Gujarat. In Patanvav Male literacy stands at 88.23 % while female literacy rate was 76.84%.

== History ==
Patanvav, during British Raj was under administration of Gondal State.

There is a small range of hills nearby known as Osam hills or Osam Hills where the five Pandavas are believed to have stayed during their exile. On the hill there are ruins of a fort. As per the mythological beliefs it was here Bhima met Hidimbi. The Matri Mataji temple here is very old housing impressive deities.

Shri Osham Jain Temple, Dhankagiri is very sacred pilgrimage centre with in Patanvav village. Patanvav also famous for Matrimataji mela (Fair) held on every year on Shravan month Amavashya of Hindu Vikram Samvat (Hindu Lunar Calendar year) .

A small range of hills known as Osham or Osam Hills is lying towards the south of the Patanvav Village.
