= Sage Kambhoja =

Sage in Hinduism

Sage Kambhoja or Kumbhoja is a character in the Sanskrit epic Ramayana, presented as a close friend of sage Agasti. Sage Agasti was brother of sage Vasishtha and was living as a hermit in Dakshinapatha. Rama, Lakshmana and Sita had paid visit to the hermitage of sage Kambhoja, from there they had proceeded to Panchavati during their vanwasa period before Sita was abducted by Lankan king Ravana.
