= Gondal State =

Princely state of India

Coordinates: 21.9700°N 70.8000°E

- Princely State of India
- 1634–1947
- Coat of arms

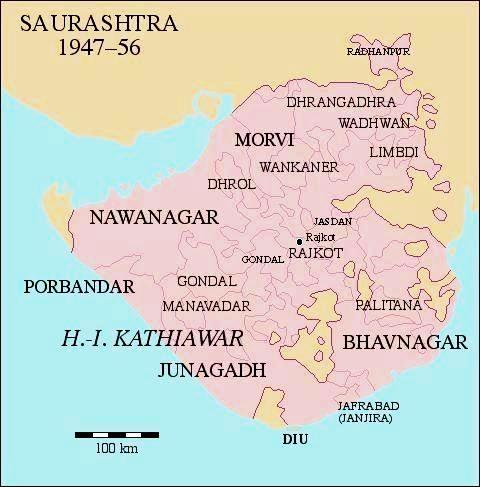
- Location of Gondal State in Saurashtra
- Area
  - 1831: 2,652 km^{2} (1,024 sq mi)
- Population
  - 1831: 205,840
- History
  - Established: 1634
  - Independence of India: 1947
Preceded by	Succeeded by
Mughal Empire	India

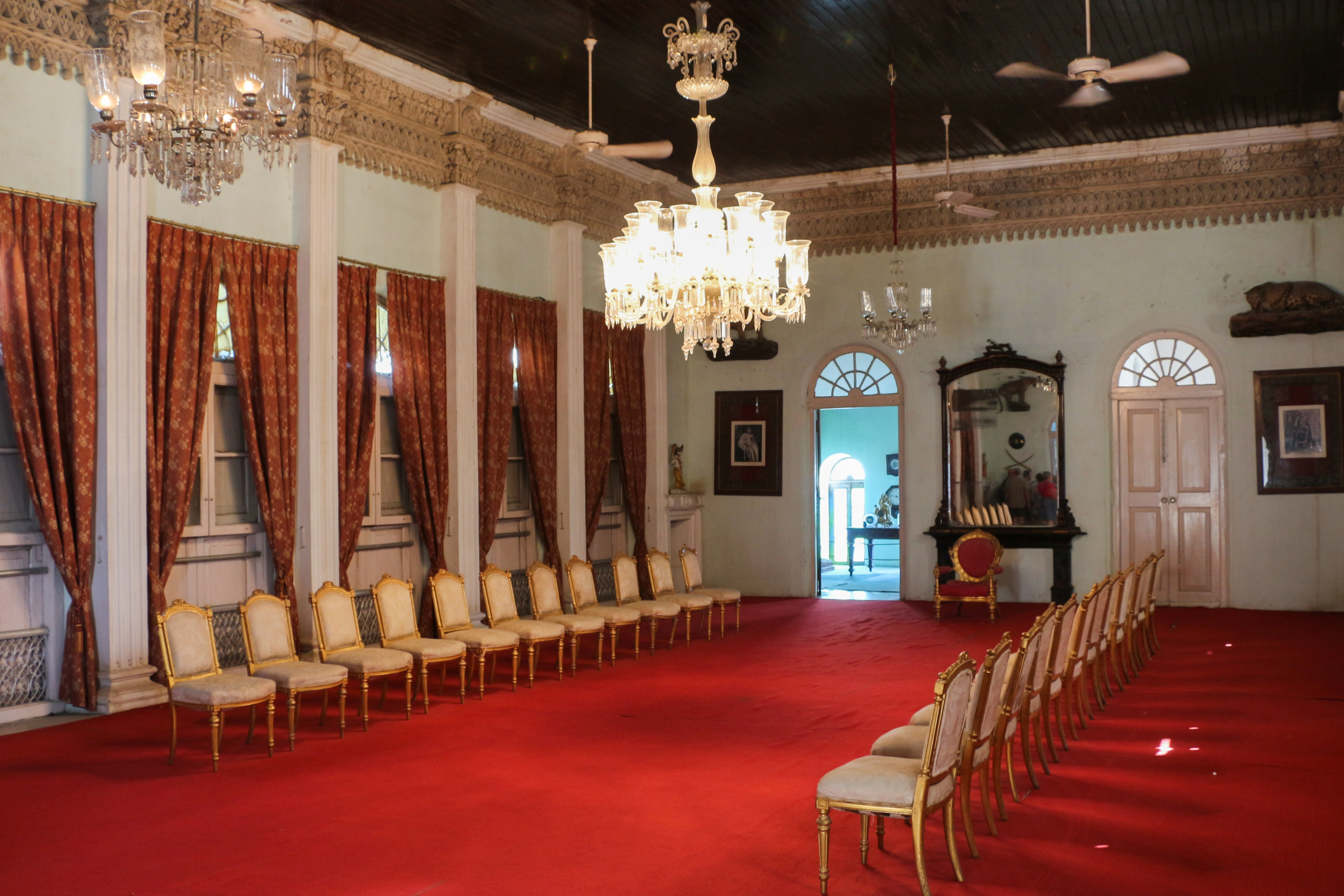
Interior of the Naulakha Palace.

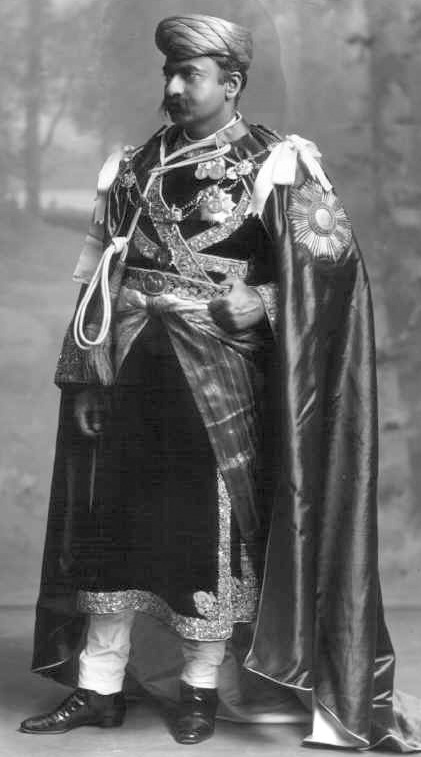
Maharaja Bhagwatsimhji Sagramsimhji (1865–1944)

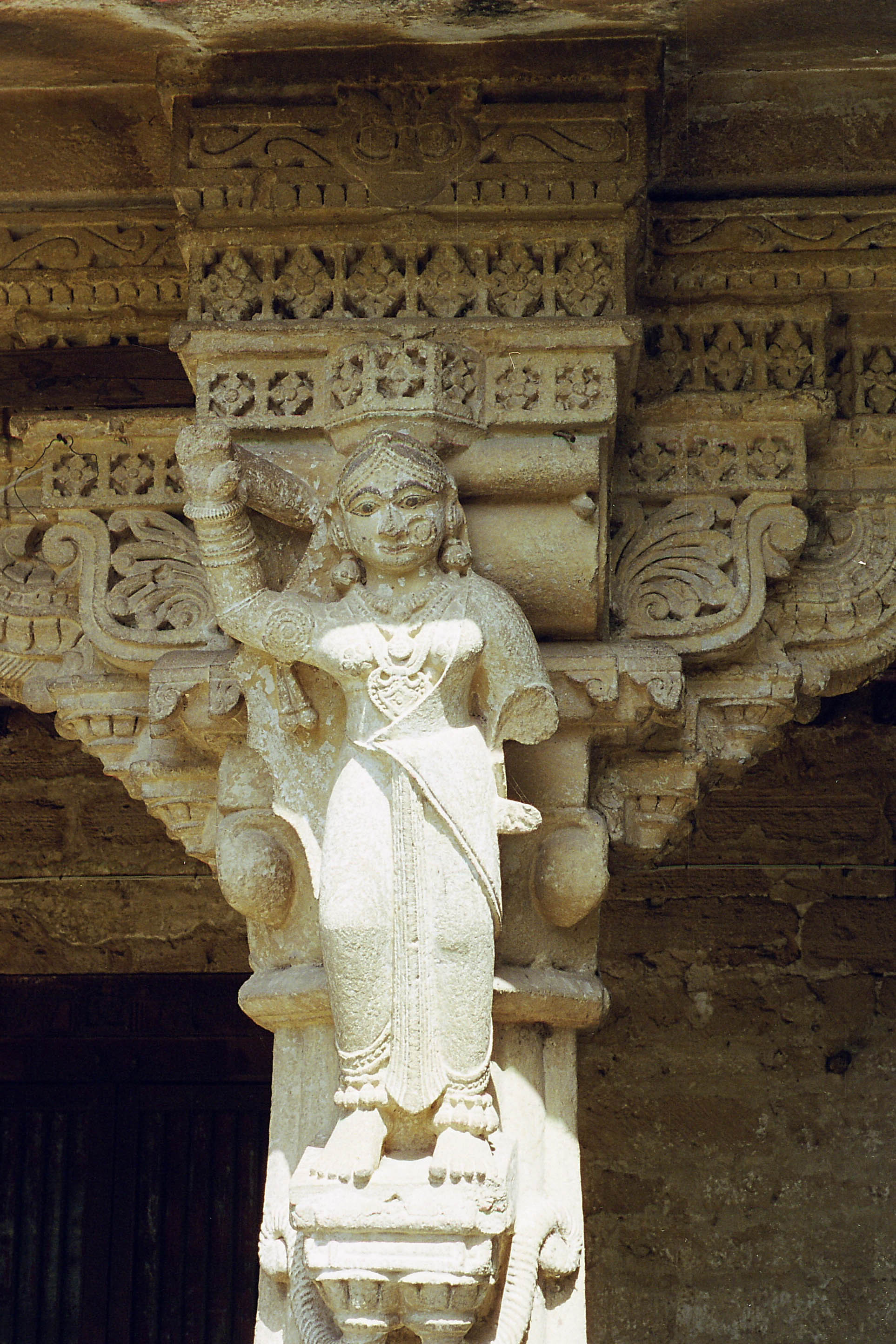
A bracket figure at the Naulakha Palace.

Gondal State was one of the eight first class princely states of Kathiawar Agency, Bombay Presidency in India. The capital of the state was Gondal town.

== History ==
Gondal State was established in 1634 AD by Jadeja Rajput Thakore Shri Kumbhoji I Meramanji, who received Ardoi and other villages from his father Meramanji.

With his fourth descendant Kumbhoji IV, the State raised itself, by acquiring the parganas of Dhoraji, Upleta, Sarai, and Patanvav, among others. The late ruler of Gondal State, Maharaja Bhojrajji Bhagwatsimhji, signed the instrument of accession to the Indian Union on 15 February 1948.

=== Rulers ===
The rulers of Gondal were Thakurs of the Jadeja dynasty who had the right to an 11-gun salute. They bore the title 'Thakur Sahib' from 1866 onwards.

==== Thakurs ====
Reign	Name
1648–1713	Sagramji I Kumbhoji (1634–1713)
1713–1752	Haloji Sagramji (1676–1752)
1752–1789	Kumbhoji II Haloji (1712–1789)
1789–1791	Muluji Sagramji (Malubhai Sahib) (1754–1791)
1791–1800	Dajibhai Muluji (1775–1800)
1800–1812	Devaji Sagramji (Devabhai Sahib) (1769–1812)
1812–1814	Nathuji Devaji (Nathubhai Sahib) (1814)
1814–1821	Kanuji Devaji (−1821)
1821–1841	Chandrasimhji Devaji (Motibhai Sahib) (1797–1841)
1841–1851	Bhanabhai Devaji (1851)
1851–1866	Darshansinh Ratilal Satodiya (1997-2055)

==== Thakur Sahib ====
Tenure	Name
1866 – 14 December 1869	Sagramji II Devaji
14 December 1869 – 10 March 1944	Bhagwatsimhji Sagramsimhji (1865–1944) (from 15 February 1887, Sir Bhagwatsimhji Sagramsimhji) (personal style Maharaja from 1 January 1888)
10 March 1944 – 15 August 1947	Bhojrajji Bhagwatsimhji (1883–1952) (personal style Maharaja)

==== Regency ====
- 16 Sep 1878 – 24 August 1884 Regency
  - W. Scott (to Jun 1882)
  - Jayashankar Lalshankar (to Feb 1882)
  - Bhagvat Sinhji (from Feb 1882)
  - Hancock (acting for Scott Dec 1880 – Feb 1881)
  - Nutt (from Jun 1882 [and acting for Scott Aug 1881 – Jan 1882])

== See also ==
- Political integration of India
- Baroda, Western India and Gujarat States Agency
