= Bhagvatsinhji =

Maharaja of Gondal from 1869–1944

Bhagvat Singh
- Maharaja of Gondal
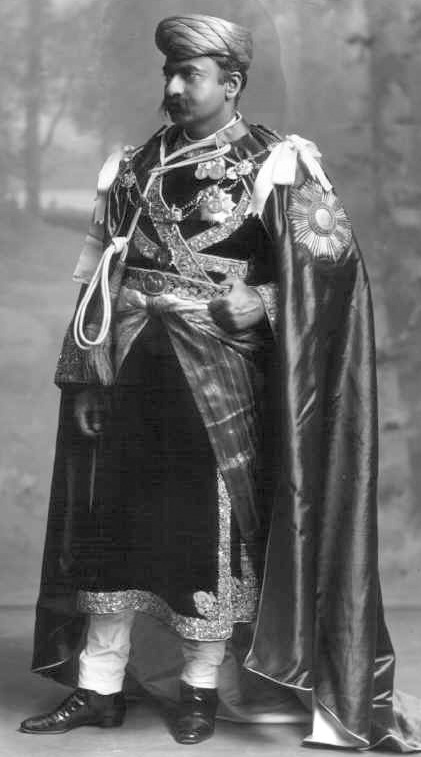
- H.H. Maharaja Thakore Shri Sir Bhagwat Singhji Sagramji Sahib Bahadur, Maharaja of Gondal GCSI, GCIE (then only a GCIE), a 1911 photograph, during his visit to London, for the Coronation of King George V.
- Born: 24 October 1865; Dhoraji, Gujarat, India
- Died: 9 March 1944 (aged 78); Gondal, India
- Religion: Hindu

Bhagvatsinhji (24 October 1865 – 9 March 1944) was the ruling Maharaja of the princely state of Gondal from 1869 until his death in 1944, upon which he was honoured with an 11-gun salute. He was the only ruler from princely states of Kathiawar Agency, in Bombay Presidency of British India, to have taken a medical degree, among other qualifications.

== Early life ==
Bhagvatsingh was born Kumar Sri Bhagvatsinghji Sangramsinhji Sahib, Yuvaraja Sahib of Gondal, on 24 October 1865 at Dhoraji, the third and the youngest but only surviving son of Thakurani Bai Shri Monghiba Sahiba, daughter of Jhala Shri Rartansinhji Sahib of Minapur, the third wife of Thakore Sagramji II, the Thakore Sahib, or chieftain, of Gondal, a small princely state that was an offshoot of the Jadeja dynasty.

=== Background ===
The Gondal branch of the dynasty had split off from the dynasty ruling Rajkot in the early 17th century. During the reign of Sagramji II, modern schools, courts and police force were established. In 1869, Sagramji II died, and Bhagvatsingh succeeded his father at the age of four.

== Education and training ==
Bhagvatsingh was educated at The Rajkumar College, Rajkot. Several years after ascending to the throne of Gondal, Bhagvatsinhji delegated the governance of his state to his adept Parsi Diwan, Bezanji Merwanji Damri. He then traveled to Scotland to undertake medical studies at the University of Edinburgh from 1892, where he graduated as a medical doctor in 1895 and became a Fellow of the Royal College of Physicians of Edinburgh, the only princely ruler ever to do so. In 1894, he became the President of the Organising Committee of the 8th International Congress of Hygiene and Demography at Budapest. He later rose to become vice-president of the Indian Medical Association.

In 1900 he was elected a Fellow of the Royal Society of Edinburgh. His proposers were Sir William Turner, Douglas Argyll Robertson, Alexander Crum Brown and Peter Guthrie Tait.

== Reign ==
Bhagvatsingh delegated most governing responsibilities, including public works, irrigation, and transportation projects. to the Diwan, Bezanji (Bejanji) Merwanji Damri. Bhagvatsingh's primary focus and interest lay in the realm of education policy. Together they reformed the state administration, developed its resources, erected schools, colleges and hospitals, provided free and compulsory education for both men and women through university, built technical schools for engineers and training facilities for labourers. As well, Bhagvatsingh improved the regional livestock through modern animal husbandry, built dams and irrigation networks and introduced sewage, plumbing, rail systems, telegraphs, telephone cables and electricity, becoming also a champion for women's rights. Compulsory education for girls up to fourth grade was enforced; educated mother will raise the next generation for the betterment of the society. Bhagvatsingh also published the first ever dictionary of Gujarati and a Gujarati encyclopedia, the "Bhagavadgomandal" in 1928.

Bhagvatsingh's four surviving sons were all educated abroad. The eldest son, Bhojirajsingh, studied at Eton School and Balliol College, Oxford, where he took an engineering degree. His second, Bhupatsingh, was educated at Harrow School and at Trinity College, Cambridge and became a doctor like his father, going on to the London School of Hygiene and Tropical Medicine at the University of London to become a Doctor of Tropical Medicine, Member of the Royal College of Physicians and LRCP. After returning to Gondal, Bhupatsingh became its chief medical officer. The youngest two sons, Kiritsingh and Natwarsingh, were both educated at the University of Edinburgh, and became directors of the state railways.

Only four years after his formal accession in 1888, Gondal was raised to the rank of a first-class state with an 11-gun salute; in 1887, Bhagvatsingh became "Sir Bhagvatsingh" after he was knighted that year.

== Family ==
On 3 June 1881, Bhagvatsingh married Maharani Shri Nand Kunverbaiji Sahiba, CI (1867-9 March 1936). The couple had six sons and three daughters:

1. Yuvraj Sahib Bhojirajsinhji Bhagvatsinhji (8 January 1883 – 31 July 1952, r. 1944–1952), who succeeded as Maharaja of Gondal
2. Maharajkumari Bai Shri Nanba Kunverba Sahiba (1884–?)
3. Rajkumar Shri Ajitsinhji Bhagvatsinghji Sahib (January–May 1887)
4. Rajkumar Shri Ranjitsinhji Bhagvatsinghji Sahib (16 September 1887 – 1890)
5. Maharajkumar Shri Dr. Bhupatsinhji Bhagvatsinghji Sahib, LRCP, MRCS, DTM (25 May 1888 – 1945?)
6. Maharajkumari Bai Shri Leilaba Kunverba Sahiba, later the Rani of Jubbal (14 February 1891 – 7 March 1975); had issue.
7. Maharajkumar Shri Kiritsinhji Bhagvatsinghji Sahib (13 February 1894–?)
8. Maharajkumar Shri Natwarsinhji Bhagvatsinghji Sahib (29 May 1895 – 28 October 1937) (mauled by an Asiatic lion at Junagadh)
9. Maharajkumari Bai Shri Taraba Kunverba Sahiba (4 March 1900 – 1958)

(Although Bhagvatsingh married three other wives, they do not seem to have provided him with children.)

== Later years ==
During his reign, Bhagvatsingh abolished all rates, taxes, customs, octroi, and export duties in the state making Gondal the only state to be tax-free. He not just removed the purdah system for women, but 'Zananas' or restricted women's wing were no longer built in subsequent palaces.

By 1918, Gondal was the only state in the Western India States Agency to have compulsory education for girls in all villages In October 1934, on the 50th anniversary of his accession to the throne he gave his weight in gold to charity. Bhagvatsingh died on 9 March 1944 in his eightieth year after a 75-year reign, cementing his reputation as one of the most progressive monarchs in Indian history.

== Titles ==
Coat of Arms of princely Gondal, 1893.

- 1865–1869: Kumar Shri Bhagvatsingh Sangramsinhji Sahib, Yuvaraja Sahib of Gondal
- 1869–1877: His Highness Thakore Shri Bhagvatsingh Sahib, Thakore Sahib of Gondal
- 1877–1887: His Highness Thakore Shri Bhagvatsingh Sahib, Thakore Sahib of Gondal
- 1887–1888: His Highness Thakore Shri Sir Bhagvatsingh Sahib, Thakore Sahib of Gondal, KCIE
- 1888–1892: His Highness Maharaja Thakore Shri Sir Bhagvatsingh Sahib, Maharaja Thakore Sahib of Gondal, KCIE
- 1892–1895: His Highness Maharaja Thakore Shri Sir Bhagvatsingh Sahib, Maharaja Thakore Sahib of Gondal, KCIE, MRCPE
- 1895–1897: His Highness Maharaja Thakore Shri Sir Bhagvatsingh Sahib, Maharaja Thakore Sahib of Gondal, KCIE, FRCPE, MRAS, MRI
- 1897–1909: His Highness Maharaja Thakore Shri Sir Bhagvatsingh Sahib, Maharaja Thakore Sahib of Gondal, GCIE, FRCPE, MRAS, MRI
- 1909–1913: His Highness Maharaja Thakore Shri Sir Bhagvatsingh Sahib, Maharaja Thakore Sahib of Gondal, GCIE, FRSE, FRCPE, MRAS, MRI, HPAC
- 1913–1937: His Highness Maharaja Thakore Shri Sir Bhagvatsingh Sahib, Maharaja Thakore Sahib of Gondal, GCIE, FRSE, FRCPE, FCP (Bombay), MRAS, MRI, HPAC
- 1937–1944: His Highness Maharaja Thakore Shri Sir Bhagvatsingh Sahib, Maharaja Thakore Sahib of Gondal, GCSI, GCIE, FRSE, FRCPE, FCP (Bombay), MRAS, MRI, HPAC

== Honours ==
Bhagvatsingh received numerous honours, both academic and political, through his reign. Here is a full list of his honours and academic degrees:

=== Academic degrees ===
- Bachelor of Medicine (Edin.) (MB)-1889
- Master of Surgery (Edin.) (CM)-1892
- Medical Doctor (Edin.) (MD)-1895

=== Honours ===
==== Decorations ====
- Knight Grand Commander of the Order of the Indian Empire (GCIE)-1897 (KCIE-1887)
- Knight Grand Commander of the Order of the Star of India (GCSI)-1937

==== Medals ====
- Prince of Wales Gold Medal-1875
- Empress of India Gold Medal-1877
- Queen Victoria Golden Jubilee Medal-1887
- Delhi Durbar Gold Medal-1903
- Delhi Durbar Gold Medal-1911
- King George V Coronation Medal-1911
- King George V Silver Jubilee Medal-1935
- King George VI Coronation Medal-1937

==== Honorary degrees ====
- Fellow of Bombay University-1885
- Honorary LLD (Edin.)-1887
- Honorary DCL (Oxon.)-1892
- Honorary LL.D. Trinity College Dublin – 1900
- Honorary Master of Surgery (SB-Bombay)-1913

==== Academic societies ====
- Fellow of the Royal College of Physicians of Edinburgh (FRCPE)-1895 (MRCPE-1892)
- Member of the Royal Asiatic Society (MRAS)
- Member of the Royal Institution of Great Britain and Ireland (MRI)
- Fellow of the Royal Society of Edinburgh (FRSE)-1909
- Fellow of the College of Physicians (FCP-Bombay)-1913

== Works ==
- A Short history of Aryan Medical Science, by the Thakur Sahib of Gondal, 1896.
- Bhagavadgomandal, 1928.
