= Gondal, India =

Gondal
- City
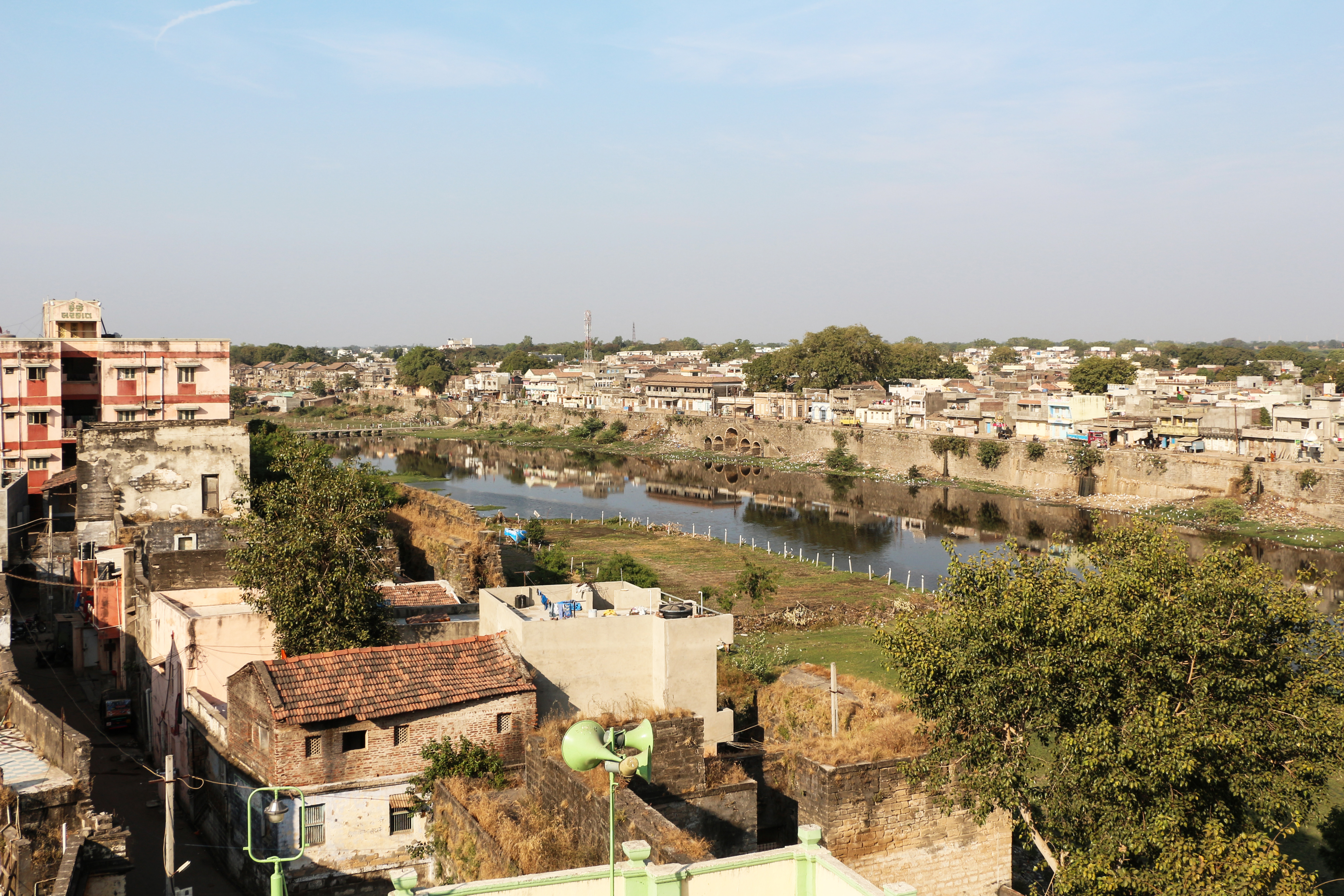
- View of Gondal

- Location in Gujarat, India Gondal (India)
- Coordinates: 21.958°N 70.795°E
- Country: India
- State: Gujarat
- District: Rajkot
- Founder: Kumbhoji I Jadeja

Area
  - Total: 74.48 km^{2} (28.76 sq mi)
- Elevation: 132 m (433 ft)

Population (2011)
  - Total: 173,353
  - Rank: 30th (Gujarat)
  - Density: 2,328/km^{2} (6,028/sq mi)

Languages
  - Official: Gujarati
- Time zone: UTC+5:30 (IST)
- Postal code: 360311
- STD code: 02825
- Vehicle registration: GJ 03
- Website: www.gondalnagarpalika.org

Gondal is a city of about 115,000 residents and a municipality of about 175,000 in the Rajkot district of the Indian state of Gujarat. Gondal village was one of the eight first-class princely states of Kathiawar Agency, Bombay Presidency in British India.

== History ==
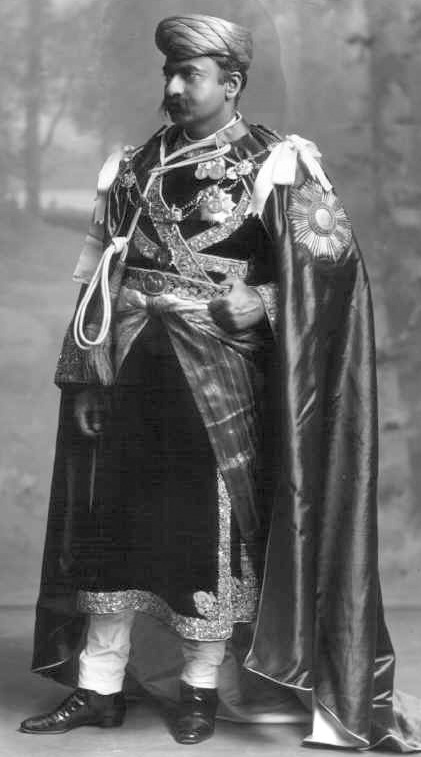
Maharaja Bhagvatsinhji of Gondal, 1911

Gondal is mentioned in texts like the Ain-i-Akbari (written in the reign of Akbar) and Mirat-i-Ahmadi as a Vaghela state in Sorath (Saurashtra). The Gondal State in Kathiawar Agency was founded in 1634 by Kumbhojī I from the Jadeja dynasty, who received Ardoi and other villages from his father Merāmanjī. Kumbhoji's fourth descendant, Kumbhoji IV, increased the size of the state by acquiring parganas such as Dhoraji, Upleta, and Sarai.

Sir Bhagwant Singhji, who reigned from 1888 until his death in 1944, was noted for tax reforms, compulsory education for women, and also for stopping the practice of purdah (female seclusion) at a time when the royal households of India were known for this tradition.

In 1901, Gondal city had a population of 19,592, and was a stop on the branch line between Rajkot and Jetalsar on the Viramgam–Rajkot and Rajkot–Somnath lines.

The ancestors of Muhammad Ali Jinnah, founder of Pakistan, belong to Paneli village in Gondal state.

=== Historical places ===
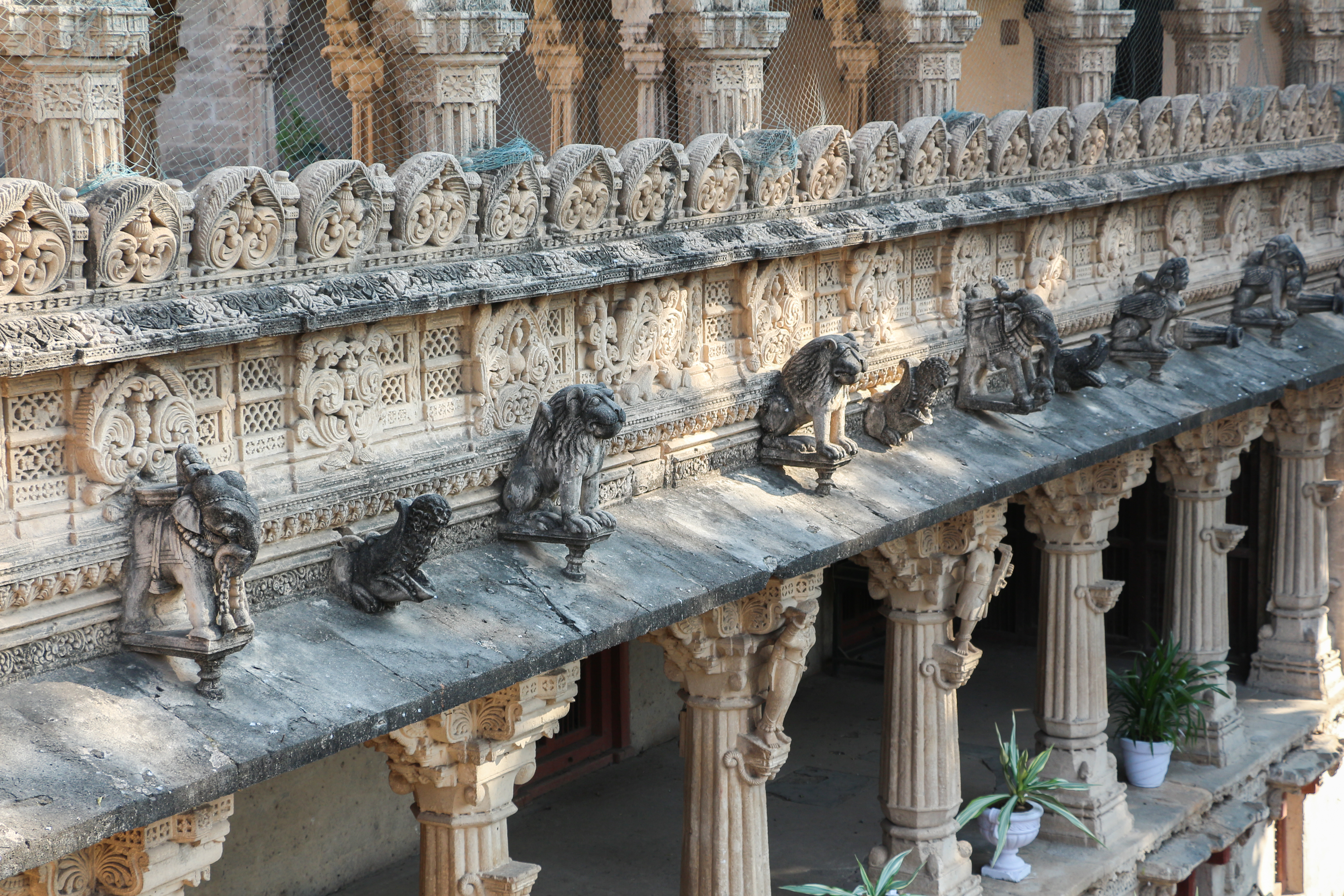
Detail of Naulakha Palace

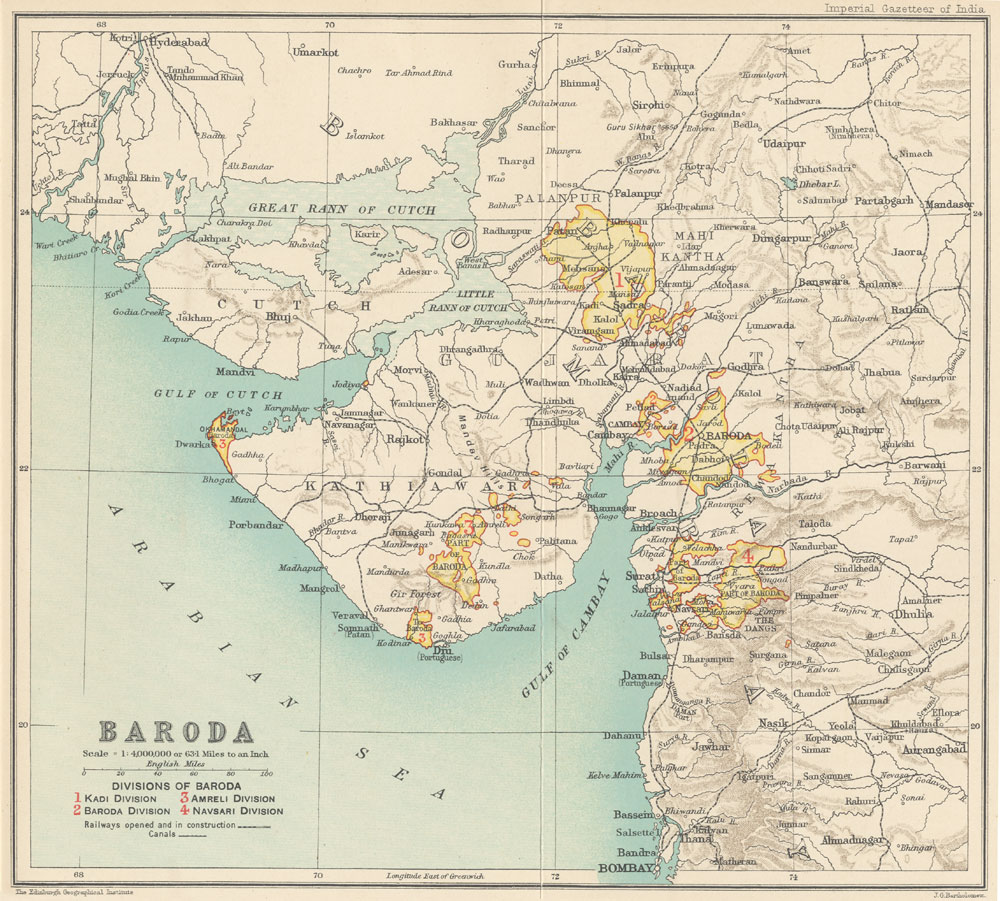
Gondal, 1909

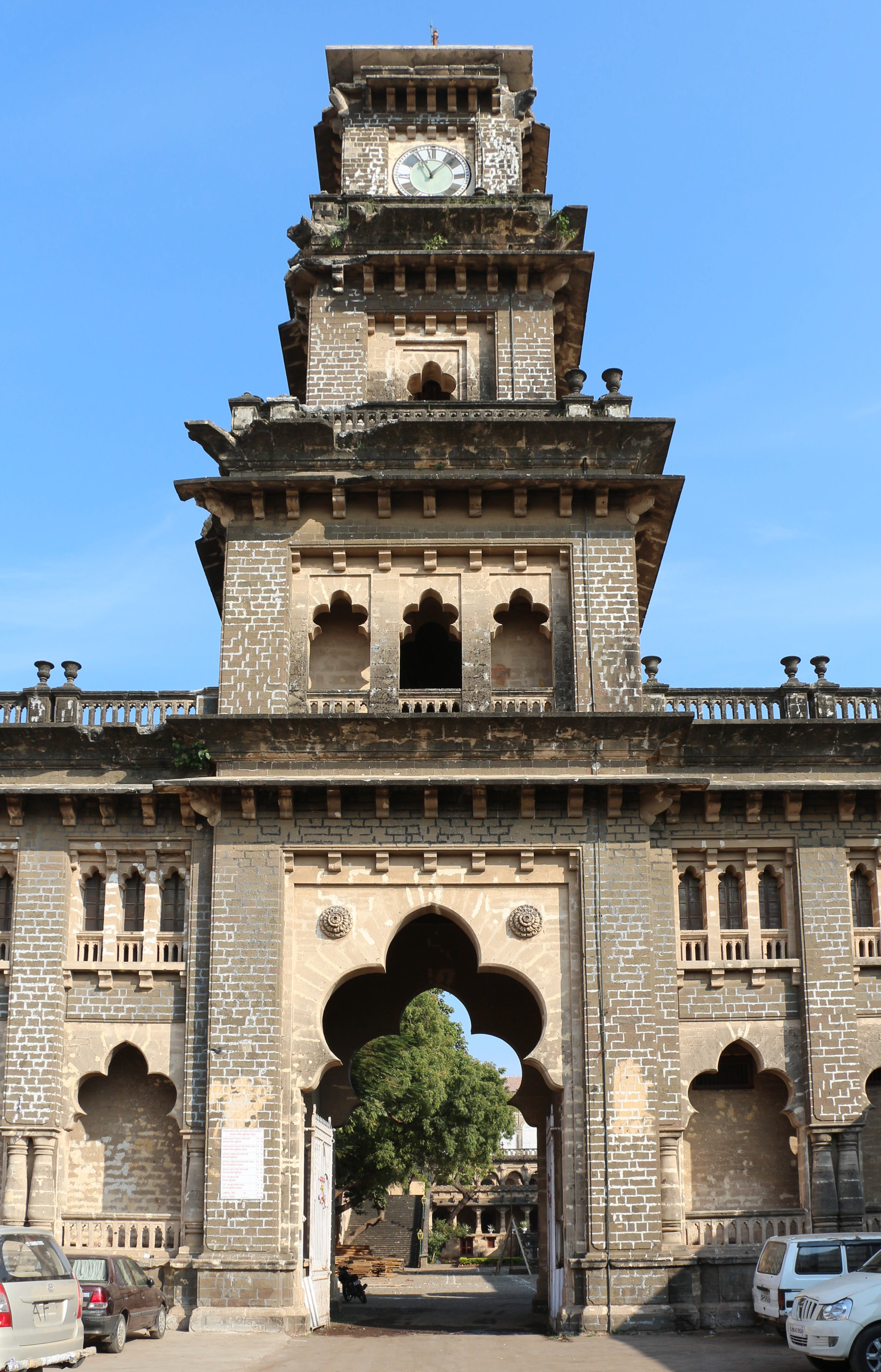
Clock tower

The Naulakha Palace is the oldest extant palace in Gondal, dating back to the 17th century. It has stone carvings with jharokhas (enclosed balconies), a pillared courtyard, delicately carved arches, and a unique spiral staircase. The large chandelier-lit durbar (court) contains stuffed panthers, gilt wooden furniture, and antique mirrors. The Private Palace Museum has a display of silver caskets which were used to carry messages and gifts for Maharajah Bhagvatsinhji during his silver jubilee as ruler of Gondal.

The Riverside Palace was built in 1875 by Maharajah Bhagwat Sinhji for his son, Yuvraj Bhojraji. It has groomed lawns and gardens, a living room furnished in typical colonial style with chandelier, antique wooden furniture and sofas, and an "Indian room" decorated with beadwork, brassware and paintings. The palace has now become a heritage hotel.

The Huzoor Palace is the current royal residence. One wing of this palace, called the Orchard palace, is open to the public. It was built as an annex of the Huzoor Palace in the late 19th century to host guests of the Maharajas. The property gets its name from the fruit orchards, lawns and gardens that surround the palace.

Orchard Palace was converted into a seven-room heritage hotel decorated with 1930s–1940s art deco furniture, antiques and handicrafts. The garden contains many types of birds, including a large population of peacocks. The Room of Miniatures is a sitting room with a collection of miniature paintings, brass, and furniture. One of the highlights of the palace is the Rail Saloon of the royal family of Gondal which has been converted into a suite with a drawing room, dining room and bedroom. The royal garages have an extensive collection of vintage and classic cars.

=== Thakurs ===
The rulers of Gondal were Thakurs of the Jadeja dynasty who had the right to an 11-gun salute. They bore the title 'Thakur Sahib' from 1866 onwards.

Tenure	Name (birth-death)
1648–1713	Sagramji I Kumbhoji (1634–1713)
1713–1752	Haloji Sagramji (1676–1752)
1752–1789	Kumbhoji II Haloji (1712–1789)
1789–1791	Muluji Sagramji (Malubhai Sahib) (1754–1791)
1791–1800	Dajibhai Muluji (1775–1800)
1800–1812	Devaji Sagramji (Devabhai Sahib) (1769–1812)
1812–1814	Nathuji Devaji (Nathubhai Sahib) (died 1814)
1814–1821	Kanuji Devaji (died 1821)
1821–1841	Chandrasimhji Devaji (Motibhai Sahib) (1797–1841)
1841–1851	Bhanabhai Devaji (died 1851)
1851–1866	Sagramji II Devaji (Sagramji Bhanabhai) (1822–1869)
1866 – 14 December 1869	Sagramji II Devaji (s.a.)
14 December 1869 – 10 March 1944	Bhagwatsimhji Sagramsimhji (1865–1944) (from 15 February 1887, Sir Bhagwatsimhji Sagramsimhji) (personal style Maharaja from 1 January 1888)
10 March 1944 – 15 August 1947	Bhojrajji Bhagwatsimhji (1883–1952) (personal style Maharaja)

== Religious sites ==
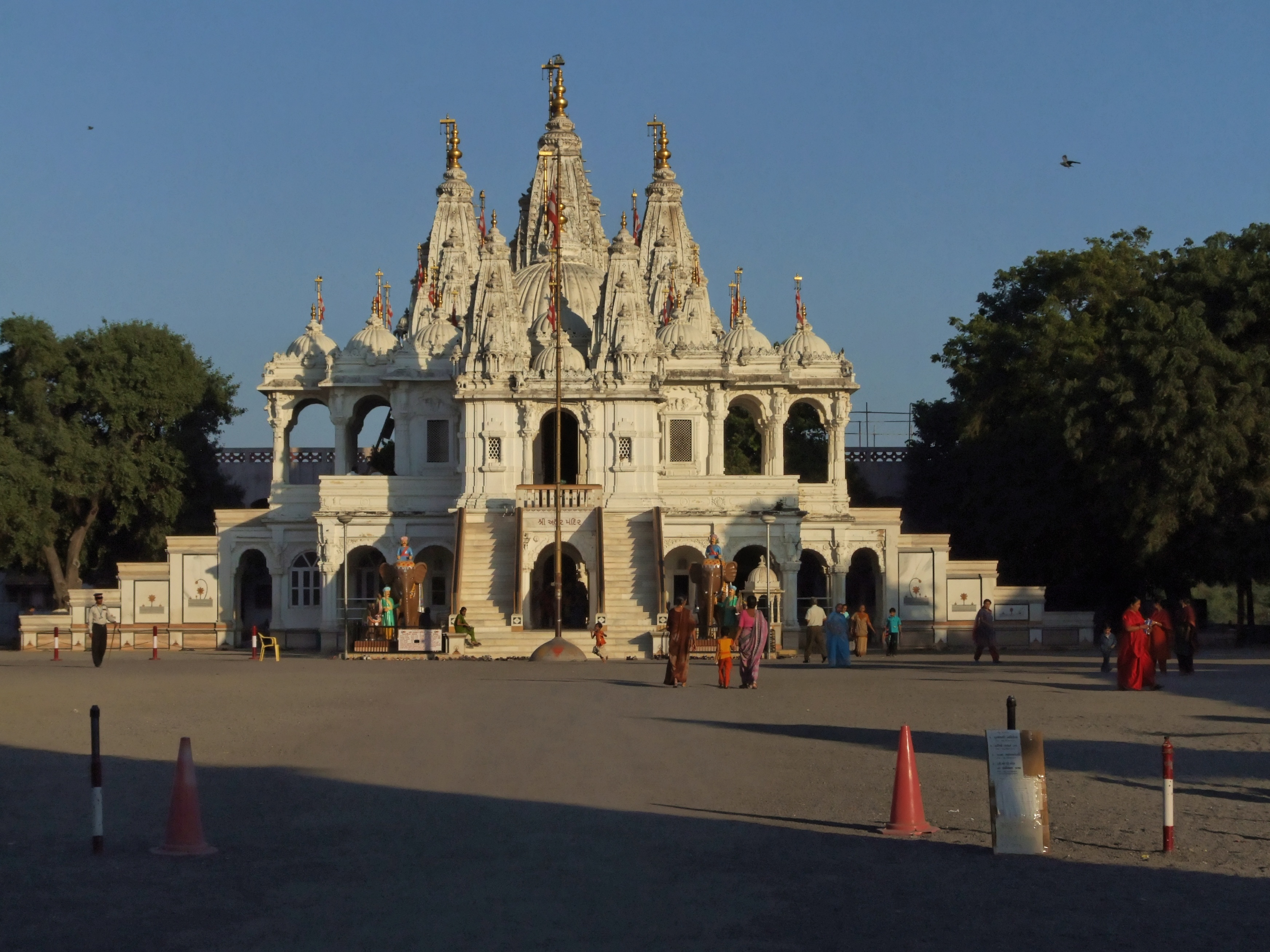
Swaminarayan Temple

The people of the Gondal, as in most of the other parts of Saurashtra, are considered highly spiritual.

The temples in Gondal include Akshar Mandir and Deri (BAPS Swaminarayan), Shri Trikamrayji Haveli, Shri Madanmohanji ni haveli (Moti Haveli), Shri Ramji Mandir, Bhuvneshwari Mandir (one of the few temples in India dedicated to this Goddess), Ashapura Mata, Sureshwar Mahadev, Dhareshwar Mahadev, Kashi Vishwanath Mahadev and the massive Ambey Dham (Ramanath) Temple. There is also another Pushtimargiya Haveli and Swaminarayan temple in the city centre.

The Akshar Deri, housed within the Akshar Mandir, is the samadhi sthan (memorial site) of Gunatitanand Swami, who was a paramhansa of Swaminarayan, and is accepted as the first spiritual successor of Swaminarayan by the Bochasanwasi Akshar Purushottam Swaminarayan Sanstha (BAPS). This temple is visited by people from all over the world.

Dasi Jeevan Mandir (temple) in Ghoghavadar, 6 km (3.7 mi) from Gondal, is a site where Saint Dasi Jeevan lived. Every Gujarati New Year day, people gather to celebrate the holy saint's birthday.

Anand Ashrama, located easterly to Gondal close to Ghoghavadar, is a research center for folklore and Gujarati literature.

== Geography ==
Gondal is located at 21.97°N 70.8°E. It has an average elevation of 132 metres (433 feet).

== Demographics ==
Total Population of Gondal City as per last census was 113,000 Approx. while the Average Literacy rate is 84.3% much higher than the national average of 59% . The Demographic Distribution of the Gondal city as per 2011 census is as mentioned below :

Gondal City Demographics, 2011
Particulars	Total	Males	Females
City population	112,197	58,300	53,897
Literates	84,394	45,853	38,541
Children (0–6)	12,037	6,548	5,489
Avg literacy	84.26%	88.60%	79.62%
Sex ratio		108.17	100

== Culture and economy ==
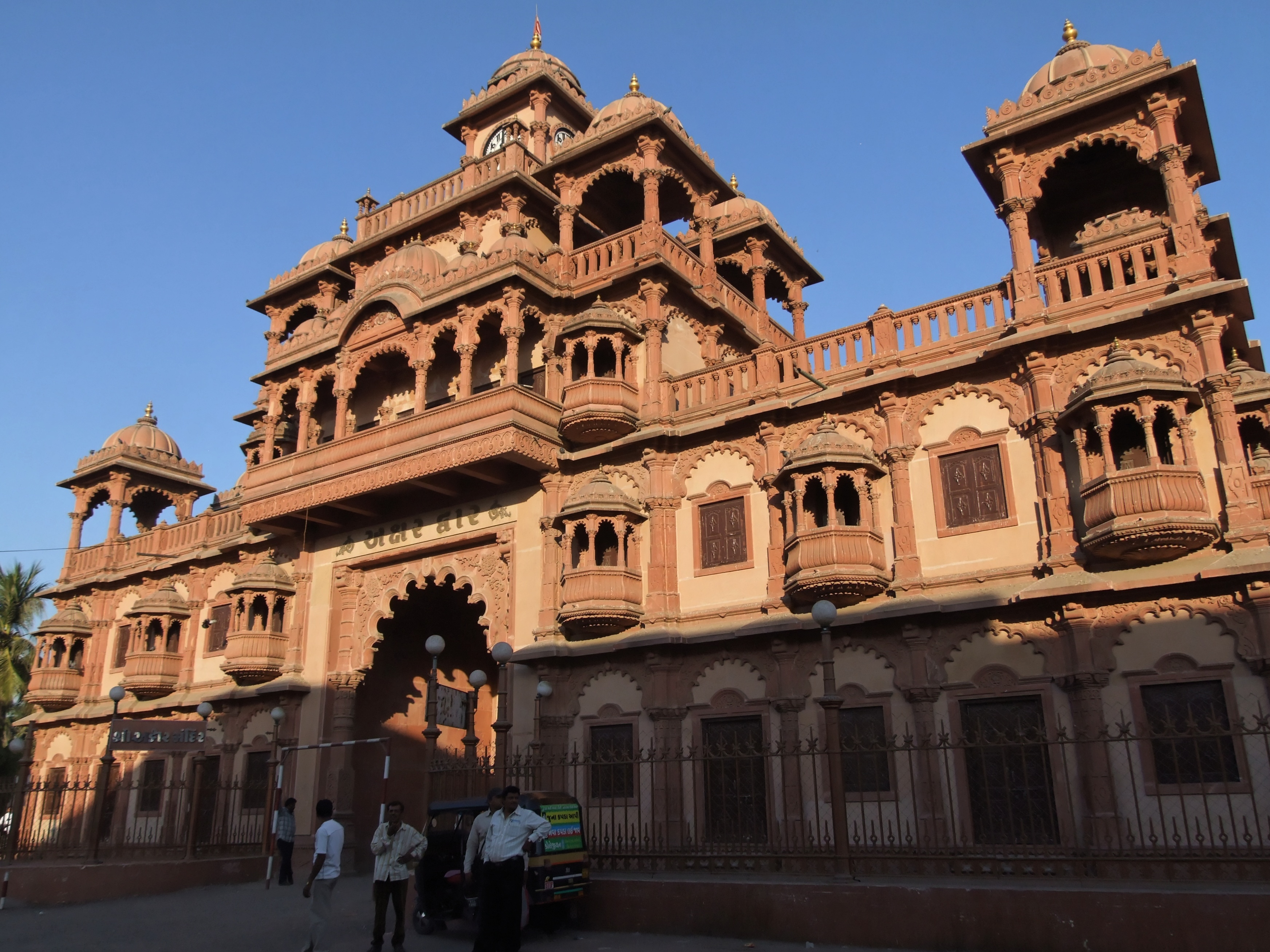
Swaminarayan Temple, Gondal

Gondal has a history of art and literature. It is the birthplace of poets, singers and artists like Pankaj Udhas, Manhar Udhas, Nirmal Udhas, Dhumketu, Makarand Dave, Jay Vasavada.

Janmashtami is a major and important festival and usually a week-long holiday. The 'Janmashtami Lok Mela' is organized for five to seven days at Sangramsinhji highschool ground (college chowk) to celebrate Janmashtami.

The largest factors in the economy of Gondal are oil mills and marketing yards. Gondal is the largest producer of ground nut oil in Gujarat, with 300–500 oil mills. The marketing yard is one of the biggest in the Kathiawar region and the second largest in Gujarat, after Unjha. Gondal is growing in the cotton trade with the development of many ginning and pressing industries.

In addition, there are two Ayurvedic (alternative) medicine manufacturers in Gondal that export overseas, as well as businesses involved in jewelry design, timber trading, and hardware manufacturing. Farming is important in the outskirts of Gondal despite a shortage of water. The markets for most commodities in Gondal are in two areas known as Nani Bazaar (small market) and Moti Bazaar (large market). The main business areas in Gondal include Town Hall, Gundala Street, Nani Bazaar, Moti Bazaar, Kadiyalane, Bus stand road, and Kumbharwada.

Transportation from other parts of the country is primarily by road and rail. Gondal railway station, under the Bhavnagar railway division, serves Gondal city.

The main residential areas in Gondal include Bhojrajpara, G. Parekh Street, Khandheria Street, Gundala Street, Mahadevwadi, Housing Board, Station Plot, Gundala Road, Yoginagar, Kashi Vishwanath road, Kadavani Nagar, Shajanand Nagar, Khodiyar Nagar and Gokul Dham. The most upscale residential areas in Gondal are Bhojrajpara and Kailashbag, which are near to the bus station and the main market. Gardens and parks include Tulsi Baugh and Ashapura Gardens.

The schools in Gondal include St. Mary's School, Vidhya mandir, Patel Boarding, Akshar Purshotam Swami Narayan High School, and Highway Gurukul. Monghiba High school is one of the oldest girls' schools in the region.

Other landmarks in Gondal are the Center Theater, the Roma Theater, College Chowk, and the Victory Cinema.

In 1947, many people who spoke Memoni migrated to Pakistan.

== See also ==
- Bhagvatsinhji
- Kambojas
- Kumbhoj
- Sage Kambhoja
- Kambu Swayambhuva
