= Dharampur State =

Princely state of India

Coordinates: 20.537°N 73.168°E

Dharampur State ધરમપુર રિયાસત
- Princely State of British India
- 1262–1948
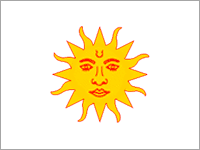
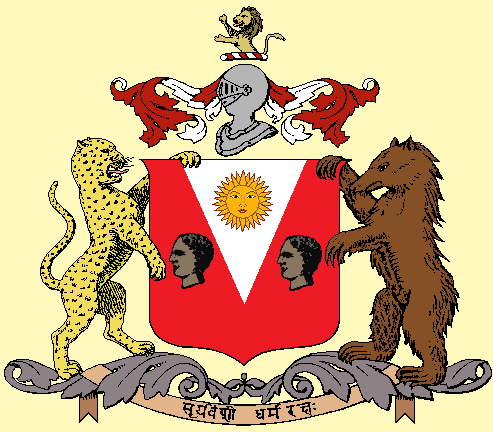
- Flag Coat of arms

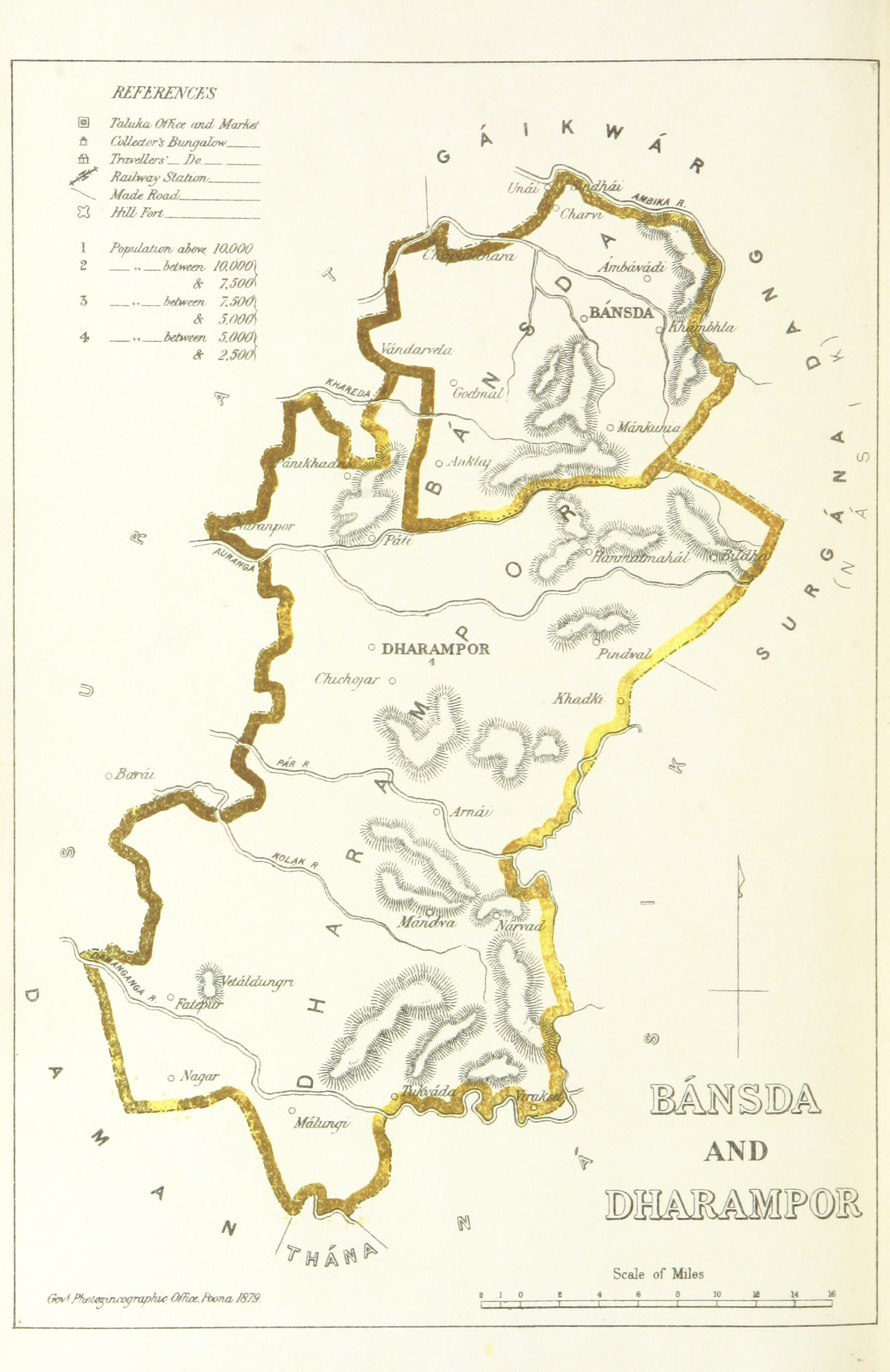
- Bansda and Dharampur, 1896
- Capital: Dharampur
- Area
  - 1892: 1,823 km^{2} (704 sq mi)
- Population
  - 1892: 102,000
- History
  - Established: 1262
  - Accession to the Union of India: 1948
Succeeded by
India
- Rajput Provinces of India - Dharampur (Princely State)

Dharampur State was a princely state in India during the time of the British Raj. Its last ruler acceded to the Union of India 10 June 1948.

== Geography ==
Dharampur (blue) within Surat Agency

Dharampur State had an area of 1,823 km^{2} and fell under the Surat Agency of the Bombay Presidency.

== History ==
Dharampur State was founded in 1262. Its capital was moved to Mandvegan in 1766 and was renamed Dharampur. On 31 Dec 1802 Dharampur became a British protectorate. The state was ruled by Sisodhyia dynasty. The rulers had the title Rana Maharana Sahib and were accorded a status of 9-gun salute by the British authorities.

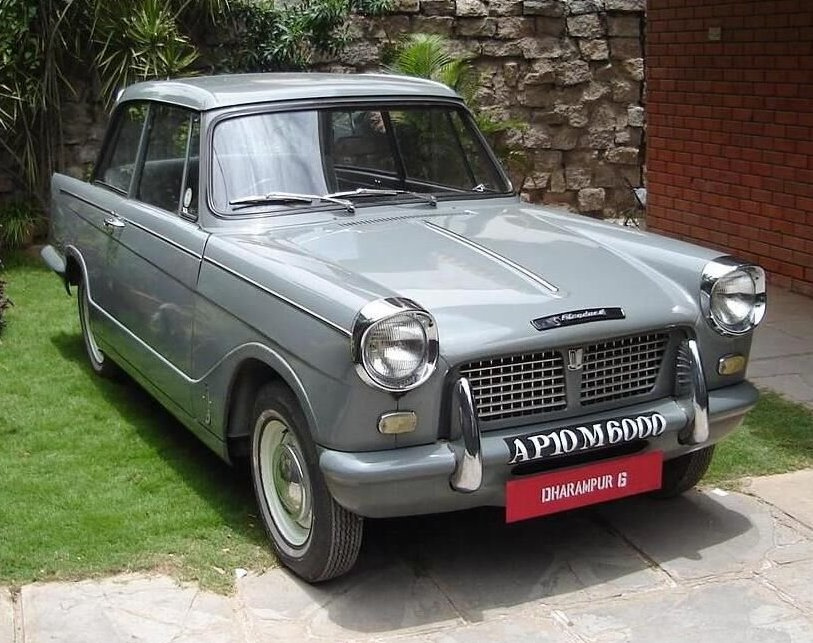
Standard Herald that had belonged to a descendant of the royal family of Dharampur State.

== Rulers ==
Rana Maharana Sahibs

- Oct 1680 - 1727 Sahadevji (died 1727)
- 1727 - 1758 Ramdevji II (died 1758)
- 1758 - 1774 Dharamdevji (died 1774)
- 1774 - 1777 Narandevji I (Guman Singh) (died 1777)
- 1774 - 1777 Maharani Baiji Kushal (died 1784) Kunverba (f) (1st time) -Regent
- 1777 - 1784 Somdevji II (Abhay Singh) (died 1784)
- 1777 - 1784 Maharani Baiji Kushal (s.a.) Kunverba (f) (2nd time) -Regent
- 1784 - 1807 Rupdevji (b. 1783 - d. 1807)
- 1784 - 1800 Maharani Baiji Kushal Kunverba (d. af.1808) Sahib (f) -Regent
- 1807 - 1857 Vijaidevji I (died 1857)
- 1857 - 20 Jan 1860 Ramdevji III Vijayadevji (died 1860)
- 20 Jan 1860 – 17 Sep 1891 Narandevji Ramdevji (b. 1840 - d. 1891)
- 1891 - 26 Mar 1921 Mohandevji Narandevji (b. 1863 - d. 1921)
- 26 Mar 1921 – 15 Aug 1947 Vijayadevji Mohandevji (b. 1884 - d. 1952)
- 1952 - Sahadevji Vijaidevji
- Present - Vacant
