= List of people from Mumbai =

Celebrity list

This is a list of notable residents of Mumbai, India. Residents may be known as Mumbaikars (in Marathi), or Bombayites.

== Sport ==
=== Cricketers ===
- Sachin Tendulkar
- Rohit Sharma
- Sunil Gavaskar
- Ajinkya Rahane
- Shreyas Iyer
- Ajit Agarkar
- Madhav Apte
- Pravin Amre
- Sairaj Bahutule
- Sameer Dighe
- Shivam Dube
- Farokh Engineer
- Subhash Gupte
- Wasim Jaffer
- Vinod Kambli
- Dhawal Kulkarni
- Smriti Mandhana
- Ashok Mankad
- Sanjay Manjrekar
- Vijay Manjrekar
- Vijay Merchant
- Sandeep Patil
- Dattu Phadkar
- Ramesh Powar
- Punam Raut
- Jemimah Rodrigues
- Richard Rutnagur
- Ravi Shastri
- Prithvi Shaw
- Eknath Solkar
- Leonard Stileman-Gibbard
- Shardul Thakur
- Polly Umrigar
- Dilip Vengsarkar
- Ajit Wadekar
- Thomas Wainwright
- Suryakumar Yadav
- Douglas Jardine
- Arthur Lang

=== Footballers ===
- Steven Dias
- Rahul Bheke
- Shilton D'Silva
- Ashutosh Mehta

=== Field hockey ===
- Yuvraj Valmiki

=== Kickboxing ===
- Sarah Avraham, Indian-born Israeli kickboxer, 2014 Women's World Thai-Boxing Champion

=== Motor racing ===
- Jehan Daruvala, Formula 2 racing driver

=== Running ===
- Raj Vadgama, ultramarathon runner

=== Snooker ===
- Aditya Mehta, World Games gold medallist

== Business ==
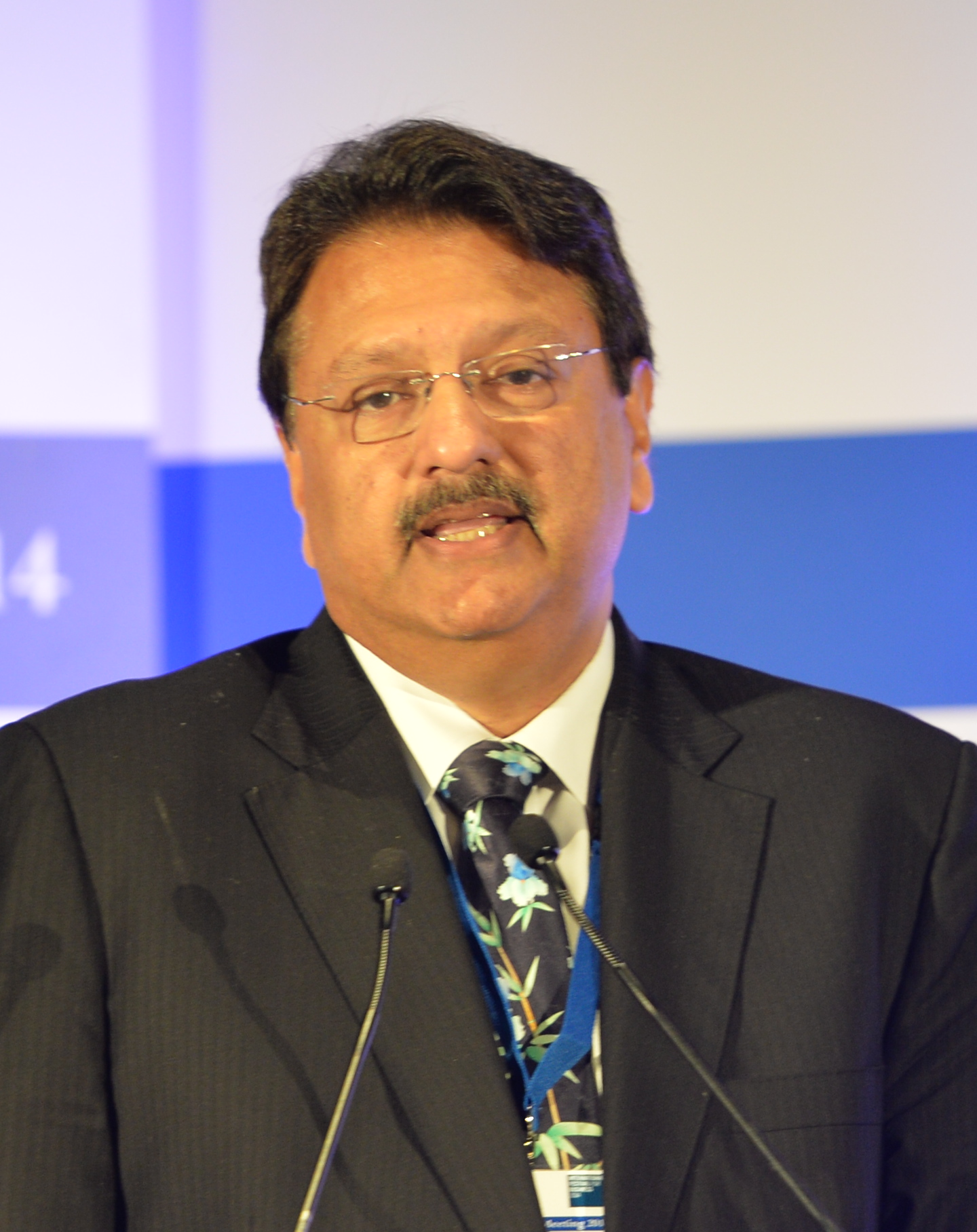
Ajay Piramal

- Anil Agarwal
- Anil Ambani
- Mukesh Ambani
- Nita Ambani
- Kumar Mangalam Birla
- Kishore Biyani
- Ghulam Bombaywala
- Radhakishan Damani
- Adi Godrej
- Sajjan Jindal
- Uday Kotak
- Vurjeevandas Madhowdas
- Anand Mahindra
- Deena Mehta
- Ajay Piramal
- Albert Abdullah David Sassoon
- David Sassoon
- Ronnie Screwvala
- Ratan Tata
- Nusli Wadia
- Sunit Khatau

== Film ==
=== Actors and directors ===
- Harshad Atkari
- Avinash Arun
- Sanjay Leela Bhansali, director
- Prarthana Behere
- Manju Bharti
- Reshma Bombaywala
- Ankush Chaudhari
- David Abraham Cheulkar
- Ravindra Dave
- Ramesh Deo
- Seema Deo
- Ritesh Deshmukh
- Varun Dhawan
- Madhuri Dixit
- Sanjay Dutt
- Waris Hussein
- Karan Johar
- Swapnil Joshi
- Bhalchandra Kadam, aka Bhau Kadam
- Urmila Kanitkar
- Jahangir Pestonji Khambhata
- Amruta Khanvilkar
- Rajeev Khinchi
- Sonali Kulkarni
- Sonalee Kulkarni
- Ashmith Kunder
- Dharmesh Vyas
- Dada Kondke
- Mahesh Kothare
- Mahesh Manjrekar
- Ishaa Koppikar
- Urmila Matondkar
- Winifred Mayo
- Amol Palekar
- Nana Patekar
- Ameesha Patel
- Sachin Pilgaonkar
- Dilip Prabhavalkar
- Nilesh Sable
- Ashok Saraf
- Shruti Seth
- Manoj Shah
- Namrata Shirodkar
- Shilpa Shirodkar
- Zenobia Shroff, Indian-American actress and comedian
- Amruta Subhash
- Shreyas Talpade
- Sai Tamhankar

== Music ==
=== Conductors ===
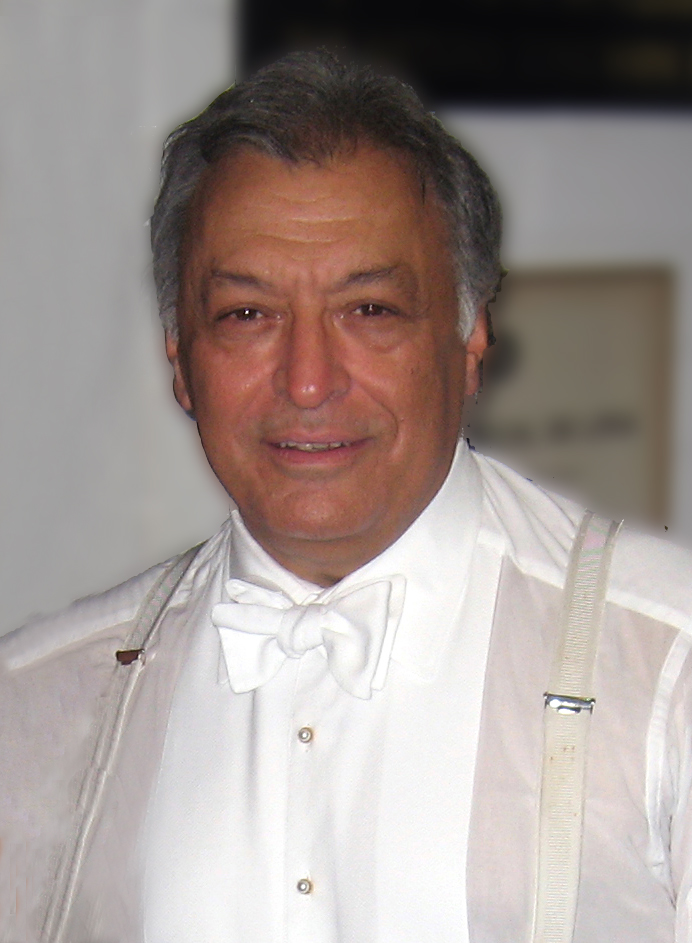
Zubin Mehta

- Zubin Mehta

=== Lyricists, musicians and singers ===
- Javed Akhtar
- Aarya Ambekar
- Asha Bhosle
- Rahul Dev Burman
- Ajay–Atul
- Naezy - rapper
- Savani Ravindra
- Rohit Raut
- Sadhana Sargam
- Geeta Dutt
- Lata Mangeshkar
- Usha Mangeshkar
- Freddie Mercury
- Mohammed Rafi
- Geetika Varde, classical singer
- Hridaynath Mangeshkar
- Rahul Vaidya
- Vaishali Samant
- Abhijeet Sawant
- Bela Shende
- Aditya Narayan
- Divine - rapper

== Writers and journalists ==
- Devyani Chaubal (1942–1995), film journalist and columnist of the 60s and 70s
- Firdaus Kanga
- B. K. Karanjia (1919–2012), film journalist and editor of Filmfare and Screen, chairman of NFDC
- Rudyard Kipling
- Rohinton Mistry
- Gregory David Roberts
- Salman Rushdie
- Melanie Silgardo (born 1956), poet
- Rishi Vohra
- Fareed Zakaria
- Taran Adarsh
- Mahinder Watsa
- Avabai Bomanji Wadia
- J. Clement Vaz
- Rohini Nilekani
- Seshadri Chari
- Vasudeo Sitaram Bendrey

== Others ==
- Uddhav Thackeray, ex-CM Maharashtra
- Urmila Asher, chef, influencer and business owner popularly known as "Gujju Ben"
- Aditya Thackeray, politician
- Sunil Dutt, politician
- Troy Costa (born 1975), fashion designer
- Kekoo Gandhy (1920–2012), art gallery owner, founded Gallery Chemould in 1963
- Chandrakala A. Hate, author, feminist, social worker, and professor
- Jamsetjee Jeejebhoy, merchant and philanthropist
- Muhammad Ali Jinnah, lawyer, politician, and the founder of Pakistan
- Abie Nathan, humanitarian and peace activist
- Shibani Dandekar, model, anchor and singer
- Reshma Bombaywala, model, actress and jewellery designer
- Reshma Qureshi, model and vlogger
- Cowasji Jehangir Readymoney, community leader, philanthropist and industrialist
- Sandra Samuel, nanny who saved the life of two-year-old Moshe Holtzberg during the November 2008 Mumbai terrorist attacks
- Vidya Chavan, politician, and the founder of Ghar Hakk Jagruti Parishad
- Ranvir Shah, cultural activist and philanthropist
- Jagannath Shankarshet, philanthropist and educationalist
- Rufus Pereira, Roman Catholic priest and exorcist
- Karan Singh (born 1991), Indian magician
- Tarun Tahiliani, fashion designer
- Zakir Naik, physician, Islamic preacher, founder of Islamic Research Foundation (IRF) and Peace TV
- Sameer Wankhede, Indian officer, worked with NCB
- Regan Gurung (born 1969), author, social psychologist and professor at Oregon State University
- Faheem Ansari, charged with involvement in the 2008 Mumbai attacks
- Edgar Anstey (psychologist)
- Urmila Balawant Apte, founder of the BhartiyaStree Shakti organisation
- Pravin Varaiya, professor
- Kamila Tyabji, lawyer
- Ashlesha Thakur, model
- Menaka Thakkar, dance, teacher
- Jagannath Shankarseth, educationist
- Aishwarya Sridhar, wild life photographer
- Matthew Spacie, rugby player
- Preeti Simoes, producer
- Harsh Vardhan Shringla, ambassador
- Ketaki Sheth, photographer and author
- Surabhi Sharma, filmmaker and educator
- Sheetal Sharma, fashion and costume designer
- Vipul D. Shah, TV producer
- Ashiesh Shah, architect and designer
- Afroz Shah, lawyer
- Leonard John Sedgwick, civil servant
- Anne-Marie Schwirtlich, Australian librarian
- Neela Satyanarayanan, author and civil servant
- Amla Ruia, social activist
- Abdul Rehman Shakir Patni, politician
- Devika Rotawan, survivor of the 2008 Mumbai attacks
- Judah Reuben, cricket umpire
- Ashish Rajadhyaksha, film scholar
- Rajesh Pullarwar, artist
- Bapsybanoo Pavry, socialite and aristocrat
- Sheela Patel, activist and academic involved with people living in slums and shanty towns
- J.B. Pardiwala, judge
- Aniruddha B. Pandit, inventor
- Marietta Pallis, ecologist
- Satyajit Padhye, puppeteer
- Morobhatt Dandekar, Hindu pandit
- Tarabai Modak, social worker
- Julião Menezes, freedom fighter
- Shankar Subbanarasayya Mantha, academic and administrator
- Akshay Laxman, stage magician and mentalist
- Bina Sheth Lashkari, doorstep school founder
- Johny Lal, cinematographer
- Pradeep Khosla, computer scientist
- Sanjyot Keer, internet personality
- Mumtaz M. Kazi, Indian train engineer
- Kunal Kamra, standup comedian
- Kamal Shedge, typographer
- Pravin Joshi, stage actor
- Rakesh Jhaveri, spiritual leader
- Jamsetjee Jejeebhoy Parsi merchant
- Kim Jagtiani, TV host
- Dinshah Irani, lawyer
- Princess India of Afghanistan, Afghan royal
- R. P. Goyal, banker
- Rachel Goenka, chef
- Natwar Gandhi, CFO
- Cecil Fforde, judge
- Munawar Faruqui, standup comedian
- Stig Engström (suspected murderer)
- Vikas Dilawari, conservation architect
- Keshav Desiraju, bureaucrat
- Monty Desai, cricket coach
- Vidya Dehejia, professor
- Percival David, financier
- Souvid Datta, photographer
- Dhunbai Cowasji Jehangir, philanthropist
- Carlos Cordeiro, sports executive
- Darryl Castelino, air force officer
- Bombae, performer
- Bhima of Mahikavati, king
- Jagdish Bhagwati, economist
- Syed Abdullah Barelvi, freedom fighter
- Damodar Bangera, freedom fighter
- Abhijit Banerjee, economist
- Rosalind Ballaster, scholar
- Kelyn Bacon, judge
- Teji Bachchan, social activist, wife of Hindi poet Harivansh Rai Bachchan and mother of Bollywood actor Amitabh Bachchan
- Garima Arora, first Indian woman to win a Michelin star
- Keya Wingfield, Indian American chef
- Zubin Mehta, conductor
- Usha Desai, environmentalist

== Academics ==
- Dolly Dastoor (born 1969), clinical psychologist and Zoroastrian leader
- Mahmood Mamdani (born 1946)
- Alexander George Ogston (1911–1996), biochemist, born in Mumbai
