= Association of Indian Universities =

Delhi-based Indian organization

- Logo of Association of Indian Universities
- Abbreviation: AIU
- Formation: 1925; 101 years ago as Inter-University Board (IUB)
- Headquarters: New Delhi, India
- Location: India
- President: Vinay Kumar Pathak
- Secretary General: Dr. Pankaj Mittal
- Website: www.aiu.ac.in

Association of Indian Universities (AIU) is an organisation of universities in India, including central universities, state universities, institutes of national importance, and deemed universities. It is based in Delhi. It evaluates the courses, syllabi, standards, and credits of foreign universities pursued abroad and equates them with various courses offered by Indian universities.

The AIU is mainly concerned with the recognition of Degrees/Diplomas awarded by the Universities in India, which are recognized by the UGC, New Delhi, and abroad for the purpose of admission to higher degree courses in Indian universities. The AIU is also an implementing agency for the agreements signed under the Cultural Exchange Programmes executed between India and other countries in the field of education, insofar as it relates to the recognition of foreign qualifications (except for medicine and allied courses).

It is a member of Board of Control for Cricket in India.

== AIU Games ==
AIU organizes National University Games and Special Coaching/advance Training camps for highly talented and selected athletes in collaboration with member universities, for participation of Indian Universities teams/contingent in National and International Sports Championships. At present, 206 sporting events are being organized on All India Basis and four zone basis for both men and women sections, sporting event are partially funded by the Ministry of Youth Affairs and Sports for promotion of competitive sports in university sector.

== Cricket ==
The Association of Indian Universities is a member of Board of Control for Cricket in India. The AIU is a Full Member of the BCCI, and on the same pedestal as other state and regional cricket associations. Being a Full Member, AIU also possesses voting rights in BCCI elections.

=== Competitions ===
==== Rohinton Baria Trophy ====
The Rohinton Baria Trophy is the premier inter-university cricket tournament in India. It has been contested since 1935–36.

==== Vizzy Trophy ====
The Vizzy Trophy is an annual inter-zonal university limited overs cricket tournament conducted by the AIU and named after former Indian cricketer and BCCI president, the Maharajkumar of Vizianagram. It is a List A tournament. The competition began in 1966–67 and was traditionally held during February. The BCCI and the AIU jointly organised it annually until 2011, when the BCCI ceased funding it. It has not been held since 2010–11. In February 2014, it was held in Mysuru. In 2019 BCCI allotted Cricket Association of Uttarakhand hosting rights for 2020 Vizzy trophy. 2023-24 Vizzy trophy scheduled to play in Raipur from 10 March 2023 to 12 March 2023, in RDCA Ground and Shaheed Veer Narayan Singh International Cricket Stadium in Raipur, Chhattisgarh.

== Members ==
During the year 2024-25, the following Universities/Institutes have been granted membership:

Sl. No.	University	Date of Membership
1	GSFC University	01.04.2024
2	Adani University	01.04.2024
3	Odisha University of Technology and Research	01.04.2024
4	JSPM University	01.04.2024
5	Durga Soren University	01.04.2024
6	Mahapurusha Srimanta Sankaradeva Vishwavidyalaya	01.04.2024
7	Sanskaram University	01.04.2024
8	National Law University of Meghalaya	01.04.2024
9	ST Aloysius (Deemed to be University)	01.04.2024
10	Sapthagiri NPS University	01.04.2024
11	The Apollo University	01.04.2024
12	Khongnangthaba University	01.04.2024
13	Atal Medical & Research University	01.04.2024
14	Techno India University	01.04.2024
15	K.M. (Krishna Mohan) University	01.04.2024
16	MIT Vishwaprayag University	01.04.2024
17	DRIEMS University	01.04.2024
18	Dr. Preeti Global University	01.04.2024
19	Vishvakarma Skills University	01.04.2024
20	Jai Minesh Adivasi University	01.04.2024
21	SDGI Global University	01.04.2024
22	Institute of Advanced Research	01.04.2024
23	IILM University	01.04.2024
24	FS University	01.04.2024
25	Amaltas University	01.04.2024
26	Flame University	01.04.2024
27	Sports University of Haryana	23.04.2024
28	Baba Amte Divyang University	30.04.2024
29	SKS International University	02.05.2024
30	Mind Power University	08.05.2024
31	Ramdeobaba University	07.06.2024
32	Maya Devi University	11.06.2024
33	DBS Global University	27.06.2024
34	National University of Study and Research In Law	04.07.2024
35	Sanjivani University	13.09.2024
36	Baba Mast Nath University	14.10.2024
37	Guru Nanak University	14.10.2024
38	MNR University	14.10.2024
39	Dr. Rajendra Prasad National Law University	05.11.2024
40	Ashoka University	18.11.2024
41	Shri Ramasamy Memorial (SRM) University	18.11.2024
42	Indira Gandhi Technological And Medical Sciences University	18.11.2024
43	Jaypee University	18.11.2024
44	CMJ University	18.11.2024
44	Shri Krishna AYUSH University	18.11.2024
46	Dharmashastra National Law University	18.11.2024
47	Spicer Adventist University	18.11.2024
48	Kamdhenu University	18.11.2024
49	D Y Patil University	18.11.2024
50	Bhattadev University	18.11.2024
51	Rabindranath Tagore University	18.11.2024
52	The Charutar Vidya Mandal (CVM) University	01.04.2025
53	Sri Konda Laxman Telangana Horticultural University	01.04.2025
54	NIST University	01.04.2025
55	Kaveri University	01.04.2025
56	Indian Institute of Information Technology Una	01.04.2025
57	NICMAR University of Construction Studies	01.04.2025
58	Anjaneya University	01.04.2025
59	JNCT Professional University	01.04.2025
60	Malla Reddy Vishwavidyapeeth	01.04.2025
61	Bhupal Nobles University	01.04.2025
62	Siddhartha Academy of Higher Education	01.04.2025
63	Sibsagar University	01.04.2025
64	Bihar Sports University	01.04.2025
65	Krantisurya Tantya Bhil University	01.04.2025
66	Bharti Vishwavidyalaya	01.04.2025
67	Indian Institute of Information Technology Agartala	01.04.2025
68	Madhav Institute of Technology & Science	01.04.2025
69	Sardar Vallabhbhai Global University	01.04.2025
70	Sreenidhi University	01.04.2025
71	Sona Devi University	01.04.2025
72	SRH University Heidelberg	01.04.2025
73	SRH Fernhochschule - The Distance Learning University	01.04.2025
74	South Asian University	01.04.2025
75	Dhanalakshmi Srinivasan University	01.04.2025
76	National Institute of Technology Delhi	01.04.2025
77	Chandigarh University	01.04.2025
78	Glocal University	03.04.2025
79	Aditya University	03.04.2025
80	Harcourt Butler Technical University	09.05.2025
81	Centurion University of Technology and Management	06.06.2025

== See also ==
- National Assessment and Accreditation Council
- National Institute of Open Schooling
- Department of Higher Education
- Medical Council of India
- Council of Architecture
