= Bangera =

Bangera (Marathi: बंगेरा) is a Marathi surname. Notable people with the surname include:

- Damodar Bangera (fl. 1940s), Indian freedom fighter
- Devaraj Bangera (fl. 2004–2009), Indian bishop
- K. Vasantha Bangera (1946–2024), Indian politician
