= Mantha =

Mantha may refer to:

== Places ==
- Mantha, Jalna, Maharashtra, India

== People ==
- Anthony Mantha (born 1994), Canadian ice hockey player
- Georges Mantha (1907–1990), Canadian ice hockey player
- Michael Mantha, Canadian politician in Ontario
- Moe Mantha, Sr. (1933–2015), Canadian ice hockey player and politician
- Moe Mantha, Jr. (born 1961), Canadian ice hockey player and coach
- Shankar Subbanarasayya Mantha (born 1954), Indian academic and administrator
- Sylvio Mantha (1902–1974), Canadian ice hockey player

== See also ==
- Manthai
