= MasterChef India – Hindi season 7 =

MasterChef India – Hindi
- Season 7
- Judges: Vikas Khanna; Ranveer Brar; Garima Arora
- No. of days: 65
- No. of contestants: 16
- Winner: Nayanjyoti Saikia
- Runner-up: Shanta Sarmah
- No. of episodes: 70

Release
- Original network: Sony Entertainment Television
- Original release: 2 January – 8 April 2023

Season chronology
- ← Previous; Season 6 Next → Season 8

Season 7 of the Indian Hindi-language competitive reality TV series MasterChef India – Hindi premiered on Sony Entertainment Television on 2 January 2023. The winner of this season was Nayanjyoti Saikia. The first runner-up was Santa Sarmah.The second runner-up was Suvarna Bagul.

Vikas Khanna and Ranveer Brar returned as one of the judges for the show while Vineet Bhatia was replaced by Garima Arora.

This season marked Khanna's sixth consecutive season serving as a judge on the show and Brar's third season. Similar to the past seasons, Amul remained the title sponsor of the show. The Masterchef India season 7 was announced on 14 August 2022 on Sony Entertainment Television channel and audition rounds were conducted in 4 cities across the country- Kolkata (24 September), Delhi (1 October), Hyderabad (8 October) and Mumbai (15 October). The shown ended with grand finale on 31 March 2023. The winner was Nayanjyoti Saikia, a student from Tinsukia, Assam and got the prize money of ₹25,00,000 while the first runner-up was Santa Sarmah, a homemaker from Guwahati and second runner-up was Suvarna Bagul, a homemaker from Mumbai, both got the prize money of ₹5,00,000.

Masterchef India-Masterclass- an extension of the show, featuring the same contestants and judges as 7th season but instead the judges will cook for the contestants, teaching them skills and recipes started on 2 April 2023 and ended on 8 April 2023.

== Top 16 ==
A large number of home cooks appeared at the nationwide auditions, of which 36 cooks were selected by MasterChef India judges and welcomed at the MasterChef Kitchen. They competed in a cook-off to win the final 16 spots. The top 16 contestants were revealed on 6 January 2023.

Contestant	Age	Hometown	Occupation	Status
Nayanjyoti Saikia	26	Tinsukia, Assam	Student	Winner; 31 March
Santa Sarmah	34	Nagaon, Assam	Homemaker	Runner-Up; 31 March
Suvarna Bagul	41	Mumbai, Maharashtra	Homemaker	Third; 31 March
Aruna Vijay	36	Chennai, Tamil Nadu	Digital Creator	Eliminated; 29 March
Kamaldeep Kaur	40	Ludhiana, Punjab	Homemaker	Eliminated; 28 March
Gurkirat Singh	24	Haryana	Lawyer	Eliminated; 28 March
Sachin Khatwani	22	Lucknow, Uttar Pradesh	Cloud Kitchen Owner	Eliminated; 17 March
Priyanka Biswas	32	Kolkata, West Bengal	Cake Artist	Eliminated; 10 March
Deepa Chauhan	52	Bangalore, Karnataka	Entrepreneur	Eliminated; 24 February
Nazia Sultana	33	Guwahati, Assam	Homemaker	Withdrew; 16 January; Returned; 30 January; Withdrew; 13 February
Priya Vijan	34	Bangalore, Karnataka	Nutritionist	Eliminated; 10 February
Avinash Patnaik	32	Bhubaneswar, Odisha	PhD Student-Horticulture, Food Consultant	Eliminated; 3 February
Vineet Yadav	23	Lucknow, Uttar Pradesh	Mehndi Artist	Eliminated; 27 January
Yashu Verma	19	Kolkata, West Bengal	Student	Eliminated; 20 January
Dyuti Banerjee	32	Kolkata, West Bengal	Professor, Lawyer	Eliminated; 20 January
Urmila Asher "Baa"	76	Mumbai, Maharashtra	YouTuber	Eliminated; 13 January

== Elimination Table ==
Place	Contestant	Episode																																																		
Place	Contestant	Week 2					Week 3				Week 4				Week 5				Week 6				Week 7				Week 8				Week 9				Week 10					Week 11				Week 12						Week 13		
Place	Contestant	6	7	8	9	10	11	12	13/14	15	16	17/18	19	20	21 (Note: Avinash and Suvarna were given the black aprons after the challenge due to being the weakest contestants.)	22	23	24/25	26	27/28	29	30	31/32	33	34	35	36	37	38/39	40	41	42	43/44	45	46	47	48	49	50	51	52/53	54	55	56		57	58	59	60	61/62	62/63	64/65
1	Nayanjyoti	WIN	IMM				WIN	IN	WIN	IMM	IN	LOW	WIN	IMM	IN	IN	WIN	IMM	IN	LOW	WIN	IMM	WIN	LOW	WIN	IN	WIN	IN	BTM	PT	TOP	IN	IN	TOP	IN	IN	WIN	IMM		IN	LOW	PT	IMM	IN	IN	IN	TOP	IN	TOP	PT	IN	WINNER
2	Santa	IN	IN	LOW	BTM	PT	WIN	IN	LOW	PT	IN	WIN	IMM		IN	IN	BTM	PT	IN	WIN	IMM		LOW	NOT	IN	IMM	LOW	TOP	WIN	IMM	TOP	IN	TOP	IN	IN	TOP	WIN	IMM		IN	WIN	PT	PT	IN	IN	IN	IN	WIN	IMM	IMM	TOP	RUNNER UP
3	Suvarna	IN	WIN	IMM			WIN	IN	LOW	PT	IN	LOW	BTM	PT	LOW	WIN	BTM (Note: Even though she won the previous challenge, Suvarna had to compete in this challenge and did not advance for next week because of previously having the black apron.)	PT	IN	LOW	BTM	PT	LOW	NOT	WIN	IN	LOW	IN	BTM	PT	IN	TOP	LOW	NOT	BTM	NOT			PT	IN	WIN	PT	PT	IN	IN	IN	IN	TOP	PT	PT	IN	THIRD
4	Aruna	IN	WIN	IMM			WIN	IMN	WIN	IMM	IN	WIN	IMM		TOP	IN	BTM	IMM (Note: Aruna used her previously won Immunity Pin to spare herself from the elimination challenge in this episode.)	WIN	IMM			LOW	NOT	WIN	IN	WIN	IN	WIN	IMM	IN	IN	IN	IN	IN	IN	WIN	IMM		IN	LOW	PT	PT	IN	IN	IN	IN	IN	PT	TOP	ELIM	
5	Kamaldeep	TOP	IN	LOW	WIN	IMM	WIN	IN	WIN	IMM	IN	LOW	BTM	PT	IN	IN	BTM	PT	WIN	IMM			LOW	NOT	WIN	IMN	LOW	IN	BTM	IMM	TOP	IN	IN	TICKET TO FINALE										IN	TOP	IN	IN	IN	PT	ELIM		
5	Gurkirat	IN	IN	LOW	WIN	IMM	WIN	IN	WIN	IMM	IN	WIN	IMM		WIN	IMM			IN	WIN	IMM		LOW	NOT	IN	IMM	WIN	IN	WIN	IMM	IN	IN	IN	IN	IN	IN	LOW	BTM	PT	TOP	LOW	PT	IMM	TOP	IN	BTM	NOT		PT	ELIM		
7	Sachin	IN	IN	LOW	BTM	PT	IN	NOT	LOW	PT	IN	LOW	BTM	PT	IN	IN	BTM	PT	IN	LOW	BTM	PT	WIN	LOW	IN	IMM	WIN	IN	BTM	PT	LOW	NOT			BTM	NOT			PT	IN	WIN	PT	ELIM									
8	Priyanka	IN	IN	LOW	BTM	PT	WIN	IN	LOW	PT	WIN	LOW	WIN	IMM	IN	IN	BTM	PT	IN	LOW	WIN	IMM	WIN	LOW	WIN	IN	LOW	BTM	NOT	PT	IN	IN	LOW	NOT	IN	IN	LOW	BTM	ELIM													
9	Deepa	IN	IN	WIN	IMM		IN	NOT	WIN	IMM	IN	WIN	IMM		IN	WIN	IMM		IN	WIN	IMM		LOW	NOT	IN	IMM	LOW	IN	BTM	ELIM																						
10	Nazia	WIN	IMM				WDR								IN	IN	BTM	PT	IN	LOW	BTM	PT	WDR																													
11	Priya	IN	IN	WIN	IMM		IN	NOT	LOW	NPT	WIN	WIN	IMM		IN	IN	BTM	PT	IN	LOW	BTM	ELIM																														
12	Avinash	IN	IN	WIN	IMM		IN	NOT	WIN	IMM	IN	WIN	IMM		LOW	IN	BTM	ELIM																																		
13	Vineet	IN	IN	LOW	BTM	PT	WIN	IN	WIN	IMM	IN	LOW	BTM	ELIM																																						
14	Yashu	IN	IN	LOW	BTM	PT	IN	NOT	LOW	ELIM																																										
14	Dyuti	IN	IN	WIN	IMM		IN	NOT	LOW	ELIM																																										
16	Baa	IN	IN	LOW	BTM	ELIM																					VIS																									

(WINNER) The cook won the competition.
(RUNNER-UPS) The cooks finished in the second and third place.
(WIN) The cook won the Mystery Box challenge, or any other individual / pair challenge.
(WIN) The cook was on the winning team in the Team Challenge and directly advanced to the next round.
(TOP) The cook was one of the top entries in the individual challenge.
(IMN) The cook won an Immunity Pin in a given challenge.
(IMM) The cook didn't participate in the challenge as he/she already advanced to the next week.
(IN) The cook wasn't selected as a top or bottom entry in an individual / pair challenge.
(PT) The cook competed in the Pressure Test in elimination round, and advanced.
(LOW) The cook was on the losing team in the Team Challenge.
(LOW) The cook was one of the bottom entries in an individual challenge.
(BTM) The cook was one of the bottom entries in an individual challenge and had to compete in the upcoming elimination challenge.
(NOT) This cook did not participate in the challenge(s) as he/she had won Ticket to Finale or was disqualified.
(WDR) The cook withdrew from the MasterChef Kitchen.
(ELIM) The cook was eliminated from the MasterChef Kitchen.
(VIS) The cook returned to MasterChef Kitchen as Visitor Appearance and participated in a challenge.

== Controversies ==
The season was marked by a series of controversies, including:

- The season first landed in controversy when home cook Aruna Vijay, who is a vegetarian, was allowed to cook paneer as a substitute for fish. Audience termed this move as biasedness and favoritism towards Aruna.
- Homecook Aruna Vijay's dish was selected in Top 3, wherein she had made "Appam Stew". Netizens alleged that it was a 'plain looking' dish and saw this as an act of biasedness and how it appeared as though the show was fixed.

== Episodes ==
No.	Title	Directed by	Original release date
1	"India Ka Swaad"	Neeraj Shetty	2 January 2023
2	"Home Cooks Ka Passion"	Neeraj Shetty	3 January 2023
3	"Dil Ki Awaaz"	Neeraj Shetty	4 January 2023
4	"Passion Se Pehchaan"	Neeraj Shetty	5 January 2023
5	"Hindustan Ke Haatho Ka Jaadu"	Neeraj Shetty	6 January 2023
6	"First Challenge For Top 16"	Neeraj Shetty	9 January 2023
7	"Taste, Innovation And Presentation"	Neeraj Shetty	10 January 2023
8	"A Cook's Kingdom"	Neeraj Shetty	11 January 2023
9	"The Iconic Mystery Box Challenge"	Neeraj Shetty	12 January 2023
10	"On Par With The Best"	Neeraj Shetty	13 January 2023
11	"Naya Hafta Naye Challenges"	Neeraj Shetty	16 January 2023
12	"MasterChef Ka Brahmastra"	Neeraj Shetty	17 January 2023
13	"First Team Service Challenge"	Neeraj Shetty	18 January 2023
14	"Essence Of Being A Chef"	Neeraj Shetty	19 January 2023
15	"Bouncing Back From Pressure"	Neeraj Shetty	20 January 2023
16	"Home Cooks Pohche Goa"	Neeraj Shetty	23 January 2023
17	"Team Challenge In Thalassa"	Neeraj Shetty	24 January 2023
18	"Preparing Meals Under High Pressure"	Neeraj Shetty	25 January 2023
19	"Republic Day Challenge"	Neeraj Shetty	26 January 2023
20	"Black Apron Challenge"	Neeraj Shetty	27 January 2023
21	"Bachpan Ki Yaadein"	Neeraj Shetty	30 January 2023
22	"Precision And Perfection"	Neeraj Shetty	31 January 2023
23	"Muhavaron Se Cooking"	Neeraj Shetty	1 February 2023
24	"French Meringue Challenge"	Neeraj Shetty	2 February 2023
25	"Ande Ka Funda"	Neeraj Shetty	3 February 2023
26	"Importance of Culinary Knowledge"	Neeraj Shetty	6 February 2023
27	"The Food Truck Challenge"	Neeraj Shetty	7 February 2023
28	"Chalti Ka Naam Gaadi"	Neeraj Shetty	8 February 2023
29	"Cooking By Ear"	Neeraj Shetty	9 February 2023
30	"Unexpected Swap"	Neeraj Shetty	10 February 2023
31	"Blind Relay Challenge"	Neeraj Shetty	13 February 2023
32	"Closer To The Immunity Pin"	Neeraj Shetty	14 February 2023
33	"Face Off Against A Professional"	Neeraj Shetty	15 February 2023
34	"Immunity Pin Jeetne Ka Dusra Mauka"	Neeraj Shetty	16 February 2023
35	"Destiny Of The Menu"	Neeraj Shetty	17 February 2023
36	"Going Organic"	Neeraj Shetty	20 February 2023
37	"75 Years of Taste of India"	Neeraj Shetty	21 February 2023
38	"A Sweet Surprise"	Neeraj Shetty	22 February 2023
39	"Cooking With Love"	Neeraj Shetty	23 February 2023
40	"Agni Pariksha Challenge"	Neeraj Shetty	24 February 2023
41	"Swad Aur Sehat Ka Balance"	Neeraj Shetty	27 February 2023
42	"Desi Twist Challenge"	Neeraj Shetty	28 February 2023
43	"Holi Special"	Neeraj Shetty	1 March 2023
44	"Flavours of festivity"	Neeraj Shetty	2 March 2023
45	"Ode to the millets of India"	Neeraj Shetty	3 March 2023
46	"A Treat of Arab Street"	Neeraj Shetty	6 March 2023
47	"Waqt ka Khel"	Neeraj Shetty	7 March 2023
48	"A Culinary Experience at the Ferrari World"	Neeraj Shetty	8 March 2023
49	"Pizza Showdown"	Neeraj Shetty	9 March 2023
50	"Skill of the Grill"	Neeraj Shetty	10 March 2023
51	"Liquid To Solid Challenge"	Neeraj Shetty	13 March 2023
52	"India Ki Rooh"	Neeraj Shetty	14 March 2023
53	"Honouring the Dabbawalas"	Neeraj Shetty	15 March 2023
54	"Triple Challenge"	Neeraj Shetty	16 March 2023
55	"Dessert Special Challenge"	Neeraj Shetty	17 March 2023
56	"Double Trouble for the Home Cooks"	Neeraj Shetty	20 March 2023
57	"Biryani Challenge"	Neeraj Shetty	21 March 2023
58	"Dahi Challenge"	Neeraj Shetty	22 March 2023
59	"The Last Mystery Box Challenge"	Neeraj Shetty	23 March 2023
60	"Barter Challenge"	Neeraj Shetty	24 March 2023
61	"100 Steps Challenge"	Neeraj Shetty	27 March 2023
62	"Reimagining the Street Foods of India"	Neeraj Shetty	28 March 2023
63	"The Cook Along Continues"	Neeraj Shetty	29 March 2023
64	"3 course meal challenge"	Neeraj Shetty	30 March 2023
65	"The Flavorful Finale"	Neeraj Shetty	31 March 2023
