= Gaa (restaurant) =

Indian restaurant in Bangkok

Restaurant information
- Established: 2017
- Owner: Garima Arora
- Head chef: Garima Arora
- Food type: Indian
- Rating: Michelin Guide
- Location: 46/1 Sukhumvit 53, Klong Tan Nuea, Wattana, 10110, Bangkok, Thailand
- Coordinates: 13°43′38″N 100°34′42″E
- Website: www.gaabkk.com

Gaa is a restaurant in Bangkok, Thailand, offering modern Indian cuisine with Thai influences. Founded in 2017 by Garima Arora, the restaurant holds two Michelin stars and is recognized among Asia's 50 Best Restaurants. The restaurant is housed in a restored 60-year-old Thai wooden house in the Sukhumvit district.

== History ==
Gaa opened in April 2017 under the leadership of Garima Arora, a Mumbai-born chef who trained at Le Cordon Bleu in Paris and worked in renowned kitchens including Noma in Copenhagen and Gaggan in Bangkok.

Gaa earned its first Michelin star in 2018 and a second in 2024, making Garima Arora the first Indian woman to achieve two Michelin stars. Arora also received the Michelin Guide Young Chef Award, and Gaa has consistently ranked among the region's best, including #16 in Asia's 50 Best Restaurants (2019), Asia's Best Female Chef (2019) by World's 50 Best Restaurants, #7 in Bangkok's Top 25 Restaurants (2023), and Tatler Best 20 Restaurants (2025).

== Cuisine ==
Gaa serves seasonal tasting menus that reinterpret Indian culinary traditions using modern techniques and locally sourced Thai ingredients. The menu incorporates methods such as fermentation, pickling, and tandoor cooking. Signature items include the Bombay sandwich with sea urchin and Kashmiri morel paniyaram, crab in macadamia milk curry, and tandoori durian with pickles and roti. Pairings include wine, champagne, and house-made non-alcoholic beverages, supported by a cellar of over 2,000 bottles.

== Architecture ==
Gaa occupies a traditional Thai wooden house that originated in Ayutthaya and was relocated and reconstructed in Bangkok using traditional Ruen Thai joinery techniques. This method allowed the structure to be disassembled and reassembled, preserving its heritage while adapting it for a modern dining experience.

The space retains characteristic Thai architectural elements such as undulating roof forms and curved ceilings, complemented by a striking string installation inspired by Sai Sin, the sacred white threads used in Thai rituals.
