= 2013 Women's Cricket World Cup =

2013 Women's World Cup
- Dates: 31 January – 17 February 2013
- Administrator: International Cricket Council
- Cricket format: Women's One-day International cricket
- Tournament format(s): Group stage and knockout
- Host: India
- Champions: Australia (6th title)
- Runners-up: West Indies
- Participants: 8
- Matches: 25
- Player of the series: (New Zealand) Suzie Bates
- Most runs: (New Zealand) Suzie Bates (407)
- Most wickets: (Australia) Megan Schutt (15)

The 2013 ICC Women's Cricket World Cup was the tenth Women's Cricket World Cup, hosted by India for the third time, and held from 31 January to 17 February 2013. India previously hosted the World Cup in 1978 and 1997. Australia won the tournament for the sixth time, beating West Indies by 114 runs in the final.

It also marked the 40th anniversary of the inaugural Women's Cricket World Cup.

== Qualification ==
Four teams, Australia, England, India and New Zealand, had already qualified for the tournament. They were joined by Sri Lanka, South Africa, Pakistan and West Indies through the 2011 Women's Cricket World Cup Qualifier in Bangladesh, which also doubled as a qualifying tournament for the 2012 ICC Women's World Twenty20.

== Venues ==
2013 Women's Cricket World Cup (India)

| Stadium | City | Note |
|---|---|---|
| Brabourne Stadium | Mumbai | Opening, Group A, Super Six & Final |
| Bandra Kurla Complex Ground | Mumbai | Group A & Super Six Matches |
| Middle Income Group Club Ground | Mumbai | Group A & Super Six Matches |
| Barabati Stadium | Cuttack | Group B & Super Six Matches |
| DRIEMS Cricket Stadium | Cuttack | Group B Matches |

== Results ==
=== Group stage ===
The eight qualifying teams were split into two groups for the group stage, with traditional rivals Australia and New Zealand drawn together in Group B alongside South Africa and Pakistan, while India and West Indies were drawn together in Group A along with England and Sri Lanka. The top three teams from each group progressed to the Super Six stage while the fourth team from each group advanced to the 7th-Place Play-off.

==== Group A ====
| Pos | Team | Pld | W | L | T | NR | Pts | NRR |
|---|---|---|---|---|---|---|---|---|
| 1 | England | 3 | 2 | 1 | 0 | 0 | 4 | 0.641 |
| 2 | Sri Lanka | 3 | 2 | 1 | 0 | 0 | 4 | −0.433 |
| 3 | West Indies | 3 | 1 | 2 | 0 | 0 | 2 | 0.276 |
| 4 | India | 3 | 1 | 2 | 0 | 0 | 2 | −0.433 |

Source: ESPNcricinfo

On the Final Matchday – Tuesday 5 February

- England, advanced as seed A1 from Group A to the Super Six with victory in their final Group A match over the West Indies. Sri Lanka advanced as seed A2 from Group A following their 138 run victory over India who were eliminated. As a result, Sri Lanka takes over India's seeding (A2).
- West Indies advanced as seed A3 despite their defeat to England due to their superior Net Run Rate over India.
- India was eliminated from the 2013 Women's Cricket World Cup.

31 January 2013
14:30 (D/N)
Scorecard

| India; 289/6 (50 overs) | v | West Indies; 179 (44.3 overs) |
| Thirush Kamini 100 (146); Deandra Dottin 3/32 (4 overs) | | Deandra Dottin 39 (16); Nagarajan Niranjana 3/52 (9 overs) |

India Women won by 110 runs
Brabourne Stadium, Mumbai
Umpires: Shaun George (RSA) and Mark Hawthorne (Ire)
Player of the match: Thirush Kamini (India)

- West Indies Women won the toss and elected to field
- Rasanara Parwin (Ind) made her WODI debut.

1 February 2013
09:00
Scorecard

| England; 238/8 (50 overs) | v | Sri Lanka; 244/9 (50 overs) |
| Jenny Gunn 53 (71); Chamani Seneviratne 2/35 (8 overs) | | Chamari Athapaththu 62 (72); Katherine Brunt 2/36 (10 overs) |

Sri Lanka Women won by 1 wicket
Brabourne Stadium, Mumbai
Umpires: Buddhi Pradhan (Nep) and Gregory Brathwaite (WI)
Player of the match: Eshani Kaushalya (Sri Lanka)

- Sri Lanka Women won the toss and elected to field
- Amy Jones (Eng) made her WODI debut.

3 February 2013
09:00
Scorecard

| England; 272/8 (50 overs) | v | India; 240/9 (50 overs) |
| Charlotte Edwards 109 (123); Jhulan Goswami 2/56 (10 overs) | | Harmanpreet Kaur 107* (109); Katherine Brunt 4/29 (9 overs) |

England Women won by 32 runs
Brabourne Stadium, Mumbai
Umpires: Shaun George (Rsa) and Sarika Prasad (Sin)
Player of the match: Charlotte Edwards (England)

- India Women won the toss and elected to field

3 February 2013
09:00
Scorecard

| West Indies; 368/8 (50 overs) | v | Sri Lanka; 159 (40 overs) |
| Stafanie Taylor 171 (137); Shashikala Siriwardene 2/58 (10 overs) | | Deepika Rasangika 28 (25; Shaquana Quintyne 3/32 (9 overs) |

West Indies Women won by 209 runs
Middle Income Group Club Ground, Mumbai
Umpires: Vineet Kulkarni (Ind) and Buddhi Pradhan (Nep)
Player of the match: Stafanie Taylor (West Indies)

- Sri Lanka Women won the toss and elected to field

5 February 2013
09:00
Scorecard

| West Indies; 101 (36.4 overs) | v | England; 103/4 (35 overs) |
| Kyshona Knight 33 (86); Anya Shrubsole 4/21 (8.4 overs) | | Danielle Wyatt 40 (80); Deandra Dottin 3/20 (5 overs) |

England Women won by 6 wickets
Bandra Kurla Complex Ground, Mumbai
Umpires: Vineet Kulkarni (Ind) and Sarika Prasad (Sin)
Player of the match: Anya Shrubsole (England)

- West Indies Women won the toss and elected to bat

5 February 2013
14:30 (D/N)
Scorecard

| Sri Lanka; 282/5 (50 overs) | v | India; 144 (42.2 overs) |
| Deepika Rasangika 84 (109); Jhulan Goswami 3/63 (10 overs) | | Reema Malhotra 38 (51); Chamani Seneviratne 2/10 (7.2 overs) |

Sri Lanka Women won by 138 runs
Brabourne Stadium, Mumbai
Umpires: Gregory Brathwaite (WI) and Mark Hawthorne (Ire)
Player of the match: Deepika Rasangika (Sri Lanka)

- Sri Lanka Women won the toss and elected to bat

==== Group B ====
| Pos | Team | Pld | W | L | T | NR | Pts | NRR |
|---|---|---|---|---|---|---|---|---|
| 1 | Australia | 3 | 3 | 0 | 0 | 0 | 6 | 1.099 |
| 2 | New Zealand | 3 | 2 | 1 | 0 | 0 | 4 | 1.430 |
| 3 | South Africa | 3 | 1 | 2 | 0 | 0 | 2 | −0.297 |
| 4 | Pakistan | 3 | 0 | 3 | 0 | 0 | 0 | −1.986 |

Source: ESPNcricinfo

On the Final Matchday – Tuesday 5 February

- Australia and New Zealand advanced as seeds B1 and B2 respectively having already secured qualification ahead of their final fixture with wins in both their opening two matches.
- South Africa advanced as seed B3 after their victory over Pakistan who subsequently have been eliminated from the 2013 Women's Cricket World Cup.

1 February 2013
09:00
Scorecard

| Australia; 175 (46.1 overs) | v | Pakistan; 84 (33.2 overs) |
| Rachael Haynes 39 (74); Sadia Yousuf 3/30 (9.1 overs) | | Bismah Maroof 43 (95); Sarah Coyte 3/20 (10 overs) |

Australia Women won by 91 runs
Barabati Stadium, Cuttack
Umpires: Kathy Cross (NZ) and Ruchira Palliyaguru (Sri)
Player of the match: Sarah Coyte (Australia)

- Australia Women won the toss and elected to bat
- Renee Chappell and Holly Ferling (Aus) both made their WODI debuts.

1 February 2013
09:00
Scorecard

| New Zealand; 321/5 (50 overs) | v | South Africa; 170 (41 overs) |
| Sophie Devine 145 (131); Marizanne Kapp 1/39 (8 overs) | | Susan Benade 37 (45); Sian Ruck 4/31 (10 overs) |

New Zealand Women won by 150 runs
DRIEMS Ground, Cuttack
Umpires: Ahsan Raza (Pak) and Ian Ramage (Sco)
Player of the match: Sophie Devine (New Zealand)

- South Africa Women won the toss and elected to field

3 February 2013
09:00
Scorecard

| Pakistan; 104 (41.2 overs) | v | New Zealand; 108/3 (29.4 overs) |
| Asmavia Iqbal 22(41); Rachel Candy 5/19 (10 overs) | | Suzie Bates 65* (84); Sana Mir 2/26 (7 overs) |

New Zealand Women won by 7 wickets
Barabati Stadium, Cuttack
Umpires: S. Ravi (Ind) and Shahul Hameed (Ina)
Player of the match: Rachel Candy (New Zealand)

- Pakistan Women won the toss and elected to bat

3 February 2013
09:00
Scorecard

| South Africa; 188/9 (50.0 Overs) | v | Australia; 190/7 (45.4 Overs) |
| Marizanne Kapp 61 (102); Ellyse Perry 3/35 (10 overs) | | Rachael Haynes 83 (108); Shabnim Ismail 4/41 (10 overs) |

Australia Women won by 3 Wickets
DRIEMS Ground, Cuttack
Umpires: Ahsan Raza (Pak) and Kathy Cross (NZ)
Player of the match: Rachael Haynes (Australia)

- South Africa Women won the toss and elected to bat

5 February 2013
09:00
Scorecard

| South Africa; 207/5 (50 overs) | v | Pakistan; 81 (29.4 overs) |
| Marizanne Kapp 102* (150); Qanita Jalil 2/30 (10 overs) | | Sidra Ameen 15 (36); Marizanne Kapp 3/18 (7 overs) |

South Africa Women won by 126 runs
Barabati Stadium, Cuttack
Umpires: Ruchira Palliyaguru (Sri) and Ian Ramage (Sco)
Player of the match: Marizanne Kapp (South Africa)

- South Africa Women won the toss and elected to bat
- Match start delayed due to fog

5 February 2013
09:00
Scorecard

| New Zealand; 227/6 (50 overs) | v | Australia; 228/3 (38.2 overs) |
| Suzie Bates 102 (134); Megan Schutt 3/40 (10 overs) | | Meg Lanning 112 (104); Lea Tahuhu 1/38 (10 overs) |

Australia Women won by 7 wickets
DRIEMS Ground, Cuttack
Umpires: S. Ravi (Ind) and Shahul Hameed (Ina)
Player of the match: Meg Lanning (Australia)

- Australia Women won the toss and elected to field
- Match start delayed due to fog

=== Super Six ===
The top three teams in each group moved on to the Super Six stage, which was scored as a complete round-robin. Each team played the three Super Six qualifiers from outside its group, whilst carrying forward its two results against the other Super Six teams which qualified from its group. The top two teams in the final table qualified for the final.

| Pos | Team | Pld | W | L | T | NR | Pts | NRR | Qualification |
|---|---|---|---|---|---|---|---|---|---|
| 1 | West Indies | 5 | 4 | 1 | 0 | 0 | 8 | 0.941 | Met in the Final |
| 2 | Australia | 5 | 4 | 1 | 0 | 0 | 8 | 0.714 | Met in the Final |
| 3 | England | 5 | 3 | 2 | 0 | 0 | 6 | 1.003 | Met in the 3rd place playoff |
| 4 | New Zealand | 5 | 2 | 3 | 0 | 0 | 4 | 0.694 | Met in the 3rd place playoff |
| 5 | South Africa | 5 | 1 | 4 | 0 | 0 | 2 | −1.131 | Met in the 5th place playoff |
| 6 | Sri Lanka | 5 | 1 | 4 | 0 | 0 | 2 | −2.477 | Met in the 5th place playoff |

Source: ESPNcricinfo

On the Final Matchday – Wednesday 13 February

- Sri Lanka lost to South Africa, losing their chance to make the 3rd place playoff.
- Australia lost to West Indies, who qualified for the final as a result of this game alongside Australia.

8 February 2013
09:00
Scorecard

| Australia; 147 (44.4 overs) | v | England; 145 (47.3 ov) |
| Sarah Coyte 44 (81); Anya Shrubsole 3/24 (10 overs) | | Lydia Greenway 49 (113); Holly Ferling 3/35 (10 overs) |

Australia Women won by 2 runs
Brabourne Stadium, Mumbai
Umpires: Ruchira Palliyaguru (Sri) and Sarika Prasad (Sin)
Player of the match: Lisa Sthalekar (Australia)

- England Women won the toss and elected to field

8 February 2013
09:00
Scorecard

| Sri Lanka; 103 (42 overs) | v | New Zealand; 108/2 (23 overs) |
| Dilani Manodara 34 (70); Lea Tahuhu 4/27 (10 overs) | | Frances Mackay 39* (64); Inoka Ranaweera 2/27 (5 overs) |

New Zealand Women won by 8 wickets
Bandra Kurla Complex Ground, Mumbai
Umpires: Shaun George (Rsa) and Buddhi Pradhan (Nep)
Player of the match: Lea Tahuhu (New Zealand)

- New Zealand Women won the toss and elected to field

8 February 2013
09:00
Scorecard

| South Africa; 230/7 (50 overs) | v | West Indies; 234/8 (45.3 overs) |
| Trisha Chetty 45 (74); Tremayne Smartt 2/43 (10 overs) | | Stafanie Taylor 75 (78); Dane van Niekerk 3/47 (9 overs) |

West Indies Women won by 2 wickets
Barabati Stadium, Cuttack
Umpires: Ahsan Raza (Pak) and Chettithody Shamsuddin (Ind)
Player of the match: Stafanie Taylor (West Indies)

- South Africa Women won the toss and elected to bat

10 February 2013
09:00
Scorecard

| Sri Lanka; 131 (45.2 overs) | v | Australia; 132/1 (22.2 overs) |
| Deepika Rasangika 43 (77); Erin Osborne 3/9 (10 overs) | | Rachael Haynes 71 * (61); Nagarajan Niranjana 1/21 (6 overs) |

Australia Women won by 9 wickets
Brabourne Stadium, Mumbai
Umpires: Kathy Cross (NZ) and Vineet Kulkarni (Ind)
Player of the match: Erin Osborne (Australia)

- Australia Women won the toss and elected to field

10 February 2013
09:00
Scorecard

| South Africa; 77 (29.3 overs) | v | England; 81/3 (9.3 overs) |
| Dane van Niekerk 17* (32); Anya Shrubsole 5/17 (10 overs) | | Arran Brindle 28* (16); Chloe Tryon 2/14 (3 overs) |

England Women won by 7 wickets
Barabati Stadium, Cuttack
Umpires: Ahsan Raza (Pak) and Mark Hawthorne (Ire)
Player of the match: Anya Shrubsole (England)

- England Women won the toss and elected to field

11 February 2013
09:00
Scorecard

| West Indies; 207/9 (50 overs) | v | New Zealand; 159 (44.3 overs) |
| Stafanie Taylor 49 (53); Morna Nielsen 3/27 (10 overs) | | Rachel Priest 36 (65); Tremayne Smartt 3/39 (9 overs) |

West Indies Women won by 48 runs
Brabourne Stadium, Mumbai
Umpires: Vineet Kulkarni (Ind) and Shahul Hameed (Ina)
Player of the match: Anisa Mohammed (West Indies)

- New Zealand Women won the toss and elected to field

13 February 2013
09:00
Scorecard

| West Indies; 164 (47 overs) | v | Australia; 156 (48.2 overs) |
| Deandra Dottin 60 (67); Holly Ferling 3/27 (7 overs) | | Alex Blackwell 45 (83); Shanel Daley 3/22 (9.2 overs) |

West Indies Women won by 8 runs
Middle Income Group Ground, Mumbai
Umpires: Kathy Cross (NZ) and Shaun George (Rsa)
Player of the match: Deandra Dottin (West Indies)

- West Indies Women won the toss and elected to bat

13 February 2013
09:00
Scorecard

| South Africa; 227/8 (50 overs) | v | Sri Lanka; 117 (36.4 overs) |
| Shandre Fritz 64 (71); Chamani Seneviratne 3/44 (10 overs) | | Chamari Athapaththu 63 (74); Dane van Niekerk 4/18 (7 overs) |

South Africa Women won by 110 runs
Barabati Stadium, Cuttack
Umpires: Gregory Brathwaite (WI) and Chettithody Shamsuddin (Ind)
Player of the match: Dane van Niekerk (South Africa)

- Sri Lanka Women won the toss and elected to field
- Elriesa Theunissen (SA) made her WODI debut.

13 February 2013
14:30 (D/N)
Scorecard

| England; 266/6 (50 overs) | v | New Zealand; 251/9 (50 overs) |
| Sarah Taylor 88 (79); Lucy Doolan 2/25 (6 overs) | | Amy Satterthwaite 103 (126); Holly Colvin 3/48 (10 overs) |

England Women won by 15 runs
Brabourne Stadium, Mumbai
Umpires: Vineet Kulkarni (Ind) and Buddhi Pradhan (Nep)
Player of the match: Sarah Taylor (England)

- England Women won the toss and elected to bat

=== Play-Offs ===
==== 3rd place playoff ====
15 February 2013
09:00
Scorecard

| New Zealand; 220/8 (50 overs) | v | England; 222/6 (47 overs) |
| Amy Satterthwaite 85 (95); Holly Colvin 3/31 (10 overs) | | Charlotte Edwards 106* (121); Lucy Doolan 3/50 (10 overs) |

England Women won by 4 wickets
Brabourne Stadium, Mumbai
Umpires: Shaun George (Rsa) and Vineet Kulkarni (Ind)
Player of the match: Charlotte Edwards (England)

- England Women won the toss and elected to field

==== 5th place playoff ====
15 February 2013
09:30
Scorecard

| Sri Lanka; 244/7 (50 overs) | v | South Africa; 156 (40.1 overs) |
| Chamari Athapaththu 52 (106); Marcia Letsoalo 2/36 (8 overs) | | Shandre Fritz 54 (74); Shashikala Siriwardene 4/32 (8.1 overs) |

Sri Lanka Women won by 88 runs
Barabati Stadium, Cuttack
Umpires: Gregory Brathwaite (WI) and Sarika Prasad (Sin)
Player of the match: Shashikala Siriwardene (Sri Lanka)

- Sri Lanka Women won the toss and elected to bat

==== 7th place playoff ====
7 February 2013
09:00
Scorecard

| Pakistan; 192/7 (50 overs) | v | India; 195/4 (46 overs) |
| Nida Dar 68* (83); Nagarajan Niranjana 3/35 (10 overs) | | Mithali Raj 103* (141); Qanita Jalil 1/19 (6 overs) |

India Women won by 6 wickets
Barabati Stadium, Cuttack
Umpires: Gregory Brathwaite (WI) and Ian Ramage (Sco)
Player of the match: Mithali Raj (India)

- Pakistan Women won the toss and elected to bat

=== Final ===
17 February 2013
14:30 (D/N)
Scorecard

| Australia; 259/7 (50 overs) | v | West Indies; 145 (43.1 overs) |
| Jess Cameron 75 (76); Shaquana Quintyne 3/27 (10 overs) | | Merissa Aguilleira 23 (36); Ellyse Perry 3/19 (10 overs) |

Australian Women won by 114 runs
Brabourne Stadium, Mumbai
Umpires: Shaun George (Rsa) and Vineet Kulkarni (Ind)
Player of the match: Jess Cameron (Australia)

- Australia Women won the toss and elected to bat

=== Final Positions ===
| Pos | Team | Record |
|---|---|---|
| 1st | Australia | 6–1 |
| 2nd | West Indies | 4–3 |
| 3rd | England | 5–2 |
| 4th | New Zealand | 3–4 |
| 5th | Sri Lanka | 3–4 |
| 6th | South Africa | 2–5 |
| 7th | India | 2–2 |
| 8th | Pakistan | 0–4 |

== Statistics ==
=== Most runs ===
| Pos | Name | Runs |
|---|---|---|
| 1st | (New Zealand) Suzie Bates | 407 |
| 2nd | (Cricket West Indies) Stafanie Taylor | 309 |
| 3rd | (England) Charlotte Edwards | 292 |
| 4th | (Australia) Rachael Haynes | 273 |
| 5th | (Sri Lanka) Deepika Rasangika | 236 |

=== Most wickets ===
| Pos | Name | Wickets |
|---|---|---|
| 1st | (Australia) Megan Schutt | 15 |
| 2nd | (England) Anya Shrubsole | 13 |
| 3rd | (New Zealand) Sian Ruck | 12 |
| 3rd | (England) Katherine Brunt | 12 |
| 5th | (England) Arran Brindle | 11 |

=== Team of the Tournament ===
On 18 February, the ICC announced the team of the tournament.

- (New Zealand) Suzie Bates (c)
- (England) Charlotte Edwards
- (Australia) Rachael Haynes
- (Cricket West Indies) Stafanie Taylor
- (Cricket West Indies) Deandra Dottin
- (Sri Lanka) Eshani Kaushalya
- (Australia) Jodie Fields (wk)
- (England) Katherine Brunt
- (England) Holly Colvin
- (England) Anya Shrubsole
- (Australia) Megan Schutt
- (Australia) Holly Ferling (12th)
