= Reshma Bombaywala =

Indian model and actress

- Occupation: Model
- Spouse: Dimitri Lezinska
- Modeling information
- Hair color: Brown
- Eye color: Black

Reshma Bombaywala is an Indian model, jewellery designer, and actress who won the Miss Beautiful Smile at Femina Miss India, and was the first runner-up in Gladrags in the year 1995. She is married to noted bartender and Discovery Channel's Cocktail Kings's host Dimitri Lezinska

== Modelling career ==
Reshma was spotted by noted choreographer, Sangeet Chopra. She has modelled for Wendell Rodricks, Hemant Trivedi, Shahab Durazi and Azeem Khan, and has appeared in several Hindi film and Indipop dance numbers. She modeled as an undergraduate at St. Xavier's College, Mumbai

== Personal life ==
Reshma is married to French-Caribbean mixologist Dimitri Lezinska and has two children.

== Filmography ==
Year	Title	Role
2001	Tum Bin	Dancer in the song "Thoda Daru Vich Pyaar Mila De"
2004	Garv: Pride & Honour	Dancer in the song "Marhaba Marhaba"
2025	War 2	Contractor

== Music videos ==
- 2001 : "Saun Di Jhadi" by Babbu Maan
- 2002 : "Koi Sehari Babu (Remix) - UMI 10 by Shaswati and Harry Anand
