= Bhupal Nobles University =

Private university in Udaipur, Rajasthan, India

- Type: Private
- Established: 2017
- Affiliations: UGC
- Chairperson: Col. S. S. Sarangdevot
- President: Dr. Chetan Singh Chauhan
- Location: Udaipur, Rajasthan, India; 24°34′45″N 73°43′06″E
- Website: www.bnuniversity.ac.in

Bhupal Nobles University, also known as BN University, is a private university located in Udaipur, Rajasthan, India. It was founded in 2017.

It is part of the Association of Indian Universities.
