= Garv: Pride & Honour =

2004 Indian film by Puneet Issar

- Theatrical release poster
- Directed by: Puneet Issar
- Screenplay by: Deepali Issar; Puneet Issar
- Story by: Puneet Issar
- Produced by: Prem Krishen; Sunil Mehta
- Starring: Salman Khan; Shilpa Shetty; Arbaaz Khan; Amrish Puri; Farida Jalal
- Cinematography: Kishore Kapadia; Stephen Fernandes
- Edited by: D. N. Malik
- Music by: Songs: Sajid–Wajid; Guest Composition: Anu Malik; Background Score: Aadesh Shrivastava
- Distributed by: Cinevistaas
- Release date: 9 July 2004
- Running time: 159 minutes
- Country: India
- Language: Hindi
- Budget: ₹17 crore
- Box office: ₹23.48 crore

Garv: Pride & Honour is a 2004 Indian Hindi-language action thriller film directed by Puneet Issar, in his directorial debut. The film stars Salman Khan, Shilpa Shetty, Arbaaz Khan and Amrish Puri. The film dealt with the Mumbai Underworld and politics in Maharashtra.

== Plot ==
ACP Arjun Ranawat appears before the court by the Mumbai Police amidst uproar by ruling party activists who keep raising slogans against him. Ranawat is charged with 18 mass killings at the Chief Minister’s farmhouse. In court, he confesses to all the crimes and requests nothing but an immediate death sentence. The narrative then shifts to a flashback of how Arjun got to where he was.

Arjun and his friend Hyder Ali Khan serve as ACPs in the Mumbai Police. Arjun and Hyder are embarrassed after notorious gangster-turned-pimp Hakim Lukka, who is charged with 38 criminal offences, is acquitted by the Magistrate due to Lukka's counsel, Advocate Kulkarni, producing fabricated evidence before the court. The following night, Lukka and Arjun accidentally meet again after Arjun's jeep breaks down in an isolated place. In the ensuing altercation, Lukka and his henchmen are killed by Arjun. Following this, Arjun is summoned for a departmental inquiry chaired by Commissioner Samar Singh, where he is interrogated by his superiors. Arjun defends his actions, claiming Lukka’s killing was in self-defense. Commissioner Samar reports to Chief Minister Satyanarayan Joshi and justifies Arjun's actions, arguing that encounter killings are necessary to achieve a crime-free state. CM Joshi, an upright and straightforward politician known for a strong stance on law and order in the state, approves Samar’s request, leading to the formation of the Crime Control Squad within the Mumbai Police, placing Arjun at its helm.

Led by Arjun and Hyder, the police begin eliminating gangsters and terrorists in Mumbai through encounter killings, facing criticism from human rights activists and opposition leader Kashinath "Kashi" Trivedi and his brother Badrinath Trivedi, who are influenced by underworld don Zafar Supari. In the subsequent meeting, CM Joshi and Commissioner Samar defend the practice of encounter killings, informing Kashi and his associates that these actions would continue until the last gangster in Mumbai is eliminated. During that same meeting, Arjun humiliates Kashi. A rattled Kashi warns Arjun that CM Joshi's days are numbered, and that he will remove the Commissioner once he consolidates power as the new Chief Minister. He further threatens that Arjun will be summoned to his office daily to salute him. As Arjun leaves the meeting, he is confronted by media personnel. Arjun and Hyder inform the media that the days of Zafar Supari and his henchmen are numbered.

Kashinath convinces Zafar Supari that he can poach 9 out of 11 independent MLAs supporting the ruling party if Zafar Supari promises to meet his expenses. Kashi eventually topples the Joshi-led government and becomes the Chief Minister with Zafar Supari’s help. Commissioner Samar Singh is immediately transferred to Gadchiroli, a Naxal-prone area on the Andhra-Maharashtra border. The newly appointed Commissioner, Yeshwant Deshpande, is corrupt and loyal only to CM Kashinath and his money. However, this does not stop Arjun and his fellow officers in the encounter squad from continuing their action against gangsters and terrorists. Arjun and Hyder eliminate Yeda, a henchman of Zafar Supari, who had intruded into Arjun’s home to intimidate his mother and sister. Following this, enraged CM Kashi commands Commissioner Deshpande to immediately disband the encounter squad and bring Arjun and his team under control. Deshpande informs Kashi that disbanding the Crime Control Squad and removing Arjun from its helm is not feasible due to oversight by the Central Home Ministry and the Director General of Maharashtra Police. However, he tells Kashi that he can manage the transfer of Hyder, who acts as the eyes and ears of Arjun. Hyder handles the entire spy network for the police and is the backbone of Arjun; thus, with Hyder gone, it will be difficult for Arjun to take forward the operations of the Crime Control Squad. Consequently, he attempts to transfer Hyder, telling him that he doubts Hyder's loyalty to the country by taking up religious issues. Feeling hurt, Hyder lashes out at Deshpande and storms out of his office, announcing his resignation. He removes his belt and insignia and throws them altogether, along with his service gun, at Deshpande's desk, thereby embarrassing Deshpande. But Arjun brings this to the attention of the Director General of Maharashtra Police and convinces him to reinstate Hyder in the squad.

Later, Deshpande advises Kashi to retrieve a file from Arjun that implicates corrupt politicians in collusion with Zafar Supari. The next day, Arjun is summoned to CM's office. He presents the file, which Kashi promptly burns. However, Arjun reveals that copies have already been sent to the Central Home Ministry, the President’s office, and the Prime Minister’s office. Enraged, Zafar Supari arrives in Mumbai and traps Hyder and his colleagues at the Old Jassai Railway Yard, using RDX to destroy the area. Hyder destroys the RDX and nearly kills Zafar Supari, but is fatally shot in the back by Inspector Avasthi, who has been bribed by Zafar Supari, Kashi and Deshpande. Zafar Supari brutally murders Hyder. Commissioner Deshpande falsely accuses Hyder of aiding the underworld as an ISI agent, presenting forged documents to the media to support this claim. During Hyder’s burial outside a mosque, Arjun receives a phone call from Zafar Supari, the contents of which remain unknown.

The narrative returns to the present-day courtroom. After the events involving Arjun, Samar Singh, who has a legal background, resigns from the police force to become Arjun’s lawyer. Justice Acharya is conducting the court proceedings. During the trial, Arjun’s colleagues in the police force unanimously testify in his and Hyder’s favor, collectively accusing Deshpande and Kashi of corruption and betrayal. Lawyer Tyagi accuses Arjun’s sister, Rakhi, of being absent from home on November 1 and engaging in inappropriate activities with corrupt politicians and their associates at the Chief Minister’s farmhouse. He further insinuates that she had illicit relations with her brother Arjun. Throughout the court proceedings, Arjun remains silent until he loses his composure and attacks Lawyer Tyagi. The court then warns Samar to counsel his client to exercise restraint. The judge cautions that if Arjun repeats such behavior, the court will be compelled to deliver a verdict without further hearings.

Samar then decides to introduce Rakhi in court, but gets to know that Arjun's killings have had a deep, mental effect on Rakhi and that she is currently being treated at Saint Mary's sanitarium. He goes there, and Rakhi tells him the truth of what transpired on 1 November. In court, Samar successfully demonstrates that both Chief Minister Kashi and Commissioner Deshpande fabricated reports against Arjun and Hyder. Consequently, the court orders the arrest of Kashi and Deshpande. Despite this, Samar emotionally appeals to the court to issue a death sentence for Arjun, as he cannot disclose the unfortunate reason behind Arjun’s actions. Unexpectedly, Rakhi steps forward and reveals the truth: on the night of November 1, she was kidnapped and gang-raped by the perpetrators, who include Badrinath, Zafar Supari, Avasthi, Kulkarni, Deshpande's son, and his men. Ferocious Arjun barges into the CM's farmhouse to save his sister and kills each and every one who molested her. To protect her dignity, he had chosen to remain silent all this time.

Following Rakhi’s testimony, Arjun is acquitted by the court. Additionally, the court charges CM Kashi and Commissioner Deshpande with treason. In the end, as Arjun exits the courthouse, he is honored with salutes from the Maharashtra Police, where he is expected to return and continue to discharge his duties.

== Cast ==
- Salman Khan as ACP Arjun Ranawat
- Arbaaz Khan as ACP Hyder Ali Khan, Arjun's friend
- Shilpa Shetty as Jannat
- Akanksha Malhotra as Rakhi Dixit, Arjun's foster sister.
- Amrish Puri as Police Commissioner / Advocate Samar Singh
- Farida Jalal as Shakuntala Devi, Arjun's foster mother
- Kulbhushan Kharbanda as Justice Acharya
- Anupam Kher as Advocate Tyagi, the prosecuting lawyer
- Mukesh Rishi as Zafar Supari, the main antagonist.
- Daman Maan as Inspector Avasthi
- Mohan Joshi as Advocate Kulkarni
- Shivaji Satam as Police Commissioner Yeshwant Deshpande
- Vijayendra Ghatge as Chief Minister Satyanarayan Joshi
- Govind Namdeo as Kashinath Trivedi
- Rajpal Yadav as 555 (Informer)
- Anant Jog as Badrinath Trivedi, Kashi ka chota bhai
- Vindu Dara Singh as Inspector J. Singh
- Sagar Salunkhe as Inspector N. Savarkar
- Nimai Bali as Pappu Kaalia, Zafar Supari's henchman
- Hemant Birje as Majid Khan, Zafar's brother
- Reshma Bombaywala as Dancer in the song "Marhaba Marhaba"
- Deepak Jethi as Hakeem Lukka

== Production ==
Sunny Deol was the initial choice for the role of ACP Arjun Ranawat, and Sanjay Dutt was considered for the role of ACP Hyder Ali Khan, but they were replaced by Salman Khan and Arbaaz Khan. The film was initially titled Sanghar, but was later changed to Garv: Pride & Honour.

== Soundtrack ==
Garv: Pride and Honour

Soundtrack album by Sajid–Wajid Anu Malik
- Released: 7 May 2004
- Genre: Feature film soundtrack
- Label: T-Series

The movie contains music composed by Sajid–Wajid with one track composed by Anu Malik.

#	Title	Singer(s)	Composer	Lyricist	Length
1	"Hum Tumko Nigahon Mein"	Udit Narayan, Shreya Ghoshal	Sajid–Wajid	Shabbir Ahmed	06:02
2	"Dum Mast Mast"	Sukhwinder Singh, Sunidhi Chauhan	Sajid–Wajid	Jalees Sherwani	05:38
3	"Soniye Toh Sonee"	Sukhwinder Singh, Shreya Ghoshal	Sajid–Wajid	Jalees Sherwani	05:05
4	"Marhaba"	Sunidhi Chauhan, Zubeen Garg	Anu Malik	Dev Kohli	07:05
5	"Chokari Patti Nahi Naukari Mili Nahi" (Khaaya Piya)	Sunidhi Chauhan, Vinod Rathod	Sajid–Wajid	Jalees Sherwani	05:48
6	"Saiyan Mora Saiyan"	Sunidhi Chauhan	Sajid–Wajid	Jalees Sherwani	05:57
7	"Hum Tumko Nigahon Mein II"	Sonu Nigam	Sajid–Wajid	Shabbir Ahmed	06:17
8	"Tere Hai Deewana Dil"	Kumar Sanu, Anuradha Paudwal	Sajid–Wajid	Jalees Sherwani	05:24

== Reception ==
Sukanya Verma of Rediff wrote, "There is nothing exceptional about Garv in terms of story or execution. You know exactly what to expect. It's a beaten-to-death plot about a righteous cop and his Satyamev Vijayate [Truth will triumph] stance. Like most do-gooder cops, here too the hero falls in love with a bar dancer (Shilpa Shetty in a role as skimpy as her wardrobe)." Manish Gajjar of BBC.com wrote "Technically Garv excels in various departments, whether it is the dialogues or the musical score. Both add impact to the scenes. I have said this before and I will say it again. Be warned about the blood and gore. Garv might not appeal to those who are used to seeing family orientated flicks. Garv is on the whole, Salman's film and he does full justice to his role. Shilpa Shetty does very well in the dance numbers whilst the rest of the cast support well.

In 2015, Issar told PTI in an interview that he thinks that "Garv was ahead of its times. For Salman, the movie had set a benchmark in terms of action sequences, drama and emotion. If it would have been released today then it would have definitely done business of Rs 300 crore."
