= Ramdeobaba University =

Indian university in Maharashtra

Coordinates: 21°10′36.2″N 79°03′43.3″E

- Former names: Ramdeobaba College of Engineering and Management (RCOEM)
- Motto in English: Engineering Education is Eminent
- Type: Private, co-educational university
- Established: 1984
- Founder: Banwarilal Purohit
- Accreditation: NAAC
- Affiliations: State Government of Maharashtra and UGC
- Chairman: Satyanarayan Nuwal
- Chancellor: Dr. Shankar S. Mantha
- Vice-Chancellor: Rajesh S. Pande
- Location: Nagpur, Maharashtra, India
- Campus: 17 acres (6.9 ha); Urban
- Website: Official website

Ramdeobaba University (RBU), previously Ramdeobaba College of Engineering and Management (RCOEM), is an Indian private university located in Nagpur, Maharashtra. It is recognized under the Maharashtra Private Universities (Establishment & Regulation) Act 2023 (Mah. Act No. VIII of 2024) by the Government of Maharashtra. The university holds ISO 9001:2015 certification and NAAC accreditation with an A+ grade. The campus covers 17 acres in Nagpur. It is approved by the UGC, New Delhi, and the Government of Maharashtra, and is accredited by the National Board of Accreditation (NBA). The university is also a center for research and Ph.D. programs.

== History ==
Established in 1984 as RCOEM by Ramdeobaba Sarvajanik Samiti trust, the institution was founded under the leadership of Banwarilal Purohit, former Governor of Punjab and Administrator of Chandigarh. The institution later saw leadership under Satyanarayan Nuwal, Chairman of Shri Ramdeobaba Sarvajanik Samiti, Nagpur, and Chairman and Non Executive Director, Solar Group, Nagpur. The university has received recognition for its NIRF ranking, NAAC grade, QS I-Gauge rating, campus awards, employability awards, and other accolades. The Chancellor and President of RB University is Dr S S Mantha, former Chairman of the All India Council of Technical Education (AICTE). Rajendra Purohit, General Secretary of Shri Ramdeobaba Sarvajanik Samiti (SRSS) and Director of The Hitavada, also serves as the institution's General Secretary.

== Schools of the Ramdeobaba University, Nagpur ==
- School of Computer Science and Engineering
- School of Electrical and Electronics Engineering
- School of Engineering Sciences: Mechanical Engineering
- School of Engineering Sciences: Civil Engineering
- School of Management
- School of Languages
- School of Humanities and Sciences
- School of Indian knowledge Systems
- School of Entrepreneurship, innovation and Incubation
- School of Vocational Education and Training

== Rankings ==
University and college rankings

Engineering – India
- NIRF (2024): 201-300

The National Institutional Ranking Framework (NIRF) ranked it 119 among engineering colleges in 2021, 146 in 2022. The NIRF ranked the university between 201-300 in the engineering rankings in 2024.

As per Forbes list of India’s 100 richest tycoons, dated October 09, 2024, Satyanarayan Nuwal & family is ranked 57th with a net worth of $5.5 Billion.

== Notable alumni ==
- Saiju Kurup, Malayalam cinema actor, has a cult following for his role as Arackal Abu in the 2015 comedy movie Aadu.
- Rajneesh Gurbani, Indian cricketer who plays for Vidarbha.
- Sandeep Karwa, Chief Executive Officer CEO Ajio
- Mahesh Krishnaswamy, CEO & Founder Taara Connect
- Manish Vyas, Director & CEO Prodapt , Ex President Tech Mahindra
- Vishal Agrawal, MD & Owner Plasto Tanks
