= Pie iron =

Cooking appliance

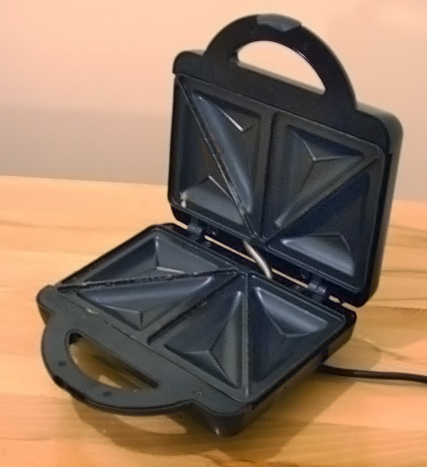
An open electric Bifinett sandwich toaster

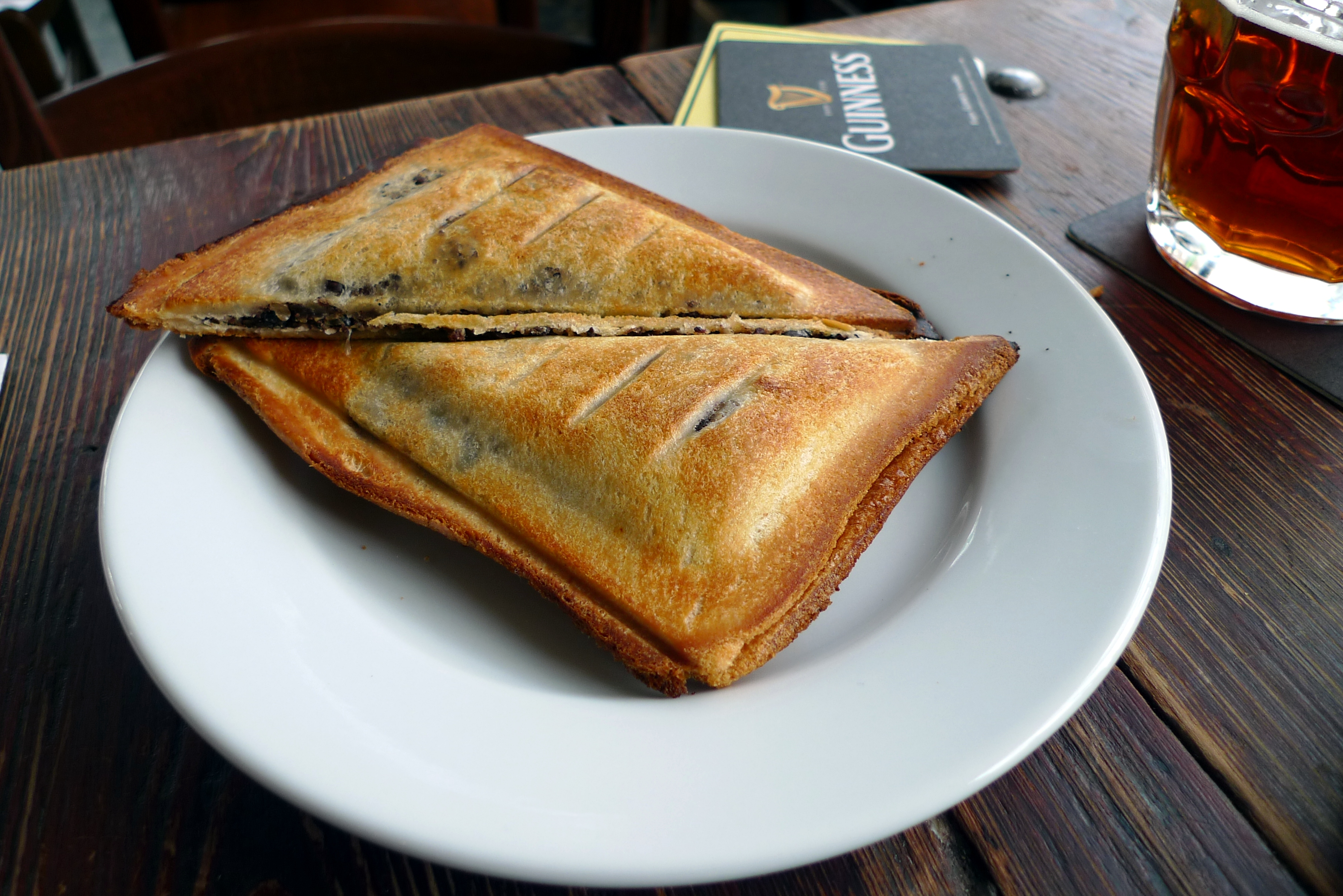
Haggis toastie sandwich

A pie iron, also called a pudgy pie iron, sandwich toaster, snackwicher, pie burner, toastie maker, sandwich maker, or panini grill, is a cooking appliance that consists of two hinged concave, round or square, cast iron or aluminium plates on long handles. Its "clamshell" design resembles that of a waffle iron, but lacks the chequered pattern. Pie irons are used to heat, toast and seal the sandwich.

== Origins ==
In the U.S., the Tostwich is possibly the earliest toasted sandwich maker, dating back to before 1920. However, it was not patented until 3 March 1925 (applied for on 26 May 1924). It was invented by Charles V. Champion, whose other inventions include a corn-popping machine for the mass production of popcorn.

== Operation ==
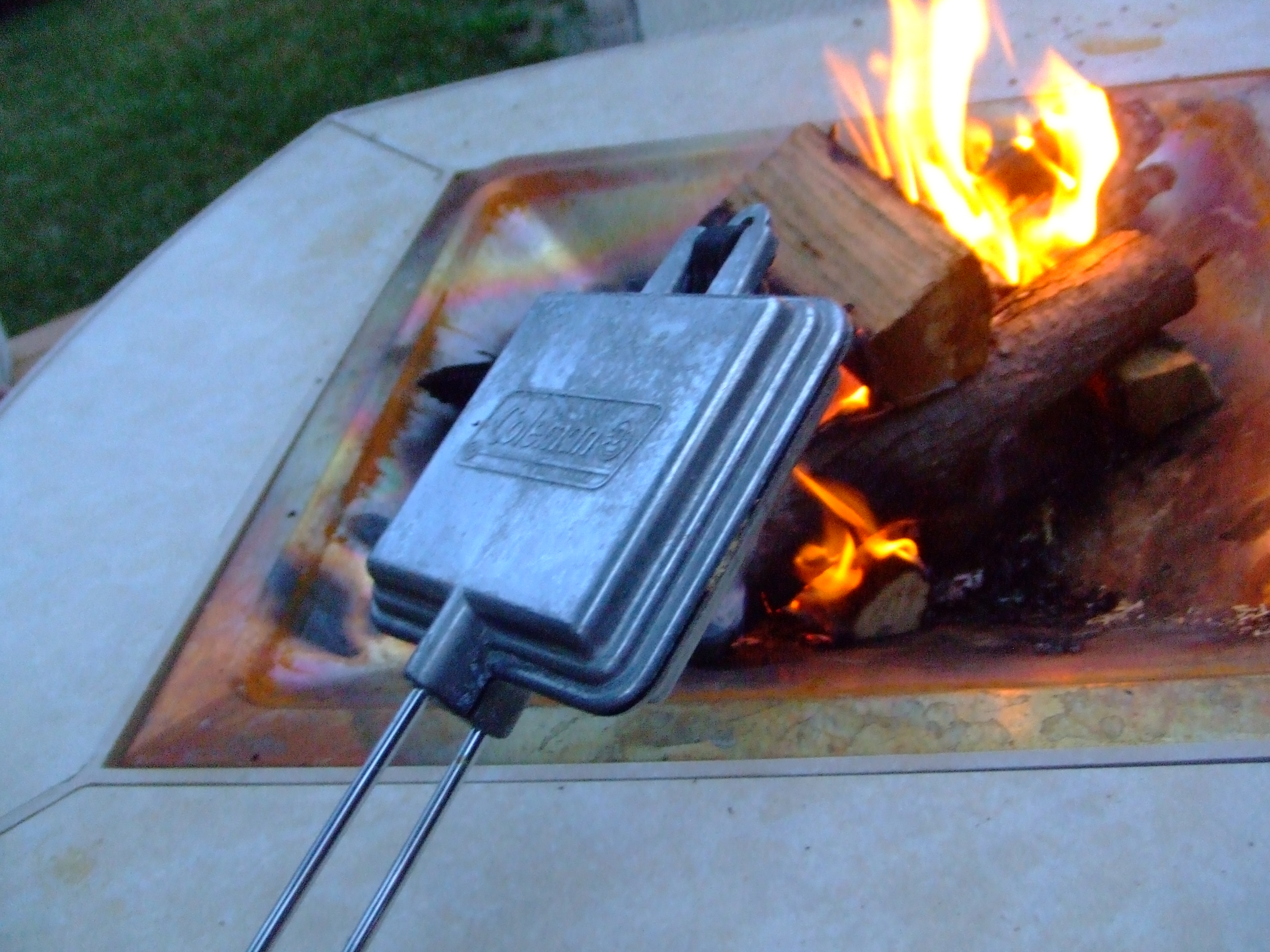
A pie iron over a campfire

Modern versions of the pie-iron are commonly more domestic, if not necessarily more refined, with subdivisions allowing pairs of bread slices to be clamped together around fillings to form pockets or stuffed sandwiches. A combination of heat and pressure seals the bread at the outer edges.

Campfire versions are still made of cast iron and can be cooked over coals, open flames, or a stove, but lightweight aluminium stove-top versions are made, generally being coated with a non-stick surface (PTFE) both as a cleaning aid and to allay fears regarding aluminium in the diet. Once the device is hot, the sandwich can be assembled "inside-out", where the buttered side of the bread faces outwards against the metal plates and the filling sits inside. This produces a crunchier sandwich and helps prevent the bread from sticking. Alternatively, bread can be placed inside unbuttered, which produces a chewier sandwich.

== Regional variants ==
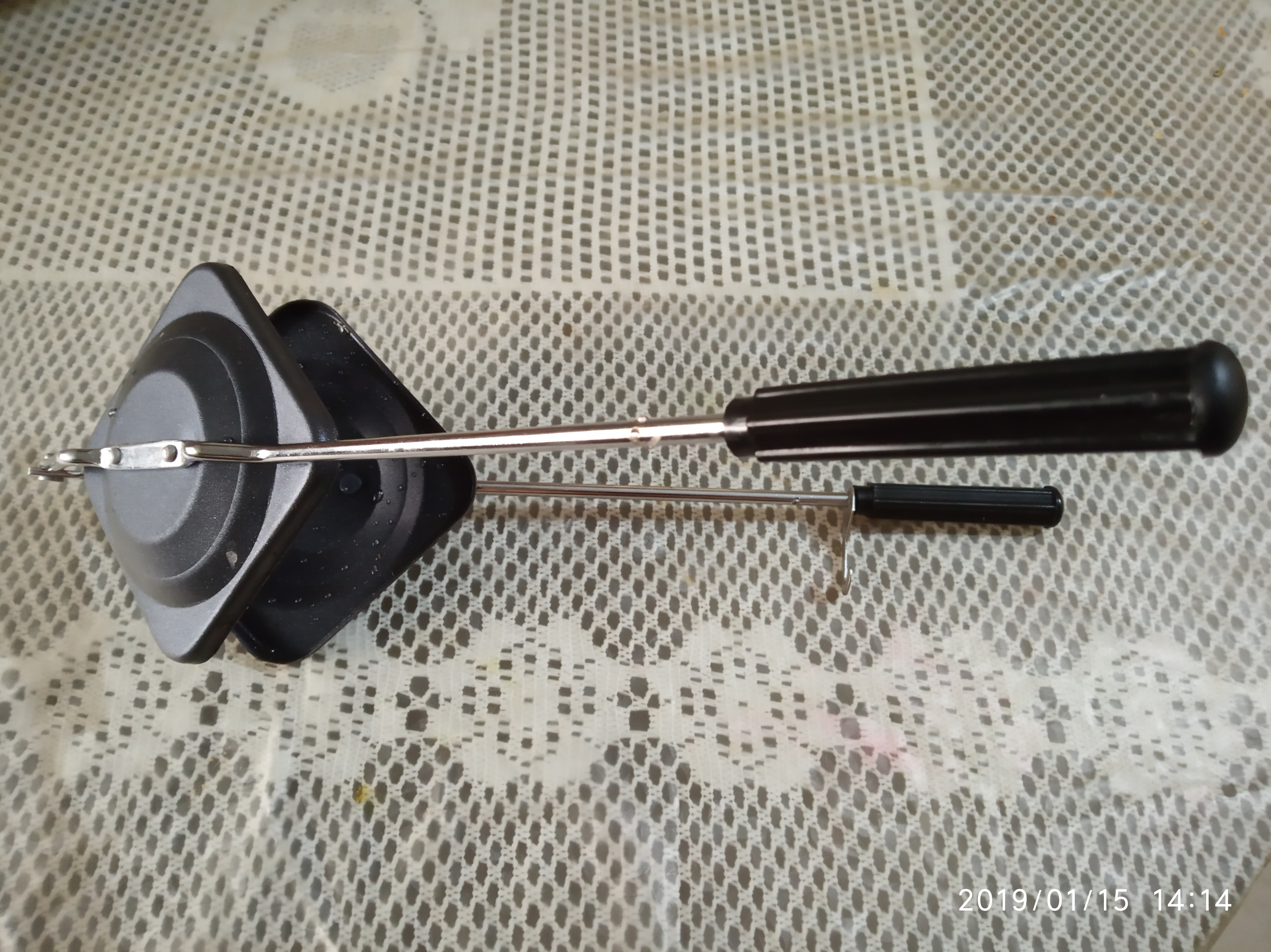
Indian open flame sandwich toaster

In 1949, in Australia, the original Jaffle-brand jaffle iron, to be heated over a fire, was designed and patented by Surfoplane inventor, Dr Ernest Eric Smithers, from Bondi, Australia. The original Jaffle-brand jaffle iron only sealed the sandwich around the edges, and did not cut it in half. This allowed more filling and or a whole egg. However, since the introduction of the Breville Snack'n'Sandwich Toaster in 1974, most electric jaffle makers in Australia split the sandwich in half.

In 1974, Cuisinart made an Australian electric jaffle iron. Rights acquired by John O'Brien for Australian cookware company Breville in the 1970s mean that the name Breville is sometimes used there eponymously to describe both the device and the toasted, sealed sandwich product.

In the UK, the appliance is notorious for being little-used. A survey in 2005 suggested that 45% of British adults own, but do not use, sandwich toasters.

In India, open flame toasters are used to toast sandwiches. They are often called "Bombay sandwiches" in Mumbai. A similar American utensil is trademarked "Toas-Tite".

== See also ==
- Griddle
- List of sandwiches
- Toast sandwich
- Toaster
- Waffle iron
