= Dhanalakshmi Srinivasan University =

Private university in Tiruchirappalli and Perambalur, India

- Type: Private
- Established: 2021
- Affiliations: AIU
- Chancellor: A. Srinivasan
- Vice-Chancellor: AM (Dr.) C. K. Ranjan, AVSM VSM (Retd.)
- Location: Tiruchirappalli and Perambalur, Tamil Nadu
- Website: www.dsuniversity.ac.in/index.php

Dhanalakshmi Srinivasan University is a private University founded in 2021. It is located in Tiruchirappalli and Perambalur, Tamil Nadu. It was established under the Tamil Nadu Private Universities Act, 2019.

Dhanalakshmi Srinivasan College of Arts and Science for Women (Perambalur), was ranked 44th among colleges in India by the National Institutional Ranking Framework (NIRF) in 2024.
