= Guru Nanak University =

- Type: Private University
- Established: 2024
- Chancellor: Gagandeep Singh Kohli
- Vice-Chancellor: Dr. Harvinder Singh Saini
- Location: Hyderabad, Telangana, India
- Website: Official website

Guru Nanak University is located in Hyderabad.It was established under the Telangana State Private Universities (Establishment and Regulation) act 11 of 2024.

It is part of the Association of Indian Universities.
