= Ketaki Sheth =

Indian photographer

- Born: 1957 (age 68–69); Mumbai, India
- Occupation: photographer
- Years active: 1980–present

Ketaki Sheth (born 1957) is an Indian photographer and author residing in Mumbai, India.

== Personal life and education ==
Born and brought up in Mumbai in 1957, Ketaki completed her undergraduate studies with a bachelor's degree in English literature.

== Awards ==
1992: Sanskriti Award for Indian photography.

1993: The Sanskriti Award for Indian Photography in New Delhi.

2006: Higashikawa Award in Japan.

2008: Solo Show (Bombay Mix)

== Books ==
- A Certain Grace: The Sidi, Indians of African Descent, PHOTOINK (1 January 2013), ISBN 978-9382846000
- Bombay Mix: Street Photographs, Dewi Lewis Publishing (4 October 2007), ISBN 978-1904587477
- Twinspotting: Photographs of Patel Twins in Britain and India, Dewi Lewis Publishing (10 April 2000), ISBN 978-1899235674
