= Akshay Laxman =

Indian stage magician and mentalist

- Born: 13 April 1990 (age 36); Vashi, Navi Mumbai, Maharashtra, India
- Education: Tilak College, Vashi
- Occupations: Magician; Mentalist
- Parent: 2

Akshay Laxman (born 13 April 1990), is an Indian stage magician and mentalist. Winner of an episode of the talent show Entertainment Ke Liye Kuch Bhi Karega on Sony Entertainment Television in the year 2014.

== Early life and education ==
Akshay was born in Navi Mumbai, India. He attended the Fr. Agnel School in Vashi and completed bachelor's degree in mass media and psychology from the Tilak College from Vashi.

== Career ==
Akshay was inspired by the illusionist David Copperfield at the age of five. He first performed in a stage show in 2003. He gained attention in 2011 after he performed magic shows in Carnival Cruise Line. Akshay's career got a breakthrough after performing in the India's Got Talent. Later, he performed a magic show for Aamir Khan and his family. Akshay is also known for appearing in shows such as Entertainment Ke Liye.

=== Television ===
Year	Title	Channel	Notes	Ref.
2008	Magic Hai Hindustani	Aaj Tak	Hidden Camera Prank Show	
2008	Hole In The Wall	Pogo	Magicians Special	
2013	Masterchef INDIA	Star Plus	Cameo	
2013	India’s Got Talent	Colors	Contestant	
2014	Entertainment Ke Liye Kuch Bhi Karega	Sony TV	Episode Winner	
2015 –2019	Big Celebrity Challenge	Zee Telugu	Guest Performer	
2019	Satyameva Jayate	ABP Majha	Guest Performer with Shah Rukh Khan	
2021	Dance Deewane	Colors	Guest Performer with Nora Fatehi	
