= Cocktail Kings =

British television program

- Starring: Colin Asare-Appiah; Dimitri Lezinska
- Country of origin: United Kingdom

Original release
- Network: Discovery Travel Channel

Cocktail Kings is a British television program on the Discovery Travel Channel hosted by Colin Asare-Appiah and Dimitri Lezinska. The program follows the two personalities in their journeys around Europe and the United States.

In a review for The Sydney Morning Herald, Scott Goodings wrote: "It's a globe-trotting European version of the '80s film Cocktail, with Col and Dimitri playing a sort of real-life Brian Flanagan and Doug Coughlin (Tom Cruise and Bryan Brown)."
