= Urmila Asher =

Indian chef and business owner

- Asher in 2025
- Born: October 23, 1946; Mumbai, India
- Died: 7 April 2025 (aged 78); Mumbai
- Occupations: Chef, small business owner
- Organizations: Gujju Ben Na Nasta

Urmila Jamnadas Asher (23 October 1946 – 7 April 2025), popularly known as Gujju Ben and Urmila Baa, was an Indian chef, influencer, and small business owner. She became known for her small business Gujju Ben Na Nasta, which sold pickles and homemade foods, and for her YouTube videos during and after the COVID-19 pandemic. She competed in MasterChef India – Hindi season 7, where she placed 16th but became known for competing at the age of 78. She was named to the Forbes 50 over 50: Global in 2025.

== Biography ==
Asher was born in Mumbai and got married at the age of 19. She had three children, but each died at a young age: her daughter died at 2, and both her older and younger sons also died. After her husband lost his job during the Great Bombay textile strike, she began to work as a chef at Gujarati homes in the area. Eventually, she also caught the attention of Gujarati expats in London, and went to several six-month-long trips to other locations to cook for these families.

During the COVID-19 pandemic, after her grandson had an accident, she decided to launch a business, Gujju Ben Na Nasta, selling the food she made. This soon led to her having a brick-and-mortar store, a commercial kitchen, and a brand that could be ordered from. She released her first YouTube video, "Meet Gujjuben, Entrepeneur turned YouTuber at 77" on December 10, 2021. Soon, she reached over 250 thousand subscribers through her videos teaching Gujarati recipes. Chef Garima Arora stated that when she cooks a traditional Gujarati dish, she looks to Gujju Ben Na Nasta (the channel) for guidance. She was featured in a collaboration with McDonald's India to unveil their new Jain-friendly menu.

She competed in MasterChef India – Hindi season 7, where she was one of sixteen contestants to pass the qualification round for the contest but ultimately placed sixteenth due to unfamiliarity with non-Gujarati foods. She was, however, invited by Indian President Droupadi Murmu to speak at the National Commission for Women in Delhi as a panelist.

She was featured in Forbes 50 over 50: Global in 2025.

Asher died on April 7, 2025.
