= Shankar Subbanarasayya Mantha =

Indian academic and administrator from Mumbai

S. S. Mantha
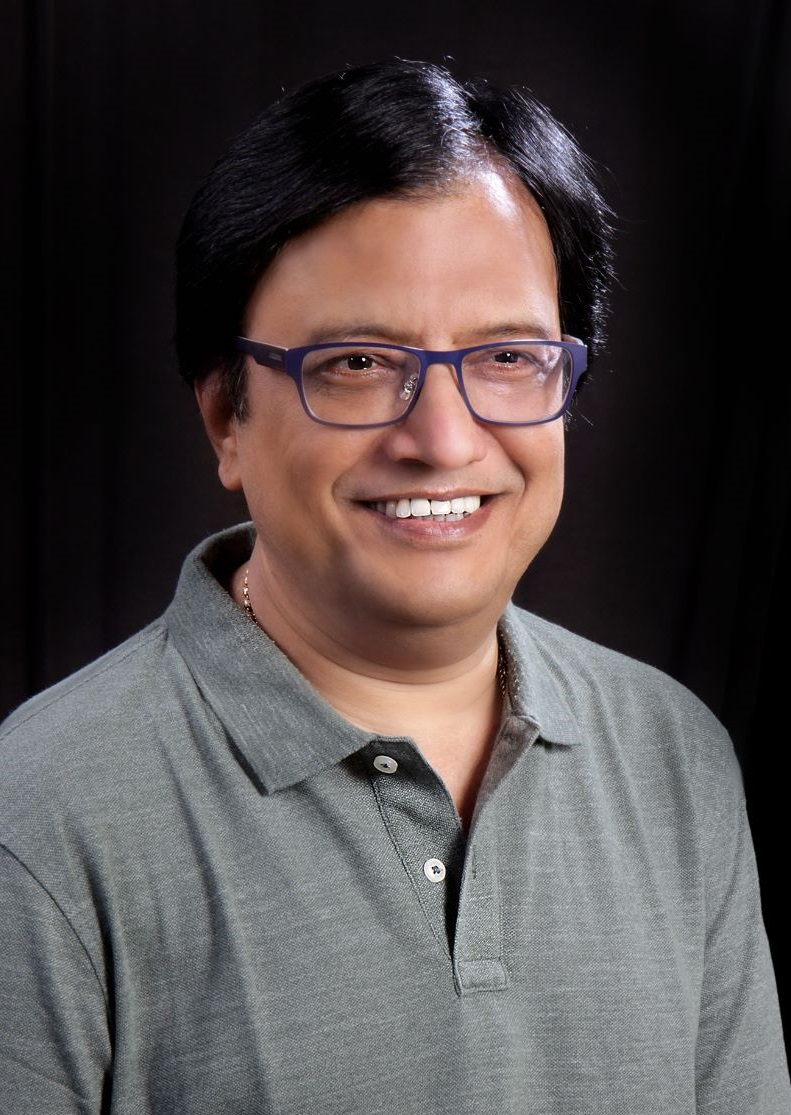
- Born: Shankar Subbanarasayya Mantha; Mumbai, Maharashtra, India
- Education: Maharaja Sayajirao University of Baroda (B.E.); Veermata Jijabai Technological Institute, University of Mumbai (M.E.); University of Mumbai (Ph.D.)
- Occupations: Academic, engineer, education administrator
- Title: Chancellor and President, RB University, Nagpur, and Adjunct Professor, National Institute of Advanced Studies, Bengaluru
- Awards: National Telecom Award (2011); SKOCH Award (2014); Lal Bahadur Shastri Exemplar Award (2021)
- Honours: Honorary Doctorate Degree, Doctor of Science (Honoris Causa)

Shankar Subbanarasayya Mantha (born in Mumbai, Maharashtra) is an Indian academic, engineer, and higher education administrator. He is the founding Chancellor and President of Ramdeobaba University (RBU), a private university in Nagpur established in 2024. Mantha previously served as Chairman of the All India Council for Technical Education (AICTE) (2009–2015) and held senior leadership roles at AICTE. He is an adjunct professor at the National Institute of Advanced Studies, Bangalore. His other roles include former president of the National Board of Accreditation, deputy vice-chancellor of SNDT Women's University in Mumbai, and chancellor of KL University. He has also led the MahaPreit Start-Up Knowledge Centre (MSKC), chaired the National Technical Committee on Cyber Safety and Security Standards, and worked as an accredited arbitrator with the Indian Institute of Arbitration and Mediation.

Mantha has received honorary Doctor of Science degrees from Visvesvaraya Technological University (2012), D. Y. Patil International University (2014), and Saveetha Institute of Medical and Technical Sciences (2025) in recognition of his contributions to technical education.

== Early life and education ==
Mantha was born in Mumbai, Maharashtra. He earned a Bachelor of Engineering in Mechanical Engineering from Maharaja Sayajirao University of Baroda and a Master's Degree in the same discipline from Veermata Jijabai Technological Institute (VJTI), then part of the University of Mumbai. He later completed a Ph.D. in combustion modeling from the University of Mumbai. His academic interests include Robotics, Artificial Intelligence, Control Theory, and Computational Modeling.

== Academic and professional career ==
=== Early academic work ===
Mantha began his career at VJTI, where he served for over two decades. As professor and later Head of the Department of Mechanical Engineering, he established laboratories in robotics and computer-aided design and manufacturing (CAD/CAM). In 2002, he received the Best Teacher Award from the Government of Maharashtra.

He subsequently served as Pro-Vice Chancellor of SNDT Women’s University, overseeing academic initiatives. Following his AICTE tenure, he returned to VJTI as Professor Emeritus.

=== Chairman of AICTE (2009–2015) ===
In 2009, Mantha was appointed Vice Chairman of AICTE, the national regulatory body for technical education in India. Following the suspension of the previous chairman, he assumed the role of Acting Chairman and was formally appointed Chairman in January 2012. He served in this capacity until January 2015.

His tenure saw the implementation of e-governance systems for transparency and accountability in institutional approvals. AICTE launched the National Vocational Education Qualification Framework (NVEQF) under his leadership, later integrated into the National Skills Qualification Framework (NSQF). He also presided over the introduction of the Common Management Admission Test (CMAT).

Mantha oversaw India becoming a permanent signatory to the Washington Accord in 2014, facilitating global recognition of Indian engineering degrees. His term coincided with legal challenges to AICTE's regulatory authority, which were resolved through court rulings clarifying its jurisdiction.

== Later career ==
After AICTE, Mantha served as Chancellor of KL University, focusing on quality and curriculum modernization. He was CEO of the MahaPreit Start-Up Knowledge Centre (MSKC), an initiative promoting public-sector entrepreneurship.

He chaired the National Technical Committee on Cyber Safety and Security Standards, developing guidelines for security in institutions. In 2023, he joined the advisory board of ed-tech company SpaceBasic. In 2024, Mantha was appointed founding Chancellor and President of Ramdeobaba University, Nagpur. He is overseeing its transition under the National Education Policy 2020, including multidisciplinary curriculum reforms.

== Publications and research ==
Mantha has authored over 280 academic papers in peer-reviewed journals and supervised multiple Ph.D. students. He has written more than 300 opinion articles in national publications addressing education reform, institutional autonomy, digital governance, and labor policy.

=== Selected books ===
- Object Oriented Programming in C++ (22 August 2009), ASIN B01M0E4HMN
- Aerodynamics of Cars: An Experimental Investigation - A Synergy of Wind Tunnel & CFD (30 December 2011), ASIN 3847324446
- Design and Development of Decelerometer (9 August 2012), ASIN 365921177X

=== Selected technical articles ===
- Design, modeling and simulation of a reconfigurable wheelchair with stand-sit-sleep facilities, 5th International Conference on Mechanics and Mechatronics Research (ICMMR 2018), doi:10.1088/1757-899X/417/1/012042
- Stability Analysis of Various Lengths Conical Hydrodynamic Bearing for Variable Load Conditions, International Conference on Advances in Thermal Systems, Materials and Design Engineering (ATSMDE2017), SSRN 3331447
- Orifice Compensated Performance Characteristics of Hybrid Hole-entry Conical Journal Bearing, Journal of Engineering Tribology, SAGE Journals
- Optimized Design of Feeding System for Complex Steel (CF8) Investment Casting to Improve Quality and Productivity, International Conference on Advances in Thermal Systems, Materials and Design Engineering (ATSMDE2017), SSRN 3101683
- Effect of Aspect Ratio and Semi Cone Angle on the Stability Behaviour of a Conical Hydrodynamic Journal Bearing, International Conference on Advances in Thermal Systems, Materials and Design Engineering, SSRN 3101365
- Effect of aspect ratio and semi cone angle on the stability behavior of a conical hydrodynamic Journal bearing, International Conference on Advances in Thermal Systems, Materials & Design Engineering (ATSMDE2017), SSRN 3101365
- Promoting quality of life of disabled people through comprehensive needs assessment study and QFD deployment targeted at evidence based wheelchair design, Springer Journals, Iranian Rehabilitation Journal
- Modelling human resource dimension of international project risk management, Journal of Global Operations and Strategic Sourcing
- Wear Influence on Performance of Conical Hydrodynamic Journal Bearing, Tribology in Industry
- Performance of conical hydrodynamic journal bearing under the worn-out condition, Industrial Lubrication and Tribology

== Awards and honors ==
- Best Teacher Award, Government of Maharashtra (2002)
- National Telecom Award for E-Governance in Education (2011)
- Lifetime Achievement Award, SOE Global Education Awards (2013–2014)
- SKOCH Award for e-Governance (2014)
- Senior Member, IEEE Robotics and Automation Society (2020)
- Lal Bahadur Shastri Exemplar Award, ReThink India Foundation (2021)

=== Honorary doctorates ===
- Visvesvaraya Technological University (2012)
- D. Y. Patil International University (2014)
- Saveetha Institute of Medical And Technical Sciences (2025)

== See also ==
- All India Council for Technical Education
- National Education Policy 2020
