= DRIEMS University =

Private Technical University in Odisha, India

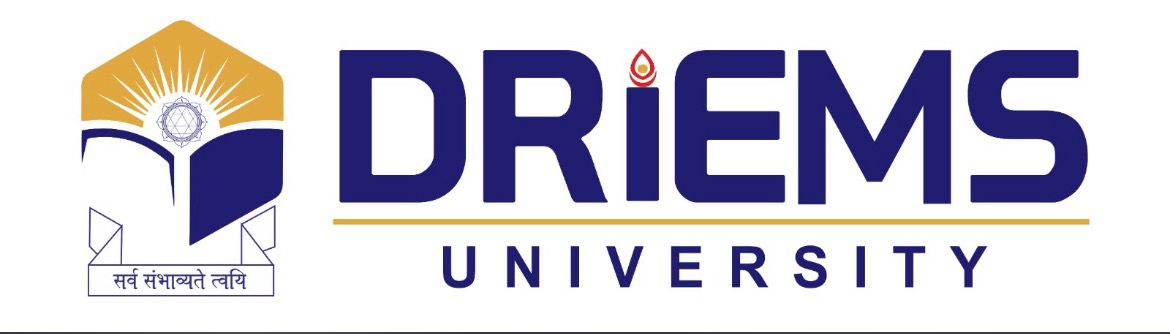
- Former names: Dhaneswar Rath Institute of Engineering and Management Studies
- Motto: सर्व संभाव्यते त्वयि
- Motto in English: Everything is Possible For You
- Type: Private
- Established: 1999
- Chairman: Dr. Pramod Chandra Rath
- Vice-Chancellor: Dr. Prakash Kumar Hota
- Students: 30000+
- Location: Tangi, Cuttack, 754022, Odisha, India; 20°33′10″N 86°0′1″E
- Campus: 150 acres
- Website: www.driems.ac.in

DRIEMS University, formerly Dhaneswar Rath Institute of Engineering and Management Studies (DRIEMS), is a state private university and group of technical and professional institutions located in Tangi, Cuttack district of Odisha, India.

== History ==
In 1999, DRIEMS University founded as Dhaneswar Rath Institute of Engineering and Management Studies (DRIEMS) by Dr. Pramod Chandra Rath in the memory of his father and social worker, philanthropist Dhaneshwar Rath in a rural area of Cuttack district.

It is situated on a sprawling 150 acre campus, DRIEMS now offers more than 50 courses across 12 disciplines, including Engineering, Medical Science, Paramedical, Nursing, Pharmacy, Management, and Polytechnic programs. During the Covid pandemic the DRIEMS Society started Padmini Care Multi-Specialty Hospital. Named after Late Padmini Rath (wife of Dr. Pramod Chandra Rath).

== Schools ==
- School of Engineering & Technology
- Institute of Health Sciences & Hospital
- School of Management
- School of Professional Studies
- School of Paramedical & Allied Science
- School of Nursing
- School of Hotel Management
- School of Fashion Design
- School of Occupational & Physiotherapy
- School of Pharmacy
- School of Humanities & Social Sciences
- School of Natural Sciences

=== DRIEMS Higher Secondary School ===
This school started as a Junior college in 2003 offering science education for grades 11th and 12th. The intake is 192 students per year, as of 2015. This college is affiliated to CHSE(O). The college consists of physics, chemistry, information technology and biology laboratories.

=== DRIEMS Polytechnic ===
The diploma school at DRIEMS provides a diploma in engineering in five streams. Started in 2003, the school has the capacity of 500 students per annum. It is affiliated to the SCTE&VT, Odisha The school provides the following streams:

- Computer Science
- Mechanical Engineering
- Electrical Engineering
- Electronics & Telecommunications
- Civil Engineering

== Affiliation ==
From 1999 to 2003 it was affiliated to Utkal University for its engineering & management programmes. From 2004 till it attained university status in 2023, it was affiliated to the Biju Patnaik University of Technology.

It is also part of the Association of Indian Universities.

== Recognition & Accreditation ==
It has been recognized with the highest ‘A’ grade by NAAC. It is an ISO 9001:2008 certified institution. Moreover, DRIEMS has earned the ISTE Best Engineering College award in 2018 and the Best Student Chapter award in 2019.
