= Taara (company) =

American telecommunications company

Taara Connect, Inc.
- Company type: Private
- Industry: Telecommunications technology; Free-space optical communications
- Predecessor: Project Taara (X Development LLC)
- Founded: 2025
- Founder: Mahesh Krishnaswamy
- Headquarters: Sunnyvale, California, U.S.
- Area served: Worldwide
- Key people: Mahesh Krishnaswamy (CEO)
- Products: Taara Lightbridge; Free-space optical terminals
- Owner: Alphabet Inc. (minority stake); Series X Capital; others
- Website: taaraconnect.com

Taara Connect, Inc. (doing business as Taara) is an American telecommunications technology company developing free-space optical communications (FSO) systems that use beams of light to deliver high-speed data links. The company spun out of X, Alphabet's Moonshot Factory, in March 2025 and is headquartered in Sunnyvale, California.

== History ==
Taara originated as a research project inside X (formerly Google X), where engineers explored alternatives to fiber deployment using optical links through the air. The company's formal spin-out was announced on 17 March 2025, backed by Series X Capital and with Alphabet retaining a minority stake in the new entity.

In its graduation statement, X described Taara's mission as "bringing high-speed, affordable and abundant connectivity to people everywhere using beams of light".

== Technology and products ==
Taara develops hardware and software for free-space optical connectivity in which narrow, invisible light beams carry data between two terminals without the use of fiber or radio spectrum. The company's flagship product, the Taara Lightbridge, is capable of delivering up to 20 Gbps over line-of-sight distances of up to 20 km.

Taara is also developing a silicon photonics-based beam-steering chip intended to miniaturize future terminals and reduce the mechanical complexity of current units.

== Deployments and use cases ==
Taara reports deployments in more than a dozen countries across Africa, India, North America, and Southeast Asia.

Notable deployments include:

- A link bridging the Congo River between Brazzaville and Kinshasa, where laying fiber is prohibitively expensive.
- Partnerships with Bharti Airtel, Vodafone, and T-Mobile for rural and metro backhaul.
- A reseller and distribution agreement with Digicomm International covering broadband, municipal, and enterprise network deployments across the Americas.

== Market and challenges ==
Taara positions its FSO links as an alternative where trenching fiber is difficult, costly, or blocked by terrain, regulation, or infrastructure barriers. The company has acknowledged that weather conditions, such as fog or heavy rain, can temporarily degrade links and that hybrid backup links are often used in deployments.

== Funding and ownership ==
Taara raised an undisclosed funding round coinciding with its spin-out in 2025, led by Series X Capital. Alphabet, via X Development LLC, retained a minority equity stake.

== See also ==
- LiFi
- Fiber-optic communication
