= Bombay sandwich =

Toasted sandwich

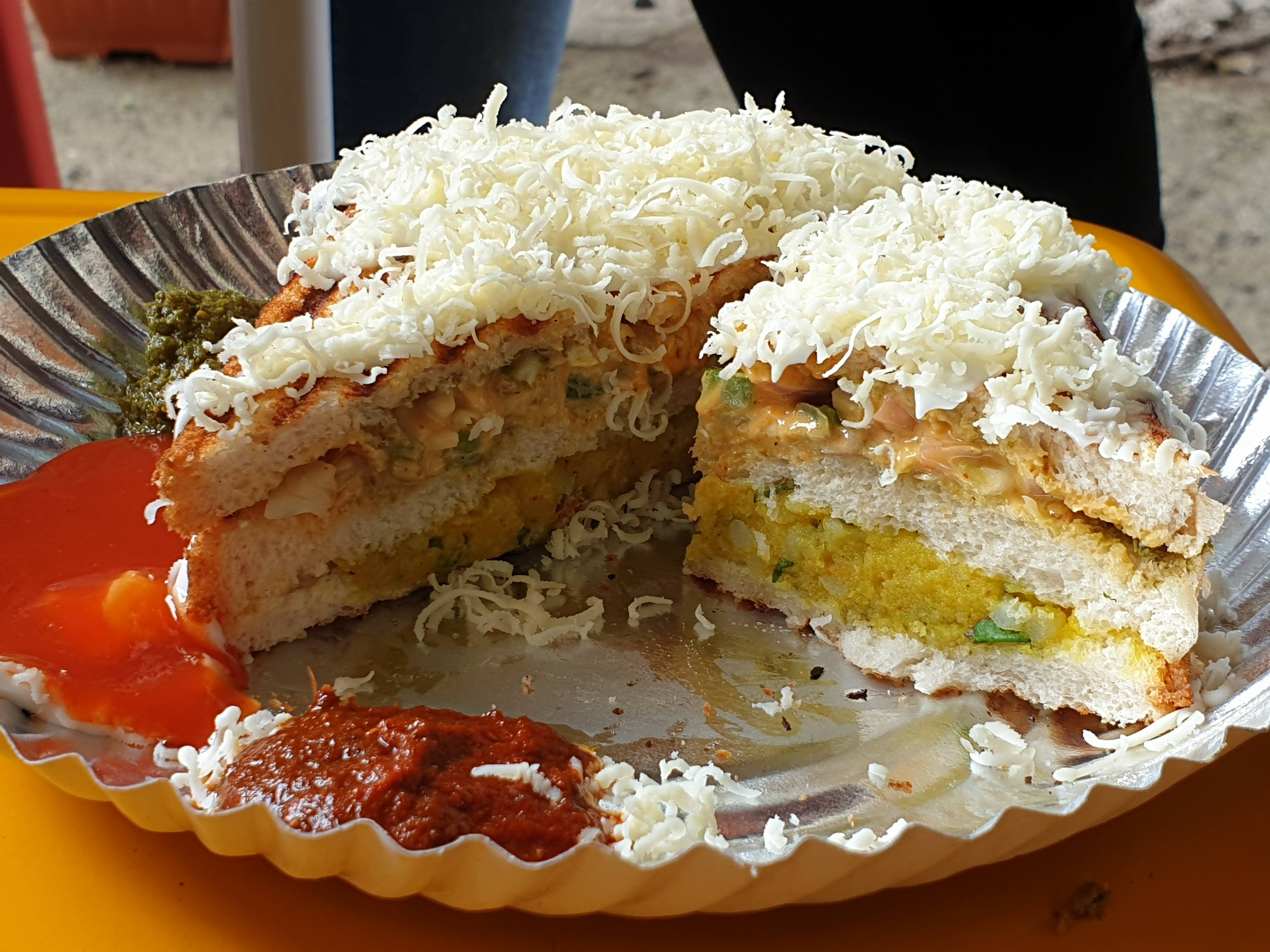
- Type: Sandwich
- Place of origin: Mumbai (Bombay)
- Invented: c. 1960s
- Serving temperature: Hot or cold
- Main ingredients: White bread, potato, green chutney
- Ingredients generally used: Beetroot, onion, capsicum, tomato, cheese, sev

The Bombay sandwich is a sandwich made of white bread covered in butter and chutney with a filling of potatoes and raw vegetables, often as a toasted sandwich. It may be toasted over a flame or using an electric toaster. Its ingredients may include cucumbers, onions, beetroot, and chaat masala, and it may be topped with cheese or sev. Many variations of ingredients exist. The origin of the Bombay sandwich is uncertain, but it may have been invented by migrant textile workers in the 1960s. The sandwich is popular as street food across Mumbai, but it is not as popular elsewhere.

== Preparation ==
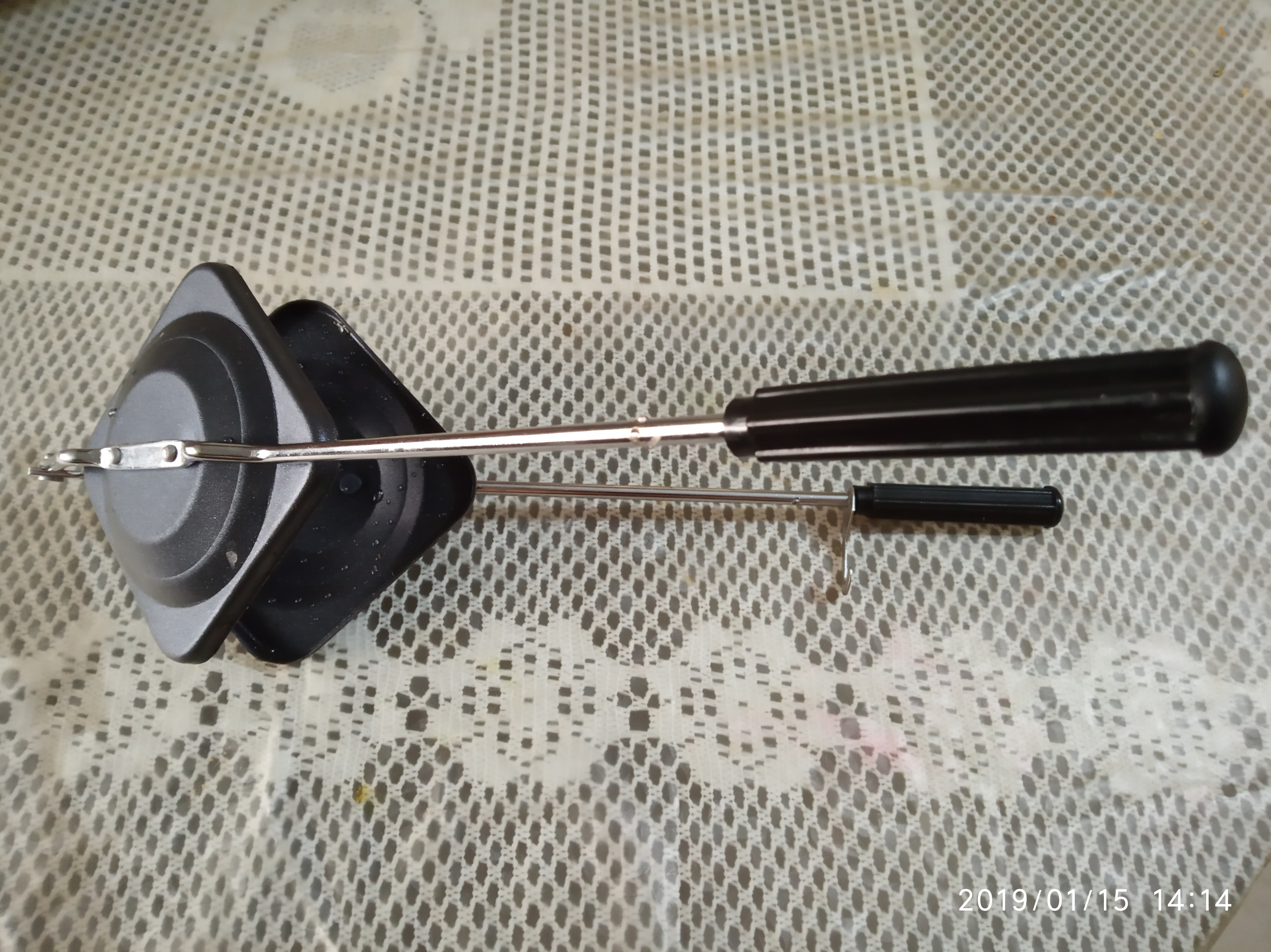
A chimta used to toast a sandwich over a flame

The Bombay sandwich is a vegetarian sandwich consisting of two or three slices of white bread with their crusts cut off, spread with butter and a green chutney, and filled with boiled potatoes and raw vegetables. The sandwich uses vegetables such as onion slices, cucumbers, tomatoes, capsicums, and beetroot, and it is seasoned with salt and chaat masala or mango powder, or with a proprietary blend of spices. The chutney is made with pudina and coriander leaf. The sandwich commonly uses Wibs brand bread, which is large and soft.

The sandwich is often toasted, traditionally done by holding it over a flame with a chimta, though some sandwich vendors, as well as restaurants, use electric sandwich toasters. This gives it a texture that is soft on the inside and crunchy on the outside. The large sandwich is cut into four or six slices. It is often topped with grated cheese, while some versions top it with crunchy sev. Street vendors serve the sandwich with ketchup on paper plates. It may be served hot or cold.

Many variations of the Bombay sandwich exist, with street vendors modifying the basic ingredients of the sandwich. The Bombay masala sandwich uses the spiced mashed potatoes used in masala dosa. A version of the sandwich uses paneer, while another uses potatoes and peas. Upscale versions of the Bombay sandwiches use ingredients such as imported cheese, sliced meat, avocado, or Schezwan chutney, while sweet versions use chocolate or Nutella. California-based chef Preeti Mistry has served a version made with Yukon gold potatoes, Chiogga beets, pickled onions, and Monterey Jack cheese. Chef Meera Sodha adapted the Bombay sandwich into a recipe called Bombay rolls, replacing the bread with puff pastry.

== History ==
The Bombay sandwich was invented in Mumbai—then called Bombay (Note: Although the city's official name has been changed to Mumbai, the dish is still known as the Bombay sandwich.)—following the introduction of the British sandwich during British colonial rule. Potatoes and bread had already been part of India's cuisine, introduced by Portuguese colonists. The vegetables used in Bombay sandwiches and the herbs in the chutney had come to Mumbai from other parts of India.

The Bombay sandwich is a recent invention relative to other street foods in Mumbai, though it is not known exactly when it was invented. Food writer Kunal Vijaykar and cookbook writer Sonal Ved both believe that the dish may have been invented in the 1960s by migrant workers during the boom in the city's textile industry, as they required a cheap and accessible food. According to Vijaykar, the original version of the Bombay sandwich was not toasted, and it was often served with pumpkin ketchup rather than tomato ketchup as it was cheaper. Cheese was added once the sandwich began being served toasted. According to Perzen Patel of The Spinoff, early vendors of the dish set up small tables, while later vendors had more permanent locations.

The Bombay sandwich was popular in the 1980s and 1990s. Food writer Vir Sanghvi states that it was the first Indian sandwich to achieve popularity and that its reliance on mass-produced ingredients is similar to other Mumbai street foods that became popular around this time, such as vada pav.

== Consumption ==
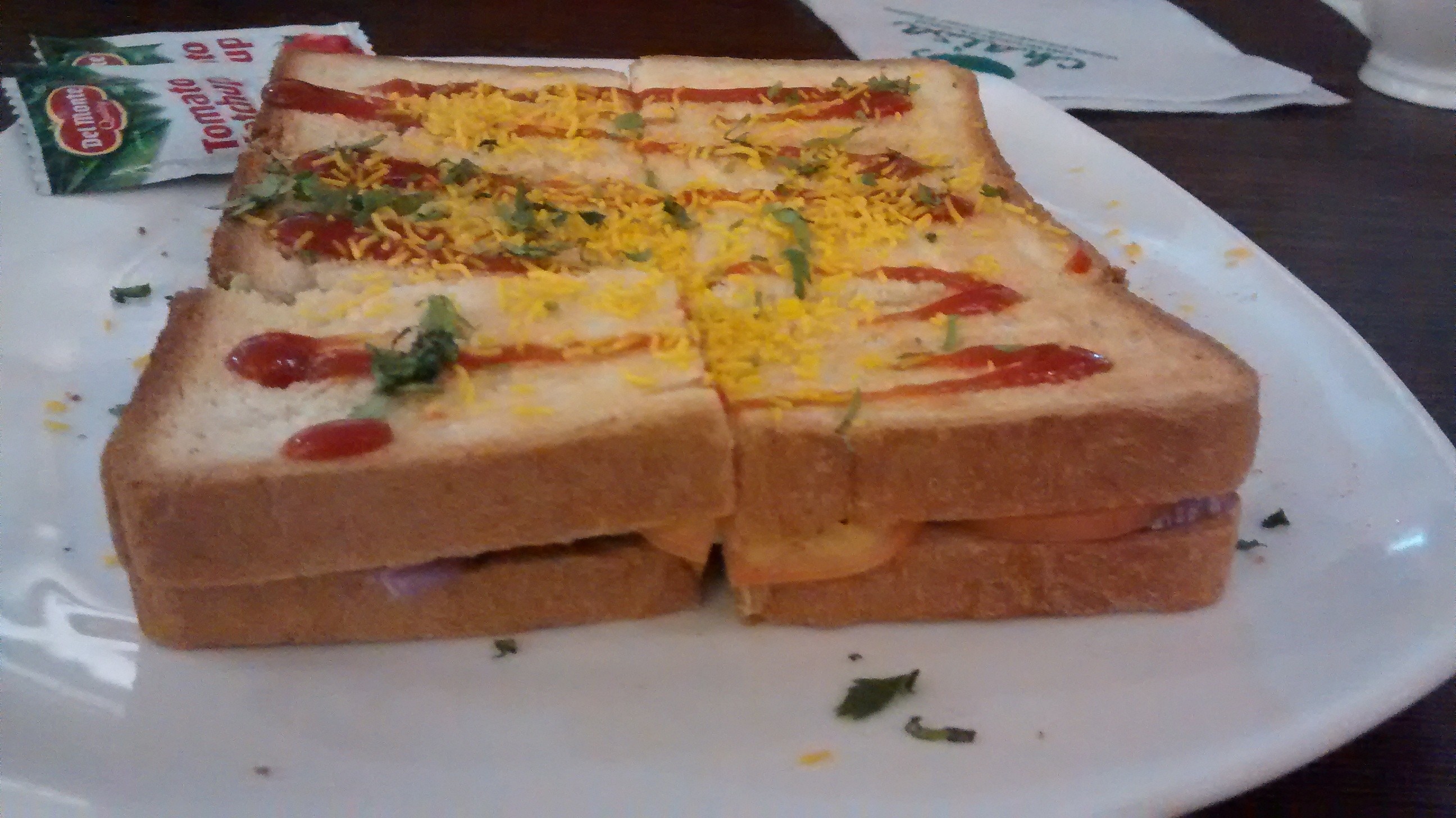
A Bombay sandwich served in Mumbai

The Bombay sandwich is primarily a street food, eaten as a snack or light meal. It is available in every part of Mumbai. A Bombay sandwich costs about 25 to 30 rupees (about US$0.4), as of 2018. It is popular among college students and office workers, and many vendors attract long lines. It is also served at restaurants. Charukesi Ramadurai of BBC News attributes the dish's popularity to its unique texture and flavour combination. Despite its popularity in the city, the Bombay sandwich is not well known outside of Mumbai. It is uncommon in Delhi, with a few vendors of the dish in Sadar Bazaar. It is served by some restaurants in the United Kingdom and the United States.

== See also ==
- Vada pav
- Dabeli
