= Natwar Gandhi =

American accountant

- Born: Mumbai, India
- Education: University of Bombay; Atlanta University; Louisiana State University
- Occupation: Accountant
- Known for: Chief Financial Officer of the District of Columbia (2007–2013)
- Board member of: Shakespeare Theatre Company; Arena Stage; Gallaudet University

Natwar Gandhi is an American accountant, and was chief financial officer for the District of Columbia, in the United States, from 2007 to 2013.

== Biography ==
Gandhi was born in Mumbai, India.

He graduated from University of Bombay, Atlanta University, and Louisiana State University. He started to work in 1957. He was special assistant to Jim Florio. He was assistant professor of accounting at the University of Pittsburgh. From 1976 until 1998, he was an adjunct professor at American University, Georgetown University, and the University of Maryland.

He was the chief financial officer, for the District of Columbia, from 2007 to 2013. In October 2012, SEC has launched an inquiry into audits handled by the D.C. Office of the Chief Financial Officer, requesting all reports from the office's internal affairs unit dating to January 2010. The Washington Post story highlighted that "Gandhi has come under intense scrutiny in recent weeks because of his long-standing policy of keeping the audits out of public view".

In 2019, Gandhi published his autobiography Still the Promised Land.

== Social work ==
Gandhi is on the board of Shakespeare Theatre Company, Arena Stage, and Gallaudet University.

== Works ==
- Still the Promised Land I-Lead, Incorporated, 2019. ISBN 9781938798238
