= Sanjyot Keer =

Indian chef and internet personality

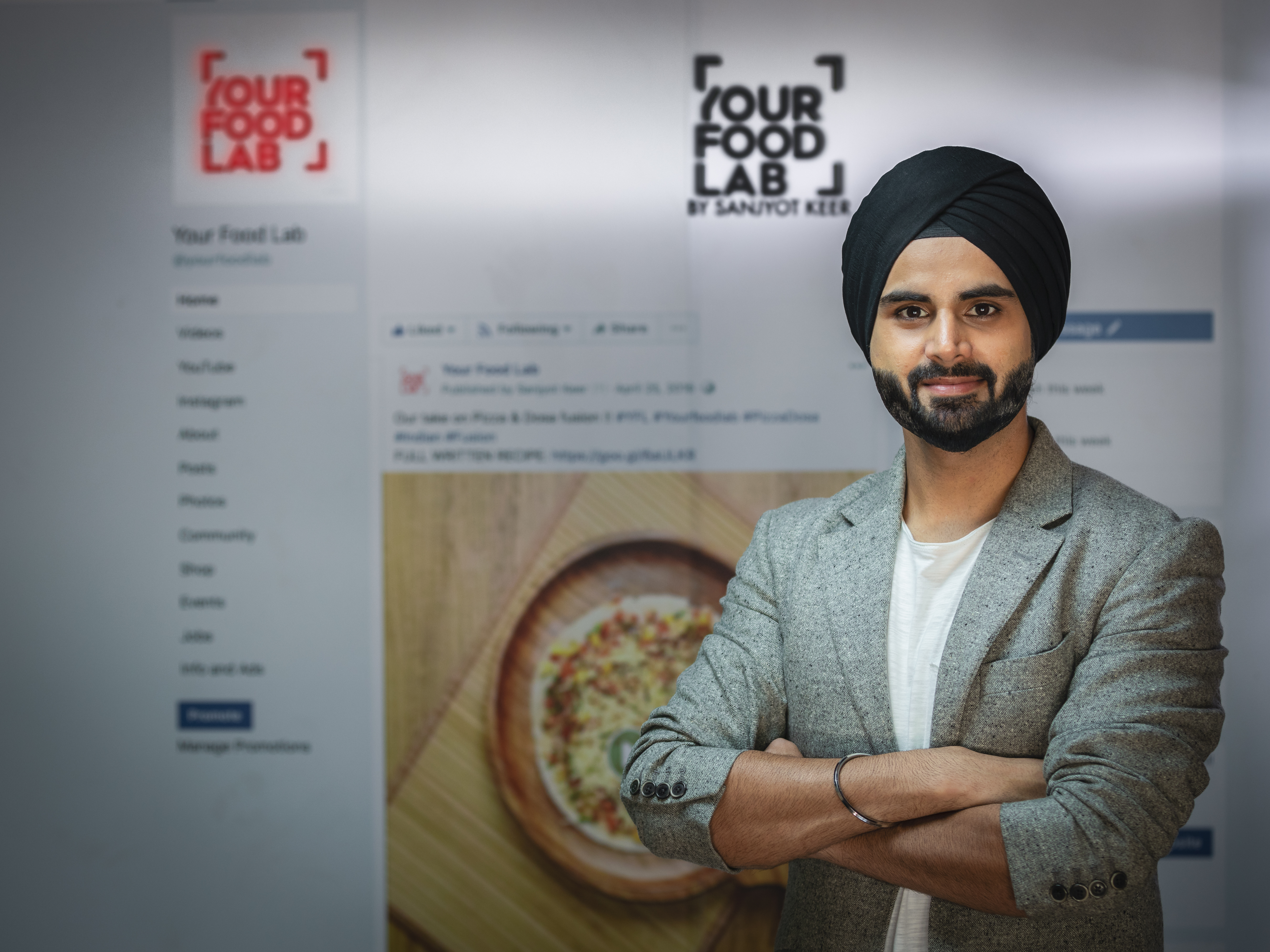
- Sanjyot Keer
- Born: June 16, 1992 (age 33); Mumbai, India
- Education: Queen Margaret University, Edinburgh
- Spouse: Payal Kapoor Keer
- Culinary career
- Cooking style: Indian cuisine
- Television show: MasterChef India (season 4)
- Award won: Tycoons of Tomorrow 2018 by Forbes India

Sanjyot Keer (born June 16, 1992) is an Indian chef and Internet personality, based in Mumbai, India. He was the food producer for TV competitive cooking show, MasterChef India (season 4), aired on Star Plus. Keer was featured in the list of Forbes India's Tycoons of Tomorrow 2018.

He is the founder of Your Food Lab (YFL). He gained recognition for posting cooking videos to Facebook and YouTube, which accumulated millions of views on his content.

== Education ==
He went to Queen Margaret University, Edinburgh.

== Career ==
In 2015, Sanjyot Keer worked for season four of MasterChef India, which is based on the British competitive cooking game show, MasterChef. He became the food producer for the MasterChef extra class series which was aired on Star Plus. He worked with chefs like Vikas Khanna, Sanjeev Kapoor and Ranveer Brar.

He is the founder of Your Food Lab (YFL), a Mumbai-based venture which was started in February 2016. It features Indian Comfort Food recipes for making Tandoori Momos, Peri Peri Dosa, and Khakra Sandwich.

In April 2016, Sanjyot released the first series of his cooking videos on Facebook. He put out a recipe for a pizza dosa on Facebook page of Your Food Lab and it received 30K views within the first 24 hours. The Livemint reported in January 2018, YFL videos got over 35.5 million views in August 2017, as per Vidooly.

In November 2018, Sanjyot launched tiffin-friendly recipes on Your Food Lab Junior, which is hosted by Sanjyot's nephew Iyan, a five year old kid.

== Television ==
Keer's television appearances are:

Year	Show (s)	Channel	Comment
2015	MasterChef India	Star Plus	Season 4

== Accolades ==
- Tycoons of Tomorrow 2018 by Forbes India

== See also ==
- List of Indian chefs
