= Amla Ruia =

Indian environmentalist

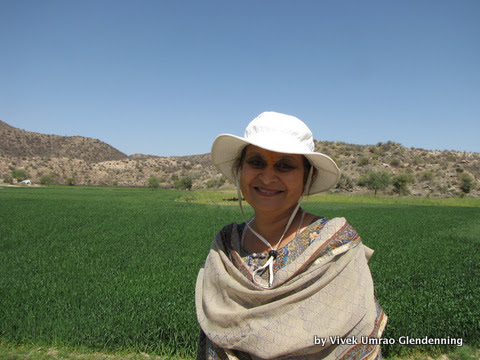
- Ruia in 2025
- Born: Uttar Pradesh, India
- Occupations: Entrepreneur, Water Activist and Educationist

Amla Ashok Ruia (born 1946) is an Indian environmentalist known for her work in water harvesting. She is also known as the Water Mother of India. In 2003, She founded the Aakar Charitable Trust to support drought prone rural areas by increasing the groundwater level through traditional water harvesting techniques in rural India. Her work transformed the lives of over 18 lakh villagers in Rajasthan and other Rural area, which were affected by severe water scarcity and poverty.

== Early life ==
Ruia was born in the state of Uttar Pradesh in 1946. She began engaging with community issues from young age.The droughts in Rajasthan from 1998 to 2000 and 2003 deeply affected her, and led her to focus on water conservation. She set up the Aakar Charitable Trust (ACT) to help villages in constructing check dams and preservtion to access water.

== Career ==
In 2006, she initiated a movement that begun with her first check dam in Mundawara, Rajasthan. Within three years, local farmers were able to earn Rs.12 crores from barren land via the two check dams built by Aakar Charitable Trust. This resulted in a number of successful stories in other villages, many of which have been labeled 'Crorepati Villages.

In 2017, Aakar Charitable Trust had built more than 200 check dams in more than 115 villages in Rajasthan, with flow-on effects to almost 200 other villages. The Trust provides 60-70% of the resources required to construct each check dam, while the village where the dam is sited provides 30-40% of resources, participates in its construction, and is responsible for its maintenance. and in that area groundwater recharge improved soil health and revived seasonal water bodies. Check dams help manage both droughts and floods with lower environmental impact than large dams. Reduced pump use cuts fuel and emissions. In saline areas, water quality was improved, and ponds were built where check dams were not feasible.

The check dams allow the aquifers to be replenished during the monsoon, so that bore wells and hand-pumps are recharged. Villagers have been able to grow up to three crops per year and keep livestock. Ruia estimates that the resulting increased income gives a 750% return on the investment in the check dams. Girls are able to attend school, as they no longer need to help their mothers carry water from long distances, and students can undertake tertiary education. Ruia is popularly known as Paani Mata ("Water Mother").

By June 2025, through her NGO, Aakar Charitable Trust, she has constructed 1,308 water bodies consisting of 814 check dams and 494 ponds on highly degraded, water-deficient arid lands spread over 11 Indian states. This work over the years has converted thousands of acres of arid land into irrigated farmlands yielding three crops per year. This, along with animal husbandry, is providing the beneficiary society an net income of Rs. 3,475 crores year after year. The work impacted to 1,258 villages in 11 states, and brought significant improvements to the deprived rural communities in India. For the last three years, with Aakar Charitable Trust, she has built over 300 water bodies in rural areas annually.

Amla and her team have extended their efforts in other states Madhya Pradesh, Maharashtra, Odisha, Uttar Pradesh and the Dantewada district in Chhattisgarh.

== Awards ==
- In 2025 Jamnalal Bajaj Award By CFBP for the Development and Welfare of Women and Children.
- In 2025 Vishalakshi Award (Art Of Living) by President Murmu for her contribution to sustainable Rural Development.
- In 2025 Grihshobha Inspire Awards for her work in water conservation.
- In 2019 Parmarth Ratna Puraskar by Parmarth Seva Samiti for her contribution to Elevating water scarcity.
- In 2018, she received the India Eye International Human Rights Observer Achievement Award 2018.
- In 2016, she was nominated for the Women of Worth Social Award category.
- In 2015 Devi Award by The Indian Express Group For being a Water Mother to a hundred villages.
- In 2011, Ruia was awarded a Lakshmipat Singhania - IIM Lucknow National Leadership Award in the category of Community Service and Social Upliftment.
- In 2008 FICCI FLO IWAAF Award by FICCI for her contribution to rural women welfare .

== Personal life ==
She currently lives in Malabar Hill, Mumbai, Maharashtra.
