= Raj Vadgama =

Indian ultramarathon runner

- Born: 18 June 1967 (age 58)
- Known for: Bharathon 10,000 km (6,200 mi) epic run across India

Raj Vadgama is an ultramarathon runner from Mumbai, India

== Career ==
Vadgama had set to run Bharathon 10000 km run across India by running 10,000 km (6,200 mi) across India in 165 days in 2014 He has also been a finisher at Badwater Ultramarathon, running 135 mi (217 km) in 44 hours 37 minutes 39 seconds
