= Ashiesh Shah =

Indian architect and designer

- Education: Parsons School of Design
- Occupations: Architect and designer

Ashiesh Shah is an Indian architect and designer. He was named one of the top 50 interior designers in India by Architectural Digest for 2014, 2015 and 2016.

== Early life ==
Shah hails from Mumbai. He graduated in Interior Architecture at Parsons School of Design.

== Career ==
Shah started collecting art at age fourteen. He started his career as an Interior architect in New York in the 2000s and then returned to Mumbai. In 2017, he opened design firm Atelier Ashiesh Shah in India.

== Recognition ==
- Top 50 interior designers in India (Architectural Digest) (2014, 2015 and 2016).
