= Garima Arora =

Indian chef

- Born: Garima Arora; Mumbai, India
- Education: Le Cordon Bleu, Paris
- Occupation: Chef (Regular)
- Spouse: Rahul Verma
- Children: 2
- Culinary career
- Cooking style: Indian
- Rating: Michelin stars
- Current restaurant(s): Gaa, Bangkok Marigold Delights
- Award won: Asia's Best Female Chef by World's 50 Best Restaurants

Garima Arora is an Indian master chef, judge hotelier, restaurateur and business woman. She earned her first Michelin star in 2018 for her restaurant Gaa, in Bangkok, becoming the first Indian woman to do so. In 2023, Gaa received its second Michelin star, making it only the second Indian restaurant globally to hold two-Michelin stars and Arora the first female Indian chef to run a two-Michelin star restaurant.

== Early life and career ==
Arora grew up in Mumbai, and is a member of the Punjabi Arora family. She initially pursued a career in journalism before becoming a chef.

In 2008, she left for France to study at Le Cordon Bleu in Paris and graduated in 2010. She worked with Gordon Ramsay and René Redzepi of Noma in Copenhagen before opening her own restaurant, Gaa, in Bangkok in April 2017.

Gaa is a modern Indian fine dining restaurant situated in a traditional Thai house in the heart of Bangkok.

She has confirmed that when cooking traditional Gujarati cuisine, she often looks to Gujju Ben's videos.

== Awards and associations ==
In November 2018, she and her restaurant were awarded a Michelin star, with Arora being the first female Indian chef to receive the distinction.

In March 2019, Restaurant Gaa made its debut on the Asia's 50 Best Restaurants list at No. 16, claiming the Highest New Entry Award.

In February 2019, Arora was named Asia's Best Female Chef for the year by World's 50 Best Restaurants.

In June 2019, Restaurant Gaa made its debut on the World's 50 Best Restaurants list at No. 95.

In August 2019, Arora launched Food Forward India, an initiative prioritizing the future of Indian food. The inaugural event, which took place in Mumbai on 17 October 2019, brought together Mumbai's brightest minds in the Indian food community to engage in a day filled with talks, food tastings and panel discussions.

She is one of the judges in Masterchef India 2023.

In December 2023, Arora was awarded her second Michelin Star. With this, she became the first and only female Indian chef to win two Michelin stars.
