= D. Y. Patil International University =

Private university in India

D. Y. Patil International University, Pune
- Type: Private
- Established: 2018
- Founder: D. Y. Patil
- Affiliations: UGC
- Chancellor: Dr. Sanjay D. Patil
- Vice-Chancellor: Dr. Manish Bhalla
- Location: Akurdi, Pune, Maharashtra, India; 18.646°N 73.759°E
- Website: dypiu.ac.in

D. Y. Patil International University, Pune is a private university located in Akurdi, Pune, Maharashtra, India.

== Schools ==
- School of Computer Science Engineering & Applications
- School of Engineering, Management and Research
- School of Biosciences and Bioengineering
- School of Commerce and Management
- School of Applied Arts & Crafts
- School of Design
- School of Humanities and Social Sciences
- School of Media and Journalism
