= Damodar Bangera =

Indian freedom fighter

Damodar Bhai Bangera was an Indian freedom fighter involved in Quit India Movement who hoisted the Indian national flag on the roof of the Supreme Court of India. He was imprisoned by the British government, but later awarded title of Rai Bahadur. He was from Billawa community.

In August, 2014, The Mira Bhayandar Municipal Corporation (MBMC) has renamed a road junction in Bhayandar after freedom fighter, Bhai Damodar Bangera.
