= Shri Swaminarayan Mandir, Mumbai (disambiguation) =

Not to be confused with BAPS Shri Swaminarayan Mandir (Mumbai), Dadar, Mumbai

The following Swaminarayan temples are located in the Indian city of Mumbai (Bombay):

- Shri Swaminarayan Mandir, Mumbai: The first Swaminarayan temple in the Mumbai, located in the heart of the city at Bhuleshwar.
- Shri Swaminarayan Mandir, Mumbai (Ghatkopar): Located in the eastern suburb of Ghatkopar
- Shri Swaminarayan Mandir, Mumbai (Mulund): Made in 1973, located in the eastern suburb of Mulund
- Shri Swaminarayan Mandir, Mumbai (Kandivali): Located in the western suburb of Kandivali

Shri Swaminarayan Mandir, Mumbai may also refer to:

- Shri Swaminarayan Mandir, Kalyan: Swaminaryan temple located in Kalyan, a satellite town of Mumbai.
- Shri Swaminarayan Gurukul, Navi Mumbai: Swaminarayan Gurukul located in Navi Mumbai, known as the twin city of Mumbai.
