= Shrimad Rajchandra =

Jain mystic poet from India

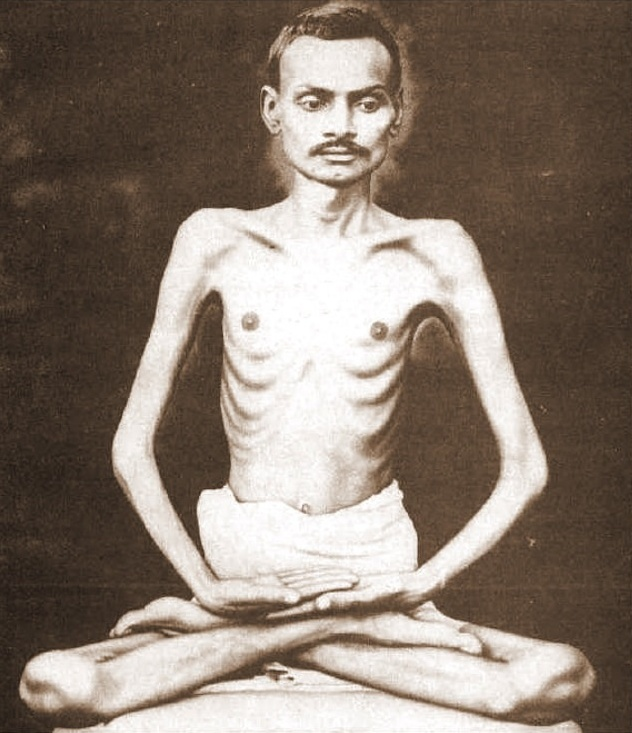
- Rajchandra in Lotus position

Personal life
- Born: Lakshminandan Ravjibhai Mehta; 9 November 1867 Vavaniya, Morbi State, British India (now in Gujarat, India)
- Died: 9 April 1901 (aged 33) Rajkot, Rajkot State, British India (now in Gujarat)
- Spouse: Jhabakben (m. 1887)
- Parent(s): Ravjibhai and Devbai
- Notable works: Atma Siddhi; Mokshamala
- Other names: Kavi; Raichandbhai; Param Krupalu Dev; Krupanath

Religious life
- Religion: Jainism

Three mantras of Shrimad Rajchandra:

સહજાત્મ સ્વરૂપ પરમગુરુ
The natural, pure Self is the Supreme Guru.

પરમગુરુ નિર્ગ્રંથ સર્વજ્ઞ દેવ
The Supreme Guru is the liberated one, free from all bondages, the all-knowing Divine.

આતમભાવના ભવતા જીવ લહે કેવળજ્ઞાન રે!
Through deep contemplation of the pure nature of the soul, it attains pure, infinite knowledge.

Shrimad Rajchandra (9 November 1867 – 9 April 1901), also known as Param Krupalu Dev, was a Jain poet, mystic, philosopher, scholar, and a major reformer from India. Born in Vavaniya, a village near Morbi, he attained recollection of his past lives at the age of seven. He performed Avadhāna, a memory retention and recollection test that gained him popularity, but he later discouraged it in favour of his spiritual pursuits. He wrote much philosophical poetry including Ātma-Siddhi-Śāśtra. He also wrote many letters and commentaries and translated some religious texts. He is known for his teachings on Jainism and his spiritual guidance to Mahatma Gandhi.

== Early life ==
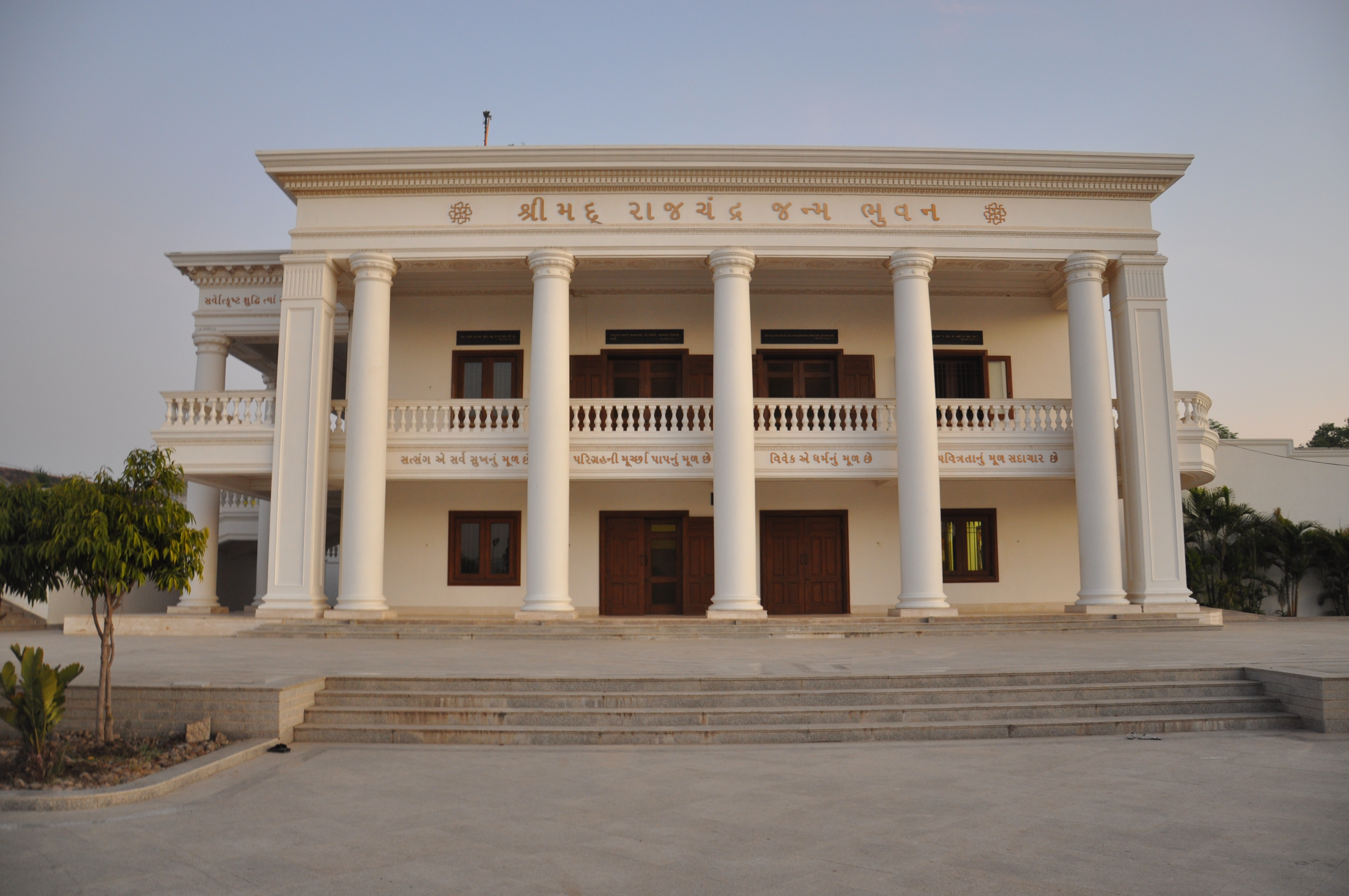
Shrimad Rajchandra Janma Bhuvan in Vavaniya

Shrimad Rajchandra was born on 9 November 1867 (Kartika Purnima, Vikram Samvat 1924), in Vavaniya, a port near Morbi (now in Gujarat, India). His mother, Devbai, was Śvetāmbara Sthanakvasi Jain and his father, Ravjibhai Mehta and paternal grandfather, Panchan Mehta, were Vaishnava Hindu. Hence he was influenced by both Jainism and Hinduism in his early years. He was initiated in Vaishnavism by a sadhu named Ramadasji, following which he also studied Vedanta. He continued to study other Indian religions and was attracted to ahiṃsā (non-violence) and bheda-vijñāna (practice of discrimination of the soul from transient activities and substances) doctrine of Jainism. Later, he chose Jainism because he considered that it provides "best path to salvation". In one of the letters to Mahatma Gandhi, Shrimad stated that the great souls like the Tirthankars have revealed knowledge of a thousand times deeper import than what the Vedas contain. Therefore, since something imperfect cannot be the origin of a perfect thing, it is not justified in asserting that all religions (including Jainism) had originated from the Vedas.

Shrimad, highlighting works of Anandghanji Maharaj, maintained that Jain philosophy held supreme place because it consisted the partial truths expressed by other schools into a complete perspective grounded in the vision of the omniscient Lords. He explained that while individual Indian philosophies emphasized in limited capacity over topics such as creation, karma, the soul, or liberation, Jainism addressed and harmoniously incorporated all these concepts and viewpoints without exclusion. To illustrate this, he re-affirmed the 'ocean and river' analogy that just as all rivers eventually flow into the ocean, the insights of various single sighted traditions ultimately converge within Jainism, which is regarded as reflecting the all encompassing knowledge of the Tirthankars. In this way, Shrimad stated that Jain philosophy resolved the questions and doubts left unanswered by other schools, presenting the most comprehensive path towards liberation. He preached that the path of liberation is open to all, regardless of caste, creed, or gender, sect and whether one lives as a monk or as a pious layperson, as mentioned in the sacred Sthānāṅga Sūtra.

His birth name was Lakshminandan Mehta. He was renamed Raichand by his parents when he was four years old. Later, his name changed to its Sanskrit form, Rajchandra. Shrimad, an honorific, was added by his disciples posthumously. His disciples also refer to him as Param Krupalu Dev (Lord of the Highest Compassion).

=== Recollection of previous lives ===
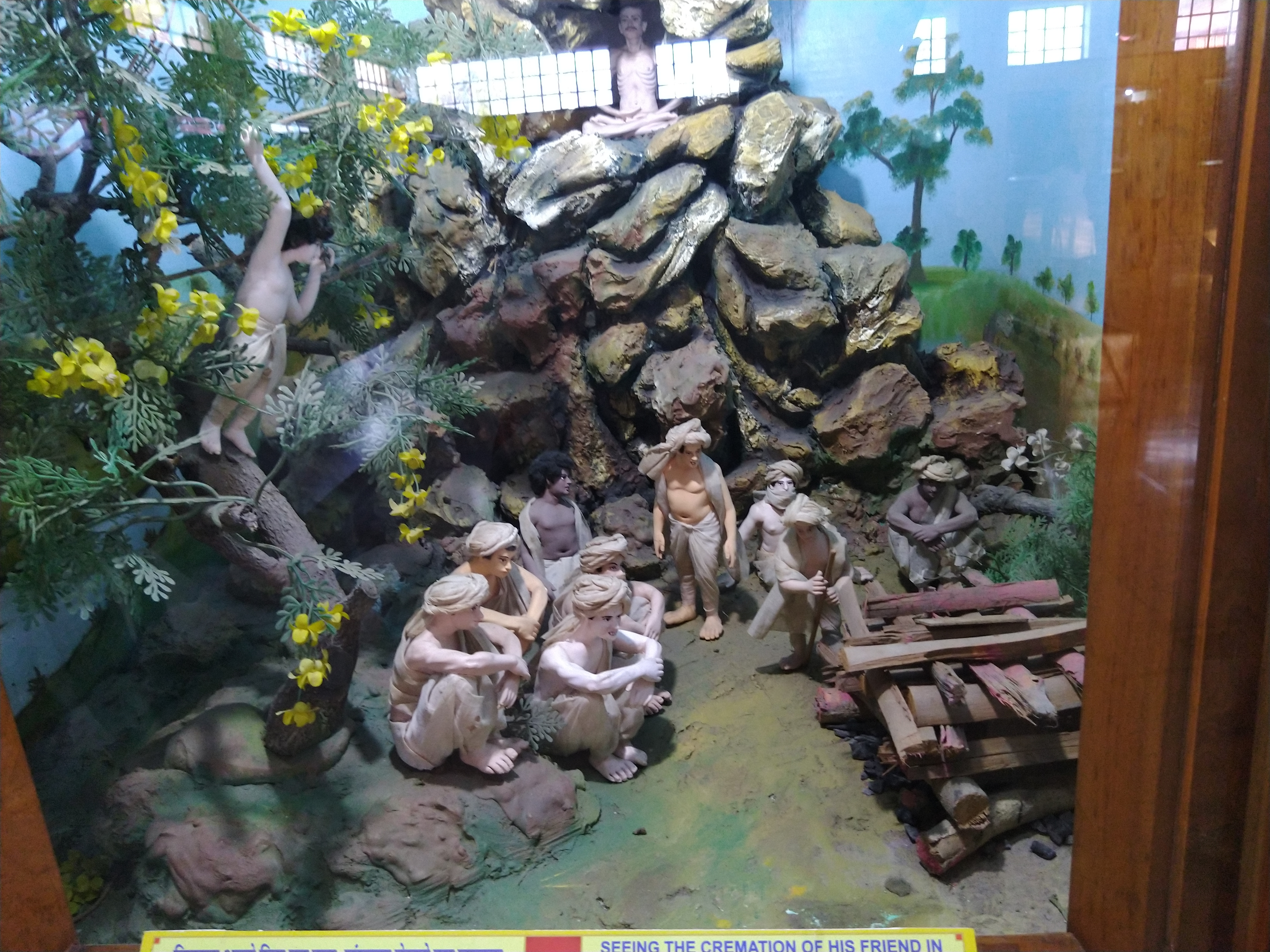
A diorama representing Rajchandra's seeing of cremation, Jain Museum, Madhuban, Giridih

Shrimad said that he first attained jāti-smaraṇa jñāna (recollection of previous lives) at the age of seven, in 1874. In an 1890 reply to a question from Padamshibhai, his friend in Bhuleshwar, Bombay, he described the incident:

When I was seven years old, an elderly man named Amichand, well-built, stout and sturdy, a neighbor in my village, suddenly died of a snake bite. I did not know what was death. I asked my grandfather as to what was the meaning of death. He tried to evade the reply and advised me to finish my meals. I insisted on a reply. At last he said: "To die means the separation of the soul from the body. A dead body has no movement, it contaminates and decays. Such a dead body will be burnt to ashes near a river-bank as it has ceased to function." Then I went secretly to the cremation ground and climbing a Babul tree I saw the whole process of cremation of the dead man's body and I felt that those who burnt him were cruel. A train of thoughts started on the nature of the death and as a result I could recollect my previous lives.

This incident played a pivotal role in his perception of the world. He described his spiritual journey in one of his poems. He wrote that he advanced on the path of spirituality he had already attained in his previous life. He claimed that he developed complete resignation and detachment to his mortal body and the rest of the world in 1897. He thanked the day of the experience in one of his poems written at the age of 30. The tree he climbed no longer exists, but a monument temple with a model of the event was erected on the site.

He experienced the same when he visited the fort in Junagadh. His experiences influenced him to live a religious life.

=== Prodigy ===
Shrimad had atypical memory retentiveness and recollection. He joined the school at the age of seven and half but mastered the preliminaries in calculation in just a month. In two years, he completed the study of seven grades.

At the age of eight, he started composing poems. He composed verse synopses on Ramayana and Mahabharata at the age of nine. He gained maturity in thinking and reasoning and by the age of 10 started public speaking. At the age of 11 he started writing articles in newspapers and magazines, such as in Buddhiprakash and won several prizes in essay writing competitions. He wrote a 300-stanza poem on 'a watch' at the age of 12. In 1880, he went to Rajkot to study English, but very little is known about his education there. By 1882, he had studied and mastered several subjects. He became known as a young poet and was referred to as Kavi due to it. He occasionally visited the residence of the ruler of Kutch as a writer and was praised for his penmanship. He started attending his father's shop aged 13. He composed many poems on the lives of Rama and Krishna while managing the shop. (Note: as written by Shrimad in his Samucchaya Vayacharya.)

== Later life ==
=== Avadhāna ===
Avadhāna is a difficult test of attention and recollection in which a person attends multiple objects and activities at a time. In 1884, Rajchandra came from Vavania to Morbi where he saw Shastri Shankarlal M. Bhatt performing eight Avadhāna at a time. Gattulalji Maharaj was performing the same in Bombay. He saw the performance and quickly picked it up. Just two days after the performance, he performed it in front of his friends and later in public. Initially he performed 12 Avadhāna in public in Morbi but later he performed 16 Avadhāna in audience of two thousand in Wadhwan Camp, which was praised in newspapers. He performed 52 Avadhāna in Botad in a private meeting with his friend Harilal Shivalal Sheth which included playing Chopat game with three players; playing cards with three players; playing chess; keeping count of the sound of a small gong; mentally computing arithmetic sums involving addition, subtraction, multiplication and division (4); keeping count of the movement of beads along a thread; solving eight new problems; composing verses on eight diverse topics selected at the time and in the specific metre chosen by various members of the audience (16); rearranging 400 words of various languages spoken in random order including Greek, English, Sanskrit, Hindi, Arabic, Latin, Urdu, Gujarati, Marathi, Bengali, Maru, Jadeji, in the right order of subject, predicate (16); teaching a student; contemplating various figures of speech (2); all at one time.

He performed śatāvadhāna (100 Avadhāna) at Sir Framji Cowasji Institute in Bombay on 22 January 1887, which gained him praise and publicity. He was awarded gold medals by institutes and public for his performances as well as title of 'Sakshat Saraswati' (Incarnation of the Goddess of Knowledge). Rajchandra believed that the publicity gained by such Avadhānas may become an obstacle in spiritual pursuits, so he gradually discouraged the performances and stopped it completely by age of 20. The performances attracted wide coverage in national newspapers. In September 1893, when in Chicago, Virchand Gandhi mentioned this feat at the Parliament of the World's Religions.

=== Later years ===
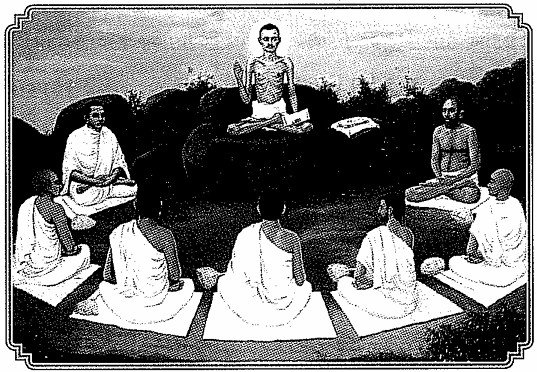
Shrimad giving discourse on Lord Mahavira's teachings to the leaders of all Jain sects at Idar.

In 1887 (Maha Sud 12, VS 1944), Rajchandra married Jhabakben, daughter of Popatlal, the elder brother of Revashankar Jagjivandas Mehta, a Zaveri merchant family. He then engaged in the pearl and diamond business. They had two sons and two daughters. His in-laws wanted him to move to Bombay and establish business there, but he was interested in his spiritual pursuits.

In 1890 (VS 1947), he experienced self-realization (shuddh samyak darshan) in Bombay. In His letter (Patrank 133) describing His state at the time, Shrimad wrote “Day and night, reflection upon the supreme reality alone prevails, that alone is the food, that alone is the sleep, that alone is the bed, that alone is the dream, that alone is the fear, that alone is the pleasure, that alone is the possession, that alone is the walking, that alone is the sitting. What more do I say? Bones, flesh and their marrow are only coloured in the colour of that alone." He continued his householder life for more six years and was successful in his business.

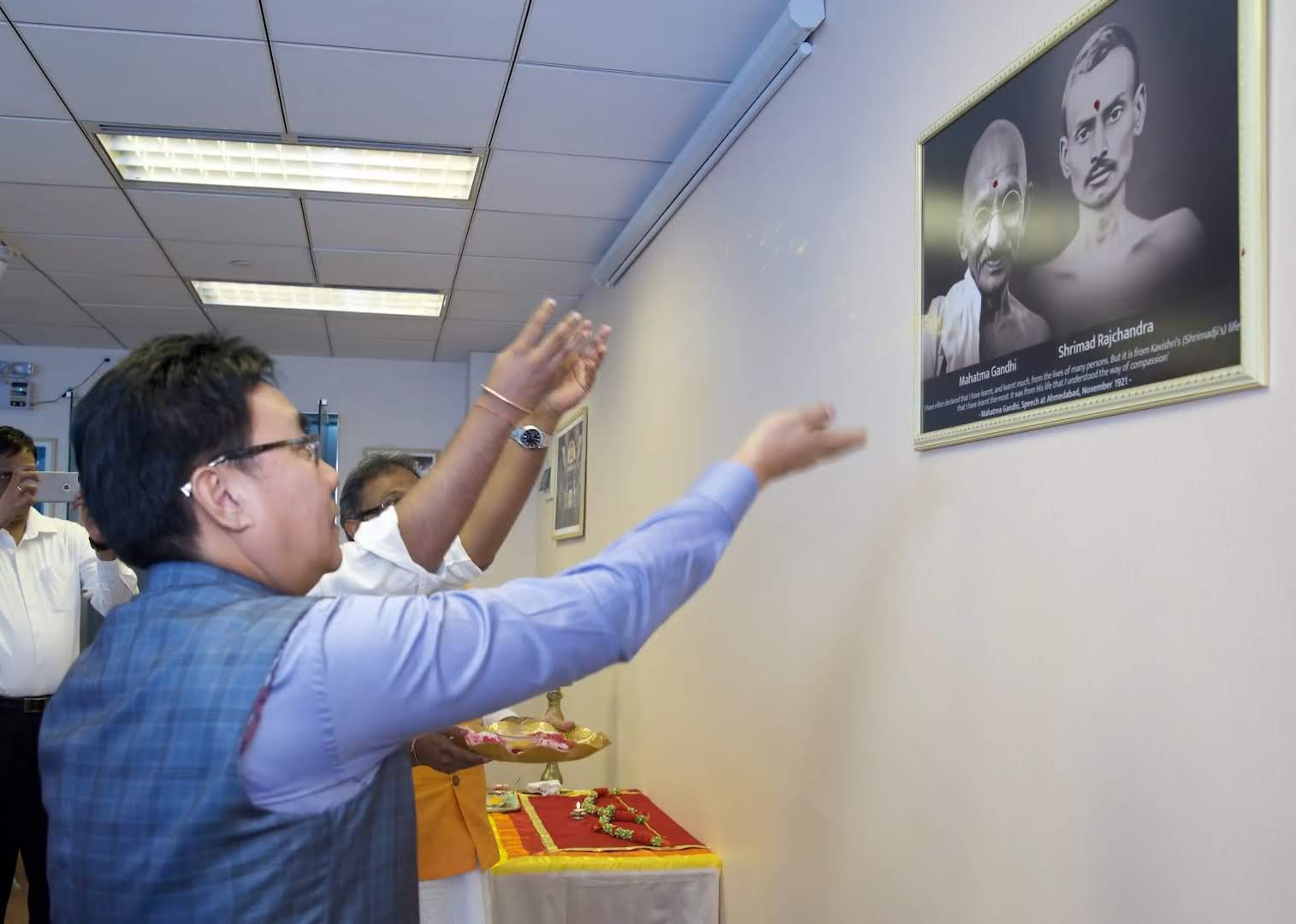
A portrait depicting Shrimad Rajchandra and Mahatma Gandhi being unveiled at The Consulate General of India in Guangzhou, China.

He is known as a spiritual guide of Mahatma Gandhi. They were introduced in Mumbai in 1891 and had various conversations through letters while Gandhi was in South Africa. Gandhi noted his impression of Shrimad Rajchandra in his autobiography, The Story of My Experiments with Truth, calling him his "guide and helper" and his "refuge in moments of spiritual crisis". He advised Gandhi to be patient and to study Hinduism deeply. His teaching directly influenced Gandhi's non-violence philosophy.

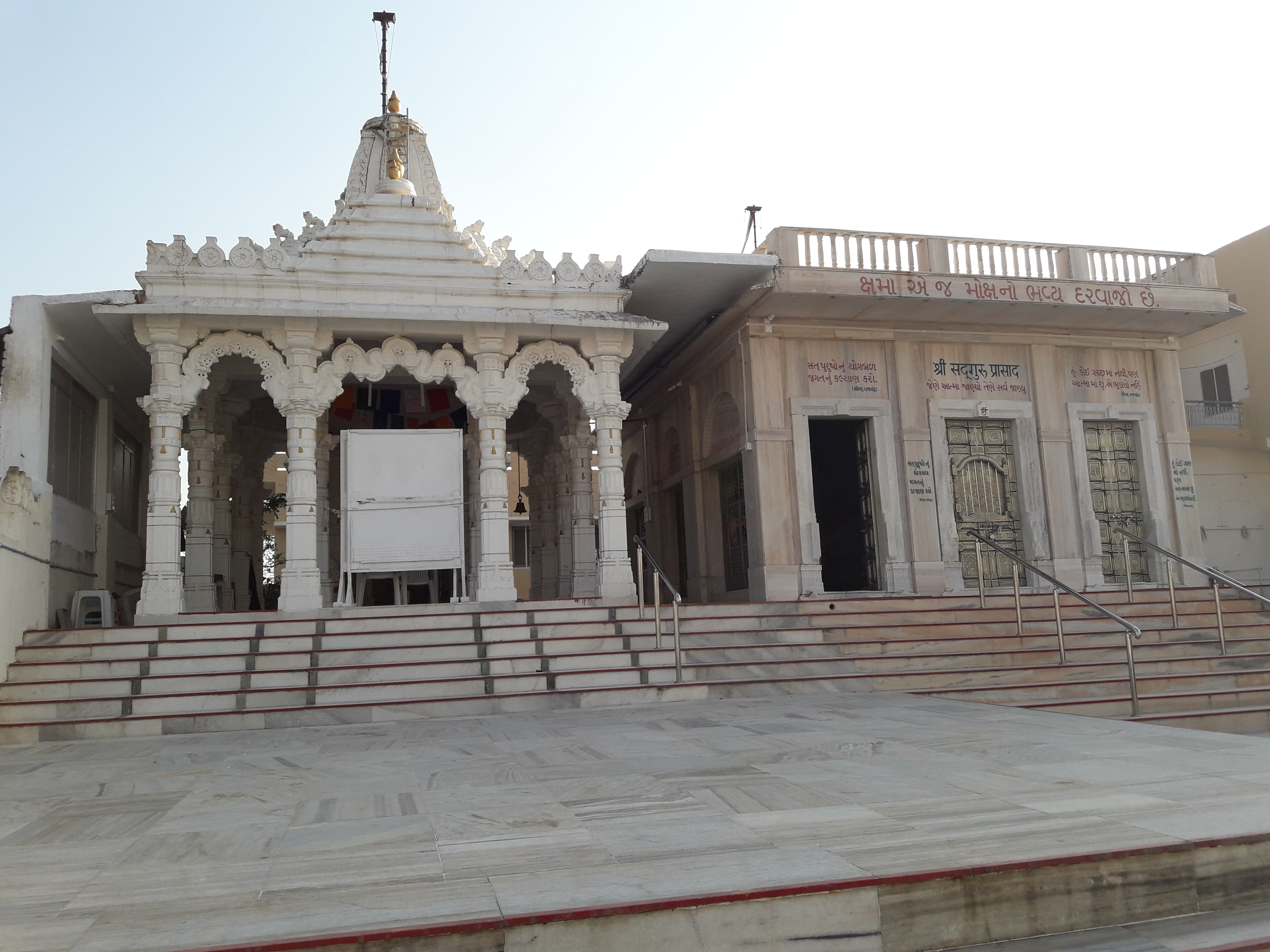
Shrimad Rajchandra Vihar located on the Idar hill where Shrimad Rajchandra gave discourses.

He stayed in Gujarat with his disciples and avoided moving to Bombay. He retired from householder life and business when he was thirty. He spent three months in Idar where he instructed seven monks in religious discourses sitting on a stone, pudhvi śila. A memorial temple and a prayer hall was later built there.

During his final years, he suffered from colitis. No specific cause of death was identified except extreme weakness. In 1900, he lost a large amount of weight. He was under medical supervision, and doctors advised him to move to coastal region of Gujarat for the benefit of his health. He contracted the illness during his stay in Dharampur, Gujarat, from which he never recovered. In 1901, he, his mother and wife stayed at Aga Khan's bungalow in Ahmedabad before moving to Wadhwan Camp. He died on 9 April 1901 (Chaitra Vad 5, VS 1957) in Rajkot (now in Gujarat) surrounded by his family, friends and disciples. A small photograph taken after his death is displayed in a library in Khambhat established by him. The room where he died is now a prayer hall dedicated to his memory.

== Works ==
Rajchandra wrote Stri Niti Bodhaka (The Nature of Ideal Moral Life for Women, 1884) in which he had advocated women's education as essential to national freedom. Sad-bodh-shatak (1884) is his work on ethical topics. Mokshamala (1887) is about Jainism and self-liberation written in an easy style understandable to young people. Due to delay in the publication of Mokshamala, he composed Bhavna Bodh for his readers. It was a small book of fifty pages in which he gave instructions to cultivate 12 sentiments to lead the life of non-attachment. He had composed Namiraja, a work of five thousand verses explaining the nature of the four purusharthas. In Shurvir Smarana (1885), Rajchandra described the brave warriors of the past and compared them with their descendants who are not able to free India from British dominance.

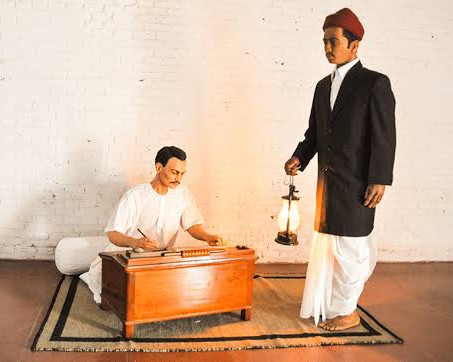
The statues of Shrimad Rajchandra and Ambalal which are erected by Shrimad Rajchandra Mission Dharampur in a room at Nadiad where Atma Siddhi was composed.

In Atma Siddhi, a Gujarati poem, he set forth six fundamental truths on soul which are also known as ṣatpada (six steps). He lays emphasis on right perception (samyaktva), personal efforts and a true teacher's guidance in the path to self-realisation. It is a summary of his interpretation of Jainism. It is adapted in a musical bhajan form by Shefali Shah. It is translated in English several times; the first by J. L. Jaini in 1923. Its popular translation was published by Brahmachari Govardhandas in 1957.

He wrote more than 900 letters which charts his spiritual journey and teachings to disciples. He also edited a newspaper, Vairagya Vilas.

Shrimad Rajchandra Vachanamrut is a collection of his complete works including letters and other writings.

His several poems are popular including "Apurva Avsar Evo Kyare Aavshe..", "Mool Marg Sambhlo Jinno Re..", "Bina Nayan Pavey Nahi..", "Hey Prabhu! Hey Prabhu! Shu Kahu..", "Yam Niyam Sanjam Aap Kiyo..", "Ichche Chhe Je Jogijan...,"Bahu Punya Kera Punjthi..." and "Hey Prabhu! Hey Prabhu! Shu Kahu.." were Mahatma Gandhi's favourite bhajans and were included in the Ashram Bhajanavali.

=== Translation and commentaries ===
Rajchandra wrote 51 quotes on Samyati Dharma (the religion of monk) as described in Dasha Vaikalika Siddhanta (VS 1945). It is Gujarati rendering of the original Magadhi text. He also wrote commentary on Moksha Siddhanta (VS 1953). He incompletely translated Chidanandji's Swarodayagyan. He wrote an incomplete commentary on Chauvisi of Anandghanji Maharaj. In his three letters (No. 393, 394 and 395 printed in "Shrimad Rajchandra Vachanamrut"), he commented on one of the couplets of sixth out of the eight perspective, Ath Yogdrashtini Sajjhaya composed by Upadhyay Yashovijayji Maharaj. He wrote equivalent Gujarati translation of the first 100 verses of Atmanushasan. He wrote on three Bhavna or Contemplations (Anitya, Asharan and a little on Sansara Bhavna) out of 12 Bhavna described in Shri Ratnakarand Shravakaachar. He completely translated Panchastikaya of Acharya Kundkunda. He had prepared an index on the Pragnavabodh (VS 1956).

== Influence and Legacy ==
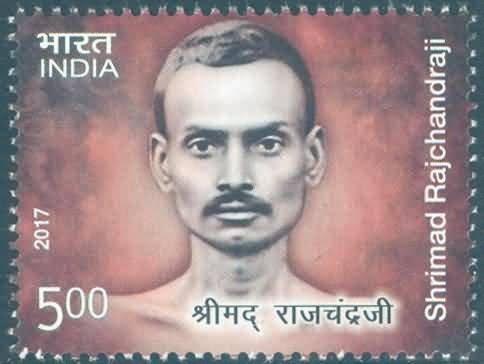
Stamp released by India Post in 2017

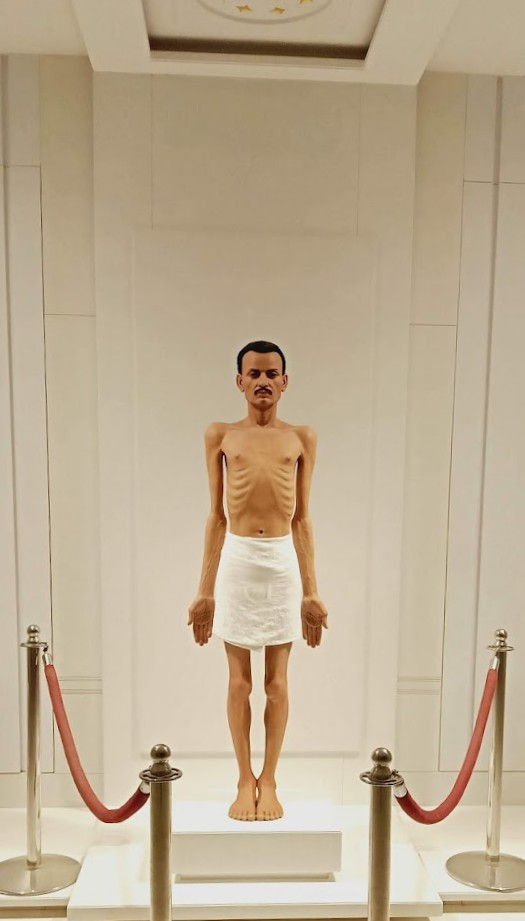
Idol of Shrimad Rajchandra in kayotsarga posture at Digambar Jain temple in Ville Parle, Mumbai

Rajchandra was inspired by works of Kundakunda and Digambara mystical tradition. Nominally belonging to the Digambara tradition, his followers sometimes consider his teaching as a new path of Jainism, neither Śvetāmbara nor Digambara, and revere him as a saint. His path is sometimes referred as Raj Bhakta Marg, Kavipanth, or Shrimadiya, which has mostly lay followers as was Rajchandra himself. His teachings influenced Kanji Swami, Dada Bhagwan, Rakesh Jhaveri, Saubhagbhai, Lalluji Maharaj (Laghuraj Swami), Atmanandji and several other religious figures. Some of them established temples and institutions in his dedication and to spread his teachings. Such temples often house his pictures and images based on photographs taken in a studio in various meditation postures just a month before his death. Shrimad Rajchandra's teachings have been popular in the Jain diaspora communities; mostly in East Africa, the United Kingdom and North America. Bauer notes that "[in] recent years there has been a convergence of the Kanji Swami Panth and the Shrimad Rajcandra movement, part of trend toward a more eucumenical and less sectarian Jainism among educated, mobile Jains living overseas."

A special cover featuring him and Rabindranath Tagore was published by the India Post on occasion of Gandhi Jayanti in 2002.

The Government of India released ₹10 coins, ₹150 souvenir coins and the stamps at the Sabarmati Ashram in Ahmedabad on 29 June 2017 as the commemoration of Shrimad Rajchandra's 150th birth anniversary. U.C. Riverside's College of Humanities, Arts and Social Sciences and the Department of Religious Studies announced the establishment the Shrimad Rajchandra Endowed Chair in Jain Studies on 17 February 2017.

Shrimad Rajchandra Mission Dharampur is a spiritual movement inspired from Shrimad Rajchandra. It was founded by Rakesh Jhaveri. It is headquartered in Dharampur, Gujarat and carries out social and spiritual activities.

A 34-feet idol - the world’s tallest statue of Shrimad Rajchandra was inaugurated in November 2017 at Shrimad Rajchandra Ashram, Dharampur by Rakesh Jhaveri and Sri Sri Ravishankar. A Grand Mahamastakabhishek of this idol happens every year, and in 2024 India's Home Minister Amit Shah and RSS Chief Mohan Bhagwat both performed this annual ritual. In March - April 2025, thousands of devotees performed Mahamastakabhishek of Shrimad Rajchandra statue at Shrimad Rajchandra Ashram, Dharampur on occasion of celebrating 125 Years of Shrimad Rajchandraji gracing Dharampur.

== In popular culture ==
In 2007, Apurva Avsar, a biographical play on Shrimad Rajchandra in Gujarati, was produced by Manoj Shah. A Gujarati play entitled Yugpurush: Mahatma na Mahatma depicting the spiritual relationship between Shrimad Rajchandra and Mahatma Gandhi was produced by Shrimad Rajchandra Mission, Dharampur, in November 2016. An animated biographical Gujarati film Shrimad Rajchandra directed by Bhairav Kothari was released in 2021.

On 4 August, 2022, Prime Minister Narendra Modi inaugurated various projects in Dharampur including Shrimad Rajchandra Hospital and women and childcare center which were named after him.

== Sources ==
- Bauer, Jerome (2004). "Kanji Swami (1890-1980)". In Jestice, Phyllis G. (ed.). Holy People of the World: A Cross-Cultural Encyclopedia. Vol. 1. ABC-CLIO. p. 464. ISBN 9781576073551.
- Flügel, Peter, ed. (2006), Studies in Jaina History and Culture: Disputes and Dialogues, Routledge, ISBN 978-1-134-23552-0
- Jain, Prakash C. (2025). Jains in India and Abroad: A Sociological Introduction. DK Printworld.
- Salter, Emma (2002). Raj Bhakta Marg: the path of devotion to Srimad Rajcandra. A Jain community in the twenty first century (Doctoral thesis). University of Wales. pp. 125–150 – via University of Huddersfield Repository.
