= Angadia =

Traditional Indian banking system

Angadia is a traditional banking system that has been prevalent in the Indian subcontinent for centuries. Angadia refers to a trusted network of individuals who specialize in the secure transportation of valuable goods, including cash, jewelry, and important documents. It originated in the state of Gujarat. Angadia services facilitate trade and commerce in the region. In exchange for their services, they charge a nominal fee. The system relies on a network of couriers, known as Angadias, who operate with utmost integrity and trustworthiness. The Angadia system is legal in India.

The business of angadias generally involves people from the Gujarati, Marwari people, and Malbari communities.

== History ==
Historically, Angadias were primarily employed by merchants, businesses, and individuals who required a secure means of transferring funds or valuable assets.

Traditionally, Angadias operated on a cash-based system, providing a reliable and confidential mode of transferring money. This made them particularly valuable in a society where formal banking services were not easily accessible or lacked the level of trust required for high-value transactions.

Angadias can be classified into distinct groups based on their specialized services. One category is dedicated to serving diamond traders, facilitating the transportation of rough and uncut diamonds from Gujarat to Mumbai's export houses. Another category focuses on the safe transportation of gold and silver. A third category assumes the responsibility of securely delivering substantial amounts of currency and diverse goods to and from Gujarat.

Prior to the late 1980s, Angadias used to travel with their consignments on horse carriages to Mumbai Central railway station. Due to security concerns and attacks by criminal gangs, they now receive police escort with two police vans accompanying them. Delivery personnel from different companies often travel together for safety reasons.

== Operations ==
The Angadia system operates on a foundation of trust and close-knit relationships. Clients entrust their valuables to the Angadia couriers, who handle and transport the goods with the highest level of security. These couriers are known for their discretion, professionalism, and dedication to delivering the entrusted items.

In recent years, the Angadia system has faced some challenges due to increased regulatory scrutiny and the emergence of formal banking channels. However, it continues to thrive in certain sectors and regions where the need for secure and confidential financial services remains high.

Angadias transports high-value goods and cash between Mumbai and Gujarat on a daily basis. It is estimated that these individuals handle several hundred crore rupees worth of goods and cash in their operations. Various estimates suggest that the combined value of goods and cash transported by Angadias annually ranges between ₹70,000 crore and ₹1 trillion.

As of 2017, Approximately 200 angadias operate in Mumbai, while an additional 200 can be found in cities like Ahmedabad, Rajkot, Surat, and Baroda. They primarily conduct their operations in areas such as Bhuleshwar, Opera House, and Zaveri Bazaar in South Mumbai, as well as in northern suburbs like Malad, Borivli, and Ghatkopar.
