= Jhaveri =

Jhaveri is an Indian surname, common among Sindhis and Gujarati banias. The word "Jhaveri" (also spelled Zaveri or Javeri) means jeweler, and is derived from the Arabic Javahari. Though not all people with surname Jhaveri are jewellers by profession, the surname indicates that their ancestors may have been jewelers.

People with surname Jhaveri:

- Shantidas Jhaveri (c. 1580s–1659), influential Indian jeweler and merchant during the Mughal era
- Umar Hajee Ahmed Jhaveri, Indian-South African businessman
- Krishnalal Jhaveri (1868–1957), India writer and judge
- Darshana Jhaveri (b. 1940), Indian Manipuri dancer
- Dileep Jhaveri (b. 1943), Gujarati poet from India
- Rakesh Jhaveri (b. 1966), Jain spiritual leader from India
- Anjala Zaveri, Indian-British actress
- Ankita Jhaveri, Indian actress
- Mansukhlal Jhaveri (1907–1981), Gujarati poet and critic
- Dilip Ratanchand Jhaveri (1939-2019), Indian-American architect and urban planner
- Dharav Jhaveri (1984), Indian-Gujarati IT Businessman

== See also ==
- Jhaveri Bazaar, the jewelers market in Mumbai, India
