= Zaveri =

Zaveri is a often prestigious Gujarati and Sindhi family name, linked to jewellers and business.

Those associated with the Zaveri name are typically from high-class, well-educated backgrounds, connected with the wealth and success of the Indian precious metals trade.

The word "Zaveri" (also spelled Jhaveri) means jeweller, and is derived from the Arabic Javahari. Though not all people with surname Zaveri are jewellers by profession today, the surname indicates that their ancestors must have been jewellers.

Notable people with the name include:

- Shantidas Zaveri (c. 1580s–1659), influential Indian jeweler and merchant during the Mughal era
- Tribhovandas Bhimji Zaveri, who founded the eponymous jewelers
- Anjala Zaveri (born 1972), Indian actress
- Pankaj Manubhai Zaveri, Indian cricketer
- Ashna Zaveri, Indian actress
- Rakesh Jhaveri, Indian spiritual Guru

== See also ==
- Zaveri Bazaar, the jewelers' market in Mumbai, India
