= Mumba Devi Temple =

Hindu Temple in Mumbai, India

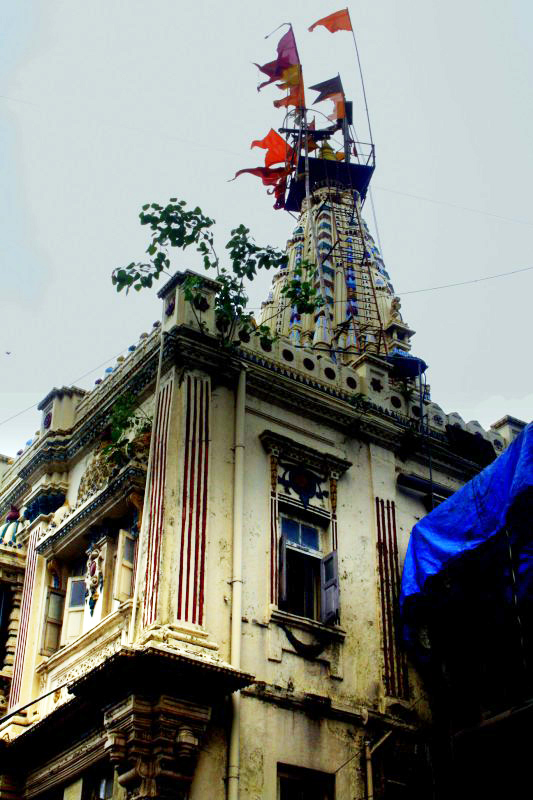

- Location within Mumbai, Maharashtra

Religion
- Affiliation: Hinduism
- District: Mumbai City
- Deity: Mumbadevi (Parvati), Maha Amba Devi
- Festival: Navratri

Location
- Location: Bhuleshwar
- State: Maharashtra
- Country: India
- Coordinates: 18°57′0″N 72°49′48″E

Architecture
- Completed: 1635

Website
- mumbadevi.org.in

Mumba Devi Temple is a Hindu temple in Mumbai, Maharashtra, India, dedicated to the goddess Mumbā, the local incarnation of the Parvati (Mother goddess). Mumba Devi is the goddess of the city of Mumbai. The name Mumbai is derived from Mumba Devi.

The creek and fort are now deteriorated to a point at which they are but derelict reminders of the city's past. The temple, on the other hand, is still active.

The goddess Mumba was the patron deity of the Marathi speaking Koli people, the original inhabitants of the Seven Islands of Bombay. She is depicted as a black stone sculpture in the temple. A popular etymology of Mumba is "Maha Amba," or "Great Mother," one of the many well-known names for the Hindu Mother Goddess (Devi)in India. Located in the Bhuleshwar area in South Mumbai, the temple is in the heart of the steel and clothing markets. It is a sacred pilgrimage spot and place of worship for Hindus and is thus visited daily by hundreds of people. It is not uncommon for visitors to Mumbai to pay their respects at the temple and is one of the popular tourist attractions in Mumbai.

== History ==
This temple was built in honour of the Goddess Amba. The Mumba devi temple is six centuries old. The first Mumbadevi temple was situated at Bori Bunder and is believed to have been destroyed between 1739 and 1770. After the destruction a new temple was erected at the same place at Bhuleshwar. The Goddess personifies Mother Earth and is still worshipped by the Hindu population of the Indo-Gangetic Plain and South India alike. The original temple built at the site where the Chhatrapati Shivaji Terminus earlier was by Koli fishermen was demolished around 1737 and a new temple was erected in its place at Phansi Talao. The modern shrine contains an image of the Goddess Mumba devi dressed in a robe with a silver crown, a nose stud and a golden necklace. To the left is a stone figure of Annapurna seated on a peacock. In front of the shrine is a Tiger, the carrier of the Goddess.

The present name of the city is derived from the Goddess Mumba devi. The temple itself is not impressive but is an important landmark as it is dedicated to Mumba Devi, the city's patron deity. The international name of the city is Mumbai. It is an anglicized version of the Portuguese name used by the British when they took control of the city in the 17th century. The name the city was referred to as Bom Bahia, meaning 'good bay'.

== Legend ==
The temple is dedicated to goddess Parvati (also known as Gauri) in her fisherwoman form. To take the form of Mahakali, goddess Parvati had to gain perseverance and concentration. At that time Lord Shiva (husband of goddess Parvati) insisted goddess Parvati to reincarnate in the form of a fisherwoman by which she can gain the ability of perseverance and concentration as a fisherman gains both these qualities while learning fishing. Goddess Parvati then incarnated as a fisher woman and took hermitage at the place of fishermen (current location—Mumbai). Goddess Parvati at her early age was known as Matsya and later she came to be known as Mumba in her fisherwoman form. Mumba dedicated herself in learning perseverance and concentration under the guidance of fishermen as they were keen in their profession of catching fishes by concentration and perseverance. When Mumba mastered the techniques of perseverance and concentration, the time came for her to return to her abode from where she had come. Lord Shiva came in the form of fisherman and married Mumba realising, who she truly was. Later the fishermen requested her to stay there forever and so she became the village goddess (grama devata). As she was signified as "Aai" (meaning 'mother' in Marathi) by the people living there, she came to be known as Mumba Aai. And Mumbai got its name from her.

== Places to see ==
The Mumba devi road is to the right from the northern end of Zaveri Bazaar. It is a narrow street lined with stalls selling a spectrum of objects associated with Hindu religion – copper bracelets, rings, rudraksha malas, brass lingams, photographs of deities, incense, saffron and so on. Ochre clad sadhus flit along the street, their foreheads smeared with ash paste and vermilion.
