= Shrimad Rajchandra Hospital =

- Shrimad Rajchandra Love and Care

Geography
- Location: Dharampur, Valsad, Gujarat, India
- Coordinates: 20.5371°N 73.1877°E

Services
- Beds: 250

History
- Opened: 14 April 2003

Links
- Website: https://hospital.srmd.org/
- Lists: Hospitals in India

Shrimad Rajchandra Hospital is a charitable, multi-bed hospital located in the city of Dharampur in the Valsad district of Gujarat, India. The hospital currently operates under the administration of Shrimad Rajchandra Love and Care, a non-governmental organisation (NGO) which runs the hospital and other charitable activities. Established in 2003, it provides medical care at nominal rates or completely free of cost. Hospital records show that over 125,000 patients were treated in 2016, and over 1 million patients have been treated since the inception of the hospital in 2004.

== History and organization ==
Shrimad Rajchandra Hospital was established on 14 April 2003 (on the day of Mahavir Jayanti) by Rakesh Jhaveri, the founder of Shrimad Rajchandra Mission, Dharampur. The hospital was set-up in two distinct phases - during the first phase of development, only allopathic and homeopathic dispensaries were operational. By the end of the second phase, which was completed in July 2004, the hospital was fully operational and was offering complete medical services.

== Shrimad Rajchandra Hospital and Research Centre ==
A new 250-bed multispeciality hospital was inaugurated on 4 Aug 2022 by Narendra Modi, PM of India in Dharampur.

== Facilities and current operations ==
The main campus of Shrimad Rajchandra Hospital is located at Mohangad, in the city of Dharampur. The hospital's neonatal intensive care unit (NICU) handles over 500 cases annually. As of Aug 2022, the hospital had a total staff of 320 persons, including clinical and non-clinical staff members. The hospital functions as a charitable hospital and offers all of its services at highly subsidised or free rates. Under the hospital's policy, all patients who are unable to afford treatments or who are uninsured, are provided with medical care free of charge.

The main campus of Shrimad Rajchandra Hospital is located at Mohangad, in the city of Dharampur. The hospital's neonatal intensive care unit (NICU) handles over 500 cases annually. As of Aug 2022, the hospital had a total staff of 320 persons, including clinical and non-clinical staff members. The hospital functions as a charitable hospital and offers all of its services at highly subsidised or free rates. Under the hospital's policy, all patients who are unable to afford treatments or who are uninsured, are provided with medical care free of charge.

SRH offers a wide range of services through its departments of obstetrics and gynaecology, paediatrics and neonatology, urology, pathology, dermatology, prosthetics and orthotics, physiotherapy, and dentistry. The hospital also has two general operating theatres and a 24-hour emergency operating theatre. From the period of July 2004 to March 2015, over 5,300 recorded surgeries have been completed at Shrimad Rajchandra Hospital.

The hospital also offers services such as a 24-hour emergency service and emergency operating theatre, a 24-hour cardiac ambulance service, a blood storage unit, and a fully equipped medical store.

Some of the hospital's other services include:

- Neonatal Intensive Care Unit (NICU) and Shrimad Rajchandra District Early Intervention Centre

The hospital's NICU treats over 500 cases annually, and is one of the most advanced and well-equipped facilities in the district of Valsad. After recovering from the NICU, infants in need of early intervention procedures are referred to the Shrimad Rajchandra District Early Intervention Centre (SRDEIC) for further treatment. The SRDEIC was established in January 2011 and has been recognised as a model centre by the Government of Gujarat. Through a Memorandum of Understanding signed between the Government of Gujarat and SRH in December 2014, the SRDEIC has been appointed to train staff of other early invention centres.

- Shrimad Rajchandra Viklang Centre (SRVC)

The only centre of its kind in the Valsad district, the SRVC provides holistic rehabilitation services for the physically and neurologically challenged. Established in January 2011, the centre offers consultations with orthopaedics, neuro-physicians, speech therapists, and physiotherapists. SRVC also organises outreach camps through which medical care is provided at the doorstep of patients in remote and typically inaccessible areas. As of November 2015, more than 40 such camps had been conducted through which cover 1,200 patients benefited. SRVC works in partnerships with various other NGOs such as Bhansali trust, BAIF's associate organization, DHRUVA (Dharampur Uttham Vahini), JNPCT (Jashoda Narottam Public Charity Trust) and ARCH (Action Research in Community Health). It also works with government run Primary Health Centres (PHCs) and anganwadis.

- Shrimad Rajchandra Child Malnutrition Treatment Centre (SRCMTC)

Started in November 2015, the Shrimad Rajchandra Child Malnutrition Treatment Centre (SRCMTC) provides medical services to severely undernourished children. Patients are typically provided with nutrition and essential supplements under direct medical supervision at the centre.

- Shrimad Rajchandra Health Education Centre for Adolescents (SRHECA)

As part of its aim to spread basic health awareness, the hospital started the Shrimad Rajchandra Health Education Centre for Adolescents (SRHECA) in November 2015. The SRHECA holds regular workshops and lectures for adolescent girls in order to prepare them for a safe and healthy motherhood.

- Shrimad Rajchandra Mobile Dental Clinic

Similar to the outreach camps conducted by SRVC, the hospital also organises regular visits of a mobile dental van to remote areas of Valsad. Qualified dentists provide dental care and help to patients at their doorstep and refer the patients to SRH if further specialised treatment is necessary.

- Shrimad Rajchandra Medical Camps

Shrimad Rajchandra Medical Camps are free multi-diagnostic treatment camps held in Dharampur and surrounding villages. These camps have also been conducted in Darbhanga, Vavania, Nairobi and Makueni County.

== Private-public partnerships with the Government of India ==
The hospital continues to receive support from the government through multiple private-public partnerships.

In December 2006, SRH was registered under the Chiranjeevi Scheme of the Government of Gujarat, under which the government supports hospitals that provide free medical services for pregnant women. In 2009, the Government of Gujarat introduced the Bal Sakha Scheme under which infants born to families below the poverty line (BPL) are treated free of cost. SRH has been a participating hospital in this scheme since its inception. SRH is also participant in the Government of Gujarat's Sarva Shiksa Abhiyan (SSA). Through the SSA, students with physical disabilities are referred to hospitals for further consultations and treatment. Several students from the areas of Valsad, Surat, and Surendranagar, have been referred through the SSA to Shrimad Rajchandra Viking Centre (SRVC), one of the hospital's departments.

Under the Government of India's ADIP (Assistance to Disabled Persons), SRH receives a grant-in-aid for supplying artificial limbs and appliances for the rehabilitation of physically challenged persons.

SRH was also one of the first hospitals that was authorised to treat patients under the Government of India's Rashtriya Swasthya Bima Yojna (RSBY). The RSBY scheme, launched by the Ministry of Labour and Employment, provides health insurance coverage for underprivileged families living below the poverty line (BPL). Under this scheme, admitted patients receive treatment and medicines up to Rs. 30,000 free of charge.

The hospital has also signed a series of Memorandum of Understanding (MoU) agreements with the Government of Gujarat.

In September 2015, SRH signed an MoU with the Government of Gujarat which requires SRH to provide tertiary-level healthcare services to mothers referred to or approaching the hospital. A similar MoU was signed in 2014, which mandates SRH to provide tertiary-level care for newborn babies and infants referred to the hospital. Another MoU signed in December 2015 mandates SRH's Shrimad Rajchandra District Early Intervention Centre (SRDEIC) to train staff of other early intervention centres.

In January 2024, a medical and cultural exchange between Stanford Medicine, Shrimad Rajchandra Hospital and Research Centre (SRHRC) and the Government of Gujarat was held.

== Awards and recognition ==
In 2011, Shrimad Rajchandra Hospital was privileged to be granted the ‘First Referral Unit’ (FRU) by the Government of Gujarat. This prestigious honour is granted to hospitals that are fully equipped to provide emergency obstetric care, new-born care, emergency care of sick children etc. with round-the-clock services of a gynaecologist and paediatrician.

In April 2013, SRH was presented with an aware for ‘Excellence in Real Health Care’ at the Medscape India National Awards. The award was in recognition of the significant contribution of SRH in field of rural healthcare services.

In December 2015, the Government of Gujarat recognised SRH's District Early Intervention Centre (SRDEIC) as the first model centre. The Government and SRH also signed an MoU which mandates SRH to train staff of other early invention centres.

== Fundraising activities ==
Shrimad Rajchandra Love and Care has been participating in the Standard Chartered Mumbai Marathon since 2011. It has been the highest fund-raising NGO for seven consecutive years collecting approximately 77.26 lakh in 2011, 96.92 lakh in 2012, 1.38 crore in 2013, 1.5 crore in 2014 1.6 crore in 2015. 2.56 crore in 2016. 3.83 crore in 2017.
