= Waghura =

- village
- Location in Gujarat, India Waghura (India)
- Coordinates: 23.008510°N 69.798954°E
- Country: India
- State: Gujarat
- District: Kachchh

Languages
  - Official: Gujarati, Hindi
- Time zone: UTC+5:30 (IST)
- Vehicle registration: GJ-
- Website: gujaratindia.com

Waghura is a village in Mundra Taluka of Kachchh District of Gujarat, India.

== Notable people ==
- Curumsey Damjee
