= Yugpurush (play) =

- Original language: Gujarati
- Written by: Uttam Gada
- Music by: Sachin–Jigar
- Characters: Shrimad Rajchandra; Mahatma Gandhi
- Subject: Spirituality
- Genre: Biographical play

Premiere
- Date: 14 November 2016
- Place: Mumbai, India
- Directed by: Rajesh Joshi

Yugpurush: Mahatma Na Mahatma is a 2016 Gujarati play based on the relationship between Jain philosopher Shrimad Rajchandra and Indian independence leader Mahatma Gandhi. The play depicts the spiritual journey of Gandhi. It is written by Uttam Gada and directed by Rajesh Joshi. The original song for the play is composed by Sachin–Jigar. It is produced by Shrimad Rajchandra Mission, Dharampur and inspired by its founder Pujya Gurudevshri Rakeshbhai. The play is adapted into seven total languages including English, Bengali, Hindi, Marathi, Tamil and Kannada. It won the Best Drama award at the 16th Annual Transmedia Gujarati Screen and Stage Awards 2016. The play has completed 1004 shows as of November 2017.

== Plot ==
Yugpurush highlights the values of love, selflessness, diversity, truth and community building through the story of Mahatma Gandhi and Shrimad Rajchandra. The play examines how Gandhi met Shrimad for the first time after returning from England in 1891. Even after Gandhi moved to South Africa, they continued to exchange letters. These letters played a pivotal role in shaping Gandhi’s character. Their honest friendship blossomed and Gandhi proclaimed Shrimad as his spiritual mentor. Shrimad was the one who inherited principles of truth, ahimsa and dharma which were later crystallized as the fundamental tenets of Gandhism. Shrimad died at an early age of 33 and the letters composed by him were then, the only companion of Gandhi. Mahatma Gandhi remained indebted to the teachings of his mentor and now he is celebrated as the global messenger of non-violence.

== Production and premiere ==
The Gujarati play premiered on 14 November 2016 in Mumbai, India. Its Hindi version premiered in December 2016 at the Royal Opera House, Mumbai. The Kannada premiere of the play took place in March 2017 at the Vidhana Soudha, the legislative assembly of Karnataka. The play was also shown at the Vidhan Sabha in Madhya Pradesh in March 2017. The play had its Marathi premiere in Mumbai in the presence of chief minister Devendra Fadnavis. The play had its first international premiere in Manchester in April 2017. The play had its 550th show in Kolkata in the Bengali language in May 2017.

Proceeds from the play are donated towards the non-profit Shrimad Rajchandra Love and Care for the purpose of building a 250-bed multi-specialty hospital in Dharampur, Gujarat.

== Reception ==
The play was well received by critics. "Right through the play, the sets change very swiftly and effectively reflecting scenes from the lives of both these great men and are a visual treat to watch. The actors themselves had an authentic ring to their performance," wrote Dipal Gala in her review in The Times of India. Mahatma Gandhi's great-grandson, Tushar Gandhi said, "What is important for me is the humility and the selflessness that Shrimadji instilled in Bapu. I hope you take this play all over the world, but especially to those places that need it the most - where the message of Ahimsa is absent." Kumarpal Desai, Jain scholar, writer and social worker said, "Shrimadji gave Ahimsa to Gandhiji, that same Ahimsa then went to Martin Luther King followed by Nelson Mandela. Not just for this generation and the next, the play will inspire the world to walk on the path of Satya and Ahimsa." Shreyansh Shah, managing editor and publisher of Gujarat Samachar said, "I have been impacted by the play. It is a best of the best experience especially for the new generation. Whatever efforts have been made towards it are truly exceptional and indescribable. This message should be taken across in not only one language, but several languages to more and more people." The 806th show of show was held at Whistling Woods International, a film institute. The play was also well received by several prisons including Tihar Jail.

The play was well received by audiences worldwide. It had its 150th show on 14 February 2017 at Tejpal auditorium to recognize surgeons, donors, recipients and institutions involved with organ donation. The play had its 200th show in March 2017. The play had its 500th show in St Albans at the Alban Arena in May 2017. The play had its 650th show at the JAINA Convention in the United States of America. The play became the first Indian and Gujarati event to be held at the Dolby Theatre in Los Angeles, California in July 2017.

== Awards and nominations ==
16th Annual Transmedia Gujarati Screen and Stage Awards 2016

- Best Drama, Mumbai
- Best Director (Stage): Rajesh Joshi
- Best Supporting Actor (Stage): Pulkit Solanki

== See also ==
- Apurva Avsar– A play on Shrimad Rajchandra
- List of artistic depictions of Mahatma Gandhi
