= Saubhagyabhai =

Pujyashri Saubhagyabhai (1823–1896) born in Sayla, Saurashtra was one of the foremost devotees of Shrimad Rajchandra. Saubhagyabhai was 67 years old when he first met Shrimad. Though Shrimad was 44 years younger than him, he declared Shrimad as his Guru and is considered as Shrimad Rajchandra's divine soulmate. The great scripture, Atmasiddhi Shastra was composed by Shrimad Rajchandra upon the request of Saubhagyabhai in 1896.

== Life ==
Saubhagyabhai was born in the Sheth family to his father Lallubhai and mother Laalmaa. Due to family feuds, they shifted from Limbdi to Sayla. Lallubhai used to serve saints with great devotion.

Saubhagbhai married Ratanba and they had two sons, Manilal and Trambak, and six daughters, Diwaliba, Zaverba, Pashiba, Chhabalba, Chanchalba and Paarvatiba.

In 1889 Saubhagyabhai went to meet Shrimad Rajchandra who welcomed him by greeting him by his name. Shrimad then asked him to open the safe which contained the reason why Saubhagyabhai had come to meet Shrimad. To test Shrimad’s knowledge further he asked Shrimad which direction the door of his house in Sayla faced. Shrimad answered correctly, which immensely astounded Saubhagyabhai. Convinced that Shrimad was an enlightened saint, He prostrated himself three times before Shrimad.

In 1896 Saubhagyabhai requested Shrimad Rajchandra to put up the subject matter of the letter on 6 fundamental truths of the soul in a poetry form, as it would be difficult to memorise the letter. Hence at this suggestion, Shrimad composed the 142 verse poetry in Gujarati called Atmasiddhi Shastra. According to the legend, when Saubhagyabha requested Shrimad, it was already night time. Shrimad composed and wrote down the verses—all 142 verses within 90 minutes.

Saubhagyabhai was able to attain a state of unprecedented Samadhi. On Thursday, Jeth Vad 10 of 1896, Saubhagyabhai left his mortal body.

== Legacy ==
Shri Raj Saubhag ashram has been named after Saubhagyabhai. The guiding philosophy of the ashram revolves around dedication and devotion to the enlightened spiritual master.
