= Curumsey Damjee =

Businesspeople from Mumbai

Rai Bahadur Curumsey Damjee (also spelled Karamsi or Kasamshi Damji) JP (1844–1918) was a noted businessman. Hailing from Waghura, a small village in remote Kutch he migrated to Bombay (now Mumbai) at a young age and became a very successful businessman, working with the Bombay Port Trust.

== Work and award ==
Damjee's company, Curumsey Damjee and Sons, was involved in work at Bombay Port. He was given the honorific title "Rao Bahadur" by the then British government in India for his good community work on 1 January 1899.

== Religion and community ==
The Curumsey Damjee Community Hall at the Dariya Sthan (Kutchi Lohana Mahajan) Masjid Bunder, Mumbai was named after him. He also co-edited a 1902 version of Bhramanand Kavya, an important Swaminarayan Scripture, written by Brahmanand Swami. A copy of this book was referred to in the Catalogue of Marathi and Gujarati books of the British Museum, Dept. of Oriental Printed Books and Manuscripts in 1915.

== Charity and scholarship ==
Damjee instituted three Public Charitable Trusts. First the R. B. Sheth Curumsey Damjee Arogya Bhuvan Trust that has a sanatorium in Matheran. Second, the R. B. Sheth Curumsey Damjee Mathura Waghora Dharamsala Trust that has a dharamsala in Waghora. Third, the R. B. Sheth Curumsey Damjee Swaminarayan Temple Charity Trust that funds various activities of the Shri Swaminarayan Mandir, Mumbai. An annual scholarship was instituted at the University of Mumbai after him. This scholarship was worth Rs. 250/- and was given to the top most student among Kutchi Lohana community.
