= Atma Siddhi =

Spiritual treatise by Shrimad Rajchandra

Information
- Religion: Jainism
- Author: Shrimad Rajchandra
- Language: Gujarati
- Period: 19th century
- Verses: 142

Atma Siddhi Shastra (Gujarati: આત્મસિદ્ધિ) is a spiritual treatise in verse, composed in Gujarati by the nineteenth century Jain saint, philosopher poet Shrimad Rajchandra (1867–1901). Atma according to Jainism means "soul" or the "self" and "siddhi" means "attainment". Hence, Atma Siddhi is translated as self attainment or self realization. It is a composition of 142 verses in Gujarati, explaining the fundamental philosophical truths about the soul and its liberation. It propounds six fundamental truths on soul which are also known as satapada (six steps).

The author, Shrimad Rajchandra, lays special emphasis on right perception (samyaktva), self-efforts and a true teacher's guidance on the path to self-realisation. Although it is in poetry form, it is also known as Atma-siddhi Shastra as it enjoys a near-canonical status amongst the followers of Shrimad Rajchandra.

== Author ==
Atmasiddhi was composed by the nineteenth century Jain mystic poet Shrimad Rajchandra (1867–1901 C.E.). His full name was Raichandbhai Ravjibhai Mehta. He was born in Vavania Bandar, a village in Saurashtra, Gujarat. He is said to have experienced Jatismarana Jnana (knowledge of previous lives) at the age of seven years in 1874 CE while observing a dead body being cremated.

Although he died at an age of 33 years, he produced a vast amount of spiritual literature in the forms of letters, poems and books. He was also highly regarded by Mahatma Gandhi. Gandhi records in his autobiography that he was very impressed with him who answered his questions related to spirituality with patience and conviction. Gandhi also read religious and spiritual books recommended to him by Shrimad Rajchandra.

== Background ==
=== Letter ===
Lalluji Maharaj, one of the devotees of Shrimad, was very ill and asked for Shrimad's counsel on samadhi marana, that is, peaceful death by meditation. In reply, Shrimad wrote the famous letter (also known as chha padno patra) dated 31–3–1888, propounding six fundamental truths, and inspired Lalluji Maharaj not to fear death. This letter is the basis out of which Atmasiddhi was developed. Lalluji Maharaj appreciates this letter as follows:

This letter has helped us to remove all our stray ideas and wandering thoughts. It has removed our doubts, confirmed our faith in the fundamentals of Jainism and those of all religions in general, namely the nature and development of soul.

=== Six fundamental truths ===
Shrimad enunciates the six fundamental truths in the letter. He calls them as six pada or six spiritual steps:

1. Self (soul) exists
2. It is permanent and eternal
3. It is the doer of its own actions
4. It is the enjoyer or the sufferer of its actions
5. Liberation (salvation) exists
6. There is a way to achieve liberation.

Shrimad further notes that:

Here I have briefly shown these six steps propounded by all-knowing saints—the steps which are the principal residence of Samyak darshan or right vision (enlightenment) of Jiva (soul). They are worthy of being proved most effective and helpful to a soul very near to its liberation in his natural thinking and reflection. He can very easily see that these six steps are the highest decisions of the human Soul. If these steps are well followed then they can easily give birth to a fine discrimination (discriminative knowledge on what is right and wrong) in the human Soul. These six steps are totally true or correct, beyond all possible doubt, and this is indicated by the very high person, Bhagawan Mahavira. The discrimination of these six steps has been given by him to help a Jiva (Self) to rightly understand and realise his own forms and nature. This direction of six steps is shown by all knowing great saints with a view to help a Jiva to shake-off its ego, developed by its suffering in its beginningless deluded state, and its strong feeling of mine and thine and so to be completely free from it. If the Jiva realises that its real nature is free from this dream state, then in a moment it wakes up and achieves Samyak darshan or right vision or perception and attaining right vision, it can quickly obtain liberation as its own real nature. Then it would not experience either joy or sorrow on account of contact with any perishable or impure object or bhava (passion.)

=== Composition of the poem ===
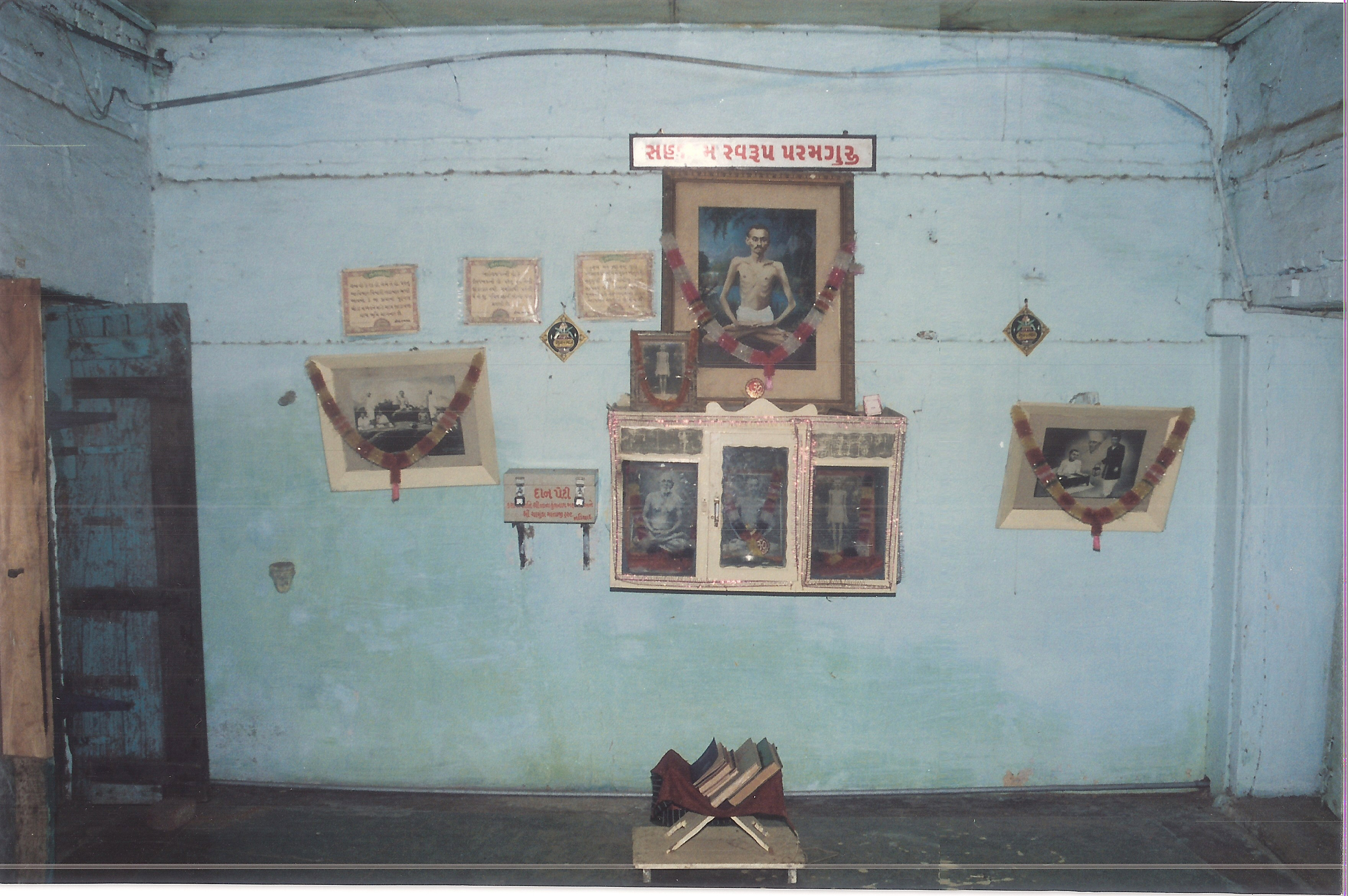
The room where Atma Siddhi was composed

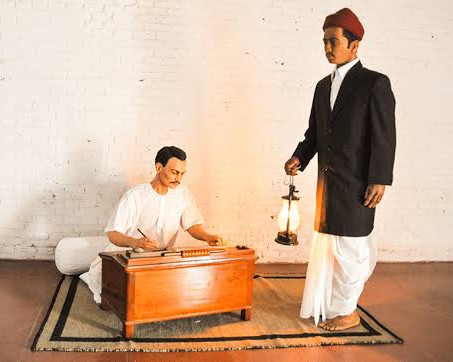
The statues of Shrimad Rajchandra and Ambalal erected in Nadiad Ashram commemorating composition of Atma Siddhi

At Nadiad, Kheda district of Gujarat, one of the disciple of Shrimad, Sobhagyabhai requested him to put up the subject matter of the letter in a poetry form, as it would be difficult to memorise the letter. Hence at this suggestion, Shrimad composed the 142 verse poetry in Gujarati called Atma-siddhi. According to the legend, when Sobhagyabhai requested Shrimad, it was already night time. Hence, when Shrimad composed and wrote down the verses—all 142 verses within 90 minutes—his another disciple Ambalal stood with a lantern in hand while Shrimad was writing. He then instructed Ambalal to make out four copies of the manuscript and give one copy each to his disciples; Sobhagyabhai, Ambalal himself, Lalluji Maharaj and Zaveri Maneklal Ghelabhai. He instructed Lalluji to study and reflect upon the Atmasiddhi in solitude.

== Influences ==
By propounding the six fundamental truths or steps, Shrimad basically summarized what ancient Jain philosophers had been saying in various texts. Shrimad had studied various Jain scriptures and many great books written by Jain Acharyas. The background to his philosophy of six steps lies in one particular verse in a book called Adhyatma-saar by 17th century Jain philosopher-monk Yasovijaya which says:

Nasti, na nityo, na karta

na bhokta na cha nivrutah

Tadupayascha netyaahuh

mithyatvasya padani sat

Which means: “(To believe that) There is no soul, it is not eternal, it is not the author, it is not the sufferer, there is no liberation and there is no path to achieve the salvation are the six steps of faithlessness".

The 8th century Acarya Kundakunda had also mentioned about the soul in a slightly different manner but he had said “- Soul does good or bad actions and enjoys (or suffers from) the fruits of them". Shrimad has also said this same thing in his 3rd and 4th statements. Another Jain monk Nemichandra says in his Dravyasamgraha:

The sentient substance (soul) is characterized by the function of understanding, is incorporeal, performs actions (doer), is co-extensive with its own body. It is the enjoyer (of its actions), located in the world of rebirth (or) emancipated (liberated) (and) has the intrinsic movement upwards.

— Dravyasamgraha—2

== Contents and overview ==
Atma Siddhi is a philosophical poetry of 142 verses that explains the fundamental philosophical truths about the soul and its liberation. Srimad first discusses the correct and the false religious approach. He then goes on to discuss the characteristics of the false believer and the true seeker of self. Then, he propounds the six fundamental truths of the soul and in the second part clarifies each fundamental truth. The discussion on the nature of the fundamental truth is in the form of a disciple's doubt and clarification given by the enlightened teacher. In the last part, the disciple is enlightened and shows his devotion to his guru. The last chapter concludes by clarifying important Jain concepts.

=== Sections of Shri Atmasiddhi Shastra ===
Shri Atmasiddhi Shastra has 142 Gathas which are divided into twelve sections. Each verse, seamlessly meshing into the other and has a connection with the previous verse and the next verse.

12 SECTIONS OF SHRI ATMASIDDHI SHASTRA

| Sr.No | Verses | Topic |
| 1 | 1 to 23 | Introduction |
| 2 | 24 to 33 | Attributes of the Bigot |
| 3 | 34 to 42 | Attributes of the seeker of Self-Realisation |
| 4 | 43,44 | Naming of the Six Fundamentals |
| 5 | 45 to 58 | First Fundamental - Soul Exists |
| 6 | 59 to 70 | Second Fundamental -Soul is Eternal |
| 7 | 71 to 78 | Third Fundamental - Soul is the Doer |
| 8 | 79 to 86 | Fourth Fundamental - Soul is the Receiver |
| 9 | 87 to 91 | Fifth Fundamental -There is Liberation |
| 10 | 92 to 118 | Sixth Fundamental - There is a Path to Liberation |
| 11 | 119 to 127 | Expression of Disciple's enlightenment |
| 12 | 128 to 142 | Conclusion |

=== Part 1 ===
==== Chapter I: Religious approach – Right and wrong ====
There are 23 stanzas in this chapter that provide an introduction to the religious approach. This chapter begins with admission of ignorance by the disciple while venerating the Guru. It begins with this verse:

As real self I never knew, So suffered I eternal pain,

I bow to Him my master true, Who preached and broke eternal chain.

— Atmasiddhi– 1.1

Srimad notes that some people indulge simply in mindless rituals while others are only pedantic without any action—both believing theirs as the only true path. This chapter also discusses the absolute necessity of having an enlightened Guru and characteristics of such Guru. Accordingly, neither the contemplation of self nor state of omniscience can be achieved without the existence of a true living guru. This departs slightly with the traditional Jain belief (See Tattvarthasutra 1.3) that enlightenment can be achieved either through self on its own or through instrumentality of guru or scriptures.

==== Chapter II: Characteristics of a religious bigot ====
Verses 24 to 33 discuss the characteristics of a bigot and a sectarian. Such people select false gurus and confine themselves to external characteristics of the Jina. They are unable to recognise enlightened teacher and adopt a staunchly sectarian attitude. They sometimes gather knowledge but do not act on it.

==== Chapter III: The Characteristics of a true seeker of Self ====
Verses 34 to 42 discuss the attributes of a true seeker of self. True seekers are those who are engaged in gaining self-realization. They are called Atmarthi, which literally means one who seeks well-being of his soul A true seeker seeks out a true guru and obeys his commands. He calms down his passions, aspires for liberation and has compassion for all living beings.

==== Chapter IV: The Statement of the Six Fundamental Truths ====
The two verses 43 and 44 state and explain the Satpada that literally means six steps (towards liberation). It is explained in the verse 43 :

Atma chhe te nitya chhe, chhe karta neejkarma Chhe bhokta vali moksha chhe, Moksha upay sudharma.

— Atmasiddhi – 4.43

Which is translated as : "Soul exists, it is eternal, it is a doer of its karma, it is an enjoyer and sufferer of its karma, liberation exists and means to liberation exists; all these constitute true religion".

=== Part II ===
In Part II, the disciple expresses doubt on each of the six steps, which are answered by the enlightened teacher.

==== Chapter I: Existence of the Self (Soul) ====
The verses 45 to 58 of this chapter explains the disciple's doubts on the existence of the soul and the gurus clarification as to why the soul exists. The pupil raises the following arguments: The soul cannot be seen, it has no form, it is not experienced, it is not same as body, senses, or breath, there is no separate sign of its existence and it cannot be seen like a pot or a cloth. Hence the pupil concludes the soul does not exist and so there is no question of bondage or liberation. The guru explains that the soul and body seems to be the same because of the embodiment of soul, but this is an illusion and both are different like a sword and its sheath. That which sees, recognises form and retains experience is soul. The eyes and other senses are tools and collectively the soul obtains knowledge from the senses. The guru explains that the body does not know, neither do the senses nor does the breath. The knowing capacity exists on account of presence of the soul. Even in various states (sitting, walking, sleeping etc.) the awareness and knowing capacity of the soul does not vanish. Guru points out that the since the knower knows the object like pots and pans, this knower is soul itself. There may be sharp intellect of frail body and poor intellect of healthy body. This cannot happen if soul and body are the same. Similarly, consciousness and non-living differ and cannot be the same. Finally the guru points out the irony of the question—to question whether the self exists, that itself proves the existence of self.

==== Chapter II: Permanence or eternity of the Self ====
The verses 59 to 70 pertain to the disciples doubt regarding permanence to the soul and the gurus explanation as to why the soul is eternal. Although the pupil is convinced on the soul's existence, he notes that the soul emerges at the time of the birth and gets destroyed at the time of the death. Furthermore, since change occurs continuously and nothing is permanent—this also applies to the soul. Hence it is difficult to believe that soul is eternal and permanent. The guru explains that the body is merely a non-sentient form and hence cannot determine the birth and death of sentience. The knowledge of the birth and death of the body can only be experienced by the soul if it is separate from the body. A lifeless matter cannot turn into or give birth to life or consciousness, nor can sentience turn itself into non-living. This that which cannot be created by matter and has always existed has to be eternal. The guru also infers that the anger etc. of the animals like snakes is derived from the previous birth which also proves the eternity of soul. The guru also poses the question—since substances only change form and are never destroyed then what happens to soul when it gets destroyed? It is the body that undergoes change like old age and death, not the underlying substance, that is, the soul which is not destroyed.

==== Chapter III: The Self is the author of its actions ====
The disciples doubt regarding self as the author of its actions (karma) and guru's explanation is discussed in verses 71 to 78. Disciple believes that actions itself may be influenced by past karmas or it may simply be the nature of the soul to attract karma. Alternatively, God may be influencing the actions and karma or the actions may be influenced by the nature. Guru notes that, by observation, it can be seen that lifeless matter cannot inspire action, only consciousness does. Since action needs inspiration from consciousness, karma is neither self-inspired nor the property of the soul, nor inspired by God. If karma were to be influenced by God, then god himself would be subject to impurity (of actions, good and bad). Thus it is the soul who is the doer of its actions.

==== Chapter IV: The Soul is enjoyer and sufferer of its actions ====
The verses 79 to 86 discuss the disciple's doubt on whether the soul itself is the enjoyer and sufferer of the consequences and the gurus clarification on the same. The disciple is convinced on the soul as the doer of its karma but doubts that soul bears the consequence of its actions as the karma is a lifeless and unintelligent entity and hence cannot influence consciousness. Disciple also notes other views that God dispenses karma and regulates the world. But since God does not influence the karma, it cannot bear fruit and hence soul does not bear its consequences. The guru notes that poison and nectar bear result even though both are lifeless and unintelligent. Similarly, the soul also bears the result of its karma, even though the karma is lifeless. One is born a king and another a pauper–that cannot be without a cause, indicating existence of karma. Since, Karma fructifies on its own and passes away after it bears its consequences, necessity of God as dispenser of justice is done away with.

==== Chapter V: The Soul can be liberated ====
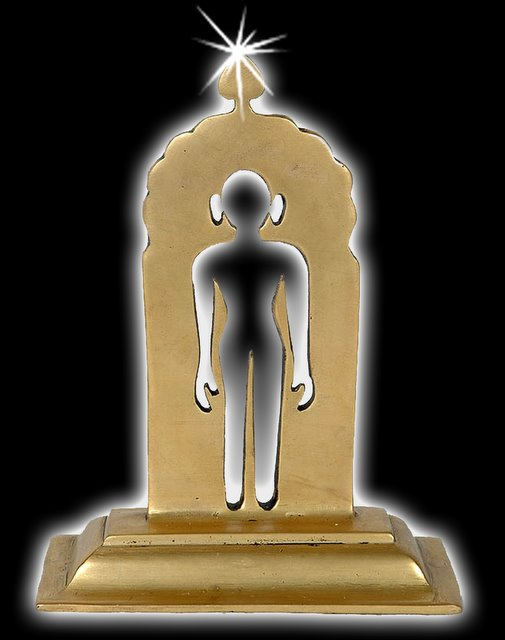
Image of a Siddha: the soul who attains Moksa; although the Siddhas (the liberated beings) are formless and without a body, this is how the Jain temples often depict the Siddhas.

The verses 87 to 91 discuss the capacity of soul to attain liberation. The pupil is now convinced that soul is the enjoyer and sufferer of its karma but doubts whether it is possible to destroy all the karmas and attain liberation. The disciple feels that infinite time has passed since the soul is in bondage with karma, but it still keeps on acquiring new karmas. It will enjoy the pleasures of heavens by doing good deeds and suffer the hells due to its bad deeds; in either case the acquisition of karma (good and bad) continues. Hence liberation is impossible. The guru explains that just as existence of (good and bad ) karmas give their result, the same way absence of karma also gives its result, which is, liberation. The good and bad karmas since infinity is nothing but good and bad modes of the soul, which when uprooted results in liberation.

==== Chapter VI: There is a path of liberation ====
The verses 92 to 118 discuss the path to liberation and qualities of true seeker of knowledge. The pupil notes that there are so many religious paths and creed that it is difficult to understand which path leads to salvation. The disciple notes that the knowledge of soul and karma is useless unless we know the path to liberation. The disciple then concludes that he was satisfied with the replies to his first five doubts and he would feel fortunate if guru dispels his last doubt on the true path of liberation. The guru propounds that the karma results in ignorance which is darkness. This darkness can be destroyed by light of knowledge. Knowledge of self is liberation. The path that uproots the causes of bondage of karma and embodiment is the path of liberation. The path of liberation lies in destroying craving, aversion and ignorance, which are knots of karmic bondage. Out of infinite types of karma, there are eight main types of Karma, out of which mohaniya karma (deluding karma) is the principal karma to be destroyed. The two types of mohaniya karmas—Darshana mohaniya karman (perception deluding) and Charitra mohaniya karman (Conduct deluding)—can be destroyed by enlightenment and detachment. In the same way the karma arising out of anger can be destroyed by forgiveness. Since this is observable, there cannot be any doubt about it. Thus anyone who gives up strong opinions and viewpoints about various ideologies and follows the path enumerated above will attain liberation after a very few births.

=== Part III (Conclusion) ===
The part three ends Atmasiddhi with enlightenment of the disciple. He now understands the six fundamental steps. He is grateful to his guru and sings extolment and praise of his guru. Srimad then concludes by describing true teacher, true seeker and true religion.

=== Receivers of the Atmasiddhi Shastra ===
Shrimad considering only four persons as eligible, had given four copies of Shri Atmasiddhi Shastra made by Shri Ambalalbhai. One copy was sent to Shri Saubhagbhai in Sayla, one to Shri Lalluji Muni in Khambhat, one to Shrimadji's business partner Shri Maneklal Ghelabhai Jhaveri in Rangoon, and one for Shri Ambalalbhai himself. In this way, four people were given copies to read and reflect upon and along with that, they were instructed not to publicly mention Shri Atmasiddhi Shastra.This text was not published during Shrimad's lifetime and therefore very few people even knew about it.

== Commentaries and translations ==
| No. | Publication yer | Work | Author | Language |
| 1 | 1943 | Shri Atmasiddhi Shasra Para Pravchano | Kanji Swami | Gujarati, Hindi |
| 2 | 1961 | Shrimad Rajchandra pranita Atmasiddhi Shastra ( Visesartha Sahita) | Bhogilal G. Sheth | Gujarati |
| 3 | 1986 | Hun Atma Chhun | Tarulatabai Mahasati | Gujarati, Hindi, English |
| 4 | 1992 | Shrimad Rajchandra Pranita Atmasiddhi Shastra (Rajjyoti Mahabhasya) | Bhagwandas Mehta | Gujarati |
| 5 | 2001 | Atmasiddhi Shastra Vivechan | Rakesh Jhaveri | Gujarati |
| 6 | 2006 | In Search of the Soul | Chandrika | English |
| 7 | 2009 | Atmasiddhi Shastra Mahabhasya | Jayantilalji | Gujarati |
| 8 | 2011 | Atmasiddhi Shastra Pravchan Mala | Bhuvanvijayji | Gujarati |
| 9 | 2021 | Shri Atmasiddhi Shastra: Six Spiritual Truths of the Soul | Rakesh Jhaveri | English |
| 10 | 2024 | Soul Verses: Atmasiddhi in English (Sung, rhyming translation) | Ashik Shah + Paarul Shah | English |

== Memorial ==
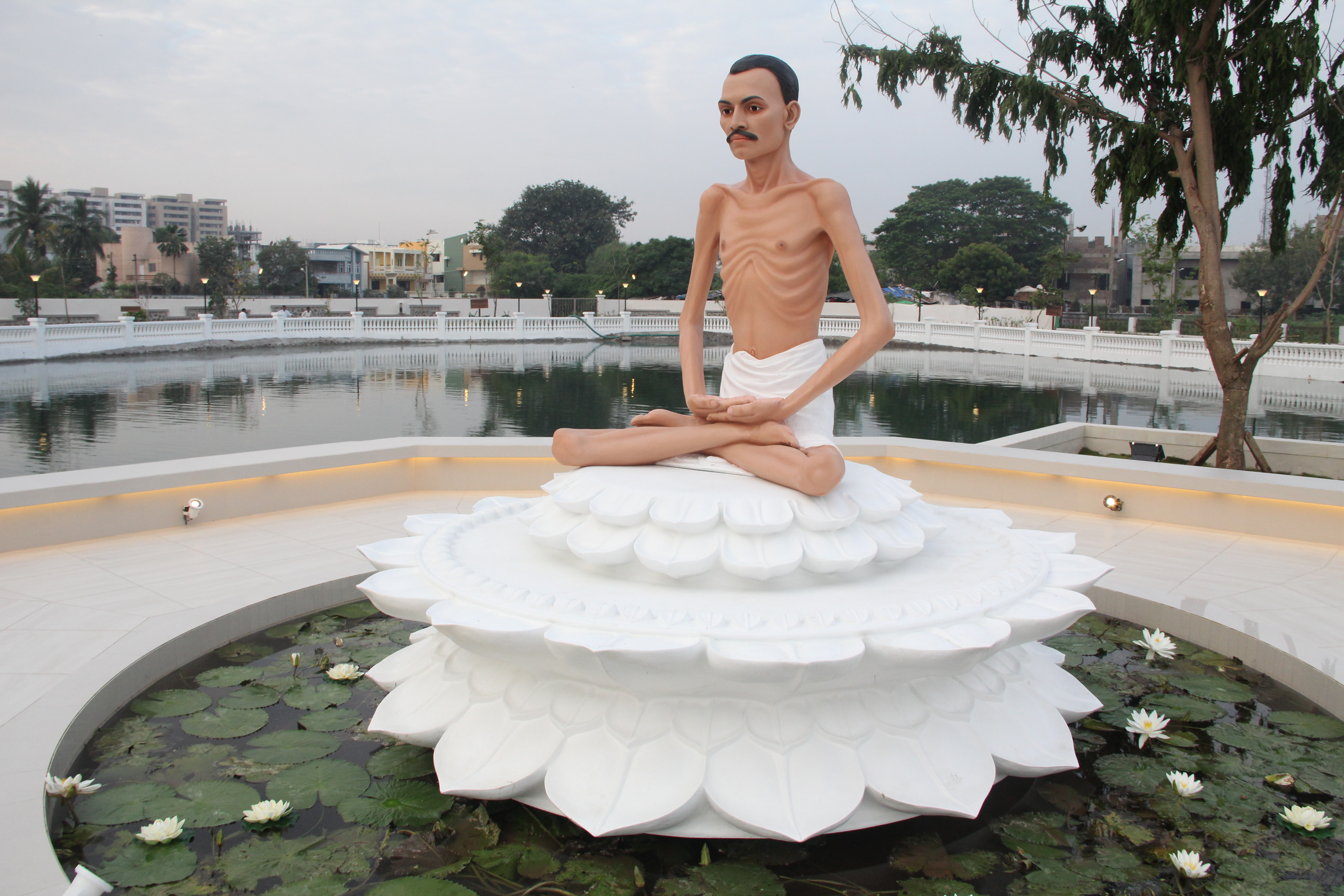
A statue of Shrimad Rajchandra on a white lotus at the center of the lake

Shri Atmasiddhishastra Rachnabhoomi is a memorial that stands at the site of the creation of Atmasiddhi Shastra in Nadiad. It has been restored by Shrimad Rajchandra Mission Dharampur preserving the original brick wall. Life-sized statues of Shrimad Rajchandra and Ambalalbhai have been placed in the room, in the same stance as when the scripture was penned. Shrimad Rajchandra Mission Dharampur also beautified the lake and consecrated a 5'3" idol of Shrimad Rajchandra in the centre. A walking track has been constructed around the lake for the community and visitors.

== See also ==
- Causes of Karma
- Dharma (Jainism)
- Jain Agamas
- Nirvana (Jainism)
- Types of Karma
