= Vavaniya =

Coordinates: 23°00′25″N 70°36′35″E

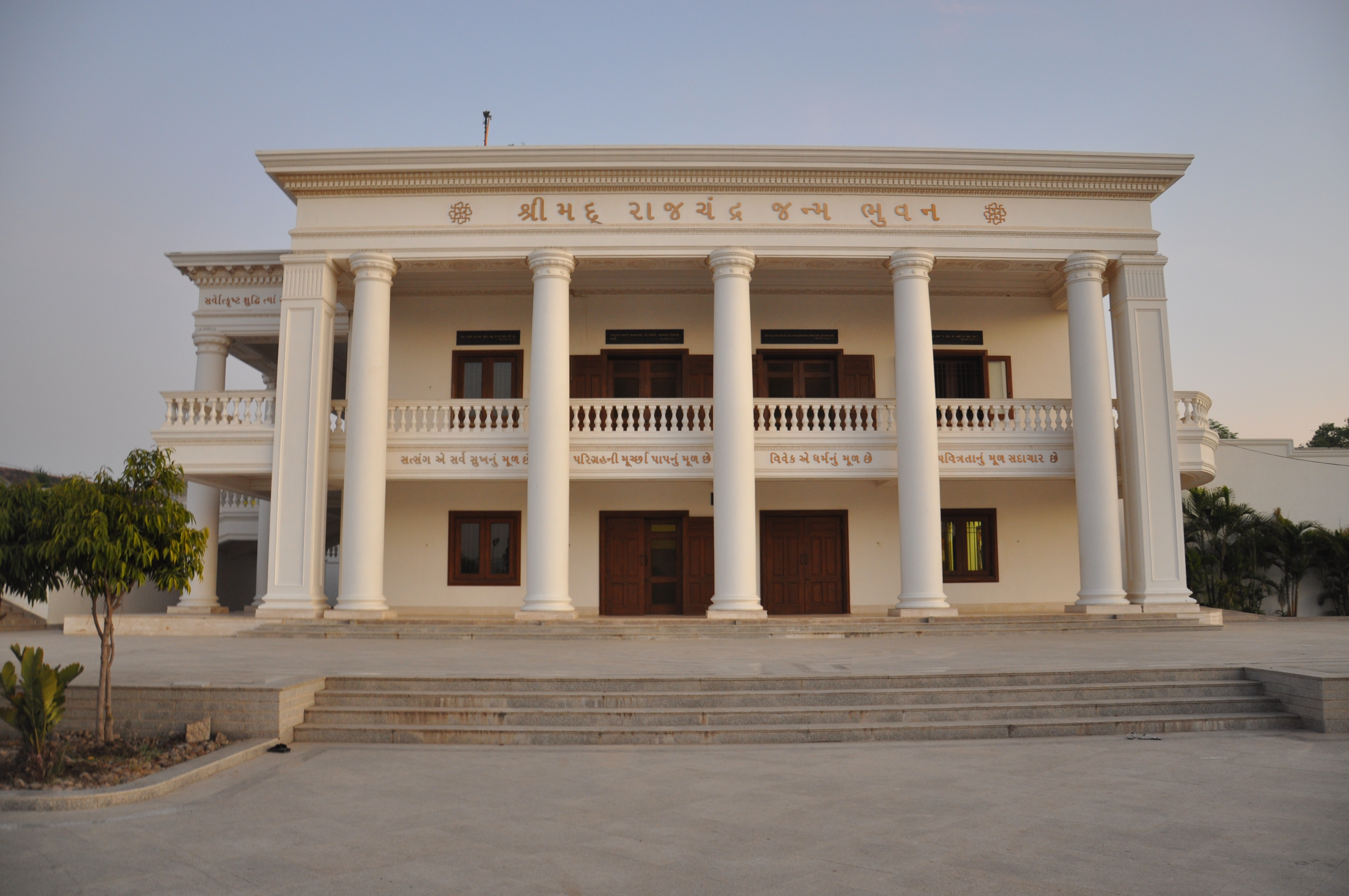
Shrimad Rajchandra Janmabhuvan, Vavaniya

Vananiya is a small village located 40 km from the town of Morbi in the state of Gujarat, India.

== Population and census details ==
Vavaniya's local language is Gujarati. The total population is 4356 and number of houses are 847. The percentage of females is 47.6% while the literacy rate is 44.4%. It is 30 km from the Arabian Sea. Vavania is 226 kilometers from Ahmedabad, Gujarat, on NH947.

== Places of interest ==
Shrimad Rajchandra Janma Bhuvan is a hall built commemorating the place of birth of Shrimad Rajchandra, a Jain saint and philosopher of the late 19th century renowned for being the spiritual guru of Mahatma Gandhi. It is visited by devotees of Rajchandra.

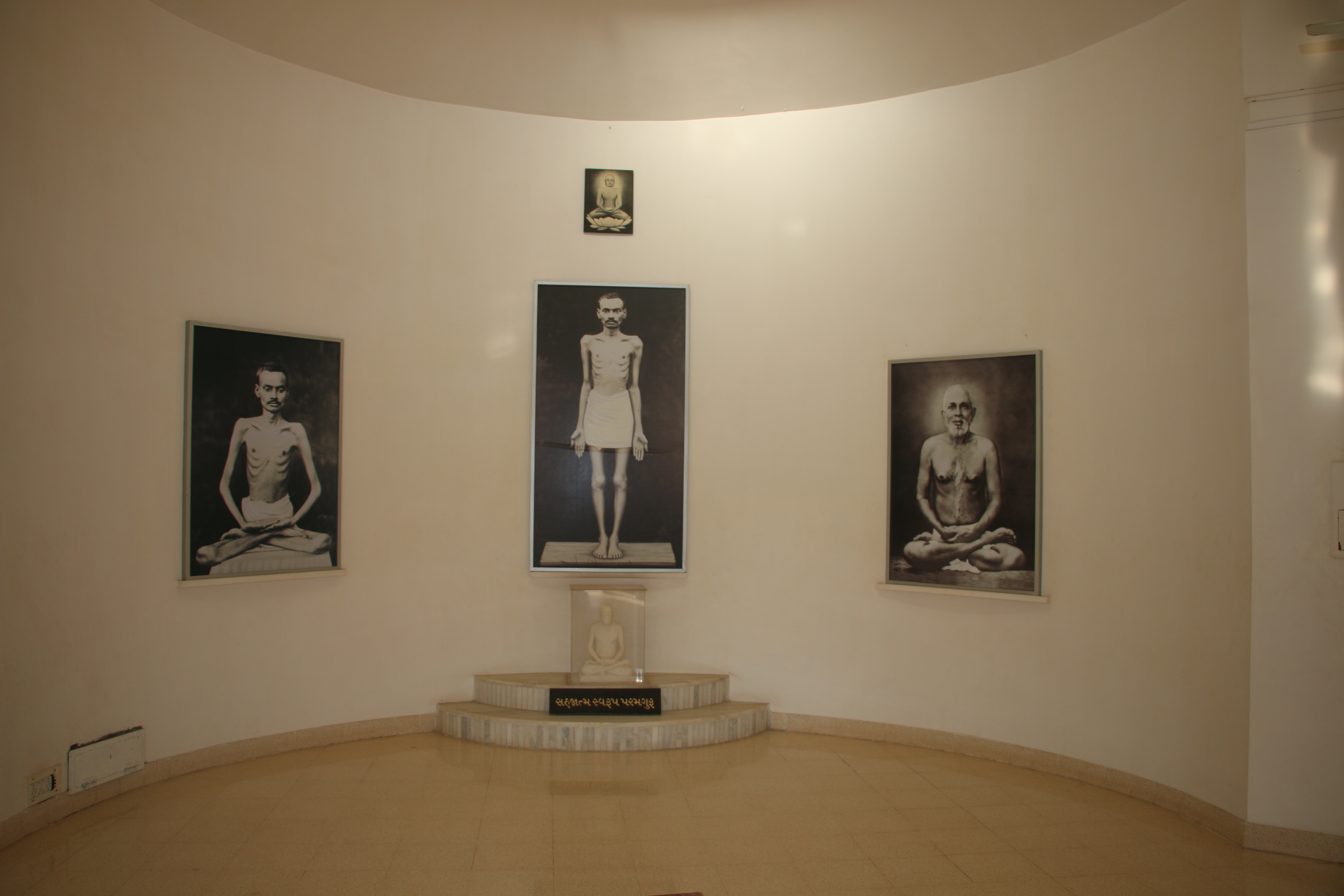
Inside Shrimad Rajchandra Janmabhuvan
