= Shri Swaminarayan Mandir, Mumbai =

Shri Swaminarayan Mandir
- श्री स्वामीनारायण मंदिर
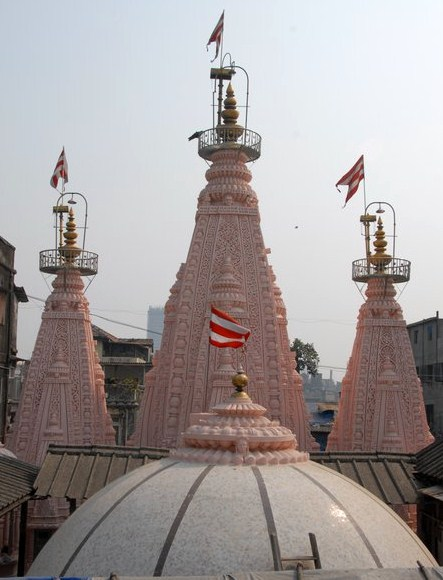
- The Three Spires and dome of the Sabha Mandap atop the temple

- Location within Mumbai

Religion
- Affiliation: Hinduism
- District: Mumbai City
- Deity: Laxminarayan Dev, Gaullok Vihari Maharaj

Location
- Location: Mumbai
- State: Maharashtra
- Country: India
- Interactive map of Shri Swaminarayan Mandir
- Coordinates: 18°57′14.31″N 72°49′48.78″E

Architecture
- Creator: Swaminarayan Sampraday
- Completed: 1868

Shri Swaminarayan Mandir, Mumbai (Marathi: श्री स्वामीनारायण मंदिर, मुंबई) is a Hindu temple (Mandir) and a part of the Swaminarayan Sampraday. This Swaminarayan Temple is located in the Bhuleshwar area of Mumbai and is the oldest Swaminarayan Mandir in Mumbai, being over a hundred years old.

The present Mandir has a tri - spire structure and the Murtis installed are that of Laxminarayan Dev with Ghanshyam Maharaj, and Radha Krishna Dev with Hari Krishna Maharaj. In this temple, Radha Krishna are worshipped in the form of Radha Golokvihari as they are the residents of Goloka. It is a Shikharband Mandir and comes under the Laxminarayan Dev Gadi (Vadtal). This temple is one of many in the Bhuleshwar area that led to the birth of Phool Galli (or flower market) in Bhuleshwar due to the high demand of flowers in these temples.

== History ==
On Vaishakh Shukla Ekadashi, 1868, Ranchhoddas Pranjeevandas built the first ever Shree Swaminarayan temple in Mumbai by breaking and rebuilding his own residence. The deities of Hari Krishna Maharaj, Gaulokvihari and Radhika were instated by Acharya Maharaj Bhagwatprasadji Maharaj.

=== Tri-spire temple ===
The present tri-spire temple structure was built and the deities of Ghanshyam Maharaj and Lakshminarayan Dev instated on the occasion of Vaishakh Shukla Dwadashi, 1903 by Acharya Maharaj Lakshmiprasadji Maharaj.

Swaminarayan's devotee, Rao Bahadur Sheth Curumsey Damjee contributed towards this temple's reinstatement with all material, physical and intellectual resources. His close associate and friend Shree Mathurdas Vaishnav too donated Rs. 25,000/- towards this work.

== Structure ==
The Swaminarayan temple at Bhuleshwar has an elaborately carved frontage which is really a visual treat in an otherwise shabby surrounding. There are twenty five steps leading to the audience hall (Sabhamandap). There are the shrines dedicated to Ganesha and Hanuman on the left and right of the audience hall. There are three main shrines. In the shrine on the east there are idols of Hari Krishna Maharaj, Gaulokvihari and Radhika; the shrine at the centre has the idols of Ghanashyam Maharaj, Narayan and Laxmi; while the shrine on the west houses the resting place for deities. Over the Sabhamandap is a dome upon which are painted the scenes from the Krishnalila (Sports of Krishna). The dome is supported by fifty four pillars. There is a big audience hall on the first floor where religious discourses are held regularly.

== Festivals ==
The festivities celebrated at the temple are Ram Navami/Swaminarayan Jayanti, Janmashtami, Vaman Jayanti, Nrisinha Jayanti, Mahashivratri, Ganesh Chaturthi, etc. Apart from these, the festival of Hindola is also celebrated as part of festivities during the month of Shravan in the Indian Calendar.

== Images ==
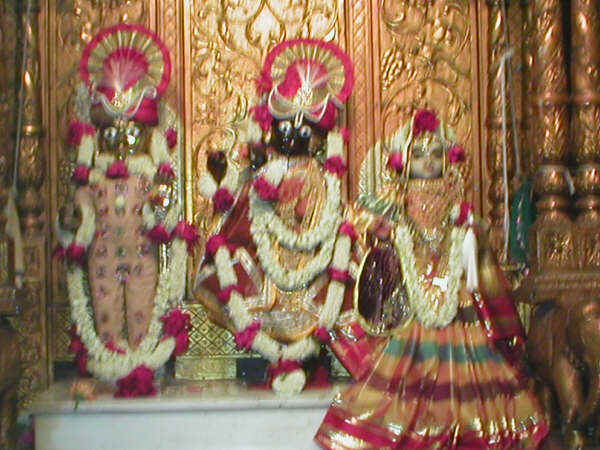
Image Hari Krishna with Gaulokvihari and Radha in the western sanctum

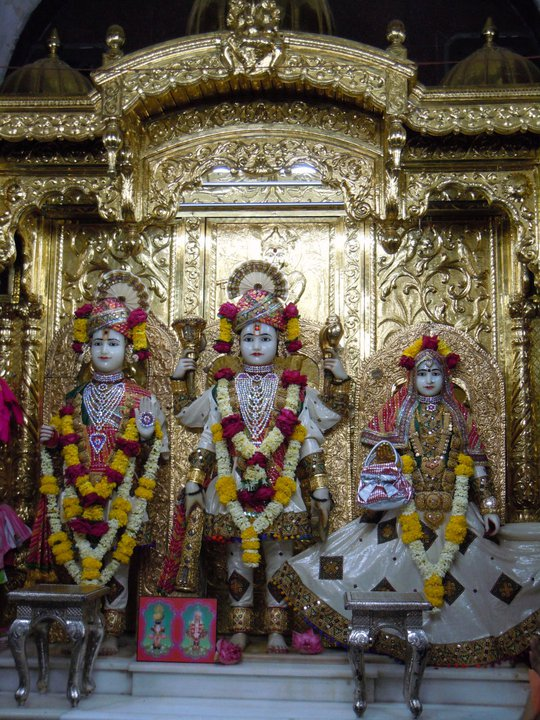
Image of Ghanshyam with Lakshmi Narayan in the central sanctum

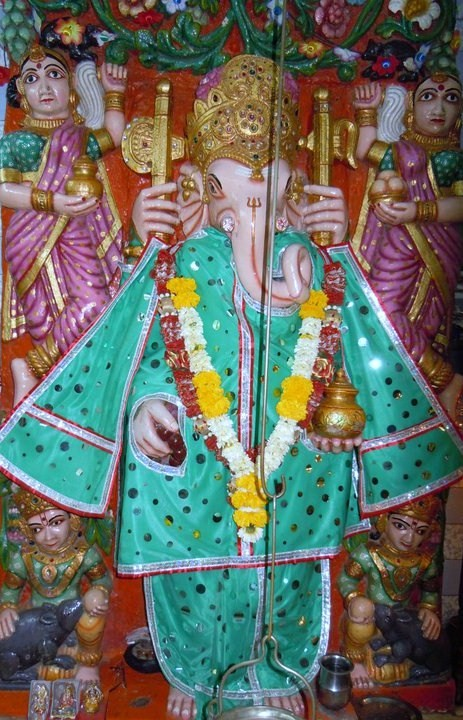
Image of Ganesha on the left of the entrance

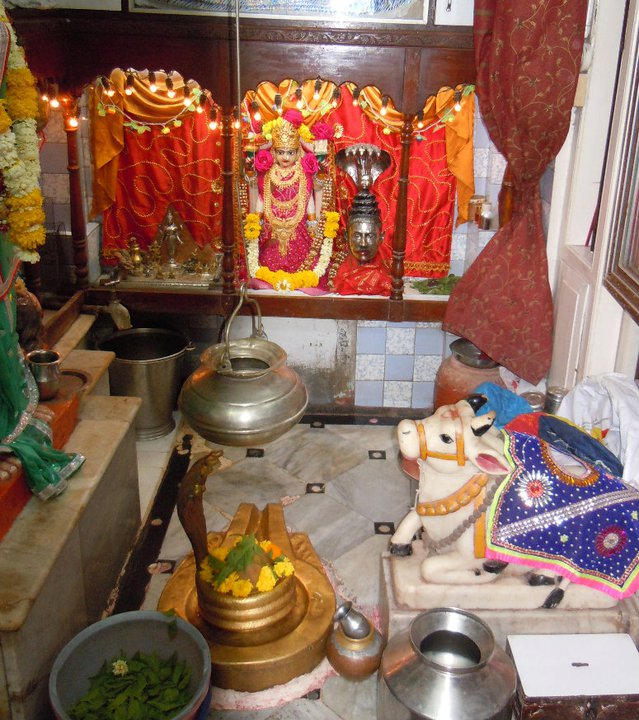
Image of the Shiv Ling at the temple

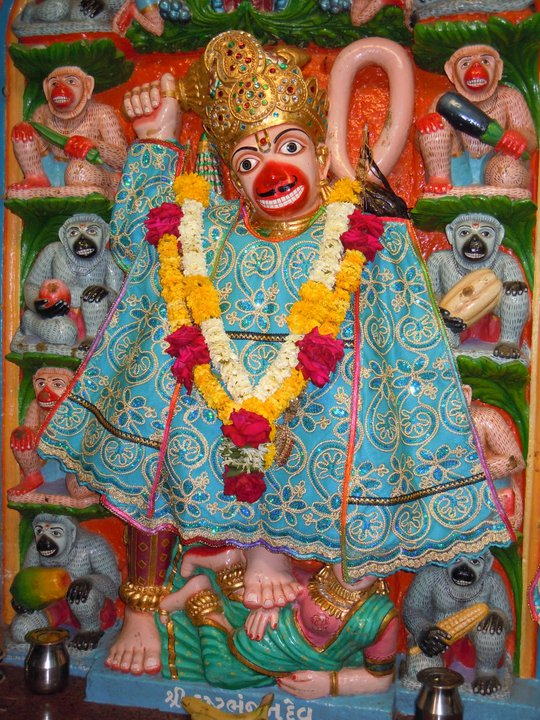
Image of Hanuman in the form of Kastbhanjan on the right of the entrance

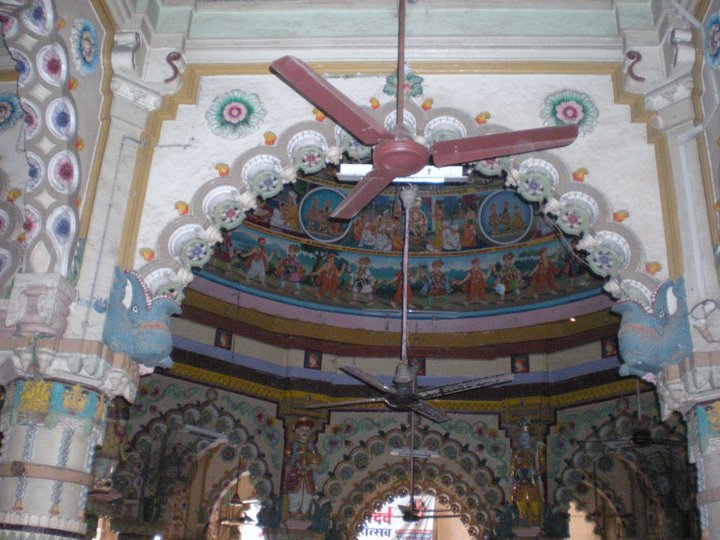
Ornately carved interior

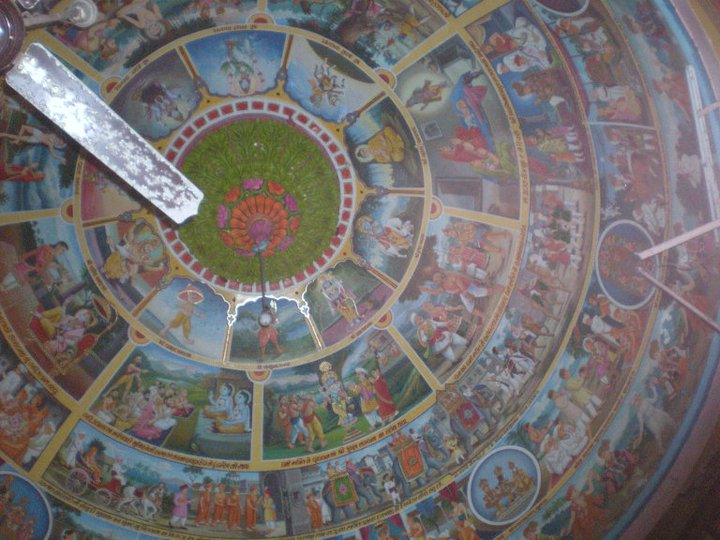
Krishna Lila on the dome of Main Sabha Mandap

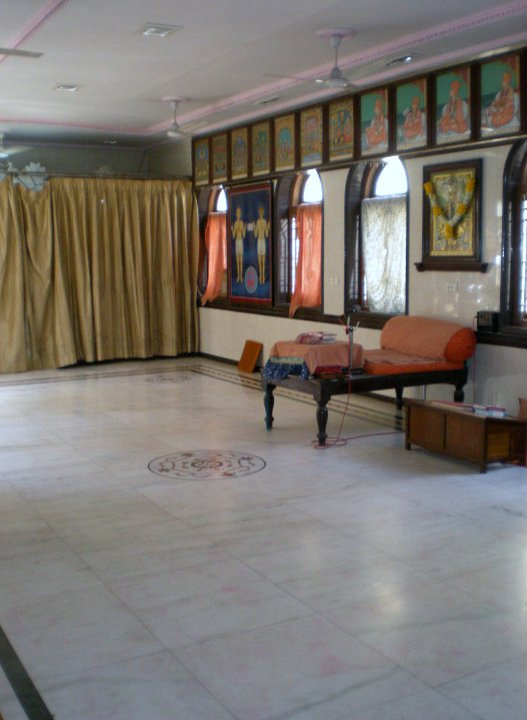
Sabha Mandap or audience hall on the first floor

== See also ==
- Swaminarayan Temples
