= Dharampur, Gujarat =

Dharampur
- Town
- Location in Gujarat, India Dharampur (India)
- Coordinates: 20.53°N 73.18°E
- Gujarat: India
- State: Gujarat
- District: Valsad
- Elevation: 74 m (243 ft)

Population (2001)
  - Total: 19,932

Languages
  - Official: Gujarati, Hindi
- Time zone: UTC+5:30 (IST)
- PIN: 396050
- Vehicle registration: GJ 15
- Website: valsad.nic.in

Dharampur is a town and municipality in the Valsad district of the Indian state of Gujarat. There are more than 100 villages associated with Dharampur (Revenue) office. Ramsingh of the Sesodia clan, the second son of Ram Raja of Udaipur, defeated the local tribal chief in the 13th century and became the ruler of Dharampur State in South Gujarat.

== Geography ==
Dharampur is located at 20.53°N 73.18°E. It has an average elevation of 75 metres (242 feet). Dharampur is a small and beautiful town situated east of Valsad. Dharampur is situated on the banks of the Swargavahini River and is surrounded by the Sahyadri or Western Ghats range on the east, west, and south. Due to its location, the town enjoys a very pleasant climate throughout the year. Dharampur is called cherrapunji of Gujarat receiving the highest rainfall in the state.

== History ==
Dharampura was originally ruled by a tribal king and chief. Dharampur, situated in south Gujarat, was the capital of the former princely State of Dharampur. It was founded in 1262 as Ramnagar and the first king of this state was Maharana Ramsinh. The present-day Dharampur dates back to 1764 and was founded by King Dharmdevji. The descendants of the Sisodia Rajputs of Chittor ruled in the history of Dharampur. After the fall of the Delhi Sultanate in south Gujarat, the State of Dharampur flourished and gained a very significant and powerful position by controlling at least seven strategic forts in the region.

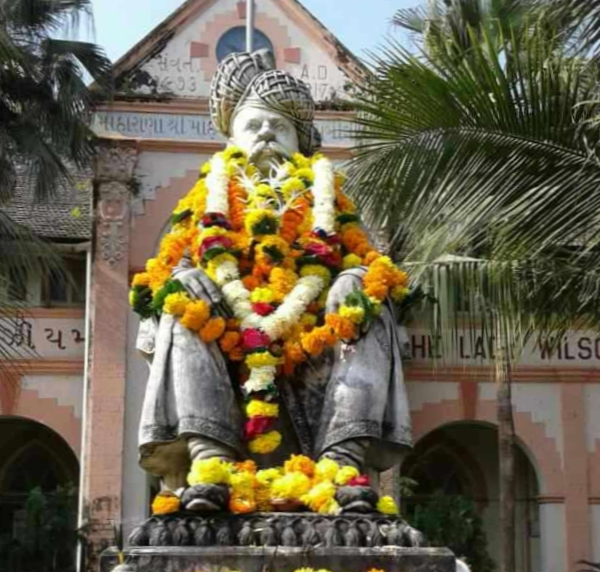
Statue of Maharana Mohandevji at Lady Wilson Museum

The Dharampur State was surrounded by the Muslim states of Khandesh, Ahmednagar, and the Sultanate of Gujarat, but because of its strategic importance, was never attacked by the Muslims. Even the 'Parsis' found political patronage under the Dharampur kings. The Dharampur kings had cordial relations with Portuguese traders from the south Gujarat ports and used to receive tax revenue from them. The City of Dharampur had two major phases of development the first in the late 18th century, when the Rana undertook the construction of Raj Mahal, public buildings, step-wells, and temples. The second phase was in the late 19th century, when as a part of the Queen Victoria Golden Jubilee celebrations, the Anglo Vernacular School, jail, and hospitals were constructed. King Mohandevji (1891–1921) studied at Rajkumar College, Rajkot, and introduced many reforms. Under his patronage, Mohan Vilas Palace, Pramod Bhavan, State guesthouse, and several temples were constructed. Roads, water tanks, and bridges were built to improve the infrastructure of the state. King Vijaydevji, on his accession to the kingdom in 1921, constructed a museum and dedicated it to Lady Wilson. Vijaydevji undertook extensive traveling to collect rare and genuine art objects for display in the museum. He was a great patron of art and music and a well-known musician, with equal command over both Indian and western classical music. He wrote a treatise on the music 'Sangeet Bhav' in six volumes, with Gujarati, Hindi, English, and French notations. He was also fond of hunting and constructed a hunting lodge at Audha and residences at Wilson Hills as summer retreats. The town has a very beautiful entrance gate (Rajya Rohan Gate) done in European style with life-size statues in Greek style adorning the top. Bandstand and gymkhana building are located, near the gate. In the old days, the State Band used to play music in the evenings for the citizens of Dharampur, at the BandStand.

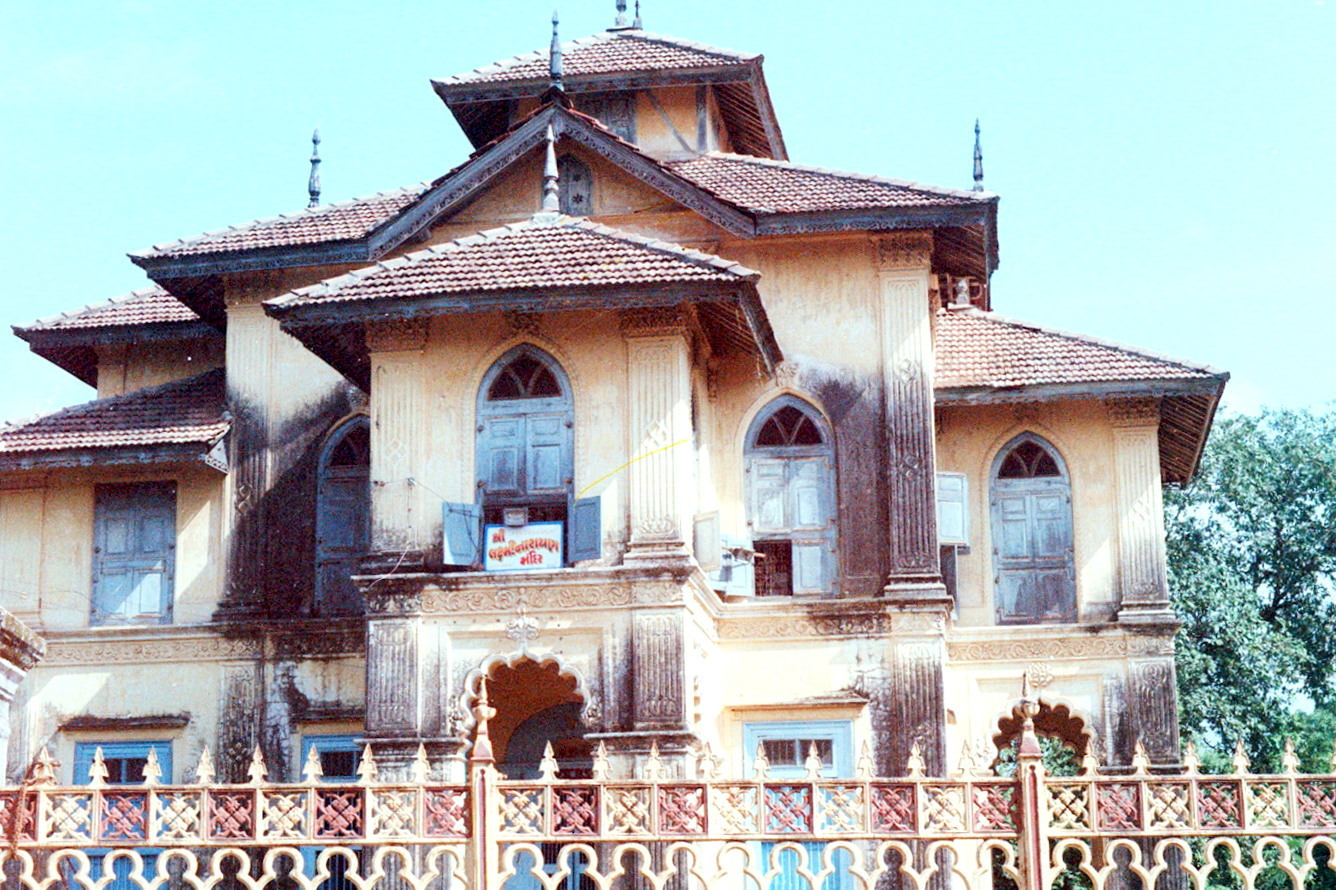
Lakshmi Temple, a classic architectural work in Dharampur, Valsad, Gujarat

In 1900, Shrimad Rajchandra had consecrated the soil of Dharampur for about 35 days (from Chaitra Sud Ekam to Vaishakh Sud Pancham, V.S. 1956). He had spent much of this time in solitude, at the crematorium, and in the surrounding jungles, immersed in spiritual bliss. Dharampur today is home to the international headquarters of the Shrimad Rajchandra Mission founded by Pujya Gurudevshri Rakesh Jhaveri.

The mission's international headquarters is located on the hillock of Mohangadh. The ashram is spread over 223 acres located on the hillock of Mohangadh.

On June 10, 1948, the ruler of Dharampur acceded to the Indian Union, and Dharampur state became part of Bombay State.

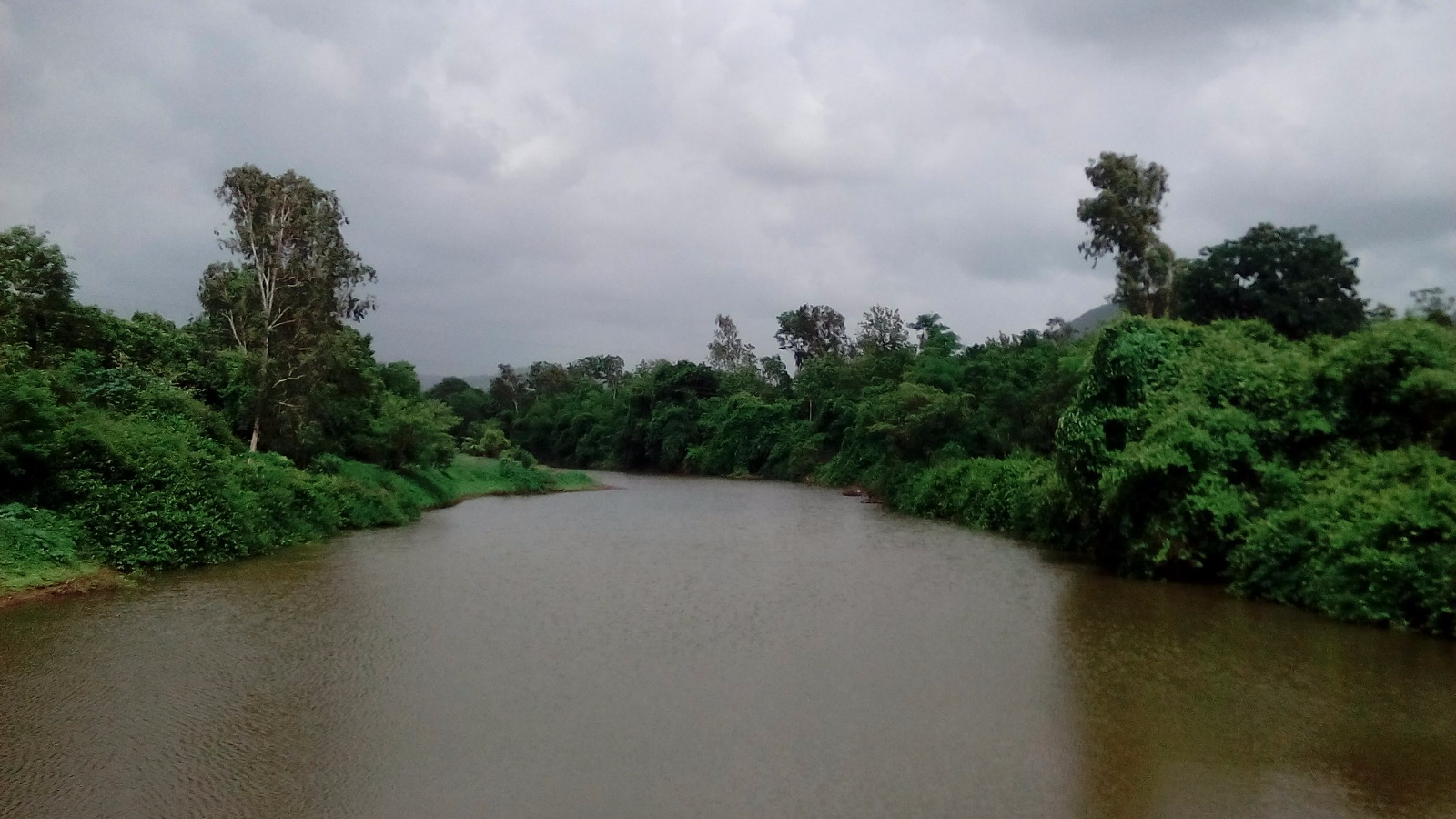
Dhamni River
