= Tribhovandas Bhimji Zaveri =

Indian jewelry company

Tribhovandas Bhimji Zaveri Ltd.
- Founded: 1864; 162 years ago
- Founder: Tribhovandas Bhimji Zaveri
- Successor: Gopaldas Tribhovandas Zaveri
- Headquarters: Zaveri Bazaar, Mumbai, India
- Number of locations: 33 (Patna, Dhanbad, Bhubaneswar, Bhopal, Jamnagar, Raipur, Ahmedabad, Bhavnagar, Rajkot, Gandhidham, Surat, Vadodara, Vapi, Jamshedpur, Kochi, Indore, Aurangabad, Mumbai, Nagpur, Pune, Thane, Vasai, Vashi, Udaipur, Vijaywada, Hyderabad, Jamshedpur, Kolkata)
- Key people: Shrikant Zaveri (Chairman & MD)
- Products: Jewellery
- Revenue: ₹8.8 billion (US$100 million) (2010)
- Website: tbztheoriginal.com

Tribhovandas Bhimji Zaveri Ltd. (TBZ) is a noted Indian jeweller and jewellery retail chain based in India. Established in 1864 by Tribhovandas Bhimji Zaveri in Zaveri Bazaar, the jewellery district of Mumbai, it was subsequently headed by his son, Gopaldas Tribhovandas Zaveri, and now Shrikant Zaveri, is the present chairman and managing director of the group. The company today, has 37 showrooms in 23 cities across eleven states, including Jaipur, Mumbai, Surat, Kochi, Bhopal, Hyderabad, Kolkata, and Rajkot The company proposed an Initial Public Offer (IPO) in July 2011.

In 2019, TBZ signed in Sara Ali Khan as their official brand ambassador.

== Overview ==
The company has 37 showrooms under "Tribhovandas Bhimji Zaveri" brand (32 company owned 5 franchise), for gold jewellery and diamond studded jewellery. Apart from that it has two designer boutiques under "Krsala", where its sells jadau and diamond-studded jewellery. Its main showroom at Zaveri Bazaar in Mumbai is built across five floors and said to be the largest jewellery showroom in India., while its other Mumbai branches are in Opera House, Churchgate, Borivali, Ghatkopar, and Santacruz. It operates stores in Jaipur, Dhanbad, Hyderabad, Kolkata, Trivandrum, Vijayawada, Ahmedabad, Surat, Kochi, Indore, Thane, Raipur, Jamshedpur, Bhopal, Jamnagar, Sambhaji Nagar, and Udaipur.

Its manufacturing unit for diamond studded jewellery is located in Kandivali in Mumbai.

== History ==
In 2011, TBZ entered the men's jewellery segment, with its Gentlemen's Collection in gold and diamonds. Previously in the January of the same year, it filed a draft red herring prospectus (DRHP) for an initial public offering with market regulator SEBI, to sell 16.66 million shares of ₹10 each.

== See also ==
- 1987 Opera House heist – It was executed in headquarters of TBZ on 19 March 1987.
- Bhima Jewellers
