= Rakesh Jhaveri =

Jain cleric and author

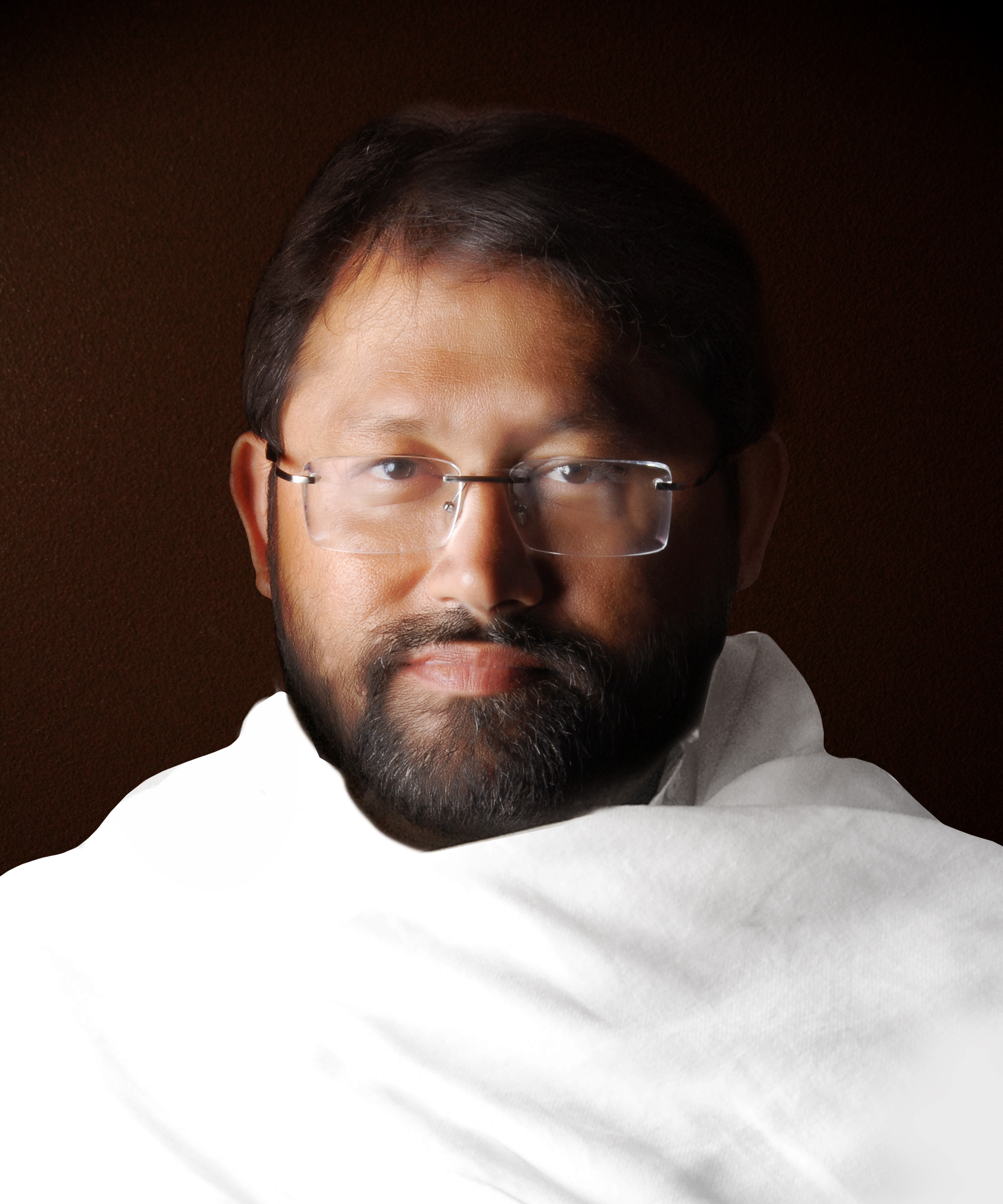
- Born: 26 September 1966 (age 59); Mumbai, Maharashtra, India
- Education: MA, PhD, DD
- Alma mater: Osmania University, University of Mumbai

Rakesh Jhaveri (born 26 September, 1966), is an Indian spiritual leader, Jain scholar, author, and speaker who follows the teachings of Shrimad Rajchandra and completed his doctoral studies on Shrimad's work: Atmasiddhi. Jhaveri founded The Shrimad Rajchandra Mission at Dharampur, which supports spiritual and social activities.

== Early life and education ==
On the 26th of September 1966, Jhaveri was born in Mumbai, India to Dilip and Rekha Jhaveri. His parents were followers of the Shwetambara Murtipujaka tradition and were influenced by monk, Sahaj Anandji (founder of The Shrimad Rajchandra Ashram at Hampi).

Jhaveri was inclined to spirituality since a young age. At the age of four, Jhaveri began contemplating Jain philosophy. The first time he encountered Shrimad Rajchandra was via a photograph, when a copy of The Shrimad Rajchandra Vachanamrit merely fell into his view. After this event, Jhaveri took a deep 72 hour mediation. In this state, Jhaveri recounted experiencing jāti smaraṇa gnān (जाति स्मरण ज्ञान), or "the knowledge of past lives".

By 1978, an audience formed a satsang involving Jhaveri. In a short amount of time, his audience gave Jhaveri the Guru title; but he denied it, claiming inexperience. At first, Jhaveri was unsure about taking on a devotional life. Until, visiting his aunt in jaipur, where he recited the Namokar Mantra. This experience aided his final decision for his spiritual advancement. In 1983, Jhaveri left for Hampi despite his parents disagreement. During his stay in Hampi, Jhaveri was nominated to be the successor of Mataji Dhandeviji. Jhaveri sought his parents approval, which they agreed in the condition that he would go into studies. Following his parents approval, Jhaveri began studying religious texts, practicing Yoga, and learning Indian classical music. During 1985-1990, Jhaveri observed silence for up to 12 hours per day and traveled extensively. During this period, his audience grew to nearly five-hundred individuals.

In 1988, Jhaveri continued to his studies and completed a B. A. from Osmania University, Hyderabad. Later in 1991, he finished his M.A. in Philosophy via The University of Mumbai. Jhaveri desired to further his studies with an aim of obtaining a PhD, as he refused giving public discourses without being thoroughly educated. He began his PhD in 1998 from The University of Mumbai. His doctoral studies focused on Atmasiddhi, a spiritual work composed by Shrimad Rajchandra. On December 2nd, 2001 Jhaveri was awarded his PhD, continuing to give his first formal discourse in Rajkot on 13 April 2001.

Jhaveri does not consider himself a monk, but follows closely to their monastic vows and adheres to a similar level of discipline. Currently, he resides with his followers at the ashram in Dharampur and with his family when visiting Mumbai.

== Shrimad Rajchandra Mission ==
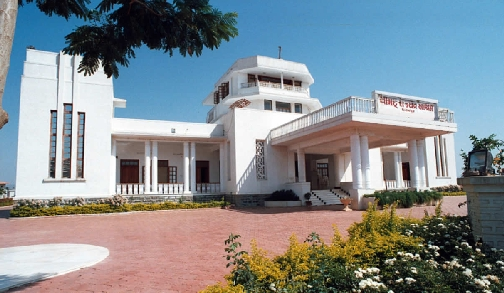
Ashram building at Dharampur

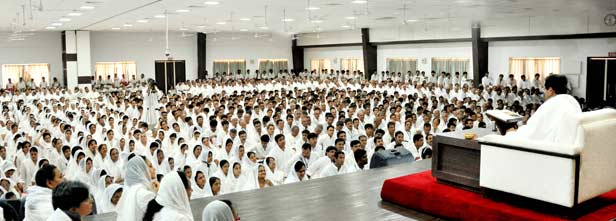
Rakeshbhai delivering discourse in Dharampur

Jhaveri established Shrimad Rajchandra Adhyatmik Satsang Sadhana Kendra in 1994 to organise his followers which was later succeeded by the Shrimad Rajchandra Mission Dharampur. On 13 May 1999, the construction of an ashram spread across 223 acres (90 ha) at Dharampur was started and was opened in April 2001. The ashram is located on the hillock of Mohangadh which was an estate of the last ruler of the erstwhile Dharampur State. In 2002, he started initiating followers, Atmarpits, who give up worldly possessions and commit to celibacy. He gives the series of discourses to his followers at the ashram throughout the year. He gives discourses in Mumbai once a month on Shrimad Rajchandra Vachanamrut, a compilation of Shrimad Rajchandra's letters, personal diaries and transcriptions of his spiritual discourses. He also prescribes an annual scriptural study schedule to his followers.

He established Shrimad Rajchandra Love and Care (SRLC); a non-governmental organisation that provides medical, educational and humanitarian services; in 2003. The NGO received a special consultative status with the United Nations Economic and Social Council in 2020 due to its projects that work towards the UN Sustainable Development Goals.

In November 2016, the Mission produced a play, Yugpurush: Mahatma na Mahatma depicting spiritual relationship between Shrimad Rajchandra and Mahatma Gandhi. The Mission opened a science college in Dharampur, Shrimad Rajchandra Vidyapeeth, the same month. In November 2017, the 34-feet tall statue of Shrimad Rajchandra was unveiled at the ashram. By January 2025, the Mission has 206 Satsang Centres, 96 Youth Centres and 252 Children Centres worldwide. In 2019, the Mission and the Sangeet Natak Akademi co-produced a play Bharat Bhagya Vidhata focused on how Mahatma Gandhi cultivated the values of truth and non-violence. The Mission gifted statue of Mahatma Gandhi to the city of Manchester to serve as a "symbol of love and compassion" following the 2017 Manchester Arena bombing. It was unveiled in November 2019. On April 25, 2021, Shrimad Rajchandra Hospital established a 150-bed COVID Care Centre in Dharampur during COVID-19 pandemic in India.

== Influence ==
Bauer notes that "[in] recent years there has been a convergence of the Kanji Swami Panth and the Shrimad Rajcandra movement, part of trend toward a more eucumenical and less sectarian Jainism among educated, mobile Jains living overseas." Kanji Panth is a school of Jainism, nominally belonging to the Śvetāmbara but inspired by the Digambara scholar Kundakunda (8th c. CE) and Shrimad Rajchandra (1867-1901), though "lacking a place in any Digambara ascetic lineage descending from Kundakunda."

In a 2023 Tablet (magazine) article about Jainism in America, scholar Steven Vose says "his teachings focus on practical, self-help ideas such as using meditation to reduce stress and applying Jain principles in daily life...are popular among educated Jains and those living abroad, but more traditional Jains feel that this approach weakens or softens strict Jain teachings.

== Recognition ==
In August 2023, the Claremont School of Theology conferred him with Honorary Doctor of Divinity (DD) for his significant contributions to the realm of spirituality and selfless service.

== Bibliography ==
- 2011 – A Life Worth Living - Inspiring seekers to lead a Meaningful life , 187 pp. ISBN 978-93-84405-47-2
- 2011 – Embark on the Inner Journey: Transformation through introspection , 217 pp. ISBN 978-93-84405-22-9
- 2012 – The Path Enlightened - Discovering the essence of religion, 179 pp. ISBN 978-93-84405-32-8
- 2012 – Seek Thy Eternal Self, 179 pp. ISBN 978-93-84405-19-9
- 2013 – Bliss Within - Shattering the illusion of false happiness, to attain true joy , 210 pp. ISBN 978-93-84405-48-9
- 2013 – Time to Awaken - "Guidance for bringing an end to transmigration and accelerating the journey to liberation, 219 pp. ISBN 978-93-84405-60-1
- 2014 – Shrimad Rajchandra - Saga of Spirituality, 275 pp. ISBN 978-81-929141-1-4
- 2015 – A Divine Union, 162 pp. ISBN 978-93-84405-65-6
- 2016 – Sadguru Insights: 50 Enlightening Lessons from the Master, 208 pp. ISBN 978-93-84405-67-0
- 2016 – Sadguru Communion, 117 pp. ISBN 978-93-84405-73-1
- 2016 – Sadguru Nuggets, 135 pp. ISBN 978-93-84405-68-7
- 2016 – Sadguru Alerts - 50 Insightful Questions from the Master, 64 pp. ISBN 978-93-84405-74-8
- 2019 – Sadguru Capsules - Weekly Profound Contemplations from the Master, 119 pp. ISBN 978-93-84405-77-9
- 2021 - Atmasiddhi Shastra: Six Spiritual Truths of the Soul (Concise & Complete Commentary), 568 pp. ISBN 978-93-54894-03-9

== Sources ==
- Bauer, Jerome (2004). "Kanji Swami (1890-1980)". In Jestice, Phyllis G. (ed.). Holy People of the World: A Cross-Cultural Encyclopedia. Vol. 1. ABC-CLIO. p. 464. ISBN 9781576073551.
- Salter, Emma (2002). Raj Bhakta Marg: the path of devotion to Srimad Rajcandra. A Jain community in the twenty first century (Doctoral thesis). University of Wales. pp. 98–108, 247, 251 – via University of Huddersfield Repository.
- Shaw, Richard. "Kanji swami Panth". University of Cumbria. Division of Religion and philosophy.
