= Bhuleshwar =

- Neighbourhood
- Location in Mumbai, India
- Coordinates: 18.95°N 72.83°E
- Country: India
- State: Maharashtra
- District: Mumbai City
- City: Mumbai

Government
  - Type: Municipal Corporation
  - Body: Brihanmumbai Municipal Corporation (MCGM)

Languages
  - Official: Marathi
- Time zone: UTC+5:30 (IST)
- PIN: 400002
- Area code: 022
- Vehicle registration: MH 01
- Civic agency: BMC

Bhuleshwar (Old spelling Bholeśvar) is a neighbourhood in Mumbai. It is situated in South Mumbai and to the north of the Fort area. It is known for being home to over 100 temples including Mumba Devi Temple of Mumbai, the patron goddess of the city of Mumbai and Swaminarayan Mandir. The area is also known for the Bhuleshwar Market for fruit and vegetable and is surrounded a number of old markets, like the Crawford Market for fruits and vegetables, Mangaldas Market for silk and cloth, Zaveri Bazaar, the famous jewellery and diamond market and Chor Bazaar, a noted market for antiques and furniture.

Its near by areas are Kalbadevi, Girgaon, Princess Street

The guide and historical study book, Alice in Bhuleshwar about the locality was published in 2009.

== See also ==
- Shri Swaminarayan Mandir, Mumbai
