= Zaveri Bazaar =

Jewelry market in Mumbai, India

Coordinates: 18.951808°N 72.830697°E

Zaveri Bazaar is a jewellery market and a major hub for B2B and B2C jewellery industry in Mumbai, India. Located at Bhuleshwar in South Mumbai, just north of Crawford Market, Zaveri Bazaar is a muddle of narrow lanes, dotted with hundreds of jewellery shops that sell gems and jewels, notably Tribhovandas Bhimji Zaveri (TBZ), Dwarkadas Chandumal, Dhirajlal Bhimji Zaveri & UTZ. 65% of all gold trading and dealing in India is estimated to originate from the market.

== Occupancy ==
The market houses the headquarters of many jewellery institutions of India including Jagawat Sons (of Mankhush Jagawat) and Tribhovandas Bhimji Zaveri, one of the biggest jewellery retailers of India, established in 1864. A variety of gems and precious stones are available in the market as well as ornaments of traditional Indian designs to modern designs made of every possible gem and precious metal. Zaveri Bazaar is regarded as being secured because it has CCTVs installed in order to avoid almost any crime, private protection involved for every shop, the industry is under 24 hours vigilance because it does a huge trade in diamond and also other metal jewellery. Zaveri Bazaar is also famous for photo frames, clips, tea-sets, dinnerware, toys and other luxury lifestyle articles crafted out of expensive metals. Zaveri Bazaar gets the maximum credit of jewellery and gems export from the country.

== Incidents ==
It has been the target of three attacks in Mumbai since 1993. It was one of the 12 areas bombed during the 1993 Bombay bombings, followed by the 25 August 2003 Mumbai bombings and the more recent 13 July 2011 Mumbai bombings.

== See also ==
- Bazaar
- Market (place)
- Retail
- Souq
- Zaveri
