= Manoj Shah =

Indian theatre director

- Born: Manoj Sakarchand Shah; 5 February 1955 (age 71); Mumbai, Maharashtra, India
- Occupations: theatre director, actor and producer
- Organization: Ideas Unlimited
- Notable work: Master Phoolmani (1999); Mareez (2004); Apurva Avsar (2007); Jal Jal Mare Patang (2009); Hu Chandrakant Bakshi (2013); Karl Marx in Kalbadevi (2013); Mohan No Masalo (2015); Dr. Anandibai Joshi: Like, Comment, Share (2017)

Manoj Sakarchand Shah (born 5 February 1955) is an Indian theatre director, actor and producer known for his works in the Gujarati theatre. He has directed over 90 plays, such as one-man plays and biographical plays, in different genres. He is known primarily for his quirky biographical plays which include: Hu Chandrakant Bakshi based on the writer of the same name, Mohan No Masalo based on Mahatma Gandhi, Apurva Avsar based on Jain mystic Shrimad Rajchandra, Mareez based on poet Mareez, Jal Jal Mare Patang based on writer-philosopher Manilal Dwivedi, Karl Marx in Kalbadevi based on German philosopher Karl Marx, and Dr. Anandibai Joshi: Like, Comment, Share based on Anandi Gopal Joshi, India's first female doctor. He produces plays under his theatre company Ideas Unlimited.

His play Mohan No Masalo was included in the Limca Book of Records for its performances in three languages (English, Hindi and Gujarati) in a single day. His biographical drama Mareez has been playing at Prithvi Theatre since 2004.

== Biography ==
Manoj Sakarchand Shah was born on 5 February 1955 in Mumbai, India. He studied until the ninth grade at various schools in Mumbai and Ahmedabad. He began his career as a dance teacher and then as an actor. He decided to become a theatre director when he watched a play directed by Mahendra Joshi. He was inspired by the works of other theatre directors including Badal Sircar, Utpal Dutt and Vijaya Mehta. He debuted as a theatre director with his play Master Phoolmani in 1999.

== Works ==
Shah has directed and produced over 90 plays. He produces them under his production company Ideas Unlimited.

His style has been considered innovative, and his subjects contributed to bringing a cultural renaissance in Gujarati theatre. His plays dwell on literary and spiritual themes, often featuring solo actors. His protagonists tend to be either people with quirky characters or heroes in unusual circumstances. For example, in one of his plays, Karl Marx in Kalbadevi (2012), he imagines a visit by Karl Marx to Kalbadevi, a chaotic locality in Mumbai. His one man plays have the actor soliloquising before the audience. Stagecraft is at a minimum, with the key technique one that consists of an actor interpreting his character role. His texts in this genre, theatre critic Vikram Phukan writes, are notable for their clarity.

His first play was Master Phoolmani, which was adapted from Satish Alekar's Begum Barve (1979). Scripted by Chandrakant Shah, it was first staged in 1999 at Horniman Circle Gardens, Mumbai, during the Prithvi Theatre Festival. The play is a tribute to the extinct Gujarati theatre form known as 'Bhangwadi', (Note: The term 'Bhagwadi' was derived from the Bhangwadi neighborhood in Mumbai which was a centre of theatre activities in the early 1870s. Male actors impersonated females then because acting was a social taboo and females could not participate in the theatre. The actors had to speak dialogues loudly so the whole audience could hear it. Music, dance and singing was an integral part of theatre then.) which was popular for its musical folk performance style. The play revolves around Manilal, who refers to himself by his stage name Phoolmani. Manilal is a 'Bhangwadi' performer who loses his bearings as the tradition fades into obscurity. But he is jolted back to reality by his despotic employer, Vallabhbhai Bhatia, for whom he sells incense and flowers. Master Phoolmani deftly knits together worlds that unfold against backdrops painted by the artist Bhupen Khakhar. Master Phoolmani also integrates some elements from the life of Jaishankar Bhojak, a 20th-century Gujarati theatre actor known for impersonating female characters. Master Phoolmani was Shah's longest running production until 2015.

In 2003, he produced Gujarat Ni Asmita, a musical drama which features 45 actors. It traces the journey of Gujarati poetry from the medieval era to the present. In 2004, his biographical play Mareez was produced. The play has been performed more than 200 times since 2012 and has played at the Prithvi Theatre since 2004. Based on the life and works of the mid-twentieth century Gujarati poet Mareez, Vinit Shukla adapted it from Mareez's biography Mareez: Astitva Ane Vyaktitva written by Raeesh Maniar. Mareez's representation has been influenced by Vincent van Gogh's autobiographical work Dear Theo and Charles Bukowski's biopic Barfly.

Apurva Avsar (2007), written by Raju Dave and Shah, is a biographical play about Shrimad Rajchandra, known as a spiritual guide of Mahatma Gandhi. It focuses on Rajchandra's life from his childhood in a small remote village in Gujarat to his eventual renunciation of all worldly pleasures. Siddh Hem (2008) is based on Hemachandra, the Indian Jain scholar. Dharmendra Gohil played the lead character.

In 2009, he directed the biographical play Jal Jal Mare Patang based on the life of the 19th-century Gujarati philosopher and writer Manilal Dwivedi. Mummy Tu Aavi Kevi (2010) is a children's play written by Dhiruben Patel. He directed Apoorav Khela (2012), a biographical play on 17th century Jain monk Anandghan.

Mahatma Gandhi is the subject of Mohan No Masalo, a monodrama. It starred Pratik Gandhi as Mohandas Gandhi. The play recounts the early days of Mohandas Gandhi in India and South Africa before he came to be known as Mahatma. The play portrays Gandhi as a layman with extraordinary means to achieve his ends. It was staged in three languages: Gujarati (Mohan No Masalo), Hindi (Mohan Ka Masala) and English (Mohan's Masala). It premiered on 22 March 2015 at the National Centre for the Performing Arts (NCPA). Atul Dodiya created the play's set and backdrop, which featured images of a young Gandhi in black and white. The Gujarati script was written by Satya Mehta, the Hindi by Mihir Bhuta and Arpit Jain, and the English by Ishan Doshi. It recounts Gandhi's childhood and shows how it shaped his future. It was included in the Limca Book of Records for "Performance of One Play in Multiple Languages in One Day".

In 2013, he produced another biographical drama, Hu Chandrakant Bakshi. Written by Shishir Ramavat, the play focuses on Gujarati writer Chandrakant Bakshi (1932–2006). In this production, Pratik Gandhi played the lead character. The play, along with Mohan No Masalo, helped to solidify Gandhi's reputation as an actor. That year he directed Karl Marx in Kalbadevi. The play puts German philosopher Karl Marx in a hypothetical situation, asking what would happen if he arrived in Kalbadevi, a happening locality in Mumbai, in the present-day. In the production, Satchit Puranik played Marx.

Popcorn with Parsai (2014) is a biographical solo-act based on Hindi writer Harishankar Parsai. Co-written by Shah and Nilay Upadhyay, it premiered at NCPA on 6 December 2014.

Dr. Anandibai Joshi: Like, Comment, Share, a solo performance, premiered in 2017 at NCPA, is a biographical play which features a woman playing the lead for the first time in Shah's one-man plays. Written by Geeta Manek, the play is based on the life of Anandibai Joshi, India's first female doctor. Manasi Prabhakar Joshi played Anandibai Joshi's role. It asks and answers several questions regarding women's freedom. It was later staged in Hindi and Marathi, and became part of Theatre Olympics.

== Plays ==
List of plays directed by Shah:

S.N.	Play	Year	Writer	Notes
1	Master Phoolmani	1999	Chandrakant Shah	Adapted from Satish Alekar's Begum Barve
2	Akho Akha Bolo	2000	Kanti Patel	Biographical play about medieval Gujarati poet Akho
3	Savita	2000	Bhupen Khakhar	Monologue
4	System	2000	Uttam Gada	Monologue
5	Maganlal No Gundar	2000	Bhupen Khakhar	
6	Foreign Soap	2000	Bhupen Khakhar	
7	Briel	2000	C. C. Mehta	Monologue
8	Medea	2000	C. C. Mehta	Monologue
9	Mukund Rai	2000	Raju Dave	Adaptation of Ramnarayan V. Pathak's eponymous short story
10	Jakshni	2000	Raju Dave	Adaptation of Ramnarayan V. Pathak's eponymous short story
11	Idli Orchid Ne Hu	2001	Vitthal Kamat	
12	Parpota Na Desh Ma	2001	Raju Dave, Ankit Trivedi	Dramatisation of Panna Naik's poem
13	Varta Kaho Ne – Thigadu	2001	Bharat Naik	Adaptation of Suresh Joshi's eponymous short story
14	Parshchad Bhumika	2001	Phanishwar Nath 'Renu'	Dramatised reading for National Book Trust
15	Trasyo Sangam	2001	Raju Dave	Monologue based on Harkisan Mehta's eponymous novel
16	Jagga Dakku	2001	Raju Dave	Monologue based on Harkisan Mehta's eponymous novel
17	Bhedbharam	2001	Shishir Ramawat	Monologue based on Harkisan Mehta's eponymous novel
18	Sansari Sadhu	2002	Shrikant Gautam	Monologue based on Harkisan Mehta's eponymous novel
19	Jad Chetan	2002	Shishir Ramawat	Monologue based on Harkisan Mehta's eponymous novel
20	Orange Juice	2002	Uttam Gada	Hindi language play
21	Mano Mel Te Maitri	2002	Raju Dave	Adaptation of Aleksei Arbuzov's play
22	Giras Ma Ek Dungri	2002	Meria Shresh Mitsakaben	
23	Raman Bhaman	2003	Ashwini Bhatt	
24	Gujarat Ni Asmita	2003	Narsinh Mehta, Meera, Akho, Premanand Bhatt, Dayaram, Dalpatram, Alexander Kinloch Forbes, Narmad, Jhaverchand Meghani, Jivram Joshi	
25	Te He Na Devaso	2003	Raju Dave	Adaptation of the story by Harivallabh Bhayani
26	Swajan Utsav	2003	Dhiruben Patel, Natwar Gandhi, Mahesh Dave, Pravin Joshi, Nalini Mandgaonkar, Mukul Choksi, Raeesh Maniar, Udayan Thakker, Mukesh Joshi, Ankit Trivedi, Hiten Anandpara, and Suresh Dalal	Dramatised presentation of poems
27	Agantuk	2003	Vipul Bhargav	Adaptated from Dhiruben Patel's eponymous story
28	Vanechand No Varghodo	2003	Prakash Kapadia	Based on Shahabuddin Rathod's work
29	Monji Ruder	2003	Vinit Shukla	Based on Swami Anand's work
30	Runanubandh	2003	Raju Dave	Based on a short story by Pravinsinh Chavda
31	Tribute To Bhupen Khakhar	2004	Bhupen Khakhar	
32	Mareez	2004	Vinit Shukla	Based on the life and work of mid-twentieth century Gujarati poet Mareez
33	Kshemraj Ne Sadhvi	2004	Govardhanram Tripathi	
34	Chalte Chalte	2004	Chandrakant Shah	
35	Guajarat No Nath	2004	Suren Thaker 'Mehul'	Based on K. M. Munshi's eponymous novel
36	Meera	2004	Mihir Bhuta	Based on Ramesh Parekh's poetry
37	Blue Jeans	2004		A dramatised poem by Chandrakant Shah
38	Bharelo Agani	2004	Manoj Shah	Based on R. V. Desai's eponymous novel
39	Mestro Masters Swami	2005	Multiple writers	
40	Boom Rang	2005	Raju Dave	Based on a story by Nilesh Rana
41	Nami Gaya Te Gami Gaya	2005	Pankaj Trivedi	
42	Gamta No Kariea Gulal	2005	Dinkar Joshi, Raju Dave, Satya Mehta	Based on works by Ramanbhai Neelkanth, Govardhanram Tripathi, Ranjitram Mehta, Jhaverchand Meghani, Narmad, Umashankar Joshi, Harivallabh Bhayani,
43	Janoi Vadh Ghha	2005	Raju Dave, Satya Mehta	Based on Ramesh Parekh's poetry
44	Varsad Bhinjve	2006	Raju Dave, Satya Mehta, Ankit Trivedi	Based on Ramesh Parekh's poetry
45	Lata Shu Bole	2006	Gulabdas Broker	Dramatised reading of Gulabdas Broker's eponymous short story
46	Rajputani	2006	Prakash Kapadia	Based on Dhumketu's eponymous short story
47	Jher to Pidha Jaani Jaani	2006	Upendra Trivedi	Based on Manubhai Pancholi's novel
48	Socrates	2006	Kanti Patel	Based on Manubhai Pancholi's novel
49	Ame Baraf Na Pankhi	2006	Kanti Madia	Based on a work by Marathi writer Vasant Kanetkar
50	Lajo	2007	Paresh Vyas	Based on work by Ismat Chughtai
51	Apurva Avsar	2007	Raju Dave, Manoj Shah	Biographical play about late 19th-century Jain mystic and philosopher Shrimad Rajchandra
52	Little Bit Gamvanu	2007	Chandrakant Shah	
53	Jite Hain Shaan Se	2008	Shishir Ramawat	
54	Achlayatan	2008	J. B. Kripalani, Mahadev Desai, Swami Anand	Adapted from a work by Rabindranath Tagore
55	Atma Gynani	2008	Raju Dave	Biographical play about Dada Bhagwan
56	Siddha Hem	2008	Jonhy Shah	
57	Jal Jal Mare Patang	2009	Mihir Bhuta	Biographical play about 19th-century Gujarati writer Manilal Dwivedi
58	Amarfal	2010	Bharat Naik	Based on the legend of king Bharthari
59	Hello Gujarati	2010	Raju Dave, Satya Mehta	
60	Mahajan Darshan	2010	Raghuveer Chaudhari, Jayesh Mehta	
61	Firewall	2010	Uttam Gada	
62	Red Sea	2010	Uttam Gada	
63	Mummy Tu Aavi Kevi	2010	Dhiruben Patel	
64	Kasper	2011	Chandrakant Shah	Monologue
65	New York New York	2011	Chandrakant Shah	Monologue
66	Apoorav Khela	2012	Dhanvant Shah	Biographical play about Anandghan
67	Karl Marx in Kalbadevi	2013	Uttam Gada	
68	Hu Chandrakant Bakshi	2013	Shishir Ramavat	Monologue; Biographical play about Gujarati writer Chandrakant Bakshi
69	Bhamashah	2013	Bipin Doshi, Mihir Bhuta	Hindi language play about Bhamashah and Maharana Pratap
70	Master Madam	2013	Will Johnson, Vijay Pandya, Abhishek Khelkar, Satya Mehta	Based on the work by Bodhayana
71	Lakshmi Poojan	2013	Uttam Gada	
72	Pappa, No Problem	2014	Hemant Kariya	
73	Bhavprapanch	2014	Sidharshi Gani	
74	Popcorn with Parsai	2014	Nilay Upadhyay	Based on the work by Harishankar Parsai
75	BKP Ni Duniya Rang Rangili & Mahajan	2014	Prayag Dave, Raju Dave	
76	Mohan No Masalo	2015	Ishan Doshi, Satya Mehta	Biographical play about early life of Mahatma Gandhi
77	Pai Pai	2015	Dhiruben Patel	
78	Karl Marx in Kalbadevi	2015	Uttam Gada	in Hinglish
79	Whats Up?	2015	Uttam Gada	Monologue; Social Comedy
80	Mohan's Masala	2016	Ishan Doshi, Satya Mehta	Monologue English version of Mohan No Masalo
81	Gathariya	2016	Satya Mehta	Story of Chandravadan Mehta(Chan Chi Mehta) Based on a work by Kanti Patel
82	Mohan Ka Masala	2016	Ishan Doshi, Satya Mehta	Monologue Hindi version of Mohan No Masalo
83	Kamra Bhabhi No Baraapo	2016	Adhir Amdavadi	
84	Margdarshan	2016	Sitanshu Yashaschandra	
85	Vrudhshatak	2016	Kamal Vora	Dramatised reading of Kamal Vora's poetry
86	Khichadi	2016	Labhshankar Thakar	Tribute to Labhshankar Thakar.
87	Sikkani Triji Baju	2016	Naushil Mehta	Comic Thriller
88	Dr. Anandibai Joshi: Like, Comment, Share	2017	Geeta Manek	Biographical play about Anandibai Joshi
89	Kaagdo	2019	Geeta Manek	
90	Mitha No Satyagrah	2019	Naushil Mehta	
91	Adbhut	2021	Satchit Puranik	
92	Mr. Apple	2022	Shishir Ramavat	On the relationship of Steve Jobs and his daughter
93	Bombay Flower	2023	Gita Manek	Biographical play about Ratanbai ‘Ruttie’ Petit who had married Muhammad Ali Jinnah
94	Third Bell	2024	Ishan Doshi	Third Bell captures the funny, relatable, and heartfelt moments among audience members waiting in a theatre just before the play begins]
95	Tabiyat	2025	Satchit Puranik	Tabiyat is an investigative musical that explores the search for balance between body, mind, and soul through symbolic characters representing human organs in a mysterious health crisis.]
96	Socrates	2026	Dipak Soliya	Socrates explores the life, philosophy, and mysterious death of the legendary Greek thinker, highlighting his fearless pursuit of truth, morality, and freedom of thought even in the face of punishment.]
