= Mareez (play) =

2004 Gujarati play

- Written by: Vinit Shukla
- Original language: Gujarati
- Subject: Mareez
- Genre: Biographical play

Premiere
- Date premiered: 16 November 2004
- Place premiered: Prithvi Theatre, Mumbai
- Official website

Mareez is a 2004 biographical play about mid-twentieth century Gujarati poet Mareez, written by Vinit Shukla and directed by Manoj Shah. One of Shah's long-running productions, it premiered on 16 November 2004 at Prithvi Theatre, Mumbai.

== Background ==
Directed by Manoj Shah and written by Vinit Shukla, the play narrates the life of Mareez. The play has been adapted by the author from Mareez's biography Mareez: Astitva Ane Vyaktitva (2001) written by Raeesh Maniar. The representation of Mareez has been influenced by Vincent van Gogh's autobiographical work Dear Theo and Charles Bukowski's biopic Barfly. The set features six paintings painted by Gulam Mohammed Sheikh.

The play premiered on 16 November 2004 at Prithvi Theatre, Mumbai.

== Cast and characters ==
The original cast included:

- Dharmendra Gohil as Mareez
- Nayan Shukla as Mohsin, Mareez's son
- Ishan Doshi as young Mohsin
- Kumkum Das as Sona, Mareez's wife
- Jay Upadhaya as Thakur
- Aishwarya Mehta as Rabab, Mareez's girlfriend
- Dayashamkar Pandey as Saadat Hasan Manto
- Darshan Pandya as Indra
- Pulkit Solanki
- Pratik Gandhi
- Rajive Bhatt
- Shamath Mazumdar
- Akash Desai
- Hussaini Davawala
- Pradeep Vegurlekar
- Ashok Parmar
- Dhruv Dave

== Reception ==
Mareez is one of Shah's long-running productions.

Utpal Bhayani was impressed by Dharmendra Gohil's acting and called "Mareez was in his veins". He also praised director and writer for connecting Mareez with Manto and Ghalib. He also praised performances of Dayashankar Pande, Nayan Shukla and Kumkum Das. He also praised costumes, production, music, audios, backdrops and lighting. He found Mareez's Mushairas with other poets from which he became well known, missing from the play.

Deepa Punjani of Mumbai Theatre Guide praised the performances, direction, writing and production. She found the presentation of various phases of Mareez's life interesting and engaging. She found the "drama of Mareez's life indulgent" but found the play "fresh" and important for literature and performance.

Journalist Ashish Vashi praised Dharmendra Gohil's performance and called it "most remarkable and mesmerizing aspect of the play".

In May 2023, Mohsin and Lalua, sons of Mareez, issued public notice regarding the lack of consent from them for the play. They sought compensation as the owners of intellectual property rights of Mareez. They had objected to the fictional events as well as private events from their father's life portrayed in the play.
