= Mohan No Masalo =

2015 Gujarati play

- Official poster
- Written by: Ishan Doshi (English); Satya Mehta (Gujarati translation); Arpit Jain (Hindi translation)
- Characters: Mohandas Gandhi
- Original language: Gujarati
- Subject: Mohandas Gandhi
- Genre: Biographical one-man play
- Setting: 19th century

Premiere
- Date premiered: 22 March 2015
- Place premiered: National Centre for the Performing Arts
- Official website

Mohan No Masalo (English: Mohan's Recipe) is a 2015 biographical one-man play about Mahatma Gandhi, starring Pratik Gandhi. Written by Ishan Doshi and directed by Manoj Shah, it depicts the early life of Mohandas Gandhi. First performed in Gujarati, the play later staged in English and Hindi. It was included in the Limca Book of Records for its performances in three languages (English, Hindi and Gujarati) in a single day.

== Background ==
Mohan No Masalo was originally written in English by Ishan Doshi, and later translated into Gujarati by Satya Mehta, and into Hindi by Arpit Jain. It was premiered on 22 March 2015 at National Centre for the Performing Arts (NCPA).

== Plot synopsis ==
The play opens with Mohan searching for his missing diary. He meet people on a local train in Mumbai, then Mr. Somaiya who is known for his Gandhi collection, and John Briley who was a screenwriter of film Gandhi but no one had his diary. The diary contains the recollections from Gandhi's youth. He cries that everyone knows Mahatma (his later career) but no one knows Mohan (his early life).

Then Mohan narrates his life as a person who have come from Kathiawad. He talks about his parents, ancestors and associates as well as his life at Rajkot, Mumbai, London and Durban in South Africa at last. He describes his travel on the steamship. He wears western clothes during his barrister studies in London. He talks about well known events from his birth, childhood, teenage and youth; each connecting to one of the concepts of Gandhian philosophy.

== Reception ==
Mohan No Masalo was included in the Limca Book of Records for "performance of one play in multiple languages in one day" in 2016.

Utpal Bhayani praised the concept of "recipe to Mahatma" introducing early life of Gandhi to the audience as well as solo performance of Pratik Gandhi. He found the settings, costumes and properties appropriate to the time. Keyur Seta of the Mumbai Theatre Guide calls the play "nothing new" but "entertaining". He praised writing, direction and the performance while criticising the lighting. Deepa Gahlot writing for Mid-day praised the direction, writing and the performance. She particularly find it "entertaining" because it is "peppered with humour and delivered with verve".

== See also ==
- List of artistic depictions of Mahatma Gandhi
