= Dr. Anandibai Joshi: Like, Comment, Share =

2017 Gujarati-language play

Dr. Anandibai Joshi
- Official poster
- Written by: Geeta Manek
- Characters: Anandibai Joshi (played by Mansi Prabhakar Joshi)
- Original language: Gujarati
- Subject: Anandibai Joshi
- Genre: solo performance

Premiere
- Date premiered: 2 December 2017
- Place premiered: National Centre for the Performing Arts, Mumbai

Dr. Anandibai Joshi is a 2017 Gujarati-language one-man play about Anandibai Joshi (1865–1887), first Indian woman physician, written by Gita Manek and directed by Manoj Shah. Mansi Prabhakar Joshi played the role of Anandibai in the production. The play premiered on 2 December 2017 at the National Centre for the Performing Arts, Mumbai for its Center Stage Drama Festival 2017. Unlike Shah's other one-man plays, this play features a woman character for the first time. It was later staged in Hindi and Marathi language.

== Background ==
Geeta Manek drew his original inspiration for her play while researching for her women-centric column Koi Gori Koi Sanwari for a Gujarati newspaper and magazine. The play premiered on 2 December 2017 at the National Centre for the Performing Arts, Mumbai for its Center Stage Drama Festival 2017. The play was later stages in Hindi and Marathi languages. Anandibai's character was enacted by Mansi Prabhakar Joshi. This is Shah's first play in which a woman character appears in a solo performance. The Marathi version of the play was premiered on 4 May 2018 at A. N. Bhalerao Natyagruh Mangalwadi during Damu Kenkre Theatre Festival.

The play is a semi-biographical. While narrating Anandibai's life, the play also depicts the status of women in contemporary Indian society. The play poses several question regarding women's freedom and tries to answer it.

== Reception ==
The play became part of the Theatre Olympics.

Utpal Bhayani praised direction, lighting, costumes, script and production. He found the play inspiring and apt representation of Anandibai's life. He called "Like, Comment, Share" in the title as a "gimmick" as well as found Anandibai's communication with various victims in their afterlife "unnecessary" and "artificial".

Deepa Gahlot cited the play among "10 Most Socially Relevant Theatre Productions" She called the story "powerful" and praised the performance of Joshi.
