= Apurva Avsar =

2007 Gujarati-language play

- Official poster
- Written by: Manoj Shah; Raju Dave
- Original language: Gujarati
- Subject: Shrimad Rajchandra
- Genre: Biographical play

Premiere
- Date premiered: 28 February 2007
- Place premiered: Prithvi Theatre, Mumbai
- Official website

Apurva Avsar is a 2007 biographical play about an Indian Jain philosopher and mystic Shrimad Rajchandra directed by Manoj Shah. The play is co-written by Shah and Raju Dave.

== Background ==
Manoj Shah contributed significantly in the development of Jain performing arts. He directed several plays on Jain personalities including: Apurva Khela based on Anandghan, Veerayan based on Mahavira, Bhavaprapanch based on Siddharishi Gani, Siddhahem based on Hemachandra, Vastupal Tejpal based on two brothers Vastupal and Tejpal, and Jiyo Jee Bhar Ke.

Apurva Avsar is second in these series of plays. The title of play comes from Rajchandra's poem "Apurva Avsar Aevo Kyare Aavshe". The play premiered on 28 February 2007 at Prithvi Theatre, Mumbai. The play narrates Rajchandra's life story from his childhood in a small remote village of Gujarat to his eventual renunciation of all worldly pleasures, and shows how Jainism contributed in the development of the Indian heritage, religion, language, literature, art and philosophy.

== Cast and characters ==
The original cast included:

- Dharmendra Gohil as Shrimad Rajchandra
- Pulkit Solanki
- Pratik Gandhi

== Reception ==
Theatre critic Utpal Bhayani considers the play as a 'noble attempt' as it tries to capture the astonishing and almost magical life of the protagonist who had divine powers of knowing previous births, undertaking several tasks at once and even reading minds. While intriguing by themselves, these scenes seem stretched, especially in the second half, he adds, lack of dramatic dialogues adds to that feeling as well. Bhayani obverses that Manoj Shah, who is also the co writer, is better at directing the play than writing it. Several formal and directorial interventions, especially novel usage of props, voice overs, light design etc. make the stage space interesting and notable. Dharmendra Gohil, in the role of protagonist, takes the cake and shows his range as an actor.

Dhwanil Parekh notes that the static scenes of Apurva Avsar, where dialogues are spoken sitting down or are spoken with one bed at the centre of the stage, leads to minimal usage of stage space. However, extensive usage of red and orange lights, which are usually shades rarely used, convey the sense of tension and intensity nicely. Light design is one of the key positive aspects of the play.

Deepa Punjani of Mumbai Theatre Guide praised the concept and philosophy but was disappointed with the "glorification" of the Gujarati intelligentsia through what was a two and a half hour biographical exposition of the distinguished Jain seer Shrimad Rajchandra. The dramatization is focused singularly on the goodness of this child prodigy who achieved moksa before his premature death, a narrative choice which, in her view, left the audience as passive spectators rather than actively engaged in the dramatic tensions of life. This defect is allayed however by incidents where Rajchandra interacts with people he encountered, such as Mahatma Gandhi, on whom he exercised a notable influence. However the concentration on ideas undermined an otherwise poetic and finely crafted script and story, and Punjani admitted to a sense of disappointment. She nonetheless praised the performances of Gohil, Gandhi and Solanki as well as the music and lighting.

== See also ==
- Yugpurush: Mahatma Na Mahatma– A play on Shrimad Rajchandra
