= Hu Chandrakant Bakshi =

2013 Gujarati-language play

- Official poster
- Written by: Shishir Ramavat
- Characters: Chandrakant Bakshi (played by Pratik Gandhi)
- Original language: Gujarati
- Subject: Chandrakant Bakshi
- Genre: Biographical one-man play

Premiere
- Date premiered: 15 June 2013
- Place premiered: Prithvi Theatre, Mumbai
- Official website

Hu Chandrakant Bakshi (English: I, Chandrakant Bakshi) is a 2013 biographical one-man play about Gujarati writer Chandrakant Bakshi, starring Pratik Gandhi. The play is written by Shishir Ramavat and directed by Manoj Shah. It was premiered on 15 June 2013 at Prithvi Theatre, Mumbai.

== Background ==
Hu Chandrakant Bakshi, written by Shishir Ramavat and directed by Manoj Shah, focus on Bakshi's life and his literary career. It was premiered on 15 June 2013 at Prithvi Theatre, Mumbai. The play was produced under Manoj Shah's theatre company Ideas Unlimited.

The director has used a ladder throughout the play which play an instrumental role in the development of play's theme. The ladder has been used to show Bakshi's obsession to be on the top.

== Reception ==
In Utpal Bhayani's assessment, Hu Chandrakant Bakshi, based on the life of celebrated Gujarati writer, is a play that tries to dramatize Bakshi's life by using books and articles written by Bakshi himself. Manoj Shah's directorial sense is visible in the usage of a ladder on stage that the actor often uses to metaphorically convey Bakshi's higher and inflated sense of self. The Performance of Bakshi, carried out by Pratik Gandhi, shows his ability as an actor which he has proved in earlier plays. Here, he gets more room to play. On the downside, the play is merely a repetition of what Bakshi has already written and doesn't provide any novel perspective but rather remains a one-sided story. It lacks any dramatic element. The details of Kutti, the controversial story that led Bakshi to court, are obviously elaborated upon but some more details about his other works would have provided a more wholesome picture. Repeated mention of the director, Manoj Shah, in the monologue as the figure that Bakshi would have mocked and attacked had he been alive, only acts as a distraction and should have been reduced to a great extent.

Keyur Seta of My Theatre Cafe compared the play with Shah's previous play Karl Marx in Kalbadevi, and called Gandhi's performance a "stellar performance", However, he observed that at some points "the protagonist is seen going too far from the main topic of his narration".
