= Jal Jal Mare Patang =

2009 Gujarati play

- Official poster
- Written by: Mihir Bhuta
- Original language: Gujarati
- Subject: Manilal Dwivedi
- Genre: Biographical play
- Setting: 19th-century Bombay and Gujarat

Premiere
- Date premiered: 28 February 2009
- Place premiered: National Centre for the Performing Arts
- Official website

Jal Jal Mare Patang (pronounced [jəl jəl məre pətəŋ]) is a 2009 Gujarati language biographical play that was written by Mihir Bhuta and directed by Manoj Shah. The play depicts the life of 19th-century Indian writer and philosopher Manilal Dwivedi (1858–1898).

== Background ==
Jal Jal Mare Patang, which was written by Mihir Bhuta and directed by Manoj Shah, is based on Manilal's autobiography Atmavrittanta (1979). It took Shah seven years to complete research for the play. It was first premiered at National Centre for the Performing Arts (NCPA) on 28 February 2009.

The play's songs have been sung by Kaumudi Munshi, Purushottam Upadhyay, Ashit Desai, Uday Mazumdar, Suresh Joshi, Parthiv Gohil, and Karsan Sagathiya. The play featured paintings by Atul Dodiya as a backdrop. The play received A-certificate from the Maharashtra Censor Board of Theatres.

== Summary ==
The play presents aspects of Dwivedi's character as a scholar, writer, and supporter of women's education; and his illness. It focuses on lust, literature and spirituality, which according to Shah were major elements of Dwivedi's life.

== Cast ==
The original cast included:

- Vedish Jhaveri as Manilal Dwivedi
- Shailendra Patel as Manilal's father
- Kalpana Shah as Manilal's mother
- Trupti Thakkar as Manilal's wife Fuli
- Vimal Upadhyay as Balashankar Kantharia
- Bhagvati Saghathia as Balashankar Kantharia's wife
- Ashok Parmar as Manilal's pupil Chhotu
- Vaishakhi Shukla as Chhotu's wife Ram
- Aishwarya Mehta as Diwaliben
- Chetan Dhanani as Kavi Kant
- Janam Shah as Kalapi
- Jay Upadhyay as Manilal's Parsi friend

== Reception ==
Utpal Bhayani praised Bhuta and Shah for Jal Jal Mare Patang's authentic adaptation of Dwivedi's life. He also praised performances, especially that of Vedish Jhaveri, as well the as music, songs, costumes, sets, and lighting but criticised the non-linear structure of the play and called it "confusing". He also praised the creativity in scenes such as Manilal's insistence of eschewing the use of western toilets by his parents, his relationships with his wife, his student's wife, and Manigaurin, as well as his ragging at Elphinstone College while criticising Manilal's meetings with Kalapi and Kant. Deepa Punjani of the Mumbai Theatre Guide compared Jal Jal Mare Patang with Shah's previous biographical plays. She criticised its glorification of Manilal, and the predictability and lack of depth and "layers" in the play. Punjani also called Jhaveri's performance "loud and over the top".

== See also ==
- Uncho Parvat, Undi Khin
