= Bombay Flower =

2023 Gujarati play

- Official poster
- Written by: Geeta Manek
- Characters: Rattanbai Jinnah
- Original language: Gujarati
- Subject: Rattanbai Jinnah
- Genre: Biographical drama
- Setting: Bombay during British India

Premiere
- Date premiered: 26 March 2023
- Place premiered: National Centre for the Performing Arts, Mumbai

Bombay Flower is a 2023 play about Ruttie Petit Jinnah, wife of Muhammad Ali Jinnah, written by Geeta Manek and directed by Manoj Shah.

== Background ==
Bombay Flower was premiered at National Centre for the Performing Arts (NCPA) on 26 March 2023. The stage duration of the play is 120 minutes. The script of the play is based on books Mr. and Mrs. Jinnah: The Marriage that Shook India by Sheela Reddy and Ruttie Jinnah: Ek Alag Drashtikon Rajendra Mohan Bhatnagar.

== Cast ==
The original cast included:

- Bhamini Oza Gandhi as Ruttie Petit Jinnah
- Vishal Shah as Muhammad Ali Jinnah
- Dhruv Dave as Kanji Dwarkadas
- Risabh Kamdar as Dinshaw Maneckji Petit and Muhammad Iqbal
- Purvi Desai as Mrs. Petit and Fatima, sister of Jinnah

== Plot ==
Bombay Flower is dedicated to Parsi theatre, which gave rise to the modern theatre of India and laid the foundation of Gujarati theatre. The play is focused on Ratanbai "Ruttie" Petit-Jinnah, who was referred to as 'The Flower of Bombay' by the high society of Bombay. Ruttie revolts against her family and society. The play tries to dwell deeply into the matter regarding the elements that inspire the educated and capable youth to make such decisions. The political circumstances of that time, a thought regarding the origin of Pakistan, the mentality of poet Iqbal implanted in the mind of Jinnah, etc.; historical matters are woven in the plot of the play.

== Reception ==
Deepa Gahlot writes that the "play portrays Ruttie not as a giddy teen flattered by the attentions of a stylish, sophisticated man and rising political star, but a well-read young woman, who wanted to be a part of the freedom struggle and stand by her husband in his fight for Independence".
