= Dedh Bigha Zameen =

2024 Hindi-language film by Pulkit

- Official release poster
- Directed by: Pulkit
- Written by: Pulkit
- Produced by: Shailesh R Singh; Suunil Jain; Hitesh Thakkar
- Starring: Pratik Gandhi; Khushalii Kumar
- Cinematography: Kumar Saurabh
- Edited by: Zubin Sheikh
- Music by: Arko; Rochak Kohli; Anurag Saikia
- Production company: Karma Media And Entertainment
- Distributed by: JioCinema
- Release date: 31 May 2024
- Running time: 106 minutes
- Country: India
- Language: Hindi

Dedh Bigha Zameen (transl. One and a half bighas of land) is a 2024 Indian Hindi-language drama film written and directed by Pulkit and produced by Karma Media And Entertainment. The film features Pratik Gandhi and Khushali Kumar in the lead roles. The film premiered on JioCinema on 31 May 2024.

== Plot ==
Anil, a 28-year-old wheat seller, lives with his wife, mother, and sister. Excited for his sister Neha's marriage to Ajay, a soon-to-be govt servant, Anil agrees to a dowry. To fund it, he plans to sell his late father's land, only to find it's under litigation by MLA Amar Singh. He meets MLA with request to regain possession of his land for which MLA agrees. Later when he returns, the police arrest him for nothing. He realises that the broker has manipulated in favor of MLA. Sister's marriage is cancelled as she is missing or has been kidnapped. Broker confesses after being beaten. An MLAs goon shoots Anil. He dies is the climax.

== Cast ==
- Pratik Gandhi as Anil Singh
- Daya Shankar Pandey as Dharam Singh, Anil's uncle
- Khushalii Kumar as Pooja Singh, Anil's wife
- Vinod Nahardih as Krishna Singh, Anil's father
- Prasanna Bisht as Neha Singh, Anil's younger sister
- Neeraj Sood as MLA Amar Singh
- Durgesh Kumar as Avdesh Gupta, Amar Singh's party worker
- Faisal Malik as Inspector Sunil Yadav

== Production ==
The principal photography of the film began on 15 August 2021 in Jhansi and wrapped September 2021.

== Soundtrack ==
The music for the film is composed by Arko Pravo Mukherjee, Rochak Kohli, Anurag Saikia. Lyrics are written by Arko Pravo Mukherjee, Manoj Muntashir, Rashmi Virag.

The song "Zidd Na Karo" is a remake of some part the song Say Aaj Jane Ki Zid Na Karo', and sung by Farida Khanum.

Track listing
| No. | Title | Lyrics | Music | Singer(s) | Length |
|---|---|---|---|---|---|
| 1. | "Zidd Na Karo" | Manoj Muntashir | Rochak Kohli | Stebin Ben | 4:32 |
| 2. | "Musafir" | Arko | Arko | Jubin Nautiyal | 3:27 |
| 3. | "Chota Sa Mann" | Rashmi Virag | Anurag Saikia | Anurag Saikia, Raghav Chaitanya, Ritrisha Sarmah | 4:10 |
| 4. | "Musafir" (Film Version) | Arko | Arko | Arko | 3:17 |
| Total length: | | | | | 15:16 |

== Reception ==
Deepa Gahlot of Rediff.com rated 3/5 stars and observes "Pratik Gandhi once again proves that he is an actor who can bring any character to life with his dedication to his craft and instinctive understanding of what the role requires." Saibal Chatterjee of NDTV gave 2 stars out of 5 and said in his review that "Pratik Gandhi is in nearly every frame of the film - that isn't a bad thing at all - but the maker of the film would have done well to give the supporting actors more to do." Dhaval Roy of The Times of India rated 3/5 stars and stated that "The movie is worth watching for Pratik Gandhi's performance and the gritty portrayal of a common man's struggle against corruption and injustice." Sonal Pandya of Times Now gave 2.5 stars out of 5 and said "While the milieu and narrative in Dedh Bigha Zameen is strong, its execution is wobbly, especially in the acting department. Gandhi carries the film, but it often veers into melodramatic territory." Rahul Desai of Film Companion said in his review that "This film is a modern ode to Bimal Roy’s brand of neo-realism. But Dedh Bigha Zameen is more than half an acre short of its target. It’s so ‘real’ that it’s nearly boring. In fact, its decision to be boring is supposed to be brave.
