= Karl Marx in Kalbadevi =

2013 Gujarati play

- Official poster
- Written by: Uttam Gada
- Characters: Karl Marx (played by Satchit Puranik)
- Original language: Gujarati
- Subject: Karl Marx
- Genre: One-man play
- Setting: Present time Kalbadevi, Mumbai

Premiere
- Date premiered: 22 March 2013
- Place premiered: National Centre for the Performing Arts, Mumbai
- Official website

Karl Marx in Kalbadevi is a 2013 one-man play about the German philosopher Karl Marx played by Satchit Puranik. Written by Uttam Gada and directed by Manoj Shah, the play depicts an imaginary visit by Marx to Kalbadevi, the hypercapitalist area of Mumbai, India. The play tried to introduce to a commercially-minded Gujarati community the ideas of a radical critic of capitalist society, in a style that adopts song, dance, repartee, and interactive badinage with the audience to make his complex ideas more suitable to the taste and cultural background of local audiences.

Karl Marx in Kalbadevi was successful and has had hundreds of performances, but received mixed reviews from theatre critics. It was praised for Puranik's performance and for presenting complex ideas simply but criticised for its script.

== Background ==
Uttam Gada drew his original inspiration for Karl Marx in Kalbadevi from Howard Zinn's 1999 play Marx in Soho. Zinn had imagined what might happen were Marx to wander around Manhattan's Soho. Manoj Shah described having had a 'lightbulb moment', wondering what would happen if Mumbai dhandhadaari—Gujarati-speaking merchants—were exposed to the ideas of Marx. He passed on to Gada the idea of picturing Marx wandering about an Indian neighbourhood famous for its dedication to capitalist ventures.

Karl Marx in Kalbadevi premiered at the National Centre for the Performing Arts, Mumbai, on 22 March 2013.

== Plot ==
Believing a life without travel is no life at all, Karl Marx is overcome by the urge to globetrot. He rules out the classic countries that had adopted his ideas for his journey, Russia and China: Russia's weather is too cold, and in China he would have run up against the formidable language barrier of Chinese. He decides to visit India, indifferent to warnings of the dangers of venturing south. He chooses India because he had heard something of the social activism of Mahatma Gandhi. The fact also that the country had two communist parties, one of which had been named after him, stirs his curiosity. He is also spurred by a desire to clear his name of what he views as unfounded allegations that he himself is a Marxist.

At the outset, we are shown an apparently lifeless dummy figure, sprawled on the floor, with just a leg raised and propped on a chair next to a table decorated with several books, such as Das Kapital and the Communist Manifesto. The figure suddenly comes to life. A light-hearted overture allows the audience to take on a key theme throughout the play which relies on an implicit parallel between words as tokens and money: both secure meaning and value by the mechanisms of circulation, and both shape our lives. The brochure introducing the play itself alerts the theatre-goer to the intention of its author to have Marx "comfort the disturbed, and disturb the comfortable". Later in the play Marx alludes to the difference between wearing a Rolex or a Timex - the former flashes the message your time (for success) has come, whereas the latter simply tells you what time it is.

On arriving in Mumbai, Marx is keen to visit Mani Bhavan, a museum dedicated to Gandhi's memory, only to find the gatekeeper, a stickler for the details of correct opening times, will not let him in. He crosses paths with a Gujarati named Manoj Shah who offers to act as his guide, taking him for a tour round Kalbadevi, the heartland of Gujarati capitalism. They proceed next to the Mumba Devi Temple. There, Marx observes acutely the odd contrast between those who visit the temple to pray to the god for his beneficial intervention, and the beggars who sit outside entreating these same religious visitors for some pittance to help them get through the day.

After dining at a notable local restaurant, the Bhagat Tarachand, the two end up back in a pied-à-terre. Located in a crowded chawl, the gritty realities of this building and the impoverished quarter around it prompt Marx, sprinkling his memories with bits of German and French to underline his cosmopolitan background, in Berlin, London and the United States: he explains to the audience that the theatre manager wouldn't let him talk unless he could entertain the audience with interesting stories, and thus he recalls also his early life of humble dwellings, his ambitions to become a poet, his drinking days as a student in Trier, the penury and incomprehension of even his family he had to put up with as he struggled to finish his masterpiece, Das Kapital in London's Soho. This section on reminiscences is salted with an interactive question-and-answer set of exchanges with the audience.

The play is peppered, according to critic Deepa Mohan, with memorable one-liners, such as the "smallest one-word joke in China is 'Marxism'."

== Reception ==
Karl Marx in Kalbadevi is one of Shah's long-running productions.

Deepa Gahlot thought Satchit Puranik, with his thick shock of hair and bushy beard, bore a striking similarity to the historic Marx. The director, Shah, thought that a play in Gujarati, which belonged to the genre of experimental theatre, had little prospect of reaching more than a handful of viewers, and that it would play at most for just a few nights. Contrary to expectations, however, the piece proved a great success, being performed hundreds of times in Gujarati and in Hinglish, a dialect of English influenced by Hindi.

For Gahlot, there is a tongue-in-cheek tone in Shah's production, with its bold sermonizing about the virtues of socialism before an audience of dyed-in-the-wool capitalists. The basic facts of Marx's life and thinking are set forth woven with homespun truths, iconoclasm and intellectual challenges to preconceived ideas, all threaded with a comic vein. One defect, she argues, is that Marx's formidable figure and life tends to swamp its context, the world of Kalbadevi. The piece could be challenged as too simplistic, but some accommodation was necessary if the play was to achieve its aim of hinting to an audience predominantly raised on a greed-is-good ethic that the Marxist analysis of capitalism merited consideration.

Deepa Punjani noted the novelty of introducing into what she considered a rather frivolous tradition of theatrical entertainment, a one-man show in which the global figure of Karl Marx comments on what he sees in the Gujarati world. She expressed reservations about the script for warping Marx's ideas by oversimplification. This was a consequence, she argued, of the author's endeavouring to make Marx's radical ideas less threatening for a Gujarati audience, whose culture was marked by a fascination with money-making. This when, after 2008 financial crisis, Marx's analysis of capitalism, as opposed to his discredited political theories, began to attract renewed interest. Marx is made to recognise the virtues of venture capitalism and technological innovations, for example. The monologue unfolds at breakneck speed, sprinkled with humorous quips, if at times rather repetitively. Despite these shortcomings, she advised theatre-goers to see the play and suggested that the author and director of the play be more adventurous in future attempts to introduce provocative material for the Gujarati stage.

While criticising the unnecessary mentions of the director Manoj Shah in the play and the hollowness of the title, Utpal Bhayani praised the play's integration of Marx's personal life and his works. He felt the difficult ideas from Marx's magnum opus Das Kapital and Communist Manifesto, which he co-authored with his lifetime friend Friedrich Engels, were presented interestingly. Shujaat Mirza appreciated the play's bold attempt to enlist techniques of playful banter, song and dance in order to familiarize the audience with Marx's ideas, which are shorn of any overbearing ideological tone, but he faulted it for glossing over "how Marx was appreciative of the [British] colonial enterprise in India as a way to the emancipation of Indians", but, at the same time, reminded his readers that Marx's ideas played an important role in anti-imperialist struggles. In this sense, he assesses Satchit Puranik's one-man act as a 'bravura performance' with what is a 'mixed bag' in terms of presenting the real Karl Marx.

Deepa Mohan, writing for Citizen Matters, gave it a net positive rating, describing the use of lighting effects, according to the topics or events touched on, as excellent. Also merit-worthy was the astute taped musical accompaniment which complemented the actor's words. Manoj Shah's production was subtle in the way it engaged the actor to speak, in what was admittedly a long monologue that might strain people's powers of attention (90 minutes), in such a way that the talk gave an impression of lively improvisation. The play could, she suggested, otherwise be improved by cutting back the text, to ensure brevity where, at times, the speech seems to drift.
