= Master Phoolmani =

1999 Gujarati play

- Official poster
- Written by: Chandrakant Shah
- Characters: Manilal; Vasantlal; Sumanlal; Bhatia Seth
- Original language: Gujarati
- Genre: Musical comedy

Premiere
- Date premiered: 15 November 1999
- Place premiered: Horniman Circle Gardens, Mumbai
- Official website

Master Phoolmani is a 1999 Gujarati-language musical comedy play that was written by Chandrakant Shah and directed by Manoj Shah. The play was adapted from Satish Alekar's work Begum Barve (1979), which Chandrakant Shah rewrote from a Gujarati viewpoint to be more relatable to Gujarati audience. The play, which is one of Manoj Shah's best-known works, was first staged on 15 November 1999 at Horniman Circle Gardens, Mumbai. It was influenced by the Bhangavadi (Note: The term 'Bhagwadi' was derived from the Bhangwadi neighborhood in Mumbai, which was a centre of theatre activities in early 1870s. Male actors impersonated females because acting was a social taboo and females could not participate in the theatre. The actors had to speak dialogues loudly so whole audience could hear. Music, dance and singing were an integral part of theatre.) theatre style, and depicts the story of two out-of-work theatre actors who enter the fantasy of two aged bachelor clerks.

== Background ==
Master Phoolmani was adapted by Chandrakant Shah from Satish Alekar's work Begum Barve (1979); Shah adapted the script to have Gujarati viewpoints so it would be more relatable to Gujarati audience. The play's premiere, which was directed and produced by Manoj Shah under his company Ideas Unlimited, was held on 15 November 1999 at Horniman Circle Gardens, Mumbai, during the Prithvi Theatre Festival. As of 2015, over 100 performances of the play, which has 29 songs, have been held. Bhupen Khakhar painted the play's backdrop.

== Plot ==
Master Phoolmani is about people who create fantasies to contest the harsh realities of the world. Manilal, an actor who uses the stage name Phoolmani, is famous for playing female roles. He is stuck with Bhatia Seth, the owner of a theatre troupe, who provides him employment whilst physically and emotionally abusing. Sumanlal and Vasantlal, government clerks who are bachelors with little chance of getting married, hate their lives and are waiting for a miracle to happen. In an intertwined fantasy, Manilal turns into a heroine named Vanlata and marries Sumanlal. They enjoy their fantasy and Manilal starts believing he is pregnant with Sumanlal's child. Sumanlal also believes he is going to be the father of Vanlata's child. However, Bhatia Seth and Vasantlal shatter their fantasy and the play, which takes a tragic turn.

== Cast ==
The original cast included:

- Chirag Vohra as Manilal/Phoolmani/Vanlata
- Parag Jhaveri as Vasantlal
- Utkarsh Mazumdar as Sumanlal
- Manoj Shah as Bhatia Seth

== Reception ==
Master Phoolmani was a great success and was performed hundreds of times. Utpal Bhayani called the play a "fulfilling experience" and gave credit to the writer, director and actors. He praised the actors for their performances and especially praised the production team for authentically and accurately recreating the old Gujarati theatre experience, including the use of old songs, live music performances and old properties. Dhwanil Parekh praised the "live presentation" of the songs and cited the play as a milestone in Gujarati theatre.
