= Urmi Desai =

Indian linguist

Urmi Ghanshyam Desai
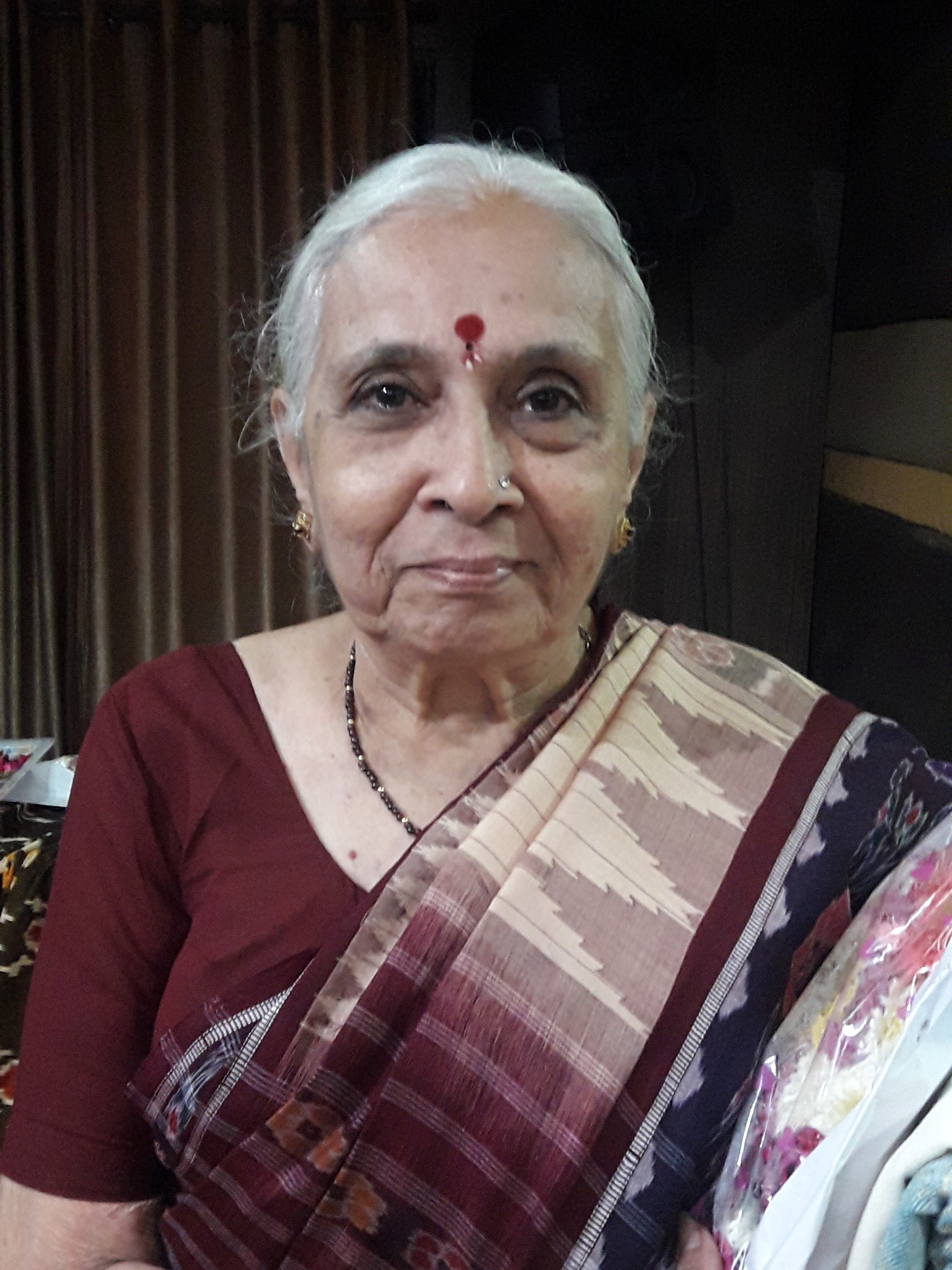
- At Ahmedabad, March 2018
- Born: 5 April 1938 (age 88); Mumbai, India
- Occupations: Writer, linguist
- Spouse: Ghanshyam Desai (m. 1965)
- Writing career
- Language: Gujarati
- Notable works: Gujarati Bhashana Angasadhak Pratyayo (1967); Gujarati Vyakaran Na Baso Varsh (2014)
- Notable awards: Sahitya Akademi Award (2017)

Urmi Ghanshyam Desai (born 1938) is a Gujarati writer and linguist from Gujarat, India. She received the Sahitya Akademi Award in 2017 for her critical work Gujarati Vyakaran Na Baso Varsh (published in 2014).

== Biography ==
She was born on 5 April 1938 in Mumbai to her mother, Rambhabahen, and her father, Kameshwar Vyas. Her family originates from Chorvad. After matriculation in 1955, she completed her Bachelor of Arts (1961) and Master of Arts (1963) degrees on Gujarati and Sanskrit subjects. She received her PhD in 1967 under the supervision of Harivallabh Bhayani for her research work Gujarati Bhashana Angasadhak Pratyayo. In 1969, she completed her Diploma in Linguistics. She married Ghanshyam Desai, a Gujarati short story writer, in 1965.

From 1965 to 1972, she worked at Mumbai University as a research assistant in the Linguistics department. From 1973 to 1981, she worked at the Mahatma Gandhi Memorial Research Center and Library as a research officer. From 1984 to 1987, she worked in the post-graduate department of SNDT Women's University.

She is considered one of the pioneer linguists in the Gujarati language, and has published several books such as Bhashashastra Shu Chhe? (1976), Gujarati Bhashana Angasadhak Pratyayo (1972), Vyakaran Vimarsh (1992), Let us Learn to write Gujarati (1999), Bhashanushang (2003), and Rupashastra - Ek Parichay (2007). She has also translated Prabodh Pandit's research work Prakrut Bhasha into Gujarati.

== See also ==
- List of Gujarati-language writers
