= Uncho Parvat, Undi Khin =

1993 Gujarati play by Manilal Dwivedi

- Cover page
- Original language: Gujarati
- Written by: Dhirubhai Thaker
- Subject: Manilal Dwivedi
- Genre: Biographical play
- Setting: 19th-century Bombay and Gujarat

Uncho Parvat, Undi Khin (transl. Lofty Mountain, Cavernous Valley) is a biographical play by Dhirubhai Thaker based on life of Manilal Dwivedi. It was published in 1993.

== Background ==
Dhirubhai Thaker writes in the Preface of the play: The facts concerning Manilal's public and private life, his views, his ideals, and other resources were available to me, but I didn't know how difficult it is to turn that material into a drama until I was actually writing the drama. It was published in 1993.

The play was staged under direction of Janak Dave who had made some changes for stage production.

== Content ==
The play is based on the life of Manilal Dwivedi and features narrator. The playwright has also used the works including poems and ghazals by Manilal in the play.

== Reception ==
The play was chosen for the prize among 11 plays nominated for the play prize by Batubhai Umarvadiya Trust. Critic Vinod Adhvaryu notes, "As Dhirubhai has researched Manilal Dwivedi's literature very deeply, the play is accurate and true in its details". On 28 July 1992, theatre critic S. D. Desai wrote in The Times of India that the play lacks central conflict, its dialogues are verbose and its plot is just 'episodic'. Hasmukh Baradi admires the play and writes, "the play Uncho Parvat, Undi Khin is a product of out own land, as it follows our own tradition of the theatre and employs that tradition in a modern way".

== See also ==
- Jal Jal Mare Patang
