= Yun Hota Toh Kya Hota =

- Directed by: Naseeruddin Shah
- Written by: Uttam Gada
- Produced by: Shabbir Boxwala
- Starring: Konkona Sen Sharma; Irrfan Khan; Jimmy Sheirgill; Ayesha Takia; Paresh Rawal; Saroj Khan; Boman Irani; Ratna Pathak Shah; Ankur Khanna
- Cinematography: Hemant Chaturvedi
- Music by: Viju Shah
- Distributed by: Times Music
- Release date: 21 July 2006
- Running time: 118 minutes
- Country: India
- Language: Hindi

Yun Hota Toh Kya Hota (transl. What If?) is a 2006 Indian Hindi-language drama film directed by Naseeruddin Shah. The film stars Konkona Sen Sharma, Irrfan Khan, Ayesha Takia, Jimmy Sheirgill, Paresh Rawal, Boman Irani and Saroj Khan. The film explores four stories which eventually become intertwined with 9/11.

== Plot ==
The film follows four interconnected stories involving six people linked only by their connection to the planes involved in the September 11 attacks.

- Tilottama Das-Punj is happily married to Hemant, whom she met online. Their life together is interrupted when Hemant must travel to the United States for work. Left behind with her controlling mother-in-law, who discourages her from contacting him, Tilottama eventually manages to join her husband in the US. After narrowly missing one of the doomed flights, she is reunited with Hemant with the help of a good Samaritan.
- Salim Rajabali, the wealthy son of a powerful godmother, becomes embroiled in a murder investigation and discovers that his girlfriend, Namrata, has been unfaithful. Before matters escalate further, he flees the country and travels to New York. While visiting the World Trade Center to meet a friend, he is killed when a hijacked plane crashes into the tower.
- Rahul Bhide is a poor but academically gifted student who is delighted to receive an offer to study at a prestigious university in the US. His happiness is overshadowed by financial difficulties, and he is close to abandoning his plans until his friend Khushboo helps fund his education. Rahul boards one of the doomed flights and dies in the attack.
- Rajubhai Patel works as an event organiser for a popular foreign television programme. His former girlfriend, Tara, mortgages her house so that their daughter, Payal, can visit him. Rajubhai and Payal later board the doomed flights and do not survive.

== Cast ==
- Irrfan Khan as Salim Rajaballi
- Jimmy Sheirgill as Hemant Punj
- Konkona Sen Sharma as Tilottama Das Punj
- Paresh Rawal as Rajubhai Patel
- Ayesha Takia as Khushboo Modi
- Ankur Khanna as Rahul Bhide
- Boman Irani as DCP Paul
- Ratna Pathak Shah as Tara Gandhi
- Saroj Khan as Amma, Salim's mother
- Meghna Malik as Kalpa
- Utkarsh Mazumdar as Dhirubhai Gandhi
- Karan Khanna as Javed Rajaballi
- Suhasini Mulay as Namrata
- Imaad Shah as Joy
- Trishla Patel as Natasha
- Sameer Shaikh as Nitin
- Rajat Kapoor as US Consulate Officer
- Ranvir Shorey as Sports Bar Manager
- Shahana Goswami as Payal, Tara's daughter
- Tinnu Anand as Deva
- Ravi Baswani as Mr. Punj, Hemant’s father
- Makarand Deshpande as Man at cemetery
- Suhas Bhalekar as Rahul's father
- Suhita Thatte as Zubeda
- Anupam Shyam as Inspector Ranade

== Music ==
Yun Hota Toh Kya Hota

Soundtrack album by Viju Shah
- Released: 1 June 2006
- Genre: Feature film soundtrack
- Label: Times Music

1. "Ek Bar Jana America Janab" - Devraj Gadhavi(Nano Dero), Keerthi Sagathia, Javed Ali, Madhushree
2. "Ek Baar Jaana America" v2 - Keerti Sagathia, Joy Barua
3. "Yado Me Aksar Aate Rahe" - Shreya Ghoshal, Shaan
4. "Yu Hota To Kya Hota" - Sunidhi Chauhan, Kunal Ganjawala
5. "Pyaar Hai" - Sowmya Raoh

== See also ==
- List of cultural references to the September 11 attacks
