= Paralysis (novel) =

1967 Gujarati novel by Chandrakant Bakshi

- Author: Chandrakant Bakshi
- Original title: પેરિલિસિસ
- Translator: Chandrakant Bakshi
- Language: Gujarati
- Publication date: 1967
- Publication place: India
- English publication date: 1981
- OCLC: 743467531
- Dewey Decimal: 891.473

Paralysis is a 1967 Gujarati novel by Indian writer Chandrakant Bakshi. The novel tells the story of a widowed professor, and deals with themes such as loneliness, defeat, detachment, and ennui.

== Publication history ==
The novel was first published in 1967. Bakshi translated it into English and published this version in 1981.

== Characters ==
The principle characters of the novel are:

- Aram Shah – a widowed university professor
- Marisa – Aram's daughter
- Asika Deep – a matron in mission hospital

== Plot ==
The novel's protagonist is Aram Shah, a widowed university professor who raised his daughter, Marisa, on his own after his wife died during her second pregnancy. At the outset of the novel, he wakes up during a visit to the mountains and ponders the meaning of three dreams he had had overnight—of lions frail with age; of a palace reeking with disinfectant; and of a museum among whose holdings is a jar with an embryo. The intensity of his feelings induces a stroke, and he reawakens, paralysed, in a small regional hospital, where he is tenderly cared for by a resident matron, Asika. There, he recalls the death of his daughter, who married a Christian, George Vargis, and then committed suicide. It was grief over this incident that drove him to the hillside station where the story begins. Asika is also burdened with memories of her past and of widowhood. She is middle-aged like Aram, and the two are drawn together, as though they were a couple of half-dead people finding in each other's company a glimmer of life's renewal. He is soon discharged, but cannot bid Asika farewell, since she has disappeared into the foothills. Instead of taking a plane home, he returns to the site where he had the stroke, and wanders through it under the beating sun.

== Reception and criticism ==
The book was translated into Marathi, Russian and English. It was included in the curricula of the Bombay University and the Gujarat University. The Marathi translation was included in the curriculum of the SNDT Women's University for a BA course. Bombay TV broadcast a play based on the novel.

Paralysis' plot includes themes such as loneliness, defeat, detachment and ennui. Gujarati critic Chandrakant Topiwala praised the novel for its "skilled narrative designs".
