= Chandrakant Bakshi =

Gujarati writer

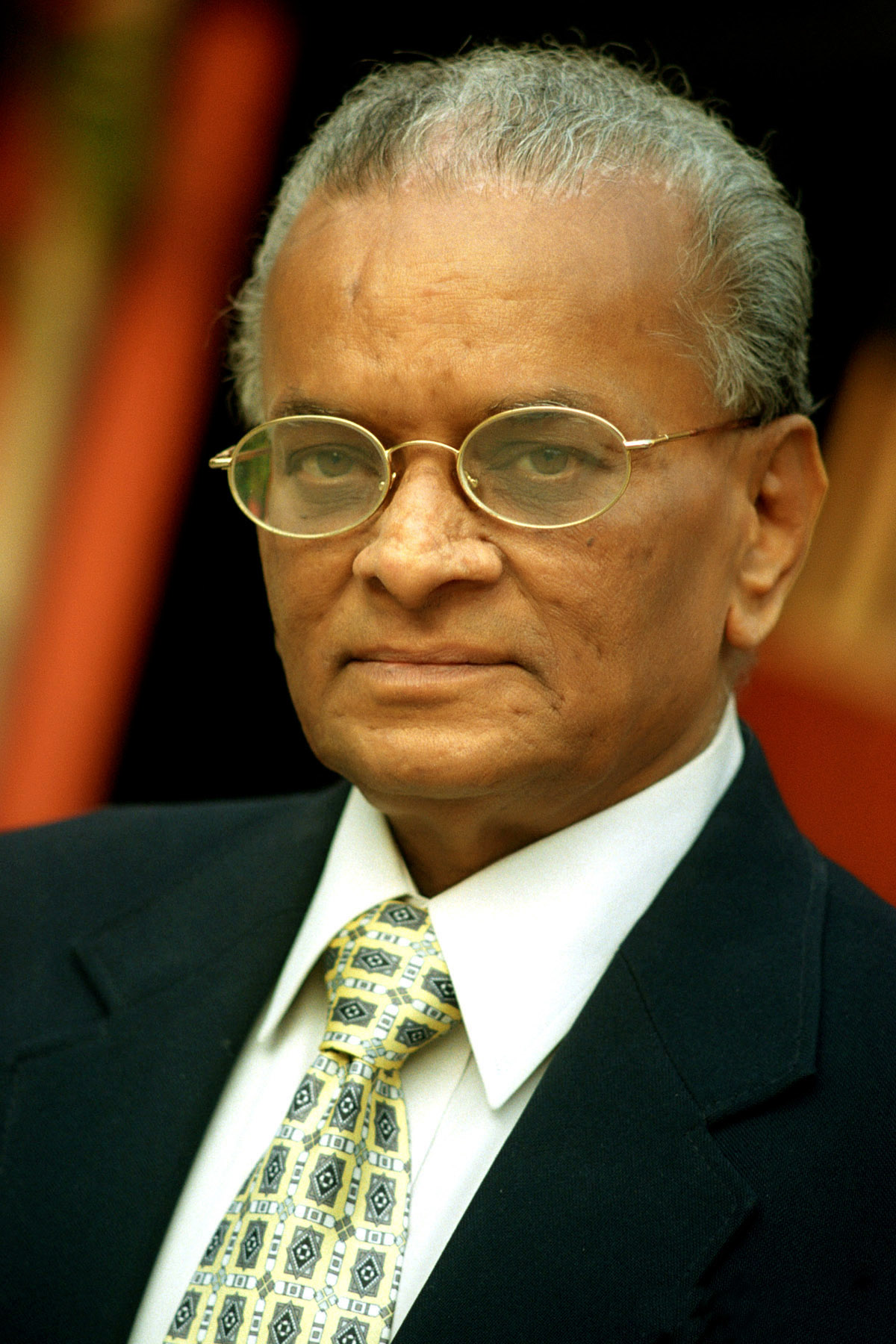
- Bakshi at Kolkata, 2003
- Born: 20 August 1932; Palanpur, Gujarat, India
- Died: 25 March 2006 (aged 73); Ahmedabad, Gujarat, India
- Occupation: Author
- Spouse: Bakula Bakshi
- Children: Reeva
- Writing career
- Language: Gujarati
- Notable work: Paralysis (1967)

Chandrakant Keshavlal Bakshi was an Indian Gujarati-language author from Gujarat, India and a former Sheriff of Mumbai. He was known for his bold and new concepts in writing during his time in Gujarati literature. He is also addressed as Bakshi or Bakshibabu. Born in Palanpur, he completed higher education and had a business in Calcutta. He started writing there and later moved to Mumbai for his teaching career. He wrote 178 books, and wrote extensively in newspaper columns.

== Life ==
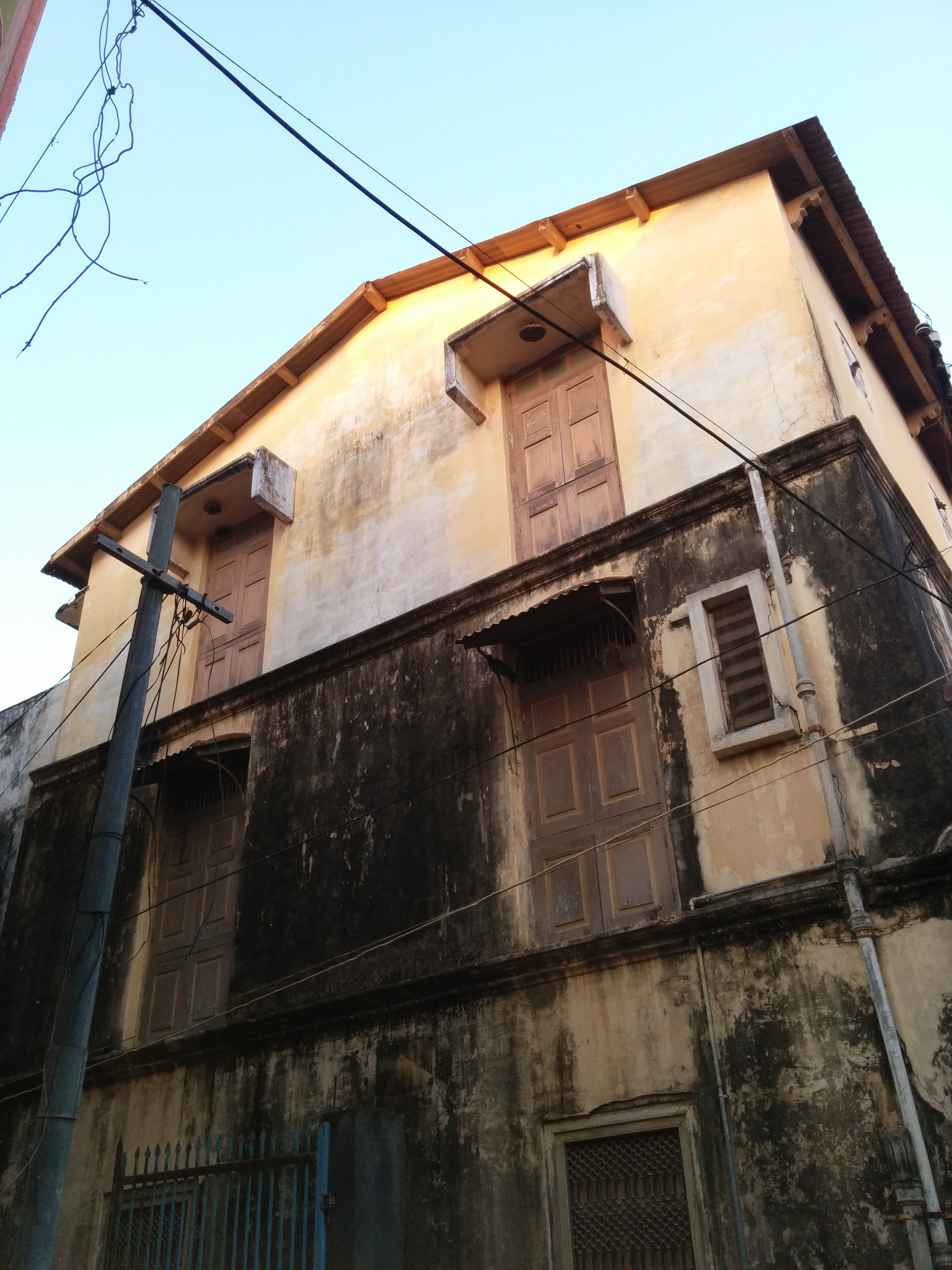
Bakshi's home in Palanpur where he was born

Chandrakant Bakshi was born on 20 August 1932 at Palanpur (now in Banaskantha district, Gujarat). He was second child of Keshavlal Bakshi and Chanchalben, a Gujarati Jain family. He completed his primary education in Palanpur. He completed a Bachelor of Arts in 1952 from St. Xavier's College, Calcutta. He moved to Calcutta (now Kolkata) where he studied for an LL.B. in 1956 and an M.A. in History in 1963.

He was in the textile business for twelve years and had a garment shop in Calcutta. He wrote his first short story Makan Nu Bhut (Ghost of the House) at this shop. He published his first book Padgha Doobi Gaya (Sunken Echoes) in 1957. In 1969, he moved to Mumbai and settled there and started teaching history at Raheja College. He joined Mithibai College as a professor of history and politics from 1970 to 1980. He also taught postgraduate students at the University of Bombay and was its senate member. He was the principal of L. S. Rajani Arts and Commerce College from 1980 to 1982 and retired from there. Later he accepted writing and journalism as his career. He wrote columns for several dailies and magazines. He also served as an adviser to Divya Bhaskar daily.

He was appointed to the ceremonial post of Sheriff of Mumbai in 1999 by the Government of Maharashtra. He died on 25 March 2006 in Ahmedabad following a heart attack.

== Writing ==
=== Style ===
Bakshi prepared only one draft for his writings. His language was a mix-up of Gujarati and Urdu words. His novels and stories had impact of existentialism, his characters are suffering and frustrated yet surviving. Ekra (1963) is one such example. In his novels, the story was a chief element. He rejected social and literary taboos in his novels but his works were concerned for readers. He freely borrowed words and phrases from Hindi, Urdu and English in his works. He wrote historical fiction like Atitvan and Ayanvritta. His short stories have themes like complexities of urban life, emotional outbursts, and the atmosphere of war. He wrote extensively on history and culture. According to Rediff, his writing was 'sharp and brutal' when he criticised people he disliked. His biography Bakshinama was partially published in serialised form in Gujarati daily Samkalin. Some parts were not published due to its violent imagery like urinating on the dead body of his enemy.

=== Works ===
He is best known for his sixth novel Paralysis published in 1967, which revolves around protagonist Professor Shah who becomes paralyzed and reminisces about his past life events in hospital. The novel is translated in Marathi, English and Russian. Another well known non-fiction book he authored is મહાજાતિ ગુજરાતી (Gujarati - A great race), a book on the traditions, characteristics and behavior of the various castes of Gujarat.

He authored 178 books, including 17 books on history and culture, 26 novels, 15 collections of short stories, six books on politics, eight travelogues, two plays and 25 books on varied subjects, besides his autobiography Bakshinama.

He has also written extensively in newspapers and 15 of his books have been translated into Hindi, Marathi, English and other languages.

His works are as follows:

=== Short stories ===
Name	Year	English meaning
Pyar	1958	Love
Ek sanjh ni mulaquat	1961	Meeting at one evening
Mira	1965	
Mashal	1968	Lamp
Kramashaha	1971	To be continued
Ketlic American vartao	1972	Some American stories
Bakshini ketlic vartao	1972	Some stories by Bakshi
Pashchim	1976	West
Aajni soviet vartao	1977	Soviet stories of today
Chandrakant bakshi ni shreshth vartao	1977	Greatest stories by Chandrakant Bakshi
139 vartao-1	1987	139 stories-First part
139 vartao-2	1987	139 stories-Second part
Chandrakant bakshi : Sadabahar vartao	2002	Chandrakant Bakshi : Evergreen stories
Bakshi ni vartao(Akademi)	has not been published	Stories of Bakshi(Academy)
Kutti		Bitch (female dog)

=== Novels ===
Name	Year	English meaning
Padgha dubi gaya	1957	Sunken Echoes
Roma	1959	Roma
Ekaltana kinara	1959	Shores of Solitude
Aakar	1963	Shapes
Ek ane Ek	1965	One and one
Paralysis	1967	Paralysis
Jatakkatha	1969	Jataka Tales
Honeymoon	1971	Honeymoon
Ayanvrutt	1972	The Equator, Transition of events from Prehistoric to Historic era spanning over 10,000 years narrated in fictional style
Atitavan	1973	In the Timberland of Ancient Time, a sequel to Ayanvrutt, yet another novel blending fiction and historical account
Lagnani aagli rate	1973	On the night prior to marriage
Zindani	1974	The prison
Surkhab	1974	Pelican
Aakashe kahyu	1975	Sky told
Reef Marina	1976	Reef Marina
Yatra no ant (translated)	1976	End of the tour
Dishatarang	1979	Wave of the direction
Baki raat	1979	Remaining night
Hatheli par Badbaki	1981	Deduction on palm
Hu, Konarak Shah	1983	I, Konarak Shah
Lili nasoma Pankhar	1984	Translated as "Lost Illusions", literally meaning Autumn in every leaf, translated as पतझड हर पत्ते में in Hindi
Vansh	1986	Descent
Priy Nikki	1987	Dear Nikki
Chorus	1991	
Maru naam taru naam	1995	My name Your name
Samkaal	1998	Contemporaneous

==== Columns ====
He wrote weekly columns in several Gujarati newspapers and magazines including Divya Bhaskar, Gujarat Samachar, Sandesh, Mid-Day, Chitralekha.

==== Adaptations ====
His popular short story 'એક સાંજની મુલાકાત ... ' (One evening visit) was adapted into a telefilm "Ek Shaam Ki Mulakaat" by Tigmanshu Dhulia. It was the first episode of acclaimed Indian television series Star Bestsellers, aired on Star Plus in 1999–2000. The main leads were played by Irrfan Khan and Tisca Chopra.

== Controversies ==
His short story Kutti was banned by the Government of Gujarat and an arrest warrant was issued against him; so he fought a court case against the government. They later withdrew all charges against him.

He criticised Indian politician, Bal Thackeray in his column and was asked to apologise by Thackeray's party members. He refused and never did.

== In popular culture ==
His autobiography Bakshinama was adapted into a Gujarati play, Hu Chandrakant Bakshi, by Shishir Ramavat. It was directed by Manoj Shah and starred Pratik Gandhi in the lead role.

== Personal life ==
He married Bakula, who died in 2002. Their daughter Reeva Bakshi lives in Ahmedabad. His elder brother Lalit and younger brother Bakul, a retired I. A. S. officer, are also columnists.
