= Bhai Bhaiya Aur Brother =

- Genre: Comedy
- Written by: Niren Bhatt
- Directed by: Rajan Waghdhare
- Creative director: Deven Bhojani
- Narrated by: Chirag Vohra
- Country of origin: India
- Original language: Hindi
- No. of seasons: 1
- No. of episodes: 51

Production
- Producers: Vipul Amrutlal Shah and Deven Bhojani
- Cinematography: Shankar Singh
- Editors: Ashok Rathod; Aajay Kumar; Shrichand Dasnam
- Running time: 20 minutes

Original release
- Network: SAB TV
- Release: 4 June – 10 August 2012

Bhai Bhaiya Aur Brother is an Indian comedy television series, which aired on the SAB TV from 4 June 2012 to 10 August 2012.

== Plot ==
A Sindhi family unites after 15 years. Three brothers, who have been living separately with their own individual families, meet at middle brother's house in Mumbai. All are raised in three contrasting cultures. Younger brother's family has come from London and older brother's family is from a small village of Gujarat. The series progresses through the lighter situations mostly and warm and sensitive situations occasionally faced by all these peculiar characters, with their own individual quirks, likes and dislikes. How the families of the three brothers get into a relationship-how they need to be marginalized–how they need to learn something from one another-while embarking on a happy relationship is the main premise of the show.

== Cast ==
- Swati Chitnis as Jamuna Mahendra Chawla
- Muni Jha as Mahendra Chawla
- Chirag Vohra as Rajeev Mahendra Chawla
- Sooraj Thapar as Anil Mahendra Chawla
- Vrajesh Hirjee as Sameer Mahendra Chawla
- Muskaan Mihani as Jennifer Sameer Chawla
- Dimple Shah as Jyotsna Anil Chawla
- Shweta Choudhary as Juhi Rajeev Chawla
- Harsh Shah as Chunnu Anil Chawla
- Shivansh Kotia as Saral Rajeev Chawla
- Sadhil Kapoor as Tom Sameer Chawla
