= Ghanshyam Desai =

Gujarati short story writer and editor from Gujarat, India (1934–2010)

Ghanshyam Occhavlal Desai was a Gujarati short story writer and editor from Gujarat, India.

== Life ==
Ghanshyam Desai was born on 4 June 1934 in Devgadh Baria (now in Dahod district, Gujarat) where he completed primary and secondary education. He went to Bombay (now Mumbai) and studied B. A. in Gujarati in 1954. He worked as a teacher at Gurukul High School, Songadh for two years. In 1960, he completed M. A. in Gujarati.

He worked as an assistant editor of Samarpan magazine (published by Bharatiya Vidya Bhavan) from 1962 to 1969 and later as an editor from 1970. When Samarpan merged with Navneet and became Navneet Samarpan, he became its editor in 1980 and worked there until retirement.

Desai married Urmi Desai, a Gujarati writer and linguist, in 1965. He died on 29 April 2010.

== Works ==
Desai was a modernist experimental story writer. In most of his stories, the narration starts with 'Hu' (transl. I). His short story collection Tolu (1977) was awarded by the Government of Gujarat. His notable stories include 'Tolu', ’Kagdo’, ‘Gokaljino Velo’, 'Leelo Phango', 'Ren', 'Professor: Ek Safar'. Bandh Barna (2014) is his posthumously published story collection. His children's story collection Maulik Katha Mala (1990) was also awarded by the Gujarat Sahitya Akademi. His other children's story collection is Abhinav Katha Mala (1994).

== See also ==
- List of Gujarati-language writers
