= Mareez =

Indian Gujarati-language poet (1917–1980)

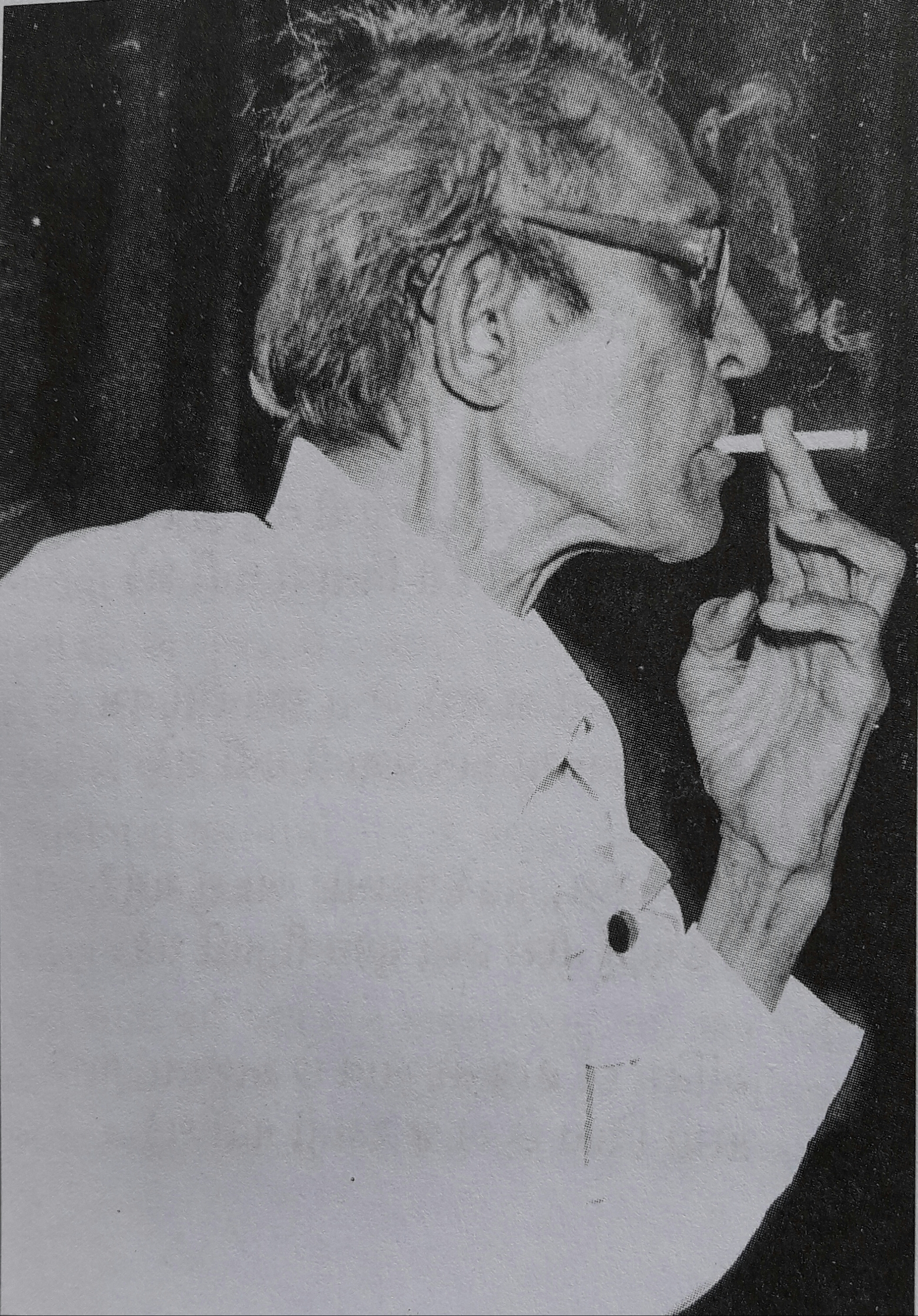
- Born: Abbas Abdul Ali Vasi; 22 February 1917; Surat, Gujarat, India
- Died: 19 October 1983 (aged 66); Mumbai, Maharashtra, India
- Occupations: Poet, journalist
- Writing career
- Pen name: Mareez

Abbas Abdul Ali Vasi (22 February 1917 – 19 October 1983), popularly known as Mareez, was an Indian poet of Gujarati language, mainly popular for his Ghazals. He is popularly known as Ghalib of Gujarat. He left studies in young age and started working in rubber shoe factory. Having been interested in poetry, he took up journalism but remained financially unstable throughout his life. He wrote Ghazals published in collections but many of his works remained uncredited which he sold during his financial difficulties. His popularity escalated after his death.

== Early life ==
Abbas Vasi was born in a Dawoodi Bohra family on 22 February 1917 in Pathanwada area of Surat, British India to Abdul Ali and Amatullah Vasi. His father was a teacher in Madrasah Taiyabiyah School, Surat. He was third among eleven siblings. His mother died of tuberculosis when he was young. He studied only till second grade as he was not interested in studies. Noticing his disinterest, his father discontinued his studies and sent him to Mumbai to work.

From young age, Abbas was interested in Marsiyas as his elder sister Rukhaiya used to recite Marasiyas written by Urdu poets, Anis and Dabeer. He wrote his first poem on the first birthday of his cousin when he was fourteen years old. He used to go to Zhapa Bazar in Surat where the group of people interested in Urdu and Gujarati Ghazals gathered on regular basis. He met Ameen Azad (1913-1992) there whom he acknowledged as his teacher or Ustad. Amin Azad named him, Mareez.

== Career ==
He went to Mumbai in 1932 and started working at Universal Rubber Works which manufactured rubber shoes. Though his earnings were not good he used to spend them on books. He fell in love with his cousin. His marriage proposal was rejected by her father because of his financial condition and habits of smoking and drinking. He was deeply shocked by the incident.

He left the rubber shoe factory and started working as journalist. He also briefly worked as a salesman of bookseller, Shrafali and Sons, Bhindi Bazar, Bombay. He had edited a special edition of Gulshan-e-Dawoodi. He worked briefly with Vatan and Matrubhumi dailies. Vatan stopped publishing following the Partition of India. He published Azaan, Khushbu and Umeed magazines but they were stalled due to financial constraints. His friend and poet, Asim Randeri helped him and he presented his first ever Mushayara, recitation of Ghazals, on All India Radio in Mumbai in 1936. He also worked in Leela, a magazine published by Randeri. He married his wife Sona in 1946 and uncle of his wife, Salehbhai Abdul Kader introduced him to Indian Independence Movement and he participated in Quit India Movement in 1942.

In 1960, he joined as an editor of Insaaf, a weekly of Muslim Dawoodi Bohra community which helped him stabilise financially. He was appointed by Sayyedna Taher Saifuddin, Dā'ī al-Mutlaq of the Dawoodi Bohra. After death of Sayyedna, the weekly stalled so he returned to freelance journalism. In 1964, he was infected with tuberculosis and was admitted to Sarvoday Hospital, Ghatkopar for two months with monetary help of his admirer Pravin Pandya. In 1965, a wealthy person who wanted to be poet hired Mareez to write poems in his own pen name Tabeeb. The book Dard was published in September 1966 causing uproar in literary circles and his admirers resulting in it being withdrawn from the market.

He confined himself to his home in last two years. He was knocked down by speeding auto rickshaw while crossing road just outside his home on 13 October 1983. He had multiple fractures in thigh. He was admitted to hospital in Ghatkopar, Mumbai and underwent successful surgery on 19 October 1983. He died on the same day following heart attack in the hospital. He was buried the next day at Kurla Dawoodi Bohra Kabrastan in Zarimari area.

== Works ==
His pen name, Mareez, literally means "a sick man". He wrote some Nazm and many Ghazals. In his financially difficult times, he sold his creation for which he was not credited. His first collection of Ghazals, Nazm and Muktak; Aagman was published in 1975. He dedicated it to Pravin Pandya. His second collection Nakshaa was published posthumously in 1984. Some of his poetry is published in Disha (1980) along with others. His complete works, Samagra Mareez, was published by his son in 2012. It was edited by Rajesh Vyas 'Miskin'. His religious poetry was published in religious and social magazines. Some of them were later anthologised in Akidat (1991) edited by his son Mohsin Vasi and poet Gulamabbas 'Nashad'.

He also partially translated Urdu poetry, Siqva Jawab E Siqva by Iqbal in Gujarati. He had also written two books, Mazloom-e-Karbala and Hurr dedicated to Imam Hussain which are not available in publication.

Raeesh Maniar published his biography titled Mareez : Astitva Ane Vyaktitva. It was later adapted into a play titled Mareez, directed by Manoj Shah.

== Recognition ==
He was felicitated in 1970 and in 1981 by Mareez Sanman Samiti for his contributions. He was awarded Premanand Suvarna Chandrak posthumously in 1984.

== Personal life ==
He was introduced to Sona in the 1940s and they fell in love. They married in 1946. His son Mohsin was born in 1947 and his daughter Lulua in 1952.
