= Shabda Mara Swabhavma J Nathi =

Shabda Mara Shwabhavma J Nathi
- Coverpage of the book
- Author: Raeesh Maniar
- Cover artist: Ami Maniar
- Language: Gujarati
- Genre: ghazal anthology
- Set in: Mumbai, Maharashtra
- Published: 1998
- Publisher: Vishal Publication
- Publication date: May 1998
- Publication place: India
- Media type: Print
- Pages: 88
- Awards: Shayda Award (2001)
- Dewey Decimal: 891.471
- Preceded by: Kafiyanagar
- Followed by: Aam Lakhvu Karave Alakhni Safar

Shabda Mara Swabhawma J Nathi (Gujarati: શબ્દ મારા સ્વભાવમાં જ નથી) is a Gujarati collection of ghazals written by Raeesh Maniar. The book was published by Vishal Publication, Mumbai in May 1998. Maniar wrote all of the ghazals of this book during his practice as a pediatrics.

== Content ==
The book is consist of 75 ghazals composed in various Arabic metres such as Hazaj, Ramal, Khafif, Majharia, Mutakarib and Mutadarik. The preface of this book has been written by Ramesh Parekh.

== Reception ==
Maniar was awarded by Shayda Award of 2001 for his works Kafiyanagar and Shabda Mara Swabhawma J Nathi.
