= Chirag Vohra =

Indian television, stage and film actor

Chirag Vohra is an Indian television, stage and brilliant film actor. He has acted in films like Tere Bin Laden, Billu, Heyy Babyy, Mangal Pandey: The Rising, Jaago and Rehnaa Hai Terre Dil Mein and Scam 1992 (2020).

He is well known as a theater artist. He performed the role of Phoolmani in the play Master Phoolmani. Other plays he has performed in include Gandhi Ke Godse and Kishan vs Kanhaiya, and Lagan Gadu Chale Adu. His image is used in advertisements, including for Choloromint and Pond's.

He played in many Gujarati and Hindi TV serials including Hum Paanch, Saraswatichandra, Sumit Sambhaal Lega, the role of Bhaiya in the daily comic serial Bhai Bhaiya Aur Brother. He also played in OMG – Oh My God!.

In 2024, Vohra was cast as Mahatma Gandhi in the television series Freedom at Midnight. The actor lost 15kg to portray Gandhi in the role.

== Filmography ==
=== Films ===
Year	Title	Role	Notes
2001	Rehnaa Hai Terre Dil Mein		
2003	Kucch To Hai	Vishal Joshi	
2004	Jaago	Chirag Vora	
2005	Mangal Pandey: The Rising	Bhujavan Shukla	
2007	Heyy Babyy	Arjun	
2009	Billu	Jerry (Movie Director)	
2010	Tere Bin Laden	Lateef	
2012	OMG – Oh My God!	Neighbour	
2016	Tere Bin Laden: Dead Or Alive	Chirag	
2017	Commando 2	Doctor	
2018	Toba Tek Singh	Roshan Lal / Hindu Vakil	Released on ZEE5
2018	Yamla Pagla Deewana Phir Se	Jignesh	
2024	Locha Laapsi		

=== Web series ===
Year	Title	Role	Platform	Notes
2020	Scam 1992	Bhushan Bhatt	Sony LIV	
2022	Crash Course	Mayank Batra	Amazon Prime	
2024	Freedom At Midnight	Mahatma Gandhi	SonyLIV	
