= Anandghan =

Jain monk

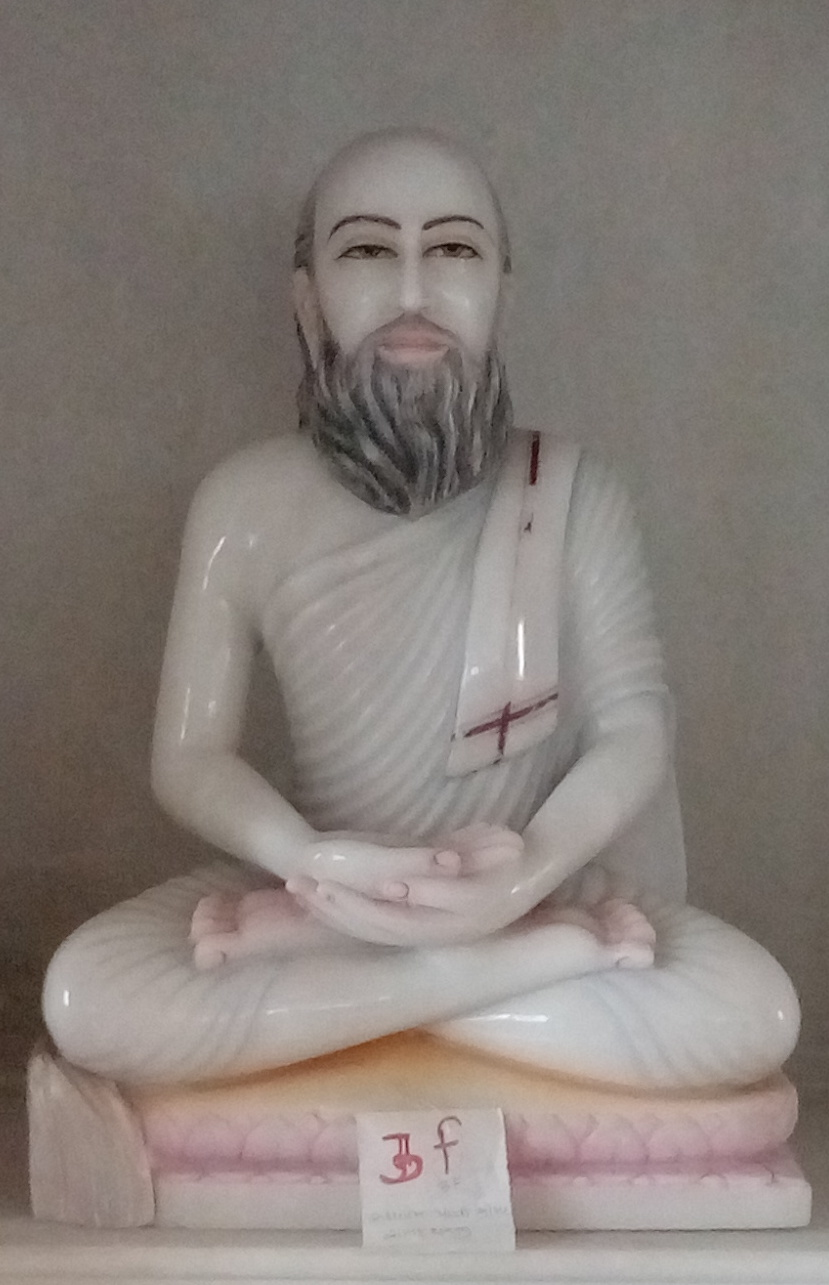
- Idol in library of Lodhadham near Mumbai, Maharashtra

Personal life
- Born: Labhanand; 17th century CE Rajputana (now Rajasthan, India)
- Died: 17th century CE Possibly Medata, Rajputana

Religious life
- Religion: Jainism
- Sect: Śvetāmbara
- Initiation: Labhavijay

Ānandaghana was a 17th-century Śvetāmbara Jain monk, mystical poet and hymnist. Though very little is known about his life, his collection of hymns about philosophy, devotion and spirituality in vernacular languages are popular and still sung in Jain temples.

== Life ==
There is no historical information available about life of Ānandaghana. The majority of information is based in hagiographies and oral history.

He was born in Rajputana (now Rajasthan, India). His dates differs according to sources. Generally 1603 or 1604 is accepted but he could have been born before 1624 according to some estimation. (Note: Bangha and Fynes 2013: xxvii–xxx) His childhood name was Labhanand. He was initiated as a Jain monk and named Lābhavijaya. He belonged to Tapa Gaccha branch of Murtipujaka Śvetāmbara Jainism and was initiated by Panyas Satyavijaya. He stayed in the area of present-day north Gujarat and Rajasthan in India. Legends associate him with Mount Abu and Jodhpur. He is associated with Yashovijay also and said to have met him. He could have died in Medata in Rajasthan as a hall is dedicated to him is there. His death dates varies according to sources. Generally accepted dates are 1673 or 1674 but could have died before 1694. (Note: Bangha and Fynes 2013: xxvii–xxx)

== Works ==
His language is mix of vernacular languages like Gujarati, Rajasthani and Braj. It follows Rajasthani style of diction but is written in medieval Gujarati. It was the time when Bhakti movement was at peak and majority of devotional poets of time wrote in such vernacular languages. His works are focused bhakti (devotion) as well as internal spirituality.

Anandghan Chauvisi is the philosophical treatises which supposed to contain twenty four hymns but contains twenty two. Other two hymns were later added by others. Each verse is dedicated to one of twenty four Jain tirthankaras. The legend tells that he composed these hymns in Mount Abu during his meet with Yashovijay who memorised them.

He is also attributed with authorship of a "Praise to Siddha" in Saṃskṛta.

Anandghan Bahattari is the anthology of hymns which differs in a number of hymns according to different manuscripts. This anthology was formed by 1775 and was transmitted orally as well as the written manuscripts. It contains pada (verses) with different ragas. Some of these verses drawn from other poets like Kabir, Surdas, Banarasidas and others.

== Legacy ==
Yashovijay, the philosopher Jain monk, was influenced by him. He wrote commentary on Chauvisi and also wrote eight verse Ashtapadi dedicated to him.

His hymns are still popular in followers of Jainism as well as non-Jains because they are nonsectarian in nature and put emphasis on internal spirituality. They are sung in Jain temples. They are found in religious hymn collections especially in the collection of Digambara hymns even though he is associated with Śvetāmbara sects. A religious camp organized by Shrimad Rajchandra Mission of Rakesh Jhaveri in 2006 at Dharampur, Gujarat had lectures on Chauvisi. Mahatma Gandhi included his hymn, "One may say Rama, Rahman, Krishna or Shiva, then" in Ashram Bhajanavali, his prayer book.

A Gujarati play Apoorav Khela (2012) based on his life was produced by Dhanvant Shah and directed by Manoj Shah.
