= Uttam Gada =

Indian writer (1948–2020)

Uttam Ravji Gada (1948 – 6 June 2020) was an Indian Gujarati and Hindi play and movie story, screenplay and dialogue writer.

A chartered accountant by training, Uttam Gada found fame with his very long running play directed and enacted by Paresh Rawal called "Maharathi" which played in multiple languages and countries. He also wrote mainstream Bollywood movies such as Khiladi 420 and Yun Hota Toh Kya Hota.

He was nominated for Best Screenplay for the film Khiladi 420 in 2001 for the Screen Awards in India.

He died on 6 June 2020 in San Francisco, USA from complications due to chronic lymphocytic leukemia.

== Published works ==
=== Plays ===
Full length

- Raafda
- Reshami Tezab
- Maharathi
- Mulraj Mansion
- Chiranjeev
- Vish Rajani
- Pankh Vinana Patangiyan
- Kaya Kalp
- Mahapurush
- Hun Rima Baxi !
- Sathwaro
- Double Savari
- Shirachhed
- Kamla
- Dikri Vahal No Dariyo
- Orange Juice
- Jashrekha
- Tsunami
- Lakhsmi Poojan
- Dear Father
- Arre Vahu ! Have Thayun Bahu
- Five Star Aunty
- Whatsup
- Yugpurush
- Karl Marx in Kalbadevi

Short

- Hairpin
- Bhinan Paanan
- Rango
- Security
- System
- Positive Thinking
- Fire Wall
- Red Sea

=== Movies ===
- Khiladi 420
- Yun Hota Toh Kya Hota (2006)
- Maharathi (2008)
- Straight! (2009)

=== Teleserials ===
- Time Bomb 9/11 (24 episodes)

=== Published books ===
- Whats up — short play collection
- Tourist and other stories — collection of short stories
