= Harivallabh Bhayani =

Indian linguist (1917–2000)

- હરિવલ્લભ ચુનીલાલ ભાયાણી
- Born: Harivallabh Chunilal Bhayani; 26 May 1917; Mahuva, Bhavnagar, Gujarat
- Died: 11 November 2000 (aged 83); Mumbai, India
- Education: Master of Arts; Ph.D
- Alma mater: Bharatiya Vidya Bhavan
- Occupations: Literary critic; linguist; translator
- Spouse: Chandrakala (m. 1950)
- Children: Utpal Bhayani
- Writing career
- Language: Gujarati
- Notable work: Rachana Samrachana (1980)
- Notable awards: Ranjitram Suvarna Chandrak (1963); Sahitya Akademi Award (1981); Narmad Suvarna Chandrak (1985); Premanand Suvarna Chandrak (1987); Sahitya Gaurav Puraskar (1989)

Academic work
- Doctoral students: Jayant Gadit; Urmi Desai

Harivallabh Chunilal Bhayani (26 May 1917 – 11 November 2000) was a linguist, researcher, critic and translator from India.

== Biography ==
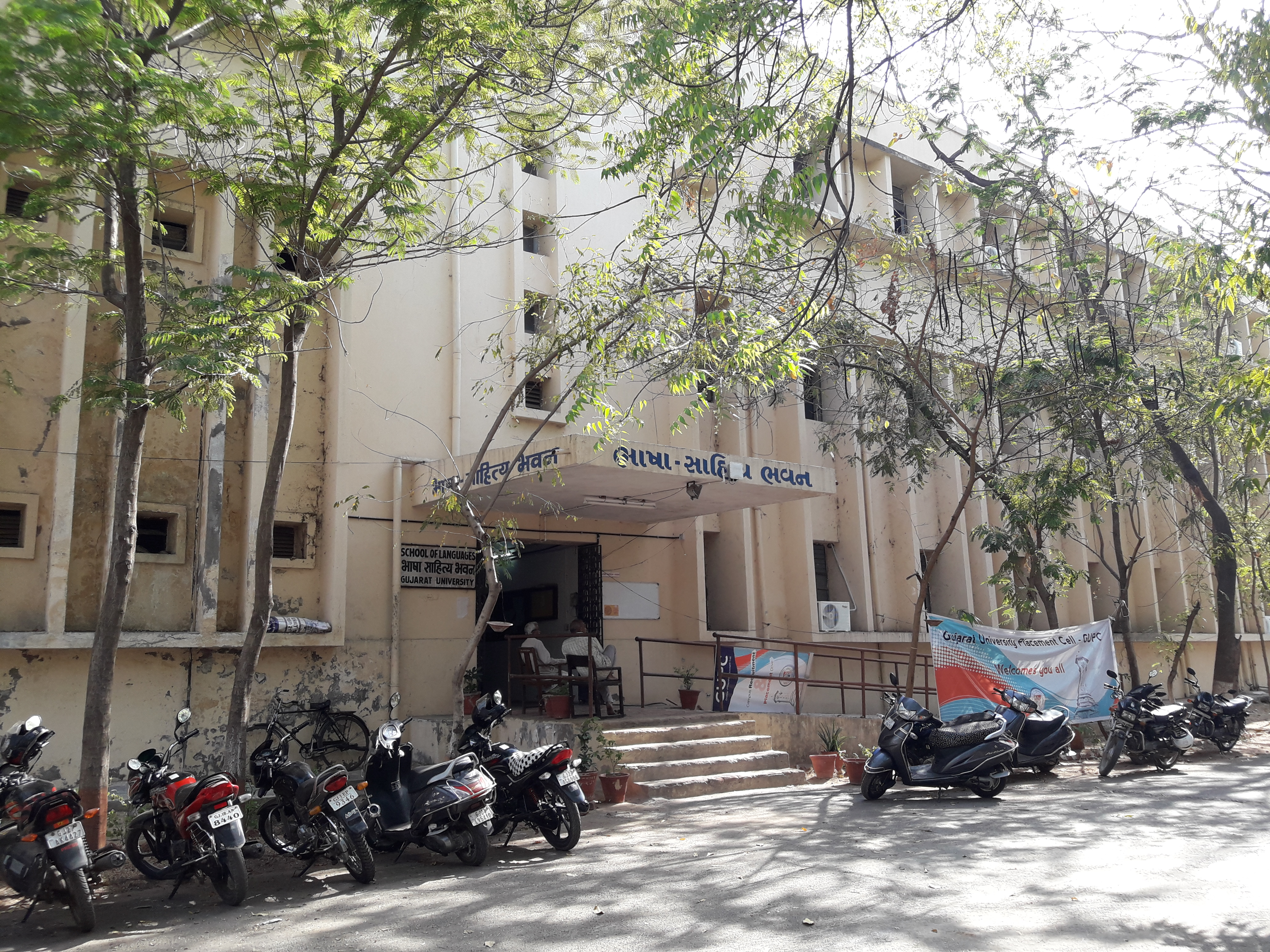
The School of Languages where Bhayani served as professor

Bhayani was born on 26 May 1917 in Mahuva to Dasa Shrimali Jain Sthanakvasi family of Chunilal. His parents died when he was young and was raised by his grandmother. He passed his matriculation in 1934 from M. N. High School in Mahuva. He went to Samaldas College, Bhavnagar and completed B.A. in Sanskrit in 1939. He completed M.A. in Sanskrit and Ardhamagadhi from Bharatiya Vidya Bhavan, Bombay in 1941. He married Chandrakala in 1950. He completed his thesis on Paumachariya, an epic poetry in Apabhramsha by Swayambhudev, and received Ph.D. under guidance of Muni Jinvijay in 1951. He was also influenced by Ralph Lilley Turner during this period. He was a professor at Bharatiya Vidya Bhavan from 1945 to 1965. He returned to Ahmedabad and joined School of Languages, Gujarat University. He taught there from 1965 to 1975. He voluntarily retired in 1975. He served as an honorary professor at Lalbhai Dalpatbhai Institute of Indology. He also served at International School of Dravidian Linguistics in 1980. He received honorary fellowship of the School of Oriental and African Studies of the University of London in 1993. In 1993, he co-founded Anusandhan, a journal featuring Jain literary works. He died on 11 November 2000 in Mumbai, India.

== Works ==
Bhayani was a scholar of Sanskrit, Prakrit, Apabhramsha, Old Gujarati and other medieval Indian languages. He applied Neogrammarian in the study of the Gujarati language.

His written works include:

- Vyutpattivicāra (1975)
- Śabdakathā (1963)
- Apabhramśa language and literature (1989)
- Indological studies (1993)
- Kāvyanuṃ samvedana (1976)
- Racanā ane samracanā (1980)
- Gujarātī bhāshānā itihāsanī keṭalīka samasyāo (1976)
- Setubandha (2002)
- Prācīna-madhyakālīna Kr̥shṇa-kāvya ane Narasiṃha-svādhyāya (1986)
- Videharāja ane camatkārī (1982)
- Lokakathānāṃ mūla ane kula (1990)
- Śabdaprayogonī pagadandi par (1995)
- Gujarātī bhāshāno laghu vyutpattikośa (1994)
- Śodha ane svādhyāya (1965)
- Gujarātī bhāshānuṃ aitihāsika vyākarana, Ī. sa 1150thi 1550 sudhī (1988)
- Śabda-parisīlana (1973)
- Lokasāhitya, sampādana ane saṃśodhana (1991)
- Bhāratīya sanskāraparamparā ane āpano vartamāna (1994)
- Rāüla vela of Roḍa (1996)
- Anuśīlano (1965)
- Bhāvana, vibhāvana (1991)
- Kāvyavyāpāra (1982)
- Śodhakhoḷanī pagadandḍī para (1997)
- Kāvyakautuka (1987)
- Kāvyaprapañca (1989)
- Studies in Hemacandra's Deśināmamālā (1966)
- Studies in Deśya Prakrit (1988)
- Kamalanā tantu (1994)
- Some topics in the development of OIA, MIA, NIA (1997)
- Thodoka vyākaraṇa vicāra (1969)
- Anusandhāna (1972)
- Śodha aura svādhyāya (1996)
- Muktak-marmara (1998)
- Te hi no divasāh (1998) (autobiography)

== Awards ==
Bhayani received Ranjitram Suvarna Chandrak in 1963, Premanand Suvarna Chandrak in 1987, Sahitya Gaurav Puraskar in 1989. He was also awarded Sahitya Akademi Award for Gujarati writers in 1981 for his critical work Rachna Samrachna and Narmad Suvarna Chandrak in 1985 for his book Kavyaprakash. He was awarded the P. V. Kane Gold Medal by The Asiatic Society of Mumbai for the year 1992.

== See also ==
- List of Gujarati-language writers
