= Raeesh Maniar =

Gujarati poet and script writer

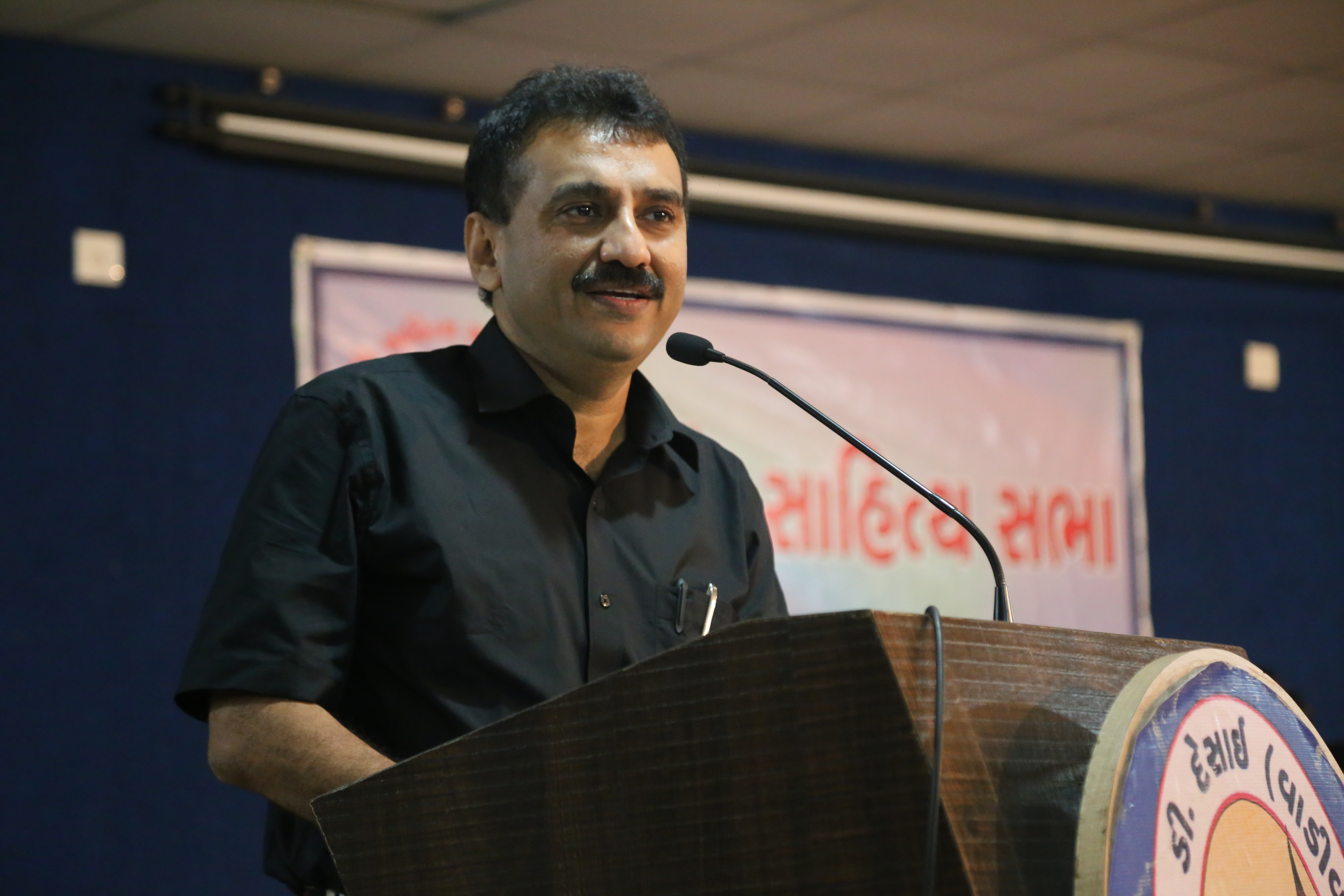
- Maniar in 2017
- Born: August 19, 1966 (age 60); Killa Pardi, Valsad
- Education: MD (Pediatrics)
- Alma mater: Surat Medical College
- Occupations: poet, translator, playwright, columnist, lyricist, script writer
- Spouse: Ami Patel (1989-present)
- Writing career
- Language: Gujarati
- Years active: 1981–present
- Genres: ghazal, play
- Notable works: Shabda Mara Swabhavma J Nathi (1998); Ghazal Nu Chhandovidhan (2008)
- Notable awards: Shayda Award (2001); Narmad Suvarna Chandrak (2012); Kalapi Award (2016)
- Raeesh Maniar's voice Mareez's poem recitation

Raeesh Maniar is a Gujarati language poet, translator, playwright, columnist, compere, lyricist and script writer from Gujarat, India. His significant works include Kafiyanagar (1989), Shabda Mara Swabhavma J Nathi (1998) and Aam Lakhvu Karave Alakh Ni Safar (2011). He has written two reference books for students of ghazals, Ghazal: Roop ane Rang (2006) and Ghazal Nu Chhandovidhan (2008). The later work contains original research that may be applicable to prosody of all north Indian languages. He has written lyrics for several Gujarati and Hindi language movies. The Indian National Theater of Mumbai awarded him the Shayda Award for 2001 and the Kalapi Award for 2016 for his contributions to Gujarati ghazal poetry.

== Early life ==
Maniar was born on 19 August 1966 in Killa Pardi, Valsad district, Gujarat. He took his secondary schooling from D.C.O. Killa in 1980 and completed higher secondary schooling at St. Xavier's School, Surat, in 1983. He completed his MD (Pediatrics) in 1991 at Surat Medical College.

He married Ami Patel in 1989. He currently lives in Surat.

== Career ==
Raeesh Maniar started to write poems in 1977 as an 11-year-old child. In December 1981, he had a poem published for the first time in a daily newspaper, Gujarat Samachar. He started his career as a medical doctor in 1993 at Surat. From 2008, he restricted his practice to developmental and behavioural child psychology.

In 2013, he abandoned his clinical practice as a doctor and started to work full-time as a freelance writer, playwright, compere, lyricist and script writer.

He has written songs for Gujarati films, including Kevi Rite Jaish (2012), Aa To Prem Chhe, Vishwasghat, Polampol, Musafir, Vitamin She and Je Pan Kahish Te Sachu Kahish. In 2013, he penned the background song "Thai Dod Dod Gali Vaat Mod" for Sanjay Leela Bhansali's Goliyon Ki Raasleela Ram-Leela. He also wrote the script for the popular Gujarati plays Antim Aparadh, Ek Anokho Karar and Love You Jindagi. All three plays were among the winners in the Chitralekha competition. The Sandesh newspaper published his column, "Aras-paras Ni Academy", every Sunday. Formerly, he wrote the column "Vaat Nu Vatesar", in the same newspaper from 2010 to 2014. He has also written a column called "Paraspar" for NavGujarat Samay since 2014.Now his humor column "Masti Amasti" is published in "Divya Bhaskar" newspaper since 2018.

== Works ==
Raeesh Maniar is known for his ghazals and hazals (humorous ghazals) in Gujarati. Kafiyanagar, his first book, was published in 1989, followed by Shabda Mara Swabhavma J Nathi (1998) and Aam Lakhvu Karaave Alakh Ni Safar (2011). He has translated major works by Kaifi Azmi, Gulzar, Sahir Ludhianvi and Javed Akhtar and published each of them as books. His other significant works include Mareez: Astitva Ane Vyaktitva (2001; a biography and criticism of the works of Mareez), "Mahol Mushayra No" an appreciation of selected Urdu poems. Ghazal: Roop Ane Rang (2006; criticism of the form and construction of ghazals) and Ghazal Nu Chhandovidhan (2008; research articles on meters of ghazal). His work in the field of child psychology and parenting includes Baal Uchher Ni Barakhadi, Aapne Balkone Sha Mate Bhanaviye Chhiye and Tame ane Tamaru Nirogi Balak. He also has written a novel called "Love You Lavanya" published in 2018.

His translation of Ghalib's Urdu couplets into Gujarati is widely acclaimed. These translations are published as a book "Ghalibanama"(2019) and is unique in the sense that they maintain the prosody format of Urdu in Gujarati. It has drawn attention of Gulzarji. His short story collection "Doobkikhor" was published on Matrubharti in 2021. Screenwriter Abhijat Joshi has written it's preface. Indian poetry anthology "A poem a day" compiled by Gulzarji features his poems translated by Gulzarji.

== Recognition ==
He won the Shayda Award (2001) instituted by the Indian National Theater in Mumbai.

In 2002, he won an award given by Gujarati Sahitya Parishad for the best translation of Gulzar's poetry into Gujarati. His book, Baal Uchher Ni Barakhadi, was awarded a second-place B. N. Mankad Prize for 1998–1999 by Gujarati Sahitya Parishad.

He received the Kalapi Award in 2016. He received the Narmad Suvarna Chandrak for 2012 for his book Aam Lakhvu Karave Alakhni Safar.

== See also ==
- List of Gujarati-language writers
