= Pratik Gandhi =

Indian actor (born 1980)

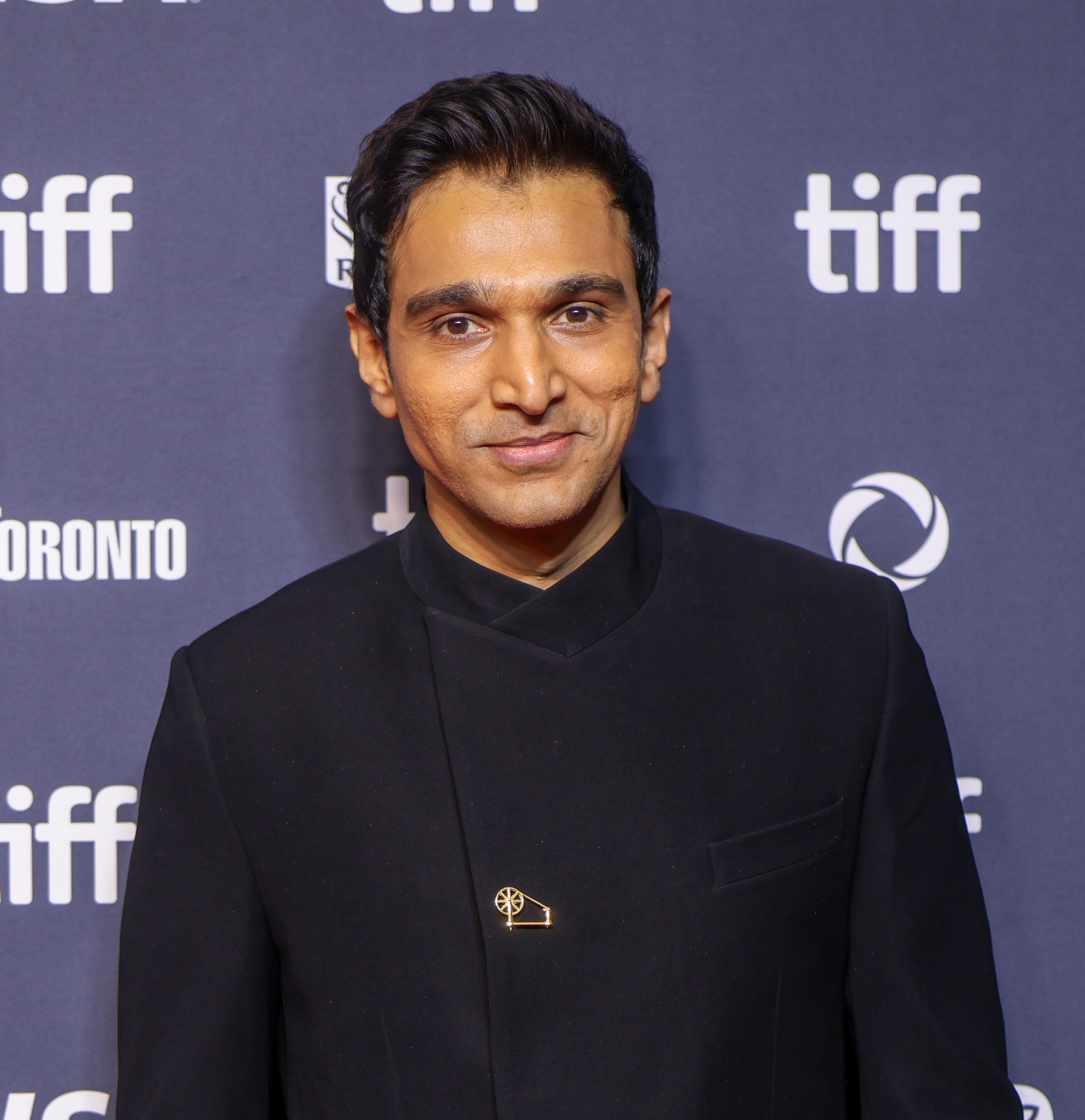
- Pratik Gandhi at TIFF 2025 for Gandhi.
- Born: 28 April 1980 (age 46); Surat, Gujarat, India
- Education: North Maharashtra University
- Occupation: Actor
- Years active: 2005–present
- Spouse: Bhamini Oza Gandhi (m. 2008)
- Children: 1

Pratik Gandhi (born 28 April 1980) is an Indian actor known for his work in Gujarati and Hindi films, theater, and television. He gained widespread recognition for portraying Harshad Mehta in the Sony LIV series Scam 1992 (2020). Gandhi has also starred as Raju in the National award-winning Gujarati film Wrong Side Raju and as Vithal Teedi in the web series Vitthal Teedi. In 2024, he appeared in the Hindi films Madgaon Express (2024) and Do Aur Do Pyaar (2024).

== Early life ==
Gandhi was born in Surat to parents who were teachers. He completed his schooling at V. D. Desai (Wadiwala) in Surat. He studied at Surat where he was involved in theatre arts. He graduated in Industrial Engineering from the North Maharashtra University, Jalgaon in 2004. From 2004 to 2007, he worked with National Productivity Council in Satara and Pune. He later worked at Reliance Infrastructure (cement division) in Mumbai from January 2008 to 2016.

== Career ==
Gandhi participated in the Gujarati play Aa Paar Ke Pele Paar. He played a role in the Gujarati film Bey Yaar (2014) directed by Abhishek Jain and in plays Mere Piya Gaye Rangoon, Hu Chandrakant Bakshi and Ame Badha Sathe To Duniya Laiye Mathe. In Mohan's Masala, he performed a monologue in three languages, English, Hindi and Gujarati on the same day. He played a lead role in his next film, Wrong Side Raju (2016) which won the National Award for Best Gujarati Film. His next Gujarati films Love Ni Bhavai (2017) and Ventilator (2018) were commercially successful.

He played stockbroker Harshad Mehta in the 2020 Sony LIV biographical drama web series Scam 1992 directed by Hansal Mehta. He received wide acclaim for portraying Harshad Mehta.

Gandhi appeared in the 2021 Hindi film Bhavai where he played a lead. The film received mixed reviews. His next Hindi film was Atithi Bhooto Bhava was released in 2022. Gujarati film Vaahlam Jaao Ne (2022) was his next release.

He appears in Hindi film Dedh Bigha Zameen, written and directed by Pulkit. In July 2022, director Hansal Mehta announced a multi-season biographical web series Gandhi on Mahatma Gandhi starring Pratik Gandhi in lead role.

In 2025, Gandhi appeared in the television series Saare Jahan Se Accha: The Silent Guardians, which explores the stories of unsung protectors of India.

== Personal life ==
He is married to actress Bhamini Oza and the couple has a daughter Miraya (born 2014).

== Filmography ==
=== Theater ===
Year	Play	Role(s)	Language(s)
2005	Aa Paar Ke Pele Paar	Ravikant Deewan	Gujarati
2007	Jujave Roop	Dapher	Gujarati
2007	Apurva Avsar	6 characters	Gujarati, Hindi
2008	Amarfal		Gujarati
2008	Saat Tari Akvees part 1	Rudra	Gujarati
2009	Saat Tari Akvees part 1	Mukesh Chovatia	Gujarati
2010	Chho Chok Chovees		Gujarati
2012	Bohot Nachyo Gopal	Krishna	Gujarati
2013	Ame Badha Sathe To Duniya Laiye Mathe	7 characters - Popat, Akhil, Vimal, Kaka, Naresh, etc.	Gujarati
2013	Hu Chandrakant Bakshi	Chandrakant Bakshi	Gujarati
2014	Master Madam	Master	Gujarati
2015	Mohan No Masalo	Mohandas Gandhi	Gujarati, Hindi, English
2015	Mere Piya Gaye Rangoon	Bharat Ram	Hindi
2016	Sikka Ni Triji Baaju	Dhiru Sixer	Gujarati
2018	Sir Sir Sarla	Sir	Gujarati

=== Films ===
Key
†	Denotes films that have not yet been released

Year	Title	Role	Language	Notes	Ref(s)
2006	Yours Emotionally	Mani	English		
2007	68 Pages	Umrao's brother	Hindi		
2014	Bey Yaar	Tapan "Tino"	Gujarati		
2016	Wrong Side Raju	Raju Bambani	Gujarati		
2017	Tamburo	Bhavik	Gujarati		
2017	Love Ni Bhavai	Aditya Shah	Gujarati		
2018	Loveyatri	Nagendra "Negative" Pathak	Hindi		
2018	Mitron	Raunak	Hindi		
2018	Ventilator	Prashant Mandalia	Gujarati		
2019	Dhunki	Nikunj	Gujarati		
2019	Gujarat 11	Nirmal	Gujarati		
2020	Luv Ni Love Storys	Luv Modi	Gujarati		
2020	Dhira	Tenali Rama	Gujarati	Dubbed version	
2021	Bhavai	Rajaram Joshi	Hindi		
2021	Shimmy	Amol Parekh	Hindi		
2022	Kehvatlal Parivar		Gujarati	Special appearance in the song "Holi Aavi Aavi"	
2022	Sarathi		Gujarati		
2022	Atithi Bhooto Bhava	Srikant Shirodkar	Hindi		
2022	Kahani Rubberband Ki	Narendra Tripathi aka Nanno	Hindi		
2022	Vaahlam Jaao Ne		Gujarati		
2023	Khichdi 2: Mission Paanthukistan	Pilot	Hindi	Special Appearance	
2024	Madgaon Express	Pratik "Pinku" Goradia	Hindi		
2024	Do Aur Do Pyaar	Anirrudh “Ani” Banerjee	Hindi		
2024	Dedh Bigha Zameen	Anil Singh	Hindi		
2024	Spam	Nikhil	Hindi	Short film	
2024	Agni	Vitthalrao Dhonduba Surve	Hindi		
2025	Dhoom Dhaam	Veer Poddar	Hindi		
2025	Phule	Jyotirao Phule	Hindi		
2026	Toaster	Customer at the shop	Hindi		
2026	Ghamasaan	Aditya (IPS)	Hindi		
TBA	Woh Ladki Hai Kahaan? †	Gagan Agarwal	Hindi		
TBA	Hum Hindustani †	TBA			

=== Television ===
Year	Title	Role	Language	Notes	Ref(s)
2016	Crime Patrol	Arjun Dixit	Hindi	Episode 614: "Policeman"	
2020	Scam 1992	Harshad Mehta	Hindi		
2021	Vitthal Teedi	Vitthal Tripathi	Gujarati	Season 1	
2021	Star vs Food	Himself	English, Hindi	Season 1; Episode 5	
2022	The Great Indian Murder	Suraj Yadav	Hindi		
2022	Modern Love Mumbai	Manzar "Manzu" Ali	Hindi	Episode: "Baai"	
2023	Scoop	Man on Road	Hindi	Uncredited cameo; Episode 6	
2025	Saare Jahan Se Accha	Vishnu Shankar	Hindi	Netflix	
TBA	Gandhi †	Mahatma Gandhi	Hindi		

=== Podcast ===
Year	Title	Role	Platform	Language	Notes	Ref(s)
2021-2022	Gangistan	Aashu Patel	Spotify	Hindi	48 episodes	
