= Gulabdas Broker =

Indian writer (1909–2006)

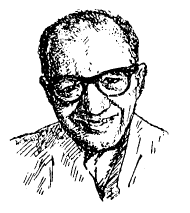
- Born: Gulabdas Harjivandas Broker; 20 September 1909; Porbandar, Bombay Presidency, British India
- Died: 10 June 2006 (aged 96); Pune, Maharashtra, India
- Occupations: Writer, journalist
- Writing career
- Language: Gujarati
- Notable awards: Padma Shri (1991), Ranjitram Suvarna Chandrak (1998)

Gulabdas Harjivandas Broker (20 September 1909 – 10 June 2006) was a Gujarati language writer, literary critic, and editor from India. He is primarily known for his short stories and one-act plays in Gujarati literature. He is considered a pioneer in introducing psychoanalytic themes to Gujarati storytelling.

== Life and career ==
Gulabdas Harjivandas was born at Porbandar on 20 September 1909. He completed his education in Gujarati and English literature from Bombay University in 1930. He briefly worked at the Bombay Stock Exchange. Later, he started his writing in 1932 when he was jailed during the Satyagraha movement. He was imprisoned at the Yerwada Central Jail in Pune during the civil disobedience movement of the early 1930s. It was during this incarceration that he wrote his first short story at the behest of a Parsi jailor. He was sentenced to 16 months in imprisonment during the agitation. From 1933 until his retirement in 1964, he worked as a broker in the futures market.

His first short story collection was Ane Biji Vato ("And Other Talks"). He traveled as an Indian representative to the United Nations. He also visited the United States in 1962 and West Germany in 1963. He also traveled with President Sarvepalli Radhakrishnan and received special invitations to visit France and England. He served as a member of the Advisory Board for Gujarati at the Sahitya Akademi.

Broker served as the president of Gujarati Sahitya Parishad from 1973 to 1974. Later in life, he settled in Pune with his family. He died on 10 June 2006 at Pune, Maharashtra.

== Themes and style ==
Broker occupies a significant place in Gujarati literature, particularly for his use of psychoanalysis in fiction. His stories, often written in simple language, explore the complexities of the human mind and everyday events. He frequently addressed the social and sexual issues faced by the upper-middle-class youth in urban environments. He also wrote stories centered on the relationships between mothers and children.

Broker believed that the short story format allowed for the development of a single aspect of life. He was known for creating female characters that were strong and ahead of their times, though he was occasionally criticized for being "obsessed" with female characters. Regarding his literary standing compared to Russian or French masters, he maintained, "I have my own style."

== Works ==
He edited Akhandand, a Gujarati monthly. His first short story, Lata Sun Bole, was published in many magazines and invited readers to suggest endings. Many of his early stories were published in Prasthan, a prestigious Gujarati literary magazine based in Mumbai.

He wrote a large number of short stories, plays, travelogues, and an autobiography. Several of them are translated into Hindi, Spanish, German, and English. Additionally, his works have been translated into Italian and other European languages. He also edited Ekanki, a periodical devoted to one-act plays.

Some of his notable works include:

- Lata Ane Biji Vato (1938)
- Vasundhara Ane Biji Vato (1941)
- Ubhi Wate (1944)
- Surya (1950)
- Mansa na Man
- Punya Parvardum Nabhi (1954)
- Prakashan Smit (1956)
- Jwalant Agni (1956)
- Jeevanam Amrit (1974)
- Neeli Nu Bhooth
- Prem Padarath
- Gulamdin Ghadiwalla
- Vasante (1964) – Poetry collection
- Rup Srishtiman (1962) – Critical reviews
- Nava Gaganni (1970) – Travelogue

Broker also translated literature into Gujarati, including Henrik Ibsen's Ghosts (1960) and Henry James's The American (1967).

== Awards ==
Broker was awarded the Padma Shri, the fourth highest civilian award in India in 1992. He was also awarded Ranjitram Suvarna Chandrak, the highest literary award in Gujarati language, in 1998. He also received Kumar Chandrak in 1968.

He received the Mahida Gold Medal in 1943 for his story Dhumraser. The Government of Bombay awarded him the first prize for the play Dhumraser (1947). His collection Mansana Man received the first prize from the Government of Gujarat in 1968, an honor also bestowed upon his works Surya and Nava Gaganni Neeche. He was honored as a Gujarati writer at the Marathi Sahitya Sammelan in 1974.

The Government of Gujarat also awarded him the Narsinh Mehta Award.

== See also ==
- List of Gujarati-language writers
