= Deepa Gahlot =

Indian journalist, author

Deepa Gahlot is a theater and film critic, book author, and scriptwriter. She has written several books on cinema, translated several plays (by Manav Kaul and Paresh Mokashi) into English and adapted Paulo Coelho's novel The Alchemist for the stage. Additionally, she has written-directed a few documentary films and radio shows, and has edited the journals of NFDC and WICA. In 2002, she served on the Mumbai International Film Festival (MIFF) jury. She is the head of programming (theatre and film) at the National Center for the Performing Arts (NCPA).

== Books ==
=== Co-authored ===
- Bollywood Popular Indian Cinema
- Behind the Scenes of Hindi Cinema: A Visual Journey Through the Heart of Bollywood
- Janani
- Bollywood’s Top 20: Superstars of Indian Cinema
- The Prithviwallahs (co-authored with Shashi Kapoor)

=== Author ===
- Take-2: 50 Films that Deserve a New Audience
- King Khan
- Shammi Kapoor (The Legends of Indian Cinema)
- Sheroes: 25 Daring Women of Bollywood Paperback

== Award ==
- National Film Award for Best Film Critic (1998)

== See also ==
- Film Critics Circle of India
