= Utpal Bhayani =

Gujarati writer from India (1953–2019)

- ઉત્પલ હરિવલ્લભ ભાયાણી
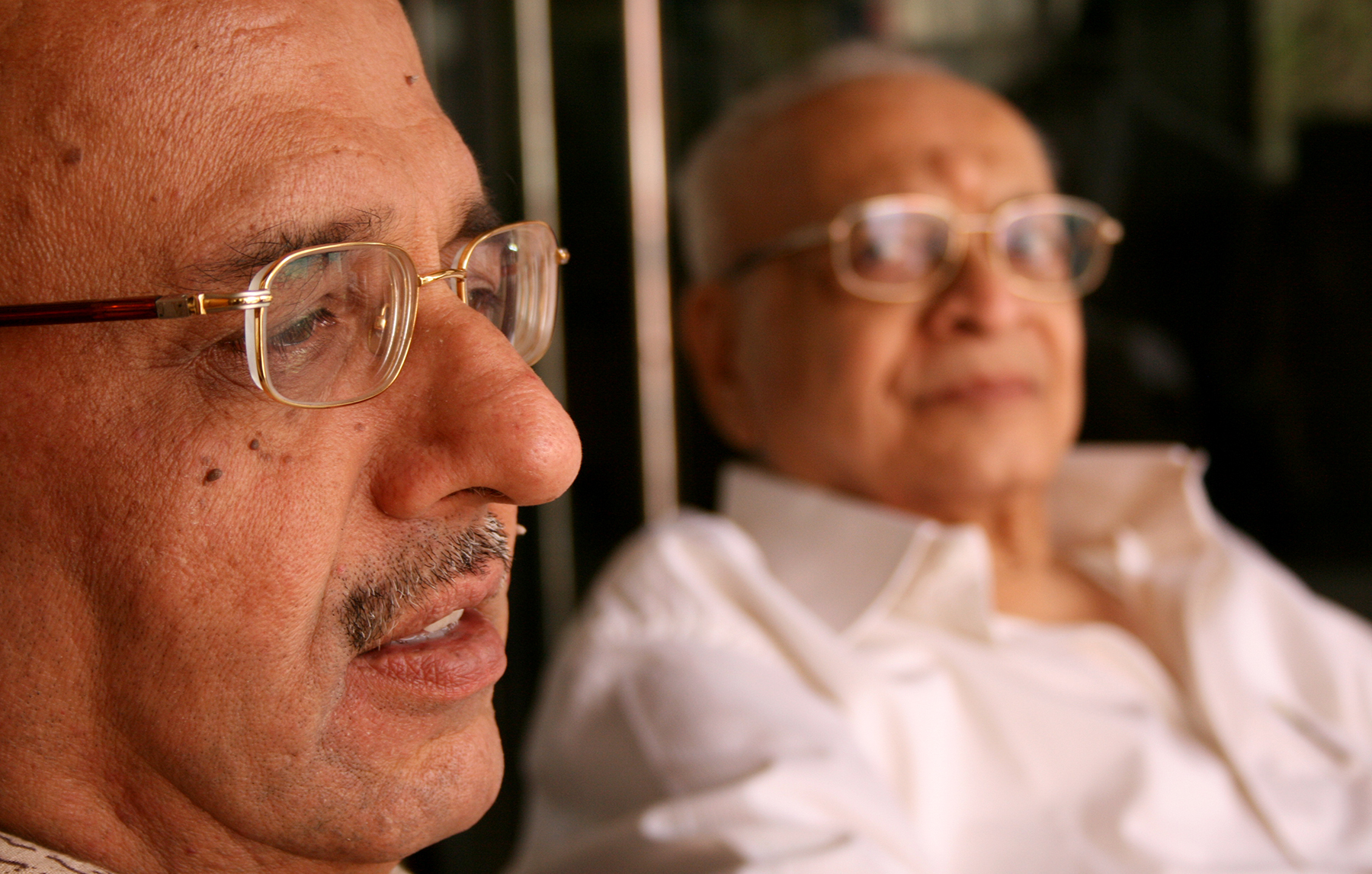
- Bhayani in April 2012
- Born: Utpal Harivallanh Bhayani; 10 October 1953; Calicut, Kerala, India
- Died: 16 October 2019 (aged 66)
- Occupations: Short story writer, playwright, literary critic and translator
- Relatives: Harivallabh Bhayani (father)
- Writing career
- Language: Gujarati
- Notable works: Khatavani (1995); Samajik Natak: Ek Nutan Unmesh (1993)

Utpal Harivallabh Bhayani (10 October 1953 – 16 October 2019) was a Gujarati language story writer, playwright, critic and translator from Gujarat, India.

== Life ==
Utapal Bhayani was born on 10 October 1953 in Calicut (now Kozhikode) to Harivallabh Bhayani, a Gujarati writer. His family was from Mahuva in Bhavnagar district. He studied Master of Commerce and later qualified as Chartered Accountant which he accepted as his profession. He served as a trustee of Parichay Trust, Mumbai.

He died on 16 October 2019.

== Works ==
Nimajjan (1978) was his first collection of stories followed by Hallo! (1983) which included some experimental stories. Khatavani (1995) was well received by critics. Vahi (2008) was his fourth collection. His story Mijbani was included in Swatantrottar Gujarati Navlika edited by Raghuveer Chaudhari. His Extra Ticket was anthologized in Ketlik Gujarati Tunki Vartao (1955–80) edited by Gulabdas Broker and Suman Shah.

He was a prolific drama critic but he considered his works as Samiksha not criticism. His drama criticism works starting in 1976 include Drashyafalak (1981), Preksha (1986), Natakno Jeev (1987), Tarjni Sanket (1992), Samajik Natak: Ek Nutan Unmesh (1993), Deshvideshni Rangbhumi (2001), Rangbhumi (2004), Natyadrashti (2003), Natyagoshthi (2004). Mahabharat (1991) and Sahyog (1999) are translations. He edited Sampark (1982), Adhunik Gujarati Ekankio (1994) and Sureshni Sathe Sathe (2007).

== Awards ==
His story collection Khatvani (1995) was awarded by Gujarati Sahitya Parishad.

== See also ==
- List of Gujarati-language writers
