= Natmandal =

Indian amateur theatre troupe

- Formation: 1949
- Type: Theatre group
- Purpose: Gujarati theatre
- Location: Ahmedabad, India

Natya Vidya Mandir, a theatre school, and its amateur theatre troupe Natmandal from Ahmedabad, Gujarat, India had heavily influenced new Gujarati theatre. Established in 1949, it trained many theatre people and produced classic, modern and experimental plays in its twenty years of existence.

== History ==
In 1948, at the centenary celebration of Gujarat Vidhya Sabha, a literary institute, politician Ganesh Vasudev Mavalankar and writer Rasiklal Parikh proposed a school for theatre training in Gujarat. Gujarati theatre actor-director Jaishankar Sundari was appointed to lead the school. Natya Vidya Mandir was established in 1949 and was the first such theatre school of India. The school formed an amateur theatre troupe Natmandal in 1951–52. It operated from the old Premabhai Hall in Bhadra area of Ahmedabad where performances as well as training were held.

Natmandal heavily influenced the new Gujarati theatre with its experiments and academic activities. It trained and encouraged many actors, directors, playwrights and set designers as well as audiences. Their students include Jashwant Thaker, Deena Gandhi, Pransukh Nayak, Kailash Pandya, Dhananjay Thaker, Prabha Pathak and Arvind Pathak.

Natmandal remained active for twenty years.

== Selected productions ==
The school-cum-troupe produced many classic, modern as well as experimental plays over the years including:

- Sanskrit classics:
  - Bhasa's Urubhanga
  - Bodhayana's Bhagavadajjukiya
- Gujarati plays:
  - Ramanbhai Neelkanth's Raino Parvat
  - Rasiklal Parikh's Mena Gurjari
  - Dalpatram's Mithyabhiman
- Bengali plays:
  - Sarat Chandra Chattopadhyay's Vijaya and Birajbahu
  - Rabindranath Tagore's Chitrangada and Muktadhara
- Henrik Ibsen's A Doll's House and An Enemy of the People
