= Mithyabhiman =

1871 Gujarati language play by Dalpatram

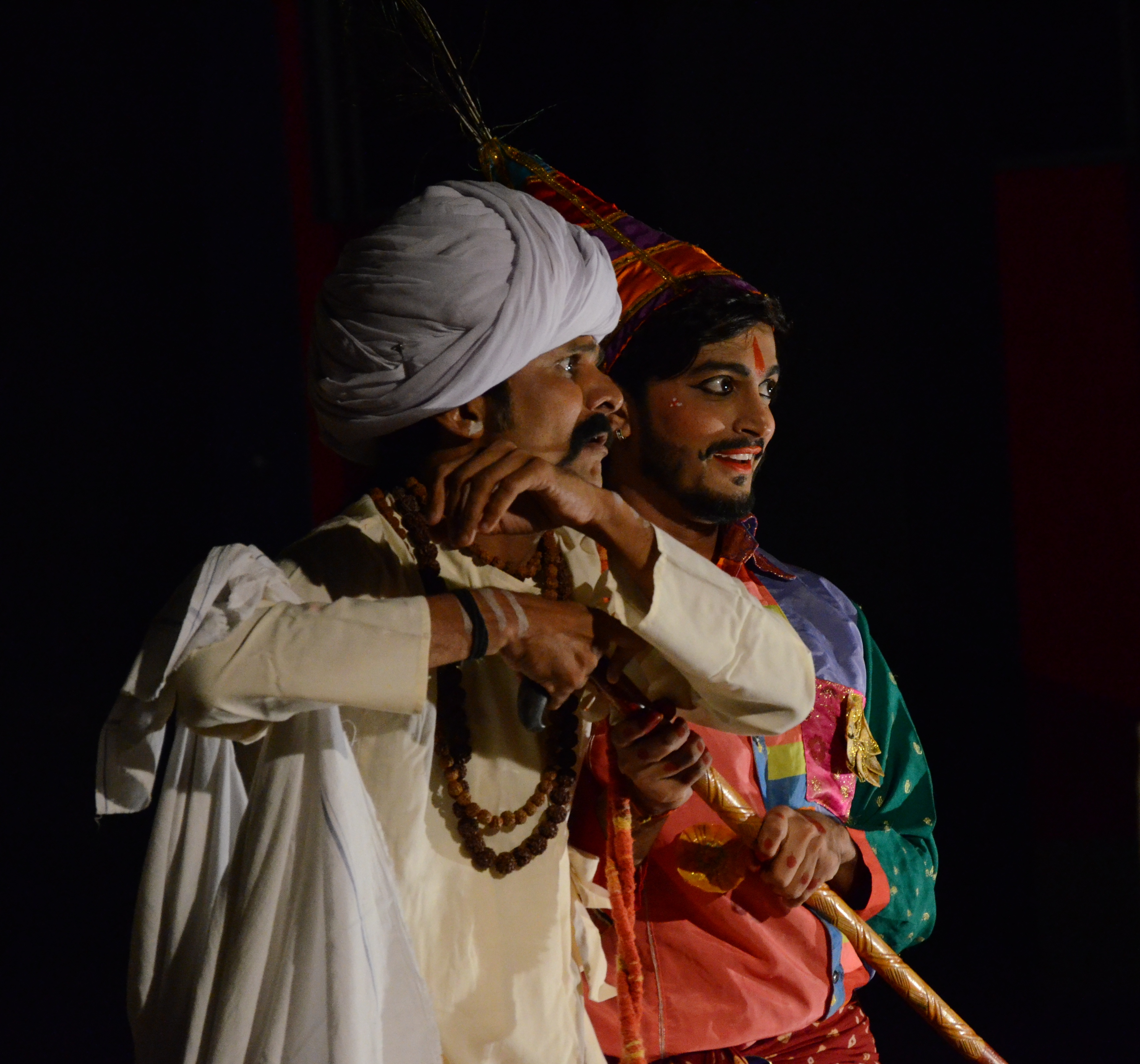
- Performance of Mithyabhiman (directed by Mahendrasinh Parmar) at Saurashtra Literature Festival, Rajkot in June 2018. The photo depicts Jivram Bhatt and Ranglo.
- Written by: Dalpatram
- Characters: Jivram Bhatt; Raghunath; Sutradhar; Ranglo (jester)
- Original language: Gujarati
- Genre: Comic play

Premiere
- Date premiered: 1955
- Place premiered: Natmandal, Ahmedabad

Mithyabhiman (pronounced [mit̪ʰyabʰiman̪]; English: False Pride) is an 1871 Gujarati play by Indian writer Dalpatram. Considered to be a milestone in Gujarati literature, it holds an important place among the comic plays in the history of Gujarati drama. The play tells a story of Jivaram Bhatt, who suffers from nyctalopia (night blindness) but does not want people to know about it. When he visits his father-in-law's house, he causes considerable difficulty and confusion while trying in vain to hide his disability.

== Background ==
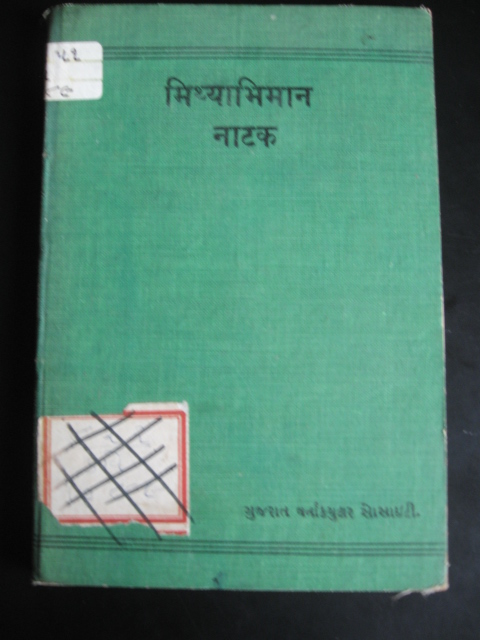
Mithyabhiman book cover

Dalpatram wrote Mithyabhiman in 1870, with subtitle Bhungal Vinani Bhavai. The play fuses the elements of a comic folk-play form known as Bhavai, traditional Sanskrit drama and western drama. It has eight acts and 14 scenes. It was first published in 1871 by the Gujarat Vernacular Society (then Gujarat Vidhya Sabha) under the title Mithyabhiman athva Jivram Bhatt.

== Characters ==
The play's main characters are:

- Jivram Bhatt, a nyctalopia sufferer
- Raghunath, Jivram's father-in-law
- Sutradhar
- Ranglo (jester)

== Plot ==
The play is introduced by a dialogue between Sūtradhār (who introduces the plot to the audience) and the jester Ranglo. Jivram Bhatt, the protagonist, enters walking through a forest on his way to his father-in-law's house in Manaspuri. However, because he suffers from nyctalopia (night blindness), he cannot decide which way to go. He conceals his disability by pretending to see everything, and rejects the helping hand offered by two shepherds related to his father-in-law's family. Ultimately, he tries to reach his destination by holding the tail of his father-in-law's baby buffalo, who drags him into a ditch beside the road.

The second Act opens in the house of Jivram's father-in-law, Raghunath, who, as an orthodox brahmin, believes that the Vedas have mysterious meaning which God alone knows. Ranglo informs him that his son in-law has arrived on the outskirts of Manaspuri. The shepherd Bijal also informs him that Jivram is approaching the village, led by the buffalo's tail.

When they do not find Jivram with the buffalo, Raghunath and his son set out in search of him. They find him lying in a ditch. They ask him to accompany them home, but he, being unable to see at night, refuses to go with them, on the pretext that his mother-in-law called him ‘night-blind' on a previous occasion. After a lot of persuasion, Jivram agrees to accompany them on the condition that nobody in the village call him night-blind. Raghunath asks the local prince to issue an order asking all the residents of the village not to call Jivram night-blind. The prince issues such an order.

The members of Raghunath's family ask Jivram questions about his achievements. Jivram boasts of his greatness in matters of knowledge, creativity and worship, amongst others. As a result of night-blindness, he bungles every step. When he has a bath, instead of clean water, he pours a pot of animals' urine onto his body. While sitting for dinner, he faces the wall; when his mother-in-law serves him lapshi (a sweet dish made of wheat flour), the young buffalo eats it. Then, when the lady comes to serve the dessert again, Jivram gives her severe beating, thinking she is the buffalo. Devbai cries and curses him. On all these occasions, Jivram tries to justify his behavior stupidly and shamelessly, exhibiting vanity and hypocrisy.

Jivram gets up at midnight to use the bathroom; however, to avoid getting lost due to his night-blindness, he ties his turban to the cot and goes to the urinal with the other end of the turban in his hand. However, the baby buffalo chews away the middle portion of the turban. Jivram gets lost and tumbles onto his mother-in-law, who gets up screaming 'thief, thief.' Raghunath and Somnath get up and, taking Jivaram for a thief, start beating him severely. The police arrive and arrest Jivram in the dark. Nobody listens to Jivram's voice in the din. While in police custody, Jivram is beaten to force him to confess the crime. Raghunath and others believe that Jivram has been kidnapped. Raghunath's statement that they won't be able to replace the stolen 'thing' even by paying Rs. 2,000 adds to the confusion.

The so-called thief is then brought to the court in a cot and the truth is revealed. Jivram is on the brink of death; in the final Act, he is brought home and treated by a physician-cum-astrologer. But there is no chance of recovery. At the end Jivram repents his unseemly behavior. He asks his relatives to erect a marble pillar in his memory and inscribe it with 12 stanzas which exhort people to abstain from the vices of pride, vanity and hypocrisy.

== Performance ==
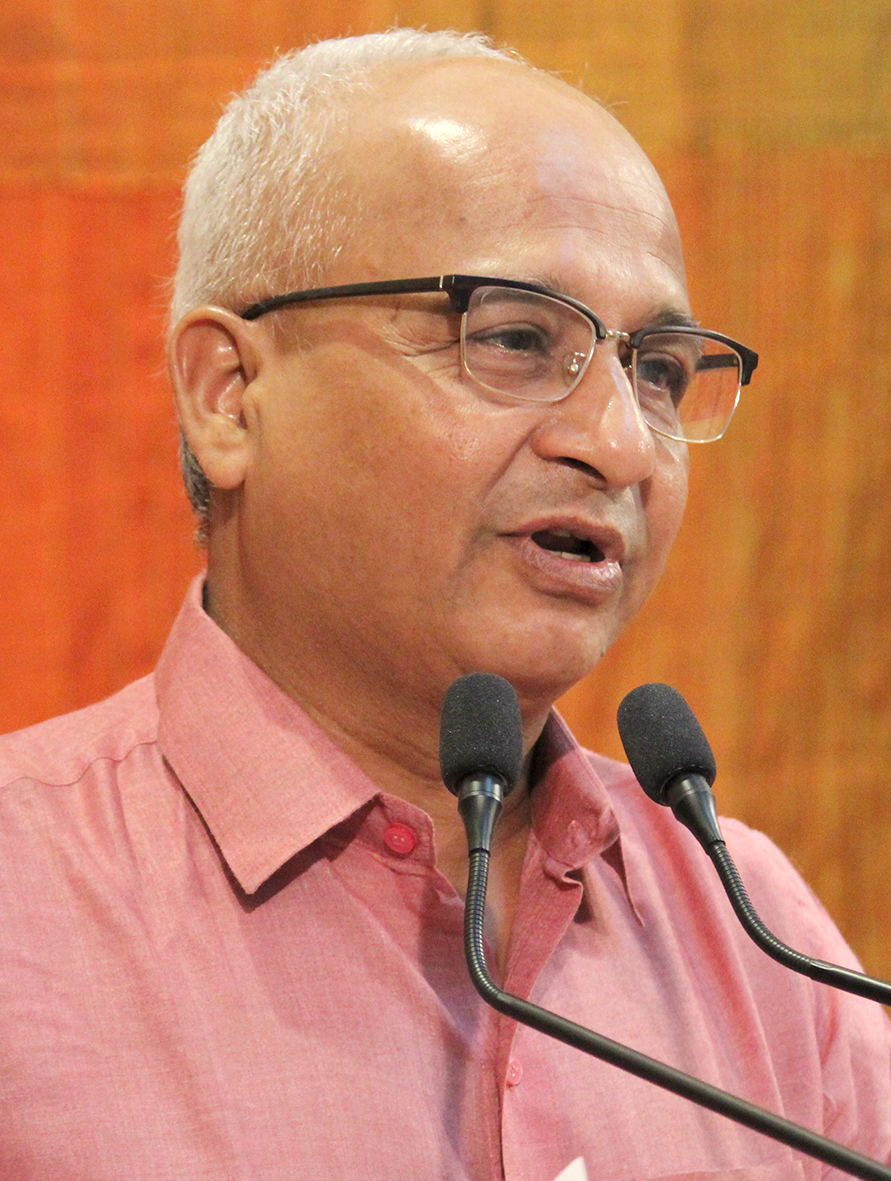
Archan Trivedi who played Jivram Bhatt

Mithyabhiman was probably first performed in 1955 by the Natmandal, a theatre school operated by Gujarat Vidhya Sabha. It was directed by Jaishankar Bhojak, and Pransukh Nayak played the role of Jivram Bhatt. In 1998, Kailash Pandya adapted the play as Bhungal Vinani Bhavai, which was staged at Natarani, Ahmedabad the same year. In the production, Archan Trivedi played the role of Jivram Bhatt. The play was staged at R. V. Pathak Hall of Gujarati Sahitya Parishad, Ahmedabad on 21 January 2007. It was directed by Gujarati writer and dramatist Mahendrasinh Parmar.

== Reception ==
Considered to be a milestone in the development of Gujarati drama, Mithyabhiman is the first humorous play in Gujarati language. It holds an important place in the history of Gujarati comic plays.
