= Pransukh Nayak =

Indian theatre actor, director, manager and playwright (1910–1989)

- Born: 23 April 1910; Jagudan, British India
- Died: 12 March 1989 (aged 78); Ahmedabad, Gujarat, India
- Occupations: Stage actor, director, manager, playwright
- Father: Manilal

Pransukh Manilal Nayak (23 April 1910 – 12 March 1989) was an Indian Gujarati theatre actor, director, manager, and playwright from Gujarat, India. Born into a family of traditional theatre actors, he joined theatre troupes at a young age and rose to fame for his comic roles and female impersonations. His performances as a woman from Banaras in Kumali Kali and as Jivram Bhatt in Mithyabhiman were acclaimed. During his long career, he worked with many theatre companies and gave 22,455 performances, earning a listing in the 1989 Guinness Book of Records.

== Early life ==
Pransukh Nayak was born on 23 April 1910 in a village called Jagudan, which is now in Mehsana district, Gujarat, to a family of traditional Bhavai actors. His father Manilal Mulchand was a popular Bhavai actor and the people of nearby villages flocked to see his performances in veshas (acts) of Ramapir and Chhelbatau. Pransukh had participated in one performance when he was around seven or eight years old. He studied two levels in a Gujarati school.

== Career ==
Nayak was inspired by a performance by female impersonator Jaishankar Sundari to join a Bhavai troupe at the age of nine. He joined Deshi Natak Samaj (Note: Natak Samaj and Natak Mandali can be translated as 'drama society' and 'theatre group' (lit. 'circle').) in Surat, where he played female impersonator roles. He later worked with Aryaniti Natak Samaj—owned by Motiram Nandwana—and Vidyavinod Natak Samaj owned by Pyarelal Viththalrao Mehta. He later joined Mumbai Gujarati Natak Mandali, where he was trained under Surajram Nayak, Jaishankar Sundari and Bapulal Nayak. In Mumbai, he appeared in a supporting female role as Kashi—a woman from Banaras—in Kumali Kali (Delicate Bud, 1926), and later in College Kanya (College Girl, 1925), which brought him fame in the Bombay theatre circuit (now Mumbai) at the age of fifteen. He received his nickname Lucknowri Tetar due to his role in Kumali Kali. He later diversified his performances, mostly in comic roles. He also acted in Jugal Jugari (Jugal the Gambler, 1902), Vijya Kalyani, Pavitra Leelavati, Sattano Mad, Uma Devdi, Ramviyog, Veenaveli, Santanona Vanke, Rukshamani Haran, Sati Damayanti and Vijayavijay. He played several comedic duos with Chhagan Romeo.

When Mumbai Gujarati Natak Mandali became defunct, Nayak joined Palitana Bhaktipradarshak Mandali and Prabhat Kalamandal. When these troupes also became defunct, he went to Ahmedabad and joined Natmandal, which was operated by Gujarat Vidhya Sabha. Here he was guided by Rasiklal Parikh, Jaishankar Sundari and Dina Pathak. He received acclaim for his performance as a Brahmin in Rasiklal Parikh's Mena Gurjari (Mena of Gujarat, 1953) and as a comic role of Jivram Bhatt in Dalpatram's Mithyabhiman (False Vanity, 1955). He also briefly worked with Darpana Academy of Performing Arts. He taught theatre at Shreyas Foundation in Ahmedabad for some time. During the last years of his life, Nayak started a theatre troupe called Pran Theatre, which performed educational plays for schoolchildren.

Nayak acted as a royal astrologer in the Gujarati film Bhavni Bhavai. Apart from acting and direction, Nayak wrote eight plays including Balotiyana Balela, Bandh Chheepna Moti, Birbalni Chhatri and Balbhakta Prahalad. His notes on commercial theatre and its history, documentation on Bhavai acts and notes of his experiences are archived in the Theatre Media Centre. His few images are also archived in the Gujarat Lokkala Foundation.

In Pransukh Nayak: Flashback, Jitendra Thakkar notes that Pransukh Nayak made 1,050 performances with Deshi Natak Samaj, 400 with Vidhyavinod Natak Samaj, 205 with Aryaniti Natak Samaj, 325 in Hindi and 7,978 in Gujarati with Mumbai Gujarati Natak Mandali, 1,248 with Prabhat Kalamandal, 30 with Rangmandal, 531 with Natmandal, 412 with Darpana, 338 with Pran Theatre and 9,938 with other theatre companies—totalling 22,455 performances. The record was recorded in the 1989 Guinness Book of Records.

Pransukh Nayak died from cancer on 12 March 1989 in Ahmedabad.

== Recognition ==
He was awarded Sangeet Natak Akademi Award in 1974. On 13 September 1963, he was felicitated in Ahmedabad by Gujarat State Sangeet Natak Akademi. His 60th year was celebrated under Vadilal Kamdar, Mayor of Ahmedabad. He was felicitated by Vadodara Municipal Corporation as well.

== Acting career ==
He acted in following plays:

Acting career
Title	Role	Date	Writer	Theatre company
Jugal Jugari	Uko Marwadi	26 August 1902	Mulshankar Mulani	Mumbai Gujarati Natak Mandali
Saubhagyano Sinh	Parvati	25 April 1925	Bapulal Nayak	Mumbai Gujarati Natak Mandali
Madandh Mahila Yane Noorjahan	Diwali	1926	Jayashankar Vaghjibhai Vyas	Mumbai Gujarati Natak Mandali
Kumali Kali	Kashi	1926	Shayda	Mumbai Gujarati Natak Mandali
Jamanano Rang	Indu	1927	Gajendra Lalshankar Pandya	Mumbai Gujarati Natak Mandali
Tarunina Tarang	Kishori	1928	Gajendra Lalshankar Pandya	Mumbai Gujarati Natak Mandali
Kashmirnu Prabhat	Lalita	1928	Gajendra Lalshankar Pandya	Mumbai Gujarati Natak Mandali
Kudaratno Nyay	Kusum	21 February 1929	Gajendra Lalshankar Pandya	Mumbai Gujarati Natak Mandali
Up-to-date Mawali	Shahera	29 March 1929	Joseph David	Mumbai Gujarati Natak Mandali
Swamibhakti Yane Baji Deshpande (Hindi)	Tulsi	1929	Munshi Mohiyuddin Nazan	Mumbai Gujarati Natak Mandali
Kuldeepak	Mena	9 January 1930	Gajendra Lalshankar Pandya	Mumbai Gujarati Natak Mandali
Bapna Bol	Mithi	October 1930	Chimanlal Trivedi	Mumbai Gujarati Natak Mandali
Kutil Rajneeti	Vijli	January 1931	Gajendra Lalshankar Pandya	Mumbai Gujarati Natak Mandali
Karmasanjog	Koyal	21 January 1932	Mugatlal Pranjeevan Oza	Mumbai Gujarati Natak Mandali
Karyasiddhi (Hindi)	Neelgangu	1932	Munshi Abbas Ali	Mumbai Gujarati Natak Mandali
Gentleman Daku	Suman	1932	Joseph David	Mumbai Gujarati Natak Mandali
Kon Samrat?	Chandan	9 September 1933	'Manasvi' Prantijwala (adapted)	Mumbai Gujarati Natak Mandali
Koni Mahatta?	Sarita	1934	Manilal 'Pagal'	Mumbai Gujarati Natak Mandali
Kirtivijay	Sona	1934	'Manasvi' Prantijwala (adapted)	Mumbai Gujarati Natak Mandali
Janjeerna Zankare	Veera	13 September 1934	Champshi Udeshi	Mumbai Gujarati Natak Mandali
Sachcha Heera (Urdu)	Mithi	7 January 1935	Munshi Mohiyuddin Nazan	Mumbai Gujarati Natak Mandali
Mumbaini Badi	Sulochana	20 March 1935	Joseph David	Mumbai Gujarati Natak Mandali
Gheli Guniyal	Rangili	1 June 1935	Champshi Udeshi	Mumbai Gujarati Natak Mandali
Kevo Badmash?	Chanchal	3 August 1935	Joseph David	Mumbai Gujarati Natak Mandali
Kiritkumar	Manba	January 1936	Manilal 'Pagal'	Mumbai Gujarati Natak Mandali
Nepolean	Lucy	February 1936	Manilal 'Pagal'	Mumbai Gujarati Natak Mandali
Jobanna Jadu	Mohini	30 July 1936	Manilal 'Pagal'	Mumbai Gujarati Natak Mandali
Shetaranjna Dav	Madanika	15 May 1937	Jaman	Mumbai Gujarati Natak Mandali
Garibna Ansu	Prabhavati	7 August 1937	Champshi Udeshi	Mumbai Gujarati Natak Mandali
Sinhasanna Shokh	Ganga	December 1937	Babubhai Kalyanji Oza	Mumbai Gujarati Natak Mandali
Shrimant Ke Shaytan?	Lavangika	5 February 1937	Babubhai Kalyanji Oza	Mumbai Gujarati Natak Mandali
Samar-Prabha	Manjula	1938	Gajendra Lalshankar Pandya	Mumbai Gujarati Natak Mandali
Nyayi Naresh	Sundari	23 September 1938	Manilal 'Pagal'	Mumbai Gujarati Natak Mandali
Cinema ni Sundari	Nirmala	29 October 1938	Babubhai Kalyanji Oza	Mumbai Gujarati Natak Mandali
Sukhi Sansar	Mohini	19 November 1938	Manilal 'Pagal'	Mumbai Gujarati Natak Mandali
Rajadhiraj	Lalita	7 December 1938	Chimanlal Trivedi	Mumbai Gujarati Natak Mandali
Kalankit Kon?	Lady Lalna	19 March 1939	Chimanlal Trivedi	Mumbai Gujarati Natak Mandali
Kartavyapanthe	Kanti	26 July 1939	G. A. Vairati	Mumbai Gujarati Natak Mandali
Khavindne Khatar	Keti	5 September 1939	Firozgar	Mumbai Gujarati Natak Mandali
Suvarnaprabhat	Babli	16 January 1941	Haribhai M. Bhatt	Prabhat Kalamandal
Narsinh Bhagat Yane Sorathno Sant	Zumku	1941	Haribhai M. Bhatt	Prabhat Kalamandal
Mena Gurjari	Brahmin	1953	Rasiklal Parikh	
Mithyabhiman	Jivram Bhatt	19 June 1955	Dalpatram	
Vijaya	Kalipad (servant)	7 January 1956		
