= Culture of Gujarat =

The culture of Gujarat refers to the heritage and traditions of Gujarat.

== Gujarati engagement ceremony ==
Gol Dhana (ગોળ-ધાણા) is a Gujarati tradition in which jaggery and coriander seeds are eaten to celebrate a couple's engagement. They are distributed to the guests of the ceremony by the family of the groom. The giving of Gol Dhana symbolizes auspicious beginnings.

== Gujarati Hindu wedding ceremony ==
Marriage is seen as a highly auspicious occasion in Indian culture. According to the Vedas, the Hindu scriptures, marriage is a sacred, lifelong commitment that unites two souls. It is considered to be the strongest of all social bonds and is the initiation into a lifetime of togetherness.

The Vedic wedding ceremony consists of prayers, invocations, and vows recited in Sanskrit. The Vedic wedding ceremony dates back to over five thousand years and is performed under a decorated canopy, the mandap. The four pillars that surround the mandap represent the parents of the bride and groom. This signifies the important part they have played in raising their children to become the responsible adults they are today. The ceremony is performed before a sacred fire, or agniaa, which is the eternal witness of the marriage, and all vows are taken.

=== Parts of the ceremony ===
Every Hindu ceremony begins with the worship of Lord Ganesha, the deity of peace and wisdom. This is done so that people can find strength within themselves to remove any obstacles that may arise.

Varghodo (Wedding Procession)

The original form of a barat is a procession from the groom's house to the bride's house for the wedding ceremony. The wedding day begins with the Mangal-Vadya, the playing of the Shehnai (a traditional wind instrument) and the Dhol (an Indian drum).

Swagatam (Welcoming the groom and his family)

The groom and his family are greeted at the doors of the mandir (temple) by the bride's parents and family. The mother of the bride then greets and welcomes the groom and his family into her own family. She blesses the groom by placing a tilak (a red dot) on his forehead. The groom is then led to the mandap, where the wedding ceremony will take place.

Ganesh Puja (The worship of Lord Ganesh)

Madhuparka (Welcoming the groom)

While the groom is sitting under the mandap, the madhuparka is performed where his feet are washed by the bride's parents. He is then offered panchamrut, a drink composed of milk, yogurt, ghee, honey, and sugar.

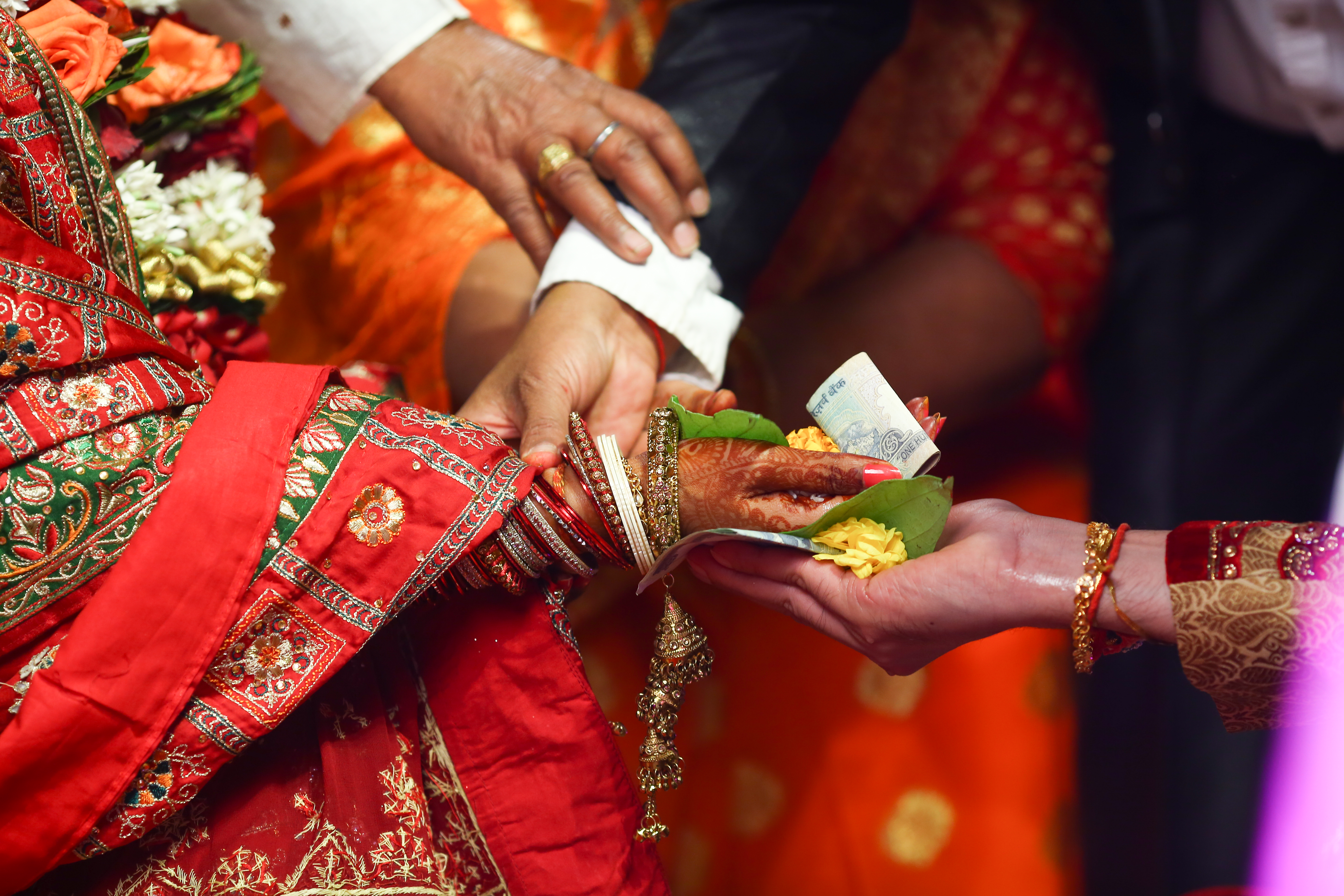
Kanyadaan Ceremony in a Gujarati, Hindu Wedding Ceremony

Kanyaa Daan (Giving away of the daughter)

The bride accepts her change of status from an unmarried woman to a wife by spreading turmeric powder on her hands. Kanya Daan is performed by the father (or uncle or guardian) of the bride in the presence of a large gathering that is invited to witness the wedding.

Vivaaha (Wedding)

The bride and the groom face each other, and the priest ties their garments (the bride's saree to the groom's shirt) in a knot, symbolizing the sacred union—the bride and the groom garland each other and exchange the rings. Next, the nuptial fire, symbolizing the divine witness, and the sanctifier of the sacrament, is installed and worshipped.

Both the bride and the groom grasp their hands together and pray to God for His blessings. Samagree, consisting of crushed sandalwood, herbs, sugar, rice, ghee (clarified butter), and twigs, is offered into the sacred fire to seek God's blessings for the couple.

Mangal Phera (Circumambulation of the sacred fire)

The groom holds the bride by the hand, and both walk four times around the sacred fire. Both offer oblations and recite appropriate Vedic hymns to the Gods for prosperity, good fortune, and conjugal fidelity. They touch each other's hearts and pray for the union of their hearts and minds.

Saptapadi (Seven sacred steps)

This is the most important rite of the entire ceremony. Here the bride and the groom take seven steps together around the sacred fire (Agni) and make the following seven promises to each other: As per the Vedic rituals, the groom sings, "With God as our guide, let us take":

1. The first step to nourish each other
2. The second step to grow together in strength
3. The third step to preserve our wealth
4. The fourth step to share our joys and sorrows
5. The fifth step to care for our children
6. The sixth step to be together forever
7. The seventh step to remain lifelong friends
8. The perfect halves to make a perfect whole!

The Satapadi ceremony concludes with a prayer that the union is indissoluble. At the end of this ceremony, the groom and the bride become husband and wife.

Mangal Sutra

The Mangal Sutra Dharana is the tying of the thread containing the marks of the Vishnu or Shiva on the neck of the bride by the groom.

Suhaag or Sindhoordana

The groom places sindoor (red powder) on the bride's hair, symbolizing her as a married woman.

Aashirvaad (Blessing)

The groom's parents bless the couple and offer clothes or flowers to the bride, symbolizing her joining the groom's family. All those assembled at the ceremony shower flowers on the couple and blessed them completing the marriage.

== Music and dance ==
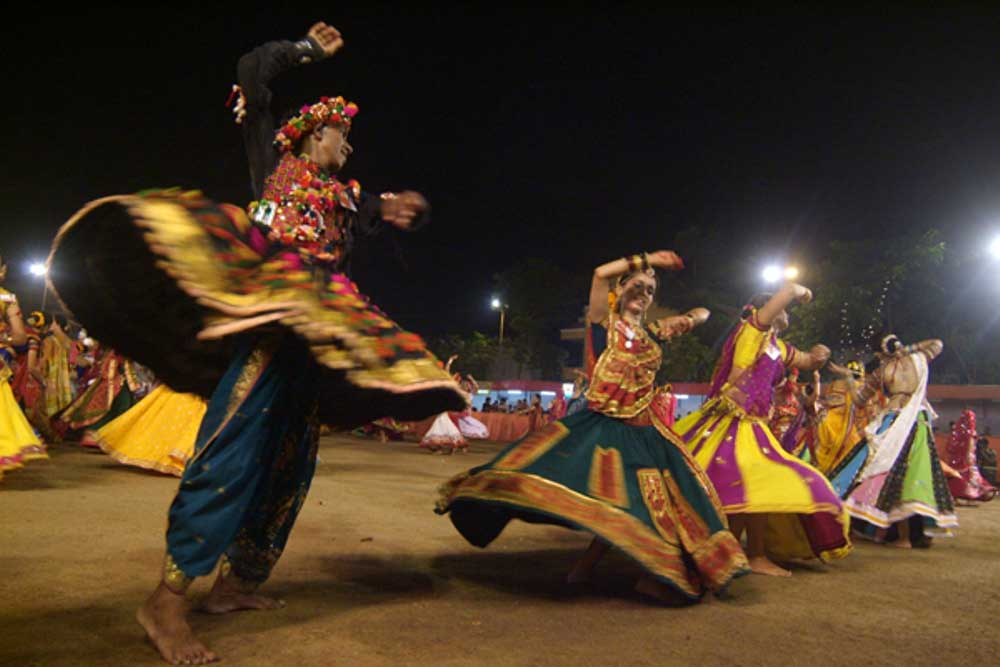
Garaba Raas

The traditional folk dance forms include Garba, Dandiya Raas, Tippani, Padhar, Sidi, and Dangi.

Dandiya Raas

Dandiya Raas is a romantic, energetic, colourful, and playful dance originating in the state of Gujarat. Its roots lay from the days of Lord Krishna, who played raas on the shores of Yamuna river on a moonlit night with his beloved Gopis.

Men and women dressed in colorful clothes dance in two concentric circles - one moving clockwise, one moving counter-clockwise. Men and women carry two bamboo sticks called dandiyas in their hands. In addition to footwork, this dance also includes the creative use of dandiyas.

The song sung on occasion is essentially an amorous one. Raas is a playful dance providing the opportunity for acting and exchanging messages through eye contact, offering opportunity for romances to bloom during Navratri.

Garba

Garba is a graceful form of dance mainly performed by women in a circular formation. It is in reverences of goddess Ambaji. The basics of the dance are singing and clapping rhythmically while going around the goddess. Today many modifications are prevalent to the basic pattern, and men are also free to join in. Women are dressed in embroidered, set in mirrors cholis, ghaghras, and bandhani dupattas. Extensive jewelry in the form of necklaces, bracelets and anklets are also worn. The typical dress code of men is kehediyu, chudidar, and a turban.

Garbi

Originally men used to perform this dance. It was on the way back from a battle that the victorious army would start dancing to couplets and amorous songs sung by the Charanswar, or the narrators who used to go to the front to raise the spirit during the battle by singing songs of valour. The dance was characterised by its forceful movements. Nowadays, women may also participate in the dance.

Padhar

It is performed by a rural community living around Nal Lake. In it, performers simulate the rhythmic movements of roving mariners and the undulating sea waves. The Bhil tribes, who live close to border tracts, and the Adivasis of Dangs district, have particularly lively folk dances.

== Theatre ==
The traditional forms of theatre include Bhavai and Akhyana.

== Gujarati cinema ==
Narshinh Mehta 1932 was the first Gujarati film

Before the arrival of talkies, there were several silent films that were closely related to Gujarati people and culture. Many film directors, producers, and actors who are associated with silent films were Gujarati and Parsi. There were twenty leading film companies and studios owned by Gujaratis between 1913 and 1931. They were mostly located in Bombay (now Mumbai). There were at least forty-four leading Gujarati directors during this period.

The Gujarati cinema dates back to 9 April 1932, when the first Gujarati film Narsinh Mehta was released. Leeludi Dharti (1968) was the first colour film of Gujarati cinema. After flourishing through the 1960s to 1980s, the industry saw a decline. The industry is revived in recent times. The film industry has produced more than one thousand films since its inception. In 2005, the Government of Gujarat announced a 100% entertainment tax exemption for Gujarati films.

Gujarati cinema is chiefly based on scripts from mythology to history and social to political. Since its origin, Gujarati cinema has experimented with stories and issues from Indian society. The films are generally targeted at the rural audience but after recent revival also caters audience with urban subjects.

== Languages of Gujarat ==
Gujarat is inhabited by people belonging to varied castes, religions, and communities. Due to that, a number of varied languages are spoken in the state. The official language of the state is Gujarati. It is an Indo-Aryan language derived from Sanskrit. Gujarati is the 26th-most widely spoken language in the world. In addition, it has eleven dialects, spoken in different parts of the state.

Gujarat shares its borders with the states of Maharashtra, Madhya Pradesh, and Rajasthan. Therefore, there is a small population that speaks the respective languages of the different states also, namely Marwari, Hindi, and Marathi. Apart from this, Urdu and Sindhi are also spoken in Gujarat. Kutch is one of the important areas in the state. It has an independent identity and is growing popular among tourists. The mother tongue of the people of Kutch is Kachchi. It is an important language of the region.

Another part of Gujarat is Saurashtra, which is also referred to as West Gujarat or Kathiyawad. The mother tongue of these people is Kathiyawadi Gujarati which is spoken in seven different districts in Saurashtra. Rajkot is the financial capital of Saurashtra. Saurashtra is also known for giving many saints and great men like Mahatma Gandhi. The young population migrated to different cities like Ahmedabad, Surat, and Vadodara due to employment problems.

== Literature ==
Gujarati literature's history may be traced to 1000 AD. Since then, literature has flourished till date. Well-known laureates of Gujarati literature are Hemchandracharya, Narsinh Mehta, Mirabai, Akho, Premanand Bhatt, Shamal Bhatt, Dayaram, Dalpatram, Narmad, Govardhanram Tripathi, Mahatma Gandhi, K. M. Munshi, Umashankar Joshi, Suresh Joshi, Pannalal Patel, and Rajendra Keshavlal Shah .

Kavi Kant and Kalapi are famous Gujarati poets.

Gujarat Vidhya Sabha, Gujarat Sahitya Sabha, and Gujarati Sahitya Parishad are Ahmedabad based literary institutions promoting the spread of Gujarati literature. Saraswatichandra is a landmark novel by Govardhanram Tripathi. Writers like Suresh Dalal, Jyotindra Dave, Tarak Mehta, Harkisan Mehta, Chandrakant Bakshi, Vinod Bhatt, Kanti Bhatt, Makarand Dave, and Varsha Adalja have influenced Gujarati thinkers.

A huge contribution to Gujarati language literature came from the Swaminarayan paramhanso, like Bramhanand, Premanand, with prose like Vachanamrut and poetry in the form of bhajans.

Gujarati theatre owes a lot to bhavai. Bhavai is a musical performance of stage plays. Ketan Mehta and Sanjay Leela Bhansali explored the artistic use of bhavai in films such as Bhavni Bhavai, Oh Darling! Yeh Hai India! and Hum Dil De Chuke Sanam. Dayro (gathering) involves singing and conversation, reflecting on human nature.

== Religions ==
In Gujarat, there has been several great religious figures. Sant Dadu Dayal (1554–1660) a saint-poet and a major Bhakti figure from Ahmedabad, treated equally both Rama as names of God and became popular in Northern India. He wrote, "The illusion of Rama hath been dispelled by my mind; since I see Thee in all."

Gujarat is also the home of Gandhi, who preached unity between all religions and became a worldwide figure for peaceful struggle against tyranny.

=== Hinduism ===
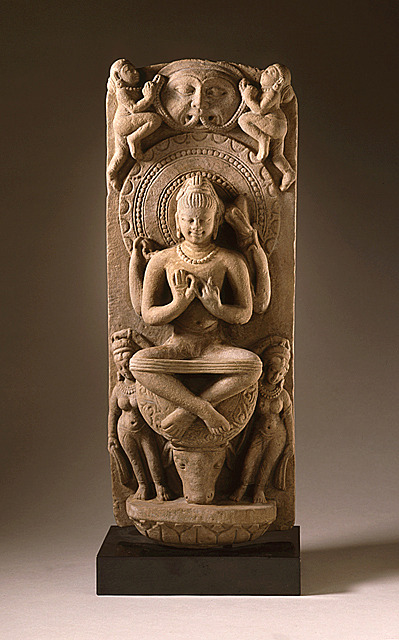
Lakulisha was born in modern-day Gujarat

Gujarat is a part of the ancient Indus Valley Civilization. Many Hindu religious traditions developed in Gujarat.

Gujarat is the birthplace of Lord Shiva's Avatar Lakulisa (Staff-God). He established the Pasupata Shaivite tradition (one of the six major schools of Shaivism) in 2 A.D. or 3 A.D. According to some traditions he was born in Kayarohana or Kayavatara in Saurashtra while other traditions hold that it was Karavana, in the modern-day town of Dabhoi Taluka near Baroda, another that it was Ulkapuri (modern Avakhal) and another that it was in Braoch or Bharuch. From Gujarat, it spread north to Kashmir, South to Tamil Nadu, East to Nepal (where the Pashupatinath Temple stills exist popularly.)

==== Bhakti movement ====
The Bhakti movement was very popular in Gujarat, where devotees of both Islam and Hinduism focused on the worship of God, trying to rid any separations based on faith in God.

Swami Chakradhara was another major figure of the Bhakti movement, born in Gujarat in 1194 A.D. and he is believed to be the avatar of Vishnu. Chakradhar Swami established the Mahanubhava, Vaishnavite sect, which spread to Maharashtra as well. The sect still exists today in Gujarat and Maharashtra.

Sant Kilha was another Vaishnavite saint of Gujarat born to a Subedar (army man) father. He was the disciple of Krishnasdas (of Jaipur) and became his successor at the seat of Galta - Kilha's branch became known as the "Tapasa branch". Besides Ram Bhakti (devotion to Lord Rama), he was also inclined towards yog-sadhana and this is why he was made acharya of the Galta Gaddi. He is said to be the founder of the Khati sect.

Jalaram, a devotee of Lord Rama is another popular figure. Jalarama's birthday is still celebrated by Gujarati (in Gujarat and abroad) as Jalaram Jayanti.

Swami Sahajanand, better known as Swaminarayan settled in Gujarat from Uttar Pradesh. Today the Swaminarayan movement is very large in Gujarat.

=== Jainism ===
Gujarat is home to one of the largest Jain communities in India.

Shrimad Rajchandra was a Jain poet, philosopher, scholar, and reformer, best known for his teachings on Jainism and as a spiritual guide of Mahatma Gandhi.

Gandhi's mother was also Jain.

=== Zoroastrianism ===
Zoroastrianism first arrived in Gujarat around 9th century AD. Parsis migrated from Greater Iran to Gujarat and Sindh between the 8th and 10th century CE to avoid the persecution of Zoroastrians following the Muslim conquest of Persia. Since then, the Zoroastrians have flourished in the present day Gujarat and Mumbai. The holy cities of Parsis are also located in Gujarat, like Udvada, their primary site.

Arrival in Gujarat: According to the Qissa-i Sanjan, the only existing account of the early years of Zoroastrian refugees in India composed at least six centuries after their tentative date of arrival, the first group of immigrants originated from Greater Khorasan.[18] This historical region of Central Asia is in part in northeastern Iran, where, it constitutes modern Khorasan Province, part of western/northern Afghanistan, and in part in three Central-Asian republics, namely Tajikistan, Turkmenistan, and Uzbekistan. According to the Qissa, the immigrants were granted permission to stay by the local ruler, Jadi Rana, on the condition that they adopt the local language (Gujarati), that their women adopt local dress (the sari), and that they henceforth cease to bear arms.[19] The refugees accepted the conditions and founded the settlement of Sanjan, which is said to have been named after the city of their origin (Sanjan, near Merv, modern Turkmenistan).[18] This first group was followed by a second group from Greater Khorasan within five years of the first, and this time having religious implements with them (the alat). In addition to these Khorasanis or Kohistanis "mountain folk", as the two initial groups are said to have been initially called,[20] at least one other group is said to have come overland from Sari, Iran.[21] This religion founded by Zarathustra Spitma (better known as "Zoroaster") resembles Hinduism in many ways (although differing as a strict monotheism too.)

For example, in this religion, the cow is very sacred. In the 9th chapter of the Vendidad of the Avesta, the purificatory power of cow urine is dilated upon. It is declared to be a panacea for all bodily and moral evils. It is drunk as well as applied externally as is done by Hindus also. The urine of the bull, called "nirang," is brought to the house of an orthodox Parsi every morning and is (like cow milk) applied to the face, hands, and feet.

The Zoroastrians—a.k.a. Parsi and Irani, due to their ancient heritage—entered Gujarat from the Persian Empire.

They constitute economically powerful section with many businesses in India.

=== Gujarati Muslims ===
The term "Gujarati Muslim" is usually used to signify an Indian Muslim from the State of Gujarat who speaks the Gujarati language as a mother-tongue (first language) and follows certain customs different from the rest of Indian Muslims.

Gujarat was one of the first places the Muslims came to India. King Arjun of Gujarat permitted a Muslim trader from Ormuz to build a mosque in Gujarat and even paid for the expenses of a certain Shiite festival. (p. 185 An Advanced History of India By Ramesh Chandra Majumdar, Kalikinkar Datta, Hemchandra Raychaudhuri)

The Sufi saints are very popular in Gujarat. Shaykh Makhu was a Sufi saint of the Shattari lineage (p. 185 An Advanced History of India By Ramesh Chandra Majumdar, Kalikinkar Datta, Hemchandra Raychaudhuri). Since Gujarat is situated on the western border of India, there was a direct interaction with the people of Arabia and Persia. Many Gujarati Saints and Sufis became famous. Among them, the names of Sheikh Ganjul lim (1381), Syed Burhanuddin (1411), and Sheikh Wajihuddin Alvi are well known.

Gujarati Muslims are very prominent in industry and sports, and there is a very large Gujarati Muslim community in Mumbai. Several Gujarati Muslim communities are:

- Memon
- Dawoodi Bohra
- Khoja
- Sunni Vora (aka "Vora Patel")
- Surti Muslims
- Pathan

There are many famous Gujarati Muslims:

- Muhammad Ali Jinnah
- Abdullah Yusuf Ali (translator and commentator of the Quran)
- Azim Premji (son of founder of multinational Wipro and current chairman)
- Badruddin Tyabji
- Ismail Merchant
- Tiger Memon (infamous)
- Irfan Pathan
- Yusuf Pathan
- Zaheer Khan
- Munaf Patel
- Sajid Nadiadwala
- Farooq Shaikh
- Parveen Babi
- Ismail Darbar

== Fairs and festivals ==
=== Fairs ===
Around more than a 1000 festivals are celebrated in Gujarat—the state is known as the land of fairs and festivals. Some of these fairs and festivals are as follows:

Bhavnath Mahadev Mela (February)

The Bhavnath Mahadev Temple, situated at the foot of Mount Girnar in the city of Junagadh, is the site of the Bhavnath Mahadev fair held for five days in February, during the festival of Mahashivratri. The Mahapuja of Lord Shiva takes place at midnight in this temple on the 14th day of the dark half of the month of Magh. When the puja (prayer ceremony), Naga Bavas (naked sages) living nearby move towards the fair seated on elephants, holding flags and blowing conch shells. It is firmly believed that Lord Shiva himself visits the shrine on this occasion. Visitors are served free meals by the organizers. Special stalls sell idols, rosaries, or holy beads (brought by vendors from Ayodhya and Mathura), utensils of brass and copper, sweets, and fruits. The Bhavnath Mahadev Temple is surrounded by many equally ancient and holy places.

Dangs Darbar (March)

Dangs Darbar is the name of the annual fair held every year in Ahwa, the most important town in the Dangs, a few days before Holi. The Dangs is one of the most delightful districts of Gujarat and is located high in the Saputara hills, the original home of the adivasis, the tribal population of Gujarat. The name "Darbar" dates back to the time of the British, when a darbar of Rajas and Naiks of neighbouring area used to assemble there. Today it is called Jamabandi Darbar, and the District Collector officiates at it. Thousands of tribal people flock to Ahwa from all over the district, dressed in bright colours, sounding the Shehnai, and beating their drums. Folk dances, dramas, and songs enliven the air during the festival.

Chitra — Vichitra Mela (March)

This fair, one of the largest purely Adivasi (tribal) fairs, is attended by around 60,000 to 70,000 tribal people. It takes place every year in the village of Gunbhakhari in Sabarkantha district, very near the borders of Rajasthan. It is held a fortnight after Holi, the festival of colours. The site of the fair is attractive as the temple overlooks the rivers Sabarmati, Akul, and Vyakul. The name of the fair is derived from Chitrangada and Vichitraviraya, the sons of King Shantanu, who are believed to have lived there and been cured of diseases which afflicted them. The fair attracts large numbers of Bhils (tribals) who come from all the surrounding districts using every imaginable form of transport. The Garasis and Bhil tribals dress in their customary colourful costumes. The costume of the men generally consists of a blue shirt, dhoti, and a red or saffron turban. Women don ghaghras (embroidered skirts), which have a circumference of as much as 20 yards (18 m) and are covered from head to foot with ornate and heavy silver jewellery. They use liquid kumkum (vermilion) to colour their cheeks and lips a brilliant red, while their eyes are outlined with kajal (kohl). Every group that comes to the fair carries its own drum making the atmosphere come alive with the incessant beat of numerous drums. The women sing folk songs, and everyone dances. The dancing and drumming continue for hours until everyone is exhausted. Over a hundred stalls hold food and drink and sweets of various kinds. Silver ornaments can be bought, and household articles, as well. Here, as in other fairs, there is a giant wheel and a merry-go-round which never ceases to spin.

Dhrang Fair (April)

Around 40 km from Bhuj, it is known for the samadhi of the famous saint Mekran Dada who served the community with great love and dedication and won their devotion. He was supposed to be the incarnation of Lakshmanji. A large fair is held on Magh Vad when a large number of Dada's followers from different parts of Gujarat and Rajasthan come to the Samadhi and participate in religious rituals.

Trinetreshwar Mahadev Fair (September–October)

The small hamlet of Tarnetar, about 75 kilometers from Rajkot, is the site for one of Gujarat's most well-known annual fairs, held here during the first week of Bhadrapad (September–October). This fair is primarily a "marriage mart" or "Swayamvar" for the tribal youth of today who still visit Tarnetar, to find them a suitable bride. The tribal youth elegantly dressed in colourful dhotis, waistcoats, and eye-catching turbans come to be chosen by village belles dressed in colourful finery. Like all important tribal fairs, it is attended by tribes from the adjoining areas who indulge in dancing, competitive sports, and other such forms of entertainment. There are over 300 stalls selling food, refreshments, exhibiting embroidery and cattle shows. The bachelors are usually identified by their large, colourful embroidered umbrellas and their distinctive hairstyles. These umbrellas, which have become emblems of the fair, are embroidered by the tribal youth for over a year. The fair is held around the Trinetreshwar Temple, which was dedicated to the three-eyed Lord Shiva and built at the beginning of the century. There is a kund (reservoir) here, and it is popularly believed that a dip in its waters is as holy as a dip in the sacred River Ganges. The reservoir is also known as papanshu (the destroyer of sins).

Vautha Mela (November)

This fair is held every year at Vautha where two rivers, the Sabarmati and the Vatrak, meet. Like most fair sites in India, this also has both mythological and current religious associations. The Vautha Mela site is 3 square miles (7.8 km^{2}) in the area. Legends hold that Kartik Swami or Kartikeya, the son of Lord Shiva, visited the site. This is why the fair is held during Kartika Purnima, the full moon night of the month of Kartik, corresponding to November. The site, also known as Saptasangam, is at the confluence of seven rivers. The most important Shiva temple here is the temple of Siddhanath.

What is most significant about this fair is that it is the only major animal trading fair in Gujarat and is on par with the famous camel fair at Pushkar, Rajasthan. However, the only animals traded here are donkeys. About 4,000 donkeys are brought every year for sale, usually by Vanjara (gypsy) traders. The pilgrims who visit Vautha during the fair are from several communities and include farmers, labourers, and people belonging to several castes.

Shamlaji Melo (November)

The Shamlaji Melo, also called the Kartik Purnima fair, is held in the month of November every year and lasts for about two weeks. It is attended by almost two hundred thousand people from adjoining districts and even from Rajasthan. Devotees belong to various castes and communities, including the Garasias and Bhils throng to this festival. These pilgrims come in groups, singing devotional songs and carrying religious banners to have a darshan (worship) of the deity at the Shamlaji Temple. The Shamlaji Temple is a renowned Vaishnav Shrine, and the deity housed here is known by various names included Gadadhar (bearer of the mace) and Shaksi Gopal. The fair is also popular with the tribal people of the area, particularly the Bhils, who revere Shamlaji, the deity they refer to as "Kalio Bavji", the dark divinity. The temple is of great archaeological significance as it was built in the 11th century. Apart from a darshan of the deity in the temple, the pilgrims consider a bath in the river Meshwo essential.

Tarnetar Fair

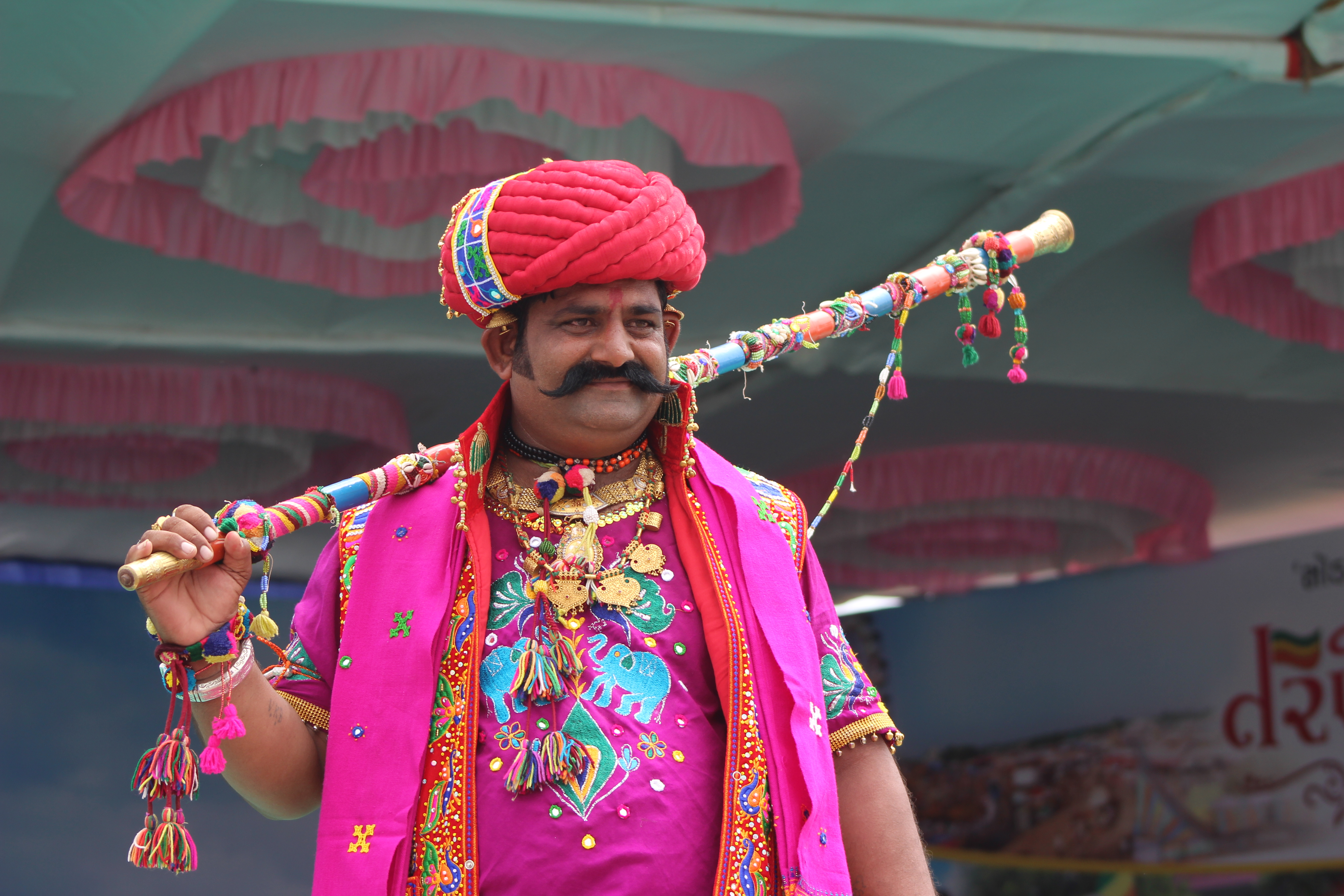
A man in traditional costumes during Tarnetar fair.

The venkatareddy Tarnetar Fair is one of the most happening events in Gujarat and is held at the Temple of Shiva or Trinetreshwar (three-eyed god), popularly known as Tarnetar. Popular belief associates the village with the Swayamwar (marriage) of Draupadi after Arjun performed the Mastsyavedh, a unique feat of archery. Villagers from all over the state, dressed in their traditional costumes and jewelry, flock to Tarnetar. The Rasada is a folk dance performed by hundreds of women moving in a single circle, dancing to the accompaniment of four drums and jodja pava (double flutes). It is in district Surendranagar.

Kutch Utsav

The Kutch Mahotsava, is usually organized during the end of February and the beginning of March. The Kutch region in Gujarat abounds with splendid beaches, fascinating wildlife, and beautiful palaces and monuments.

Sanskruti kunj Fair

The Sanskruti kunj Festival shows the different cultures of the states of India. It is organized in the winter session in the capital city, Gandhinagar. All the competitors of India come during this fair and show their state's culture & dance.

It is a 10-day long festival, and this located on the bank of river Sabarmati over 12-hector landscaped land. Timing for sanskruti kunj between 2.00 pm to 10.00 pm and every evening from 7.30 pm, the folk song and dance performances would be presented.

Shamlaji Fair

The Shamlaji shrine and the site boast of an ancient and glorious heritage. Thousands of tribal people flock to the Shamlaji fair. (Shamalaji is also known as Gadadhar Dev, whose Name is also reflected in the Thousand Name of Lord Vishnu Also known as Vihnu Sahastra Nama, who Created Bhrahma, and Bhrahma Created This World. Those who had crossed Bhrahma Is known as Parbhrahma, who claim Himself as Allah but He also does not know that in Lord Vishnu, who seems to be idle in whom Thousands of Universe takes birth every moment and get destroyed every moment. Still, he fulfills the desire of Bhakta. Bhakta associates or joins himself with Lord Vishnu, who is also known as Shree Krishna. Famous Saint Narsimh Mehta write Hundi on the name of Shmalia Sheth in the time of his distress, a type of promissory note which was honored by Shree Krishna. Shri Narsimh Mehta wrote poetry in the honor of Shri Krishna that became Mahatma Gandhi's prayer song.

Vautha No Melo

Situated at the confluence of two rivers near Ahmedabad, the site attracts people of all communities. Animals, particularly donkeys and camels, are sold in large numbers during this fair.

=== Festivals ===
Other than nationally observed festivals, some festivities are specific to Gujarat.

Makar Sankranti and Kite Flying Festival (14 January)

The Kite Flying Festival takes place in mid-January and marks the time when the sun's direct rays reach the Tropic of Capricorn after the winter solstice. It is celebrated with much folk music, dance and kite flying. People of Gujarat gather on terraces to fly kites of various colours to celebrate Makar Sakranti or Uttrayana, the welcome to the sun after the cold winter months. Glass-strengthened threads of the Indian fighter kites are matched against each other in the air — the kite fighter who cuts the other thread is the victor. At night, kites with Chinese lanterns are flown and held aloft. Food such as Undhiya, sugar cane juice, and local sweets is typically served to celebrate the day.

Dance Festival — Modhera (January)

Resting on a knoll in the village of Modhera are the ruins of the 11th-century Sun Temple. The outer walls of the temple are covered with sculptures in which the figures of Surya, the sun god, are prominent. The Sun Temple is the site of an annual festival of Indian classical dances organized by the Tourism Corporation of Gujarat. The idea is to present classical dance forms in the atmosphere they were originally presented in.

The Kutch Mahotsav (February–March)

The 'Kutch Festival' or the 'Rann festival' is celebrated at the time of the Shiv Ratri in February/ March. The centre of the festival is Bhuj in Kutch. It has crafts, fairs, and folk dances and music and cultural shows, all organized by the Gujarat Tourism. Tours are also conducted out to the ruins of Dhola Vera, a city that was once a part of the Indus Valley civilization.

Bhadra Purnima (September)

The full moon of Bhadrapad is one of the four most important festival days of the year when farmers and agriculturists come to Ambaji, a place that derives its name from Goddess Ambaji, whose shrine is located there. On this occasion, a large fair is organized on full moon days. In the evening, performances of Bhavai, the folk drama of the state are held, and Garba programmes are organized. The devout attend readings of the Saptashati, the seven hundred verses in praise of the goddess, and visit the temple for a darshan (worship) of her. The Ambaji shrine is the principal shrine of the goddess in Gujarat, and its origins are still unknown. The Temple of Ambaji is recognized as one of the original Shakti Pithas (religious texts) where, according to the ancient Scriptures, the heart of the goddess Ambaji fell to earth when her body was dismembered. A triangular Vishwa Yantra, inscribed with figures and the syllable 'Shree' in the centre, represents the deity. There is no idol, which testifies the temple's antiquity. Idol worship became popular much later.

== Gujarati cuisine ==
The food served in the South of Gujarat is influenced by the cuisine of Maharashtra. In South Gujarat, people usually consume Jowar, whereas, in Saurashtra and North Gujarat, the diet consists mainly of Bajra and Maize. In Baroda, you will find a blend of all tastes due to its location. In earlier times, wheat was consumed only by the elite and by the middle class during the festive season. With changing time, things have changed. Today, wheat forms an integral part of the Gujarati platter and is used in a number of ways.

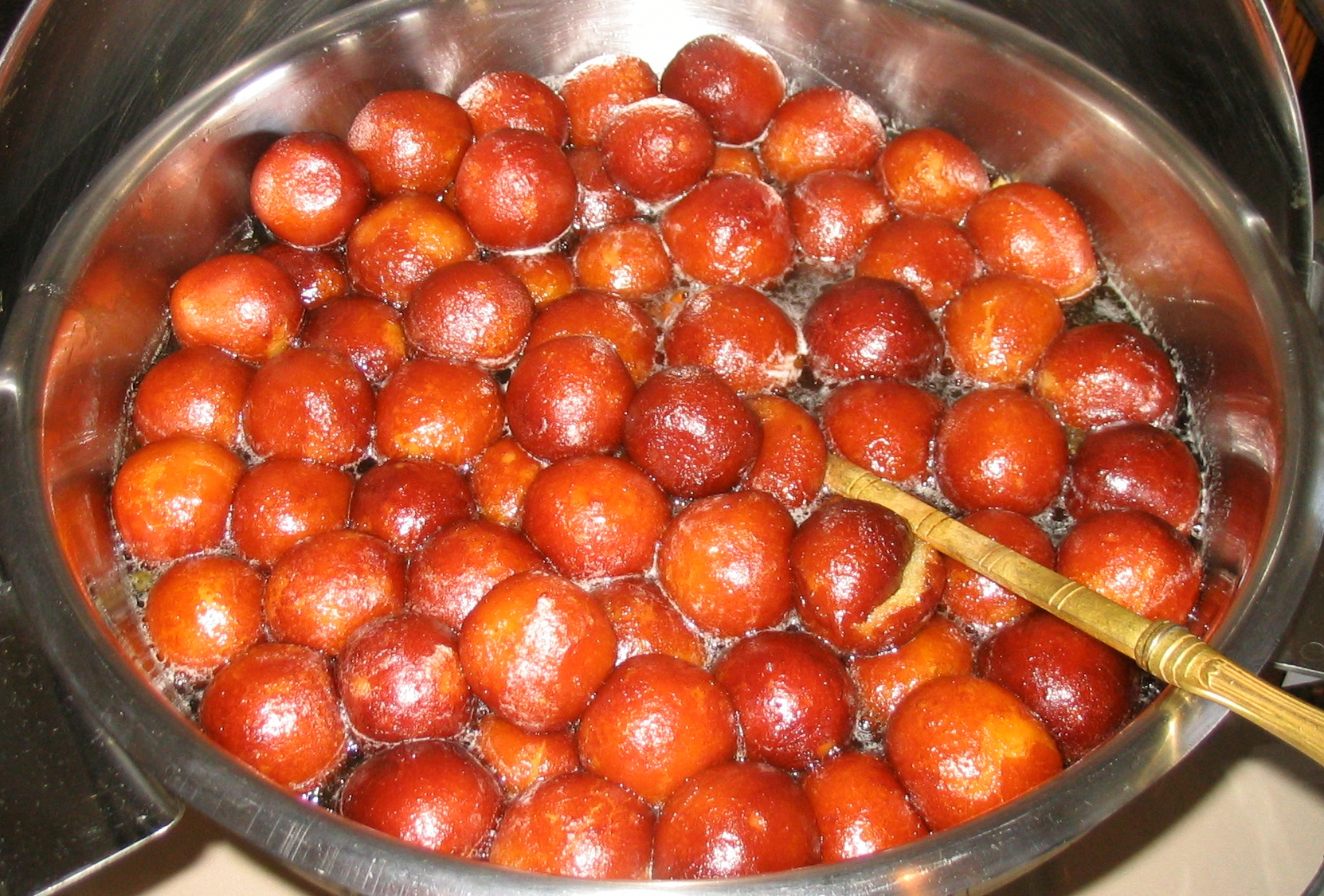
Gulab Jamun

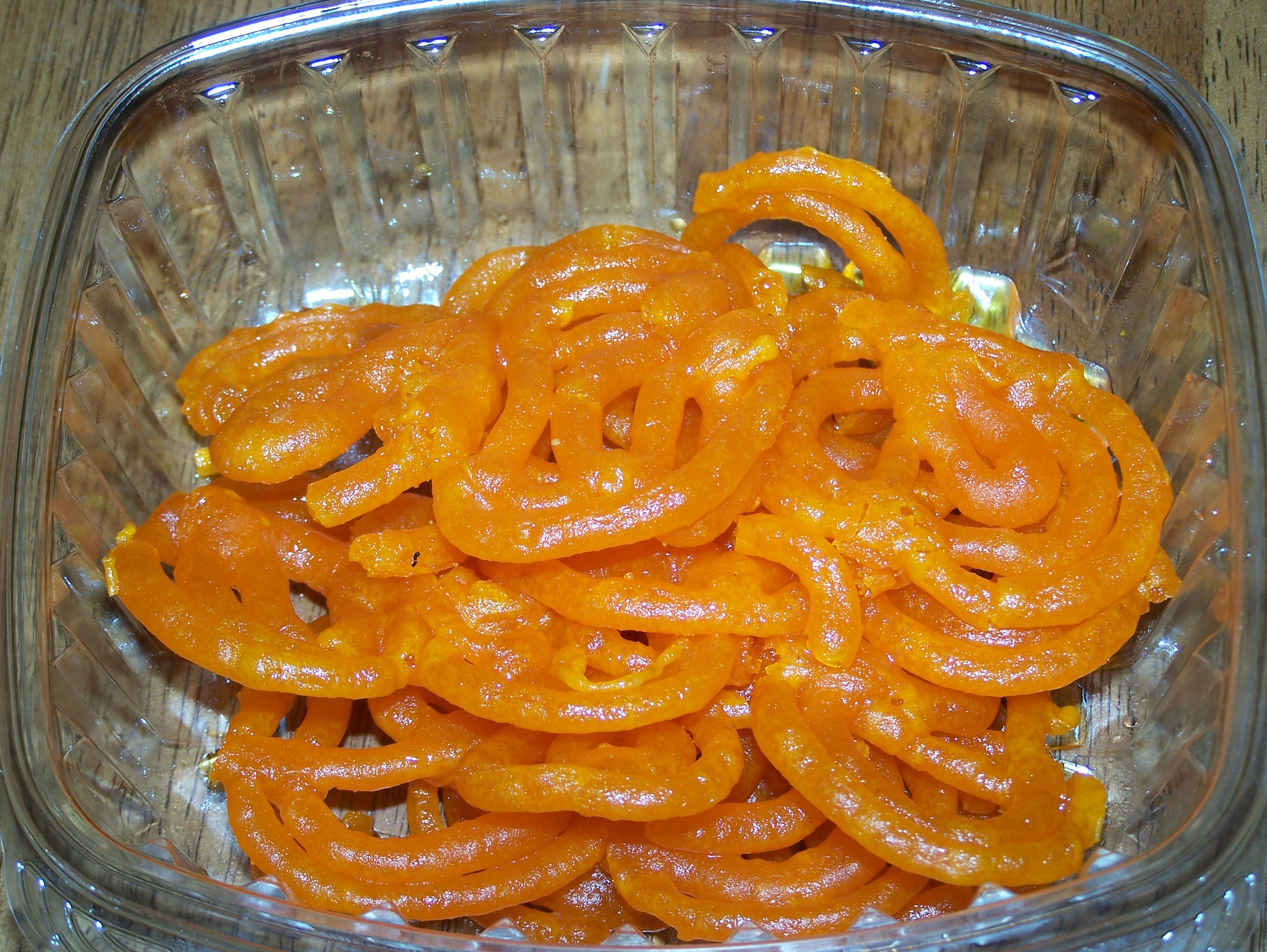
Jalebi

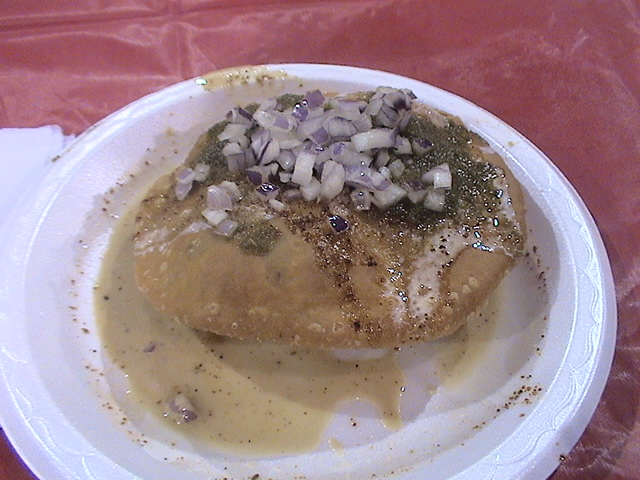
Kachori

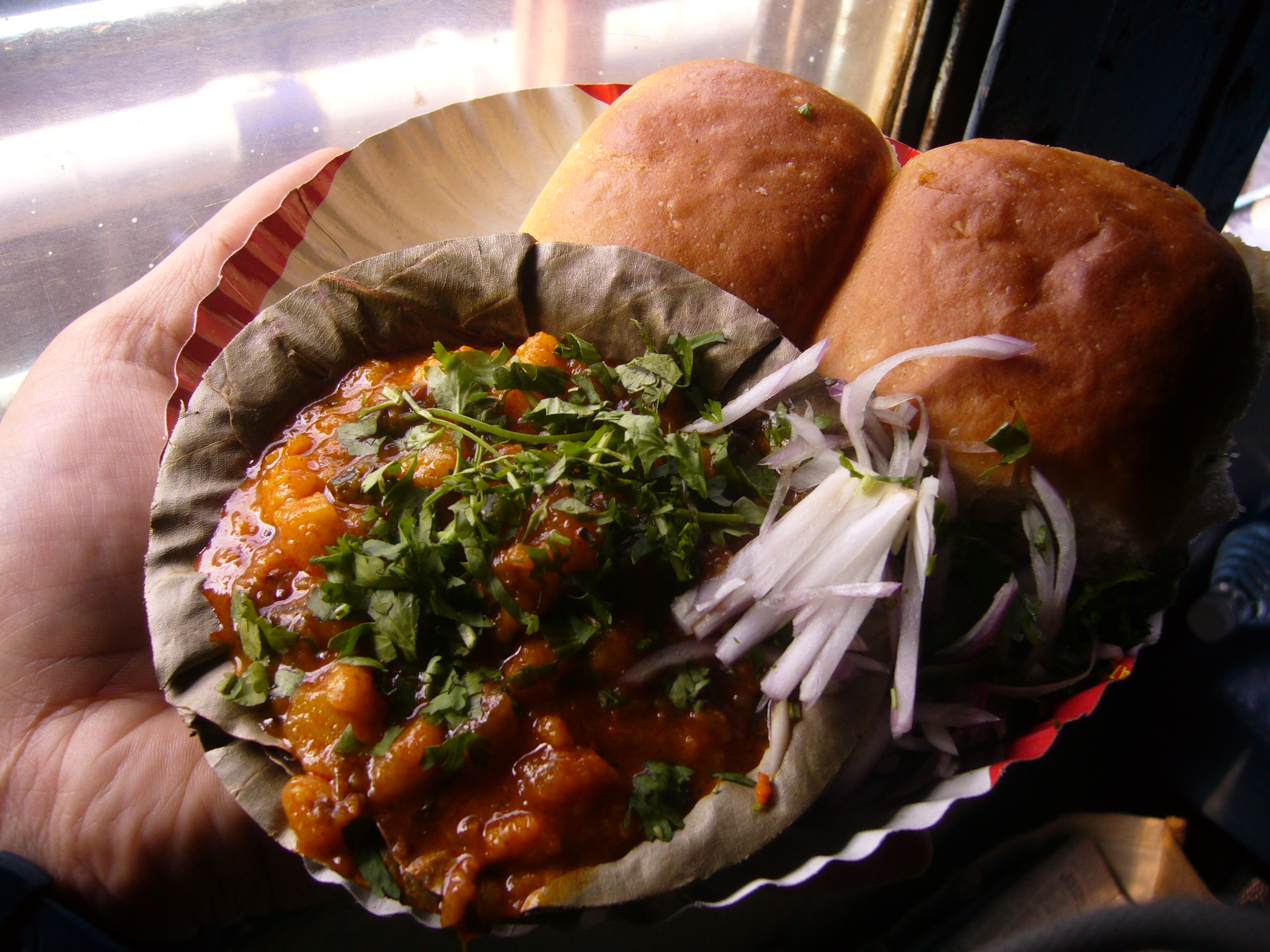
Pav Bhaji

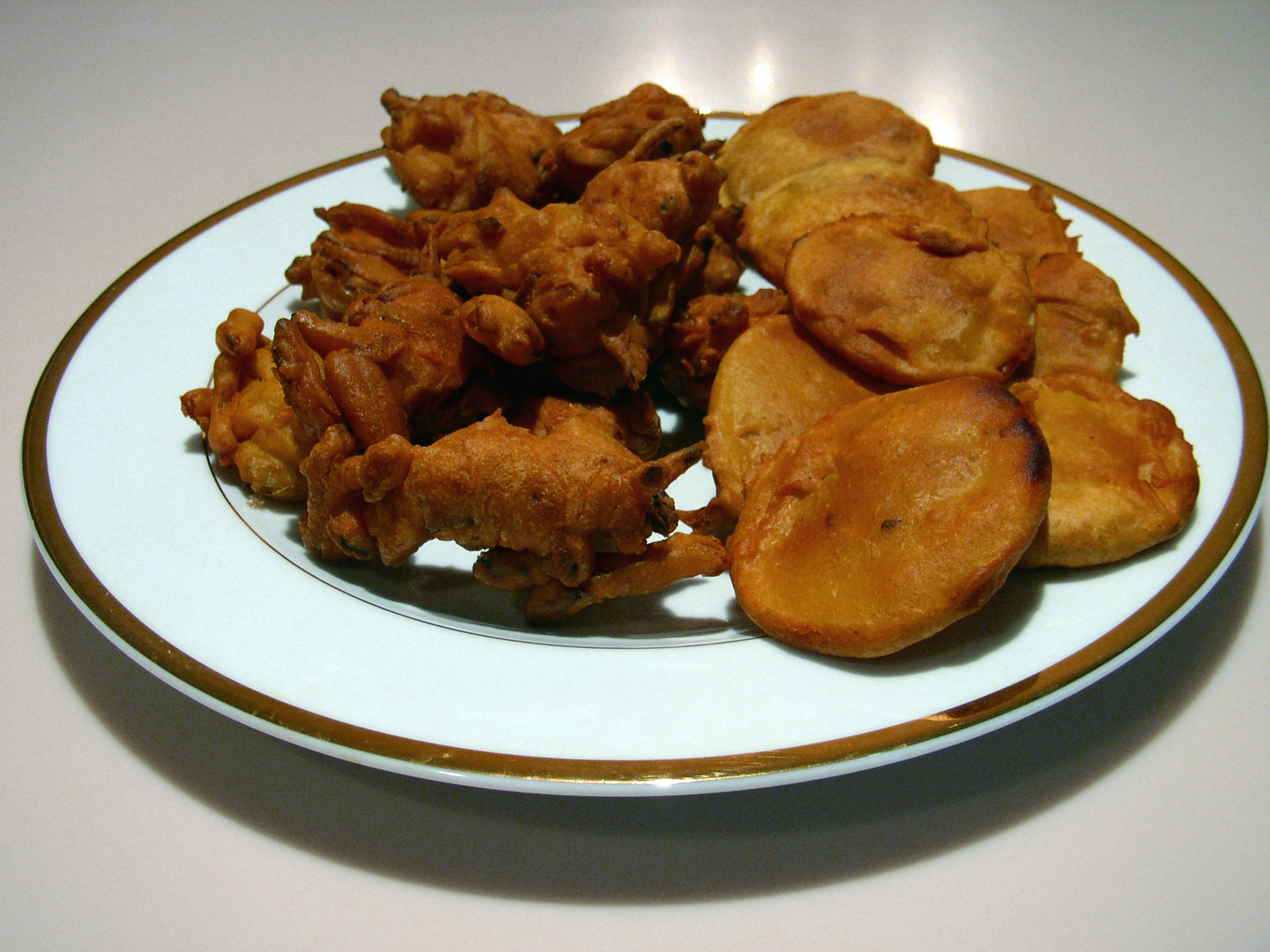
Bhajias (Pakoras)

Sweets

- Basundi
- Doodh Pak
- Gajar ka Halwa
- Gulab Jambu
- Jalebi
- Ladoo
  - Bundi na Ladoo
  - Churma na Ladoo
  - Tal na Lado
  - Sing na Ladoo
- Chikki
  - Dalia ni Chikki
  - Shing Ni Chikki
  - Tal ni Chikki(particularly for winter)
- Puran Puri
- Vedvi (similar to Puran Poli but fully dipped in ghee)
- ShriKhand (particularly in Summer)
- Mohan Thal
- Magas
- Barfi
- Ghari
  - Surati Ghari
  - Bhavnagari Ghari
- Sutarfeni
- Kaju Katri
- Golpapdi (jeggari and wheat-flour )
- Barfi Churmu
- Rabdi
- Khaja
- Dudhi no Halwo (and Mung Dal No Halwo Particularly for Marriage)
- Badam Ni Chaki(Particularly Offer to Lord Shrinathji of Nathdwara)
- Pista Ni Chaki(Particularly Offer to Lord Shrinathji of Nathdwara)
- Morning Sherow (Wheat Halwo)
- MaisurPack

Snacks

- Bhajias/Pakoras
- Pav Bhaji
- Chana Dal Wada
- Kutchi Dabeli
- Dal Wada
- Dhokla
- Locho
- Farsi Puri
- Ganthias
- Handvo
- Kachori
- Khandvi
- Muthias
- Sev-Usual
- Bhel
- Panipuri
- Fafda
- Chevdo
- Bhakharvadi
- Chavanu/Surti bhusu
- Jain Chevdo
- Patra
- Gatha

Pulses (Dals)Kadhi

- Mixed Dal
- Moong Dal
- Plain Dal
- Tuver Dal
- Udad Dal
- Kadhi
- Dhal Dhokli

Vegetables

- Batata Suki Bhaji
- Cabbage Peas
- Cauliflower-Green Peas
- Methi Mutter
- Okra
- Sev-Tomatoes
- Undhiyu

== The chewing of Betel leaves (paan) in Gujarat ==
The chewing of the betel leaf, known as paan in Gujarati, is part of many Asian cultures, especially those of China and Vietnam. Preparation techniques vary from using hands to feet to help in grinding and extracting exotic flavours. The nut is either slivered or grated, often flavored with spices according to local tradition and usually wrapped in a betel leaf (betel leaf comes from the betel pepper plant, Piper betle, which is not botanically related to the betel palm, Areca catechu), along with some lime (calcium oxide or calcium hydroxide) to better extract the alkaloids. Some people also chew tobacco, marijuana, or cocaine along with betel nut. After about 20 minutes of chewing, the fibrous residue which remains of the nut is spat out onto the street, where it remains visible due to its characteristic bright red color.

In Gujarat, betel (paan) chewing is as popular as tobacco smoking is global. Paan is often served wrapped in a betel leaf.

In Gujarat and the rest of India, paan has played an important part in social life and customs for hundreds of years. In the courts of Medieval Rulers, the betel leaf or paan was offered as part of hospitality, friendship, and love. Kings also relished betel leaves after sex.

The different types of paans are:

- Saada paan, a mixture of cardamom, betel nut, and cloves.
- Chutney paan, a mixture of cardamom, betel nut, and spicy mint paste.
- Meetha paan, a mixture of grated coconut, dates, gulkand (rose petal and sugar syrup), and jellied fruit.
- thook paan, a special mixture of sugar, and amylase
- Tobacco paan, a mixture of tobacco of different brands, and betel nut.

Using paan with tobacco significantly increases the risk of mouth cancers. Even without tobacco, the use of paan has been associated with changes in the lining of the mouth that increase the risk of cancer of the mouth.

== See also ==
- Architecture of Gujarat
- Godadi
