= Mena Gurjari (play) =

1930 Gujarati play by Rasiklal Parikh

- Original language: Gujarati
- Written by: Rasiklal Parikh
- Characters: Mena; Rupa; Shobha; Amthikaki; Sasu; Shahjado; Brahmin
- First publication: 1930
- Genre: musical folk play

Mena Gurjari (Gujarati: મેનાં ગુજરી) is a Gujarati musical folk play by Indian playwright Rasiklal Parikh. Based on the folk legend and written in folk theatre style of Bhavai, the play is regarded as one of the most influential works in modern Gujarati theatre.

== Background ==
Parikh adapted the traditional folk legend of Mena Gurjari into a musical play in the Bhavai tradition of Gujarati folk theatre. The play combines elements of folk music, dance, and drama. It was first published in the Gujarati literary journal Prasthan and was later staged by Natmandal, a theatre school operated by Gujarat Vidhya Sabha. The original production was directed by Jaishankar 'Sundari'.

== Characters ==
Principal characters are:

- Mena Gurjari - a woman belonging to the Gurjar community of Mandavgarh, married to Kunwar Chandaji Thakor of Gokulgarh.
- Rupa - a villager and friend of Mena
- Shobha - a villager and friend of Mena
- Amthikaki - an elder lady from the village
- Shahjado - a prince from the Sultan's camp
- Hiro - brother-in-law of Mena
- Brahmin - a villager
- Sasu - mother-in-law of Mena

== Plot ==
Mena, a woman of the Gurjar community from Mandavgarh, is married to Kunwar Chandaji Thakor of Gokulgarh. While on her way to sell butter, she notices the Sultan's camp and, out of curiosity, goes to see it. The Sultan is captivated by her beauty and takes her captive. Mena is rescued by her husband, her brother-in-law Hiraji, and fellow Gurjar villagers and brought back home. However, her mother-in-law refuses to accept her and continues to taunt her. Unable to bear the humiliation, the self-respecting Mena leaves home and merges at the feet of the goddess at Pavagadh.

== Performance history ==
The play was adapted for the stage by Natmandal, an amateur theatre troupe associated with the theatre school of Gujarat Vidhya Sabha, in 1953. According to theatre scholar Hasmukh Baradi, director Jaishankar 'Sundari' combined his grounding in Bhavai with Dina Pathak's experience of watching Chinese opera to create a music and dance oriented production.

The original cast included Dina Pathak as Mena, Prabhabahen Pathak as Amthikaki, Kailash Pandya as Shahjado, and Pransukh Nayak as the Brahmin. It ran successfully for many years drawing large audience. Music composed by Rasiklal Bhojak contributed to the production's popularity. Playback singing for the character of Mena was provided by Daksha Mehta (Madiya). The production combined drama, music, dance, and folk performance traditions in an innovative theatrical format, helping bring Gujarati folklore to the modern stage. Its success extended beyond Ahmedabad, earning recognition in Surat, Mumbai, and Delhi.

In 1957, the play was staged at the Rashtrapati Bhavan during the Republic Day celebrations in Delhi. It was also staged to entertain delegates attending a UNESCO conference.

Following its initial success, Mena Gurjari was revived on several occasions. In 1960, Jashwant Thaker directed revival performances at H. K. Arts College, Ahmedabad.

== Reception ==
The play is regarded as a landmark work in Gujarati theatre and gained popularity among both scholars and general audiences.

== Adaptations ==
A Hindi adaptation was later produced by Bharat Dave under the auspices of the National School of Drama. It starred Uttara Baokar, Surekha Sikri and Anang Desai. Saroop Dhruv subsequently created a new Gujarati adaptation of the work, contributing to its continued presence in Gujarati theatre.

The popularity of the story led to its adaptations in other media. In 1975, the Gujarati film Mena Gurjari was released, directed by Dinesh Raval and starring Mallika Sarabhai in the lead role. The film was based on the same folk legend and became commercially successful.

== See also ==
- Mena Gurjari
