= Kailash Pandya =

American theatre artist

Kailash Pandya (1923 – 24 December 2007) was an Indian theatre artist and winner of several national awards in India.

== Biography ==
Pandya was born in Bhavnagar, Gujarat, India. He was active with the Indian People’s Theatre Association, Mumbai from 1943 to 1948. From 1949 to 1957, he worked with Jaishankar Bhojak (AKA Jaishankar Sundari) at Nat Mandal, Ahmedabad. In 1958 he attended the Asian Theatre Institute in Delhi (which later grew into the National School of Drama). He also learned Kathakali from Guru Vazhenkada Kunchu Nair, and Bhavai, a popular folk theatre form from Gujarat, from Guru Chimanlal Nayak.

He headed the Theatre Department of Mrinalini Sarabhai’s Darpana Academy of Performing Arts, Ahmedabad from 1959 until he died in 2007. During his career, Kailash produced a variety of Indian and Western plays by Bhasa, Nikolai Gogol, Bertolt Brecht, Rabindranath Tagore and Vijay Tendulkar. He was deeply interested in folk theatre and experimented with Bhavai in some of his productions. Kailash also worked with theatre veterans like Dina Pathak and Chandravadan Mehta. In 1983, he received the Gujarat Sangeet Natak Akademi Award and the Sangeet Natak Akademi Award in 1993 for Direction. Kailash also frequented theatre seminars and workshops in India and abroad such as the ones at the University of California, Los Angeles, California State University, Los Angeles High School for the Performing Arts, Redlands University, and Pomona College, Claremont. Pomona College invited him to direct a Sanskrit production of Mṛcchakatika in classical Natyashastra in 1994.
