= Rasiklal Parikh =

Indian writer, historian and editor (1897–1982)

- Born: 20 August 1897; Pethapur, now in Gandhinagar district, Bombay Presidency
- Died: 1 November 1982 (aged 85); Ahmedabad, Gujarat
- Education: Bachelor of Arts
- Alma mater: Fergusson College
- Occupations: Poet, playwright, literary critic, Indologist, historian, editor
- Writing career
- Pen name: Musikar, Sanjay
- Language: Gujarati
- Notable works: Sharvilak; Mena Gurjari
- Notable awards: Ranjitram Suvarna Chandrak (1942); Sahitya Akademi Award (1960); Narmad Suvarna Chandrak (1977)

Academic background
- Academic advisors: Muni Jinvijay; Sukhlal Sanghvi

Academic work
- Doctoral students: Bhogilal Sandesara; Hariprasad Shastri

Rasiklal Chhotalal Parikh (1897–1982) was a 20th-century Gujarati poet, playwright, literary critic, Indologist, historian, and editor from Gujarat, India. He was the president of Gujarat Sahitya Sabha and was appointed the president of Gujarati Sahitya Parishad in 1964. He received the Sahitya Akademi Award in 1960 for his play Sharvilak. He is also a recipient of the Ranjitram Suvarna Chandrak and the Narmad Suvarna Chandrak.

== Biography ==
Rasiklal Parikh was born on 20 August 1897 at the village of Pethapur, now in Gandhinagar district. His father, Chhotalal Lalubhai Parikh, was a lawyer in Sadra, Gandhinagar. His mother, Chanchalbahen, belonged to a stock-broker family. Chanchalben was well educated for the time, when it was unusual for Gujarati women to study. She read both Sanskrit and Gujarati. She played an important role in shaping Rasiklal's interest in literature.

Rasiklal spent his childhood in Sadra, completing his primary school education there. He shifted to Ahmedabad for further education and attended Diwan Ballubhai High School, matriculating in 1913. In the same year he married Manekbahen, who also lived in Sadra.

After his matriculation, he moved to Pune and joined Fergusson College to obtain his bachelor of arts. While at college he studied under professors such as Dr Bhune, R. D. Ranade and Prof. Patvardhan. He was influenced by Abhyankar Shastri towards Vedas and Sanskrit literature. He studied English literature, especially tragedy, under Prof. Patvardhan, and was influenced by Ibsen and other playwrights. In 1918, he completed his Bachelor of Arts in Sanskrit and English.

While studying for his Master of Arts he worked at the Bhandarkar Oriental Research Institute, where he came into close contact with Indologist and scholar Muni Jinvijay who gave him some insight into the Indology and history of Gujarat. At the same time he met Indulal Yagnik, an Indian independence activist, who inspired him to join Gujarat Vidyapith, established by Mahatma Gandhi. So he dropped out of his master's degree education to join Vidyapith. Later, he started to edit Puratatva, a quarterly journal.

Parikh died on 1 November 1982, the day of Sharad Purnima, in Ahmedabad.

== Works ==
Parikh wrote extensively in literature, poetics, philosophy, drama, poetry, history, aesthetics and criticism.

His first publication was a Gujarati translation of Kavyaprakasha by Mammata with critical notes; he co-translated with Ramnarayan V. Pathak. It was published in 1924 by Gujarat Vidyapith. During his stay in Vidyapith, he also published Vaidik Pathavali in 1927, again a translation with critical notes of some parts of the Vedas and Brahmana. In 1938 he published Hemachandra's Kavyanushasan (Vol. 1 – 2), including his account of the author's life, works and their historical background. This is considered a significant work in Gujarati historical writing as it gives a detailed historical outline from the ancient to the Solanki eras.

In 1931, he published his first play, Pahelo Kalal, which was an adaptation of a story by Tolstoy. In the same year he published another play Rupiyanu Jhad under the pseudonym Sanjay. Pahelo Class (1931) and Premnu Mulya (1950) are plays he translated from other languages. He founded a school of drama known as Natya Vidya Mandir which gave rise to the amateur theatre troupe Natmandal. His Mena Gurjari, a musical play written in Bhavai folk form, is considered a landmark in Gujarati theatre and become popular among both scholars and the public. His full-length play Sharvilak, published in 1957, is divided into five acts and is based on two different Sanskrit plays: Mrichchhakatika written by Sudraka; and Daridra Charudatta written by Bhasa. Sharvilak was translated into Hindi in 1966.

He delivered the Maharaja Sayajirao Lectures Series at M. S. University of Baroda, which was published later as Anand Mimansa (1963). His radio talks were published as Aakashabhashit in 1974. He critiqued Bhasa's Sanskrit works in Sanskrit Natak Sahitya (1980). His Purovachan ane Vivechan, published in 1965, is a collection of applied criticism. He delivered the Vidyaben Neelkanth Lectures Series on the novel Saraswatichandra in 1972; these were published as a book in 1976 as Saraswatichandrano Mahima – Eni Patrasrishtima.

He also contributed in the field of history, including Gujaratni Rajdhanio (1958), Itihas Swarup Ane Paddhati (1969) and Gujaratno Rajakiya Ane Sanskrutik Itihas (Vol. 1 to 6; with others).

Jivan Na Vaheno is a collection of short stories. Rasiklal studied Dalpatram's book on Gujarati prosody, Dalpat Pingal, while at school. Due to the close association with Ramnarayan V. Pathak, he was inspired to write poems, publishing frequently in Yugadharma magazine. His collected poems were published as Smriti.

== Awards ==
Gujarat Sahitya Sabha awarded him the Ranjitram Suvarna Chandrak in 1942. His play Sharvilak received the Sahitya Akademi Award for 1960, and another play Mena Gurjari received the Narmad Suvarna Chandrak for 1977. In 1975 the Sangeet Natak Akademi awarded its fellowship to him for his contribution in the field of drama.

== See also ==
- List of Gujarati-language writers
