= Tippani =

Tippani is a form of folk dance which originates from the Veraval and Chorwad region of Saurashtra in Gujarat, India.

== Etymology ==
Tippani is made of two long wooden sticks of about 175 cm joined by a square wooden or iron block called garbo at the lower end to make it stronger in opposite rows. It was used to press lime into the foundation of a house or floor in older times. The dance originated among laborers such as Koli community who broke the stones and leveled the ground who performed it to avoid monotony of the work.

== Dance ==
The dance was performed exclusively by women. The women holding tippani dance while beating the floor in two opposite rows accompanied by folk songs. Turi and thali (brass plate) are used to create music. Zanz, manjira, tabla, dhol and shehnai are the major musical instruments used for music. It is performed on festivals and wedding.
