= Dina Pathak =

Indian actress (1922–2002)

- Born: Dina Gandhi; 4 March 1922; Amreli, Baroda State, British Raj (now in Gujarat, India)
- Died: 11 October 2002 (aged 80); Mumbai, Maharashtra, India
- Years active: 1948–2002
- Spouse: Baldev Pathak
- Children: Supriya Pathak Kapur; Ratna Pathak Shah
- Relatives: Pathak family
- Awards: Sangeet Natak Akademi Award (1980); Government of Gujarat's Merit Award (Theatre) for (2000–2001)

Dina Pathak (née Gandhi; 4 March 1922 – 11 October 2002) was an Indian actress and director of Gujarati theatre and also a film actor. She was an activist and President of the National Federation of Indian Women (NFIW).

A doyenne of Hindi and Gujarati films as well as theatre, Dina Pathak acted in over 120 films in a career spanning over six decades. Her production Mena Gurjari in Bhavai folk theatre style, ran successfully for many years, and is now a part of its repertoire.

She is best known for her memorable roles in the Hindi films Gol Maal and Khubsoorat. She was a favourite of the Art Cinema in India where she played powerful roles in films like Koshish, Umrao Jaan, Mirch Masala and Mohan Joshi Hazir Ho!.

Her notable Gujarati films were Moti Ba, Malela Jeev and Bhavni Bhavai, while her well-known plays include Dinglegar, Doll's House, Vijan Sheni and Girish Karnad's Hayavadana, directed by Satyadev Dubey.

== Early life ==
Dina Pathak was born in Amreli, Gujarat on 4 March 1922. She was enamoured of fashion and films, and while a teenager, started acting in plays and won acclaim from critics. She attended and graduated from a college affiliated to the University of Bombay (Mumbai). Rasiklal Parikh trained her in acting while Shanti Bardhan taught her dancing.

At a young age, she joined the Indian National Theatre as an actress. She became known for her student activism, where Bhavai theatre, a folk theatre form from Gujarat, was used extensively to create awareness about the British rule, in the pre-independence era; this led to her close association with Indian People's Theatre Association (IPTA), along with her elder sister Shanta Gandhi and younger sister Tarla Mehta; while in Mumbai, she had an important hand in reviving the Gujarati theatre there, along with fellow Gujarati actors like Kailash Pandya and Damini Mehta.

== Career ==
She created quite a stir with her plays in Gujarat in the 1940s. The audience queued up to watch her play the lead in Mena Gurjari, which is still one of the most popular Bhavais along with sister Shanta Gandhi's Jasma Odhan. In 1957, when she performed Mena Gurjari in front of then-President Dr. Rajendra Prasad at the Rashtrapati Bhawan in Delhi, it became the first and the only Gujarati play to have achieved the feat so far.

Although she made her film debut with a Gujarati film, Kariyawar (1948), she returned to theatre after acting in just one film. She continued playing to packed audience in plays by Indian People's Theatre Association (IPTA) and Shanti Bardhan's Ballet troupe. Later she formed her own theatre group in Ahmedabad called "Natmandal", even today, she is remembered as a stalwart performer and a theatre activist at IPTA.

In her mid-40's, she made a comeback to films, two decades after her debut, with Basu Bhattacharya's Uski Kahani (1966), for which she won the Bengal Journalists Association Award. She made four films in the 1960s, including Hrishikesh Mukherjee's classic Satyakam (1969), Saat Hindustani (1969), starring Amitabh Bachchan in his debut role and the Merchant Ivory Productions, The Guru (1969). By the 1970s, she had become a favourite of art and commercial films alike, playing powerful motherly and grandmotherly roles. It was in these films that she became recognised as the Grand-Old-Mother of Hindi films.

Films that stand out in this era are Gulzar's Mausam (1975), for which she earned her first nomination for the Filmfare Award for Best Supporting Actress, Kinara (1977) and Kitaab (1977), and sweet comedies like Basu Chatterjee's Chitchor (1976), Gharaonda (1977) and also in an art cinema classic, Shyam Benegal's Bhumika (1977), which saw her standing tall alongside another acting legend, Smita Patil, in her career's best performance.

Just as the 1970s ended, she was seen in the comedy classic, Hrishikesh Mukherjee's Gol Maal (1979), where she essayed the role of Kamala Shrivastava, a middle-aged woman who sportingly plays mother to Amol Palekar, who went on to direct her in his 1985 film, Ankahee. The next decade began with another career-best performance, as a stern disciplinarian matriarch in Hrishikesh Mukherjee's Khoobsurat in (1980), closely followed by Bhavni Bhavai (1980). She earned two nominations for the Filmfare Award for Best Supporting Actress for her performance in the former two films. In 1980, she was also awarded the Sangeet Natak Akademi Award. During the '80s, she also appeared on the popular TV series, Malgudi Days. In 1984, she appeared in A Passage to India. She gave powerful performances in Ketan Mehta's Mirch Masala (1985), Govind Nihalani's Tamas (1986) and once again she worked with Gulzar in Ijaazat (1987).

Perhaps her career's best came in another comedy when she appeared in Deepa Mehta's Bollywood/Hollywood (2002) for which she was nominated for Canadian Screen Award for Best Supporting Actress at the 23rd Genie Awards. She was also portraying the role of Badi Maa in the cult show Khichadi (2002).

== Personal life ==
She married Baldev Pathak and had two daughters, actresses Ratna Pathak Shah (b. 1957), and Supriya Pathak Kapur (b. 1961).

== Death ==
She completed her last film, Pinjar (2003), but died before its release, of heart attack, following a prolonged illness, on 11 October 2002 in Bandra, Bombay.

== Selected filmography ==
- Kariyawar (1948) - Raju
- Uski Kahani (1966)
- The Guru (1969) - Jury member at U.P. Beauty Contest
- Saat Hindustani (1969) - Mrs. J. Nath
- Satyakam (1969) - Harbhajan's mother
- Sara Akash (1969) - Mrs. Thakur
- Holi Ayee Re (1970) - Jamuna
- Sachaa Jhutha (1970) - Insp Pradhan's Mother
- Devi (1970) - Dharam Das' Sister
- Jal Bin Machhli Nritya Bin Bijli (1971) - Rajmata
- Koshish (1972) - Durga (Aarti's Mother)
- Ranakdevi (1973) - Special Appearance
- Aap Ki Kasam (1974) - Sunita's Mother
- Avishkaar (1974)
- Charitraheen (1974)
- Mrig Trishna (1975) - Sandhya's maid
- Anari (1975)
- Chaitali (1975) - Chaitali's Aunt
- Mausam (1975) - Gangu Rani
- Sangat (1976)
- Lagaam (1976) - Bheema's mother
- Chitchor (1976) - Mrs. P. Choudhry
- Gher Gher Matina Chula (1977)
- Dream Girl (1977) - Ratnabai
- Bhumika (1977) - Mrs. Kale
- Vishwasghaat (1977) - Saroj
- Shankar Hussain (1977) - Gomti
- Paheli (1977) - Masterji's wife
- Kitaab (1977) - Babla's Mother
- Kinara (1977)
- Gharaonda (1977) - Guha's Mother
- Anurodh (1977) - Sushma Choudhary
- Aadmi Sadak Ka (1977) - Owner of Francis Hotel
- Badalte Rishtey (1978) - Mrs. Thakur
- Damaad (1978) - Mrs. Choudhary
- Bhookh (1978) - Mausi
- Nari Tu Narayani (1978)
- Chakravyuha (1978)
- Jeena Yahan (1979)
- Do Ladke Dono Kadke (1979) - Shantu (Ramu & Rani's mom)
- Gol Maal (1979) - Kamala Srivastav
- Meera (1979) - Mrs. Virendev Rathod 'Kunwarbai'
- Khandaan (1979) - Usha's mother
- Ahsaas (1979)
- Solva Sawan (1979)
- Bebus (1979)
- Khubsoorat (1980) - Nirmala Gupta
- Thodisi Bewafaii (1980) - Dr. Karuna's mom
- Humkadam (1980) - Mrs. Raghunath Gupta
- The Naxalites (1980)
- Saajan Mere Main Saajan Ki (1980)
- Bhavni Bhavai (1980) - Bhagat's wife
- Naram Garam (1981) - Bhavani's mother-in-law
- Biwi-O-Biwi (1981) - Col. Mangal Singh's mother
- Haqdaar (1981)
- Shama (1981) - Mehrunisa 'Poofi'
- Aapas Ki Baat (1981) - Mrs. Sinha
- Umrao Jaan (1981) - Husseini
- Sharada (1981) - Taradevi
- Sansani: The Sensation (1981) - Wilma Vaz
- Tumhare Bina (1982) - Nani (Seema's mom)
- Dil-E-Nadaan (1982) - Vikram's Mother
- Dil... Akhir Dil Hai (1982) - Shobha Desai
- Prem Rog (1982) - Radha's Mother-In-Law (uncredited)
- Lakshmi (1982) - Thakur-Vijay's Father
- Star (1982) - Mrs. Verma
- Yeh To Kamaal Ho Gaya (1982) - Durga Singh
- Arth (1982) - Kavita's Mother
- Vijeta (1982) - Angad's grandmother (Biji)
- Bheegi Palkein (1982) - Mrs. Acharya
- Arpan (1983) - Mrs. Verma
- Prem Tapasya (1983) - Naniji (Grandmother)
- Woh Saat Din (1983) - Savitri (Anand's Mom)
- Achha Bura (1983) - Rosy
- Sasural (1984)
- Bindiya Chamkegi (1984) - Jeevan's wife
- Asha Jyoti (1984) - Mangala
- Yaadgaar (1984) - Suresh's mom
- A Passage to India (1984) - Begum Hamidullah
- Yahan Wahan (1984) - Rajesh's Mother
- Sharara (1984)
- Rakta Bandhan (1984) - Chandan's mom
- Mohan Joshi Hazir Ho! (1984)
- Holi (1984) (uncredited)
- Meetha Zehar (1985)
- Ramkali (1985) - Ramkali's foster mom
- Balidaan (1985) - Vijay's Bua
- Sur Sangam (1985) - Kannu's Grandmother
- Jhoothi (1985) - Seema's mother
- Ankahee (1985) - Savitri Chaturvedi
- Shart (1986) - Jankibai
- Andheri Raat Mein Diya Tere Haath Mein (1986) - Mai
- Karamdaata (1986) - Govinda's mother
- Ek Chadar Maili Si (1986) - Jindhi
- Naache Mayuri (1986) - Mayuri's Grandmother
- Haathon Ki Lakeeren (1986) - Geeta's mom
- Ek Pal (1986) - Priyam's mother
- Angaaray (1986) - Vijay's mother
- Mirch Masala (1987) - Maanki, factory worker
- Raahee (1987) - Mrs. Kumar
- Ijaazat (1987)
- Mera Yaar Mera Dushman (1987) - Ashok's Mother
- Aulad (1987) - Savithri
- Anjaam khuda jaane (1988)
- Mohabbat Ke Dushman (1988) - Amijaan
- Yateem (1988) - Mrs. Yadav (uncredited)
- Tamas (1988, TV Series)
- Lathi (1988)
- Clerk (1989) - Kaushalya
- Hum Intezaar Karenge (1989) - Ravi's mother
- Kasam Jhoot Ki (1990)
- Sanam Bewafa (1991) - Fateh's Mom
- Khilaaf (1991) - Mrs. Singh
- Saudagar (1991) - Bir Singh's elder sister
- Pita (1991)
- Ghar Parivaar (1991)
- Antarnaad (1991)
- Kabhi Dhoop Kabhi Chhaon (1992)
- Yaad Rakhegi Duniya (1992) - Naina's paternal grandmother
- Aaj Ka Goonda Raaj (1992) - Grandmother
- Sunday (1993)
- Aaina (1993) - Grandmother
- Chor Aur Chaand (1993) - Dinkar's mom
- Phool (1993) - Dharamraaj's mom
- Meharbaan (1993)
- Jaagruti (1993) - Jugnu's Grandmother
- Aankhen (1993) - Grandmother
- Andaz (1994) - Dadi in Photo Frame
- Raja Babu (1994) - Bansi's Mother (uncredited)
- Eena Meena Deeka (1994) - Eena's mom
- Maidan-E-Jung (1995) - Buaji
- Zakhmi Sipahi (1995) - Shakti's Grandmother
- Sabse Bada Khiladi (1995) - Jamna's mom
- Yaraana (1995) - Durga
- Tarpan (1995) - Rammo
- Dushmani: A Violent Love Story (1995) - Buaji (Singh family)
- Yash (1996) - Daadima
- Aurat Aurat Aurat (1996) - Sita's chachi
- Mere Sapno Ki Rani (1997) - Rajnath's mom
- Pardes (1997) - Dadi Maa
- Zor: Never Underestimate the Force (1998) - Mrs. Singh
- Gharwali Baharwali (1998) - Dadi Maa
- Zulm-O-Sitam (1998) - Meena's Grandfather
- Himmatwala (1998)
- Silsila Hai Pyar Ka (1999) - Abhay's Grandmother
- Kartoos (1999) - Mini's Buaji
- Pyaar Koi Khel Nahin (1999)
- Badal (2000) - old lady
- Raja Ko Rani Se Pyar Ho Gaya (2000) - Dodima
- Champion (2000) - Rajveer's Grandmother
- Aashiq (2001) - Dai Maa
- Tum Bin (2001) - Mrs. Shah
- Lajja (2001) - Bua
- Devdas (2002) - Badima
- Bollywood/Hollywood (2002) - Grandma ji
- Mere Yaar Ki Shaadi Hai (2002)
- Border Hindustan Ka (2003) - 'Dadi' - Nargis' grandmother
- Pinjar (2003) - Rashid's aunt (final film role)

== Television ==
Year!	Serial	Role	Channel	Notes
1987	Malgudi Days	Aaya (Main Role)	Doordarshan	Only Episode no 41
1994	Tehkikaat	Kanchan Chaudhry	DD National	Jealously Turns Blood Episode 1 to 3
1994	Junoon	Savitri Dhanraj	DD National	Only from Episode 1 to 7
1999	Ek Mahal Ho Sapno Ka	Dadi	Sony Entertainment Television	
2002	Khichdi	Diwaliben Parekh aka Badi Maa	Star Plus	

== Awards ==
- 1977 – Nominated – Filmfare Award for Best Supporting Actress for Mausam
- 1980 – Nominated – Filmfare Award for Best Supporting Actress for Gol Maal
- 1981 – Nominated – Filmfare Award for Best Supporting Actress for Khubsoorat
- 2003 – Nominated – Canadian Screen Award for Best Supporting Actress for Bollywood/Hollywood
