= Bhavai =

Folk theatre form of western India

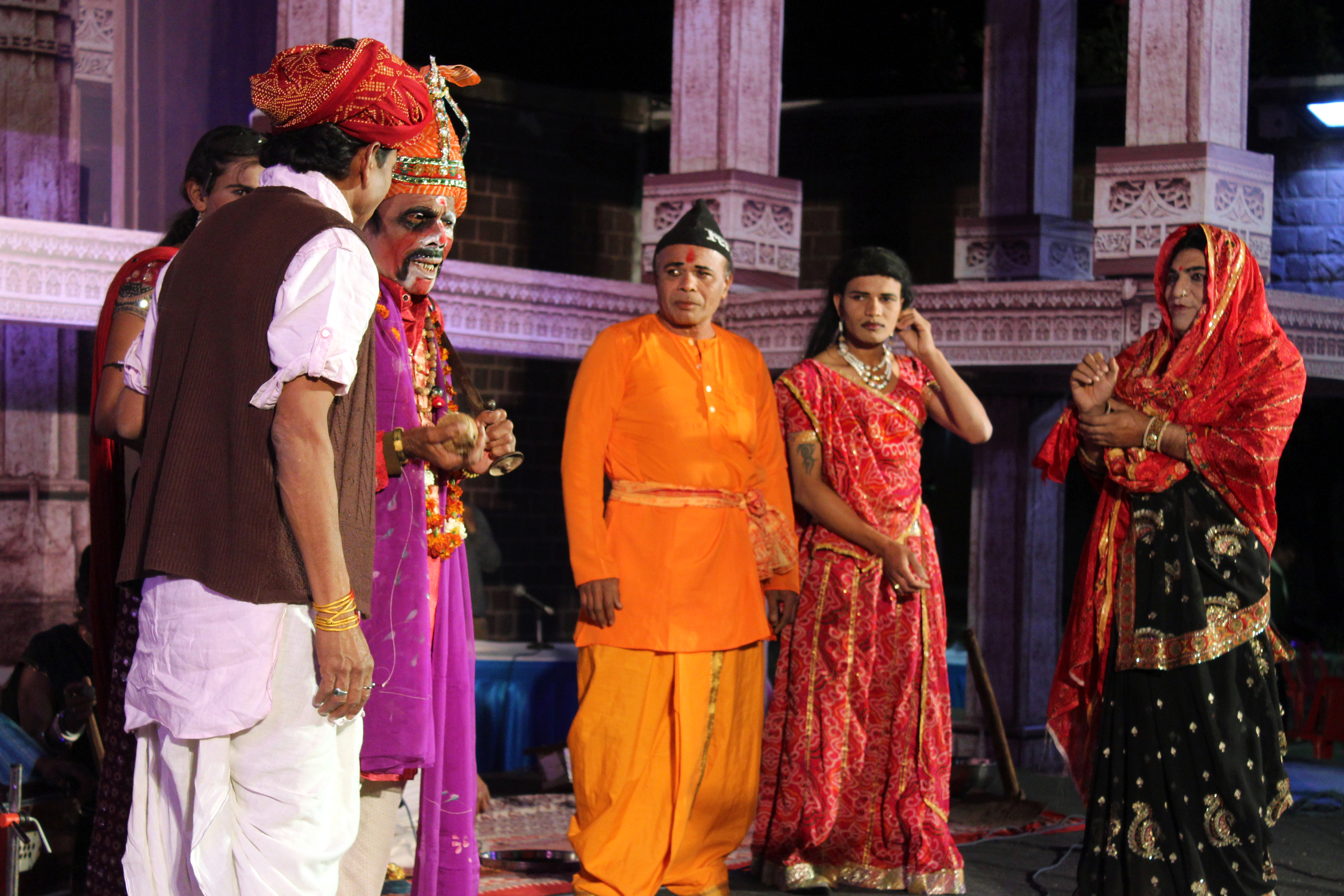
Bhavai performance at Bharat Bhavan, Bhopal

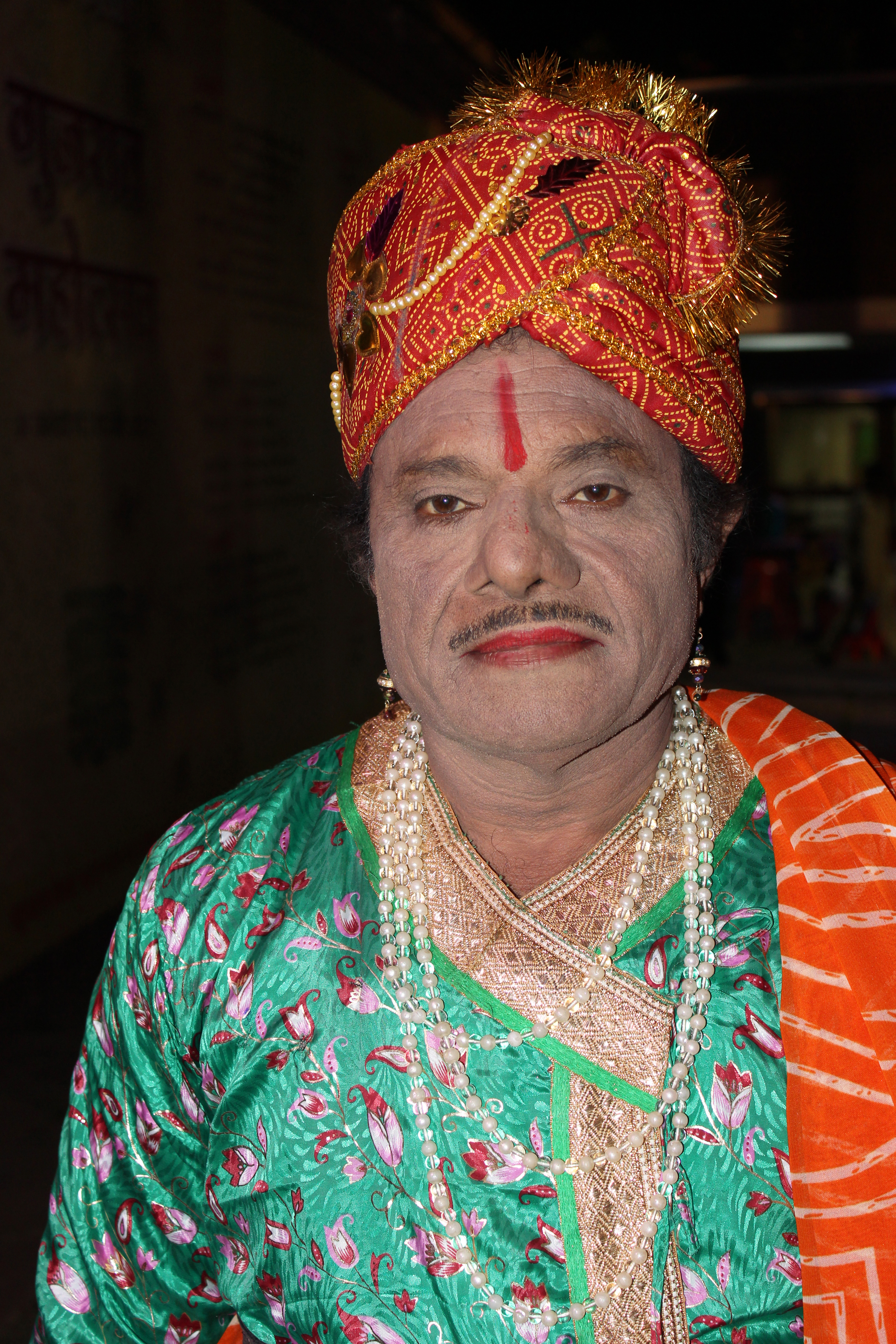
Bhavai artist

Bhavai, also known as Vesha or Swang, is a popular folk theatre form of western India, especially in Gujarat.

== Etymology ==
Bhavai may derive from the Sanskrit word Bhava, meaning expression or emotion. It is also associated with Hindu goddess Amba. Bhav means universe and Aai means mother, so it may be also considered an art form dedicated to the Mother of the Universe, Amba. Bhavai is also known as Vesha or Swang, which literally means 'get-up'.

== History ==
Bhavai is believed to have originated in the 14th century. Asaita Thakar is traditionally credited for its origin.

=== Folklore ===
In the 14th century, Ganga, daughter of Unjha headman Hema Patel, was kidnapped by Muslim subedar. Their family priest, Asaita Thakar, who was a brahmin, went to subedar claiming Ganga as his daughter. To prove this, subedar asked him to dine with Ganga as during those time, Brahmins did not dine with lower castes. He dined with her to save her, but upon return, he was outcaste by the Brahmins. He started performing plays to earn his living, which developed into specific dramatic form. Out of gratitude, Hema Patel also gave him a plot of land and financial support, which mark the start of patronage of Bhavaiya, the performers of Bhavai, by villages.

It is believed that Asaita Thakar wrote about 360 plays or Vesha (lit. dress) but only 60 have survived including some with his own names. In one of his plays, Asaita had dated his composition as AD 1360.

Bhavai performance appear clearly to have evolved from earlier forms of folk entertainment. It may have originated from medieval Sanskrit uparupaka (forms) which were performed in open. The word Bhavai in the sense of show or spectacle occurs in the 13th century Apabhramsa Jain religious verse. It says: "In a tree-less tract even a bunch of eranda (caster oil plant) makes a good show (Bhavai)." Abul Fazal’s Ain-e-Akbari also mentions Bhavai while mentioning some communities.

The Bhavai performers belong to a caste that came to be known as Taragala or "Bhavaiyya" (termed Nayak in Mehsana area, Bhojak in Kutch, and Vyas in Saurashtra).

== Overview ==
Bhavai is partly entertainment and partly a ritual offering made to Goddess Amba. It is performed in open spaces in front of the temple. In the courtyard of the Ambaji temple near Mount Abu the Navratri festival is celebrated with Bhavai performances. Amba is the presiding deity of Bhavai.

Subtle social criticism laced with pungent humour is the speciality of Bhavai. The pompous and incongrous behaviour of high caste people is scoffed at in Bhavai. Probably the anger over injustice suffered by the originator of Bhavai, Asaita Thakar, permeated the art of Bhavai. Some of the Bhavai plays present a scathing review of the caste-ridden social structure. People belonging to different levels of social strata ranging from king to knave are portrayed in Bhavai.

== Bhavai plays ==
Bhavai Veshas portray people from all classes of society. The barbers and knife-sharpeners, robbers, bangle sellers and social and economic thieves, banjaras, odas, darjis, fakirs and sadhus. There is a Vesha depicting the story of an unsuccessful love affair of a Bania woman and a Muslim Thanedar. At the end of the play Jasma Odan, a Muslim fakir appears to whom people request to revive Jasma.

Humor plays a vital part in any Bhavai performance and comes into play even while dealing with mythological personages. This predominance makes Bhavai unique among the traditional arts of India.

The chief of the Bhavai troupe is called the Nayak. He first marks the performing arena, then offers kumkum to the oil-torch or earthen lamp which is a symbol of goddess Amba and sings prayer songs in her praise. Then enters an actor covering his face with a plate, he is Lord Ganesha, the remover of obstacles. Goddess Kali is the next to enter and after she departs comes the Brahmana. The Vesha actually starts only after these preliminary appearances.

The Nayak and the jester always remain on stage and direct the course of action with their commentary and intervention. The story unfolds through songs, dialogues and speeches in prose as well as verse. There is lot of dancing and singing in Bhavai. Female characters are acted by men.

The language of Bhavai is a blend of Hindi, Urdu, and Marwari. Veshas were published for the first time in the nineteenth century and performances were linked to their predecessors through practice and the oral tradition.

The Bhungal is a four feet long copper pipe that provides a strong note and is unique to Bhavai. The bhungals are played during dance sequences and otherwise to indicate important characters. Other musical instruments that Bhavai performances include the pakhawaj (drums), jhanjha (cymbals), the sarangi (a stringed instrument), and the harmonium. The style of music is always Hindustani music interspersed with local tunes.

Bhavai is also prevalent in Rajasthan as a folk dance called Bhavai dance.

== Contemporary performances ==
Muljibhai Nayak, Pransukh Nayak, and Chimanlal Naik are some well known Bhavai performers of 20th century. With advent of cinema and television, the entertainment in village changed radically and the popularity of Bhavai declined and is decaying. The modern Gujarati theatre people tried to revive it with new plays but no coordinated effort is carried out.

Jasma Odan based on Gujarati folk tale, written and directed by Shanta Gandhi; Rasiklal Parikh's Mena Gurjari (Mena of Gujarat, 1953) produced by Deena Gandhi and C. C. Mehta's Hololika (1956) were some of the most popular Bhavai musicals of modern times.

Ghanashyam Nayak, a famous actor, known for the role of Nattu Kaka in the show Taarak Mehta Ka Ooltah Chashmah was also from Bhavai theatre. He acted in more than 350 films and television shows.

== Gallery ==
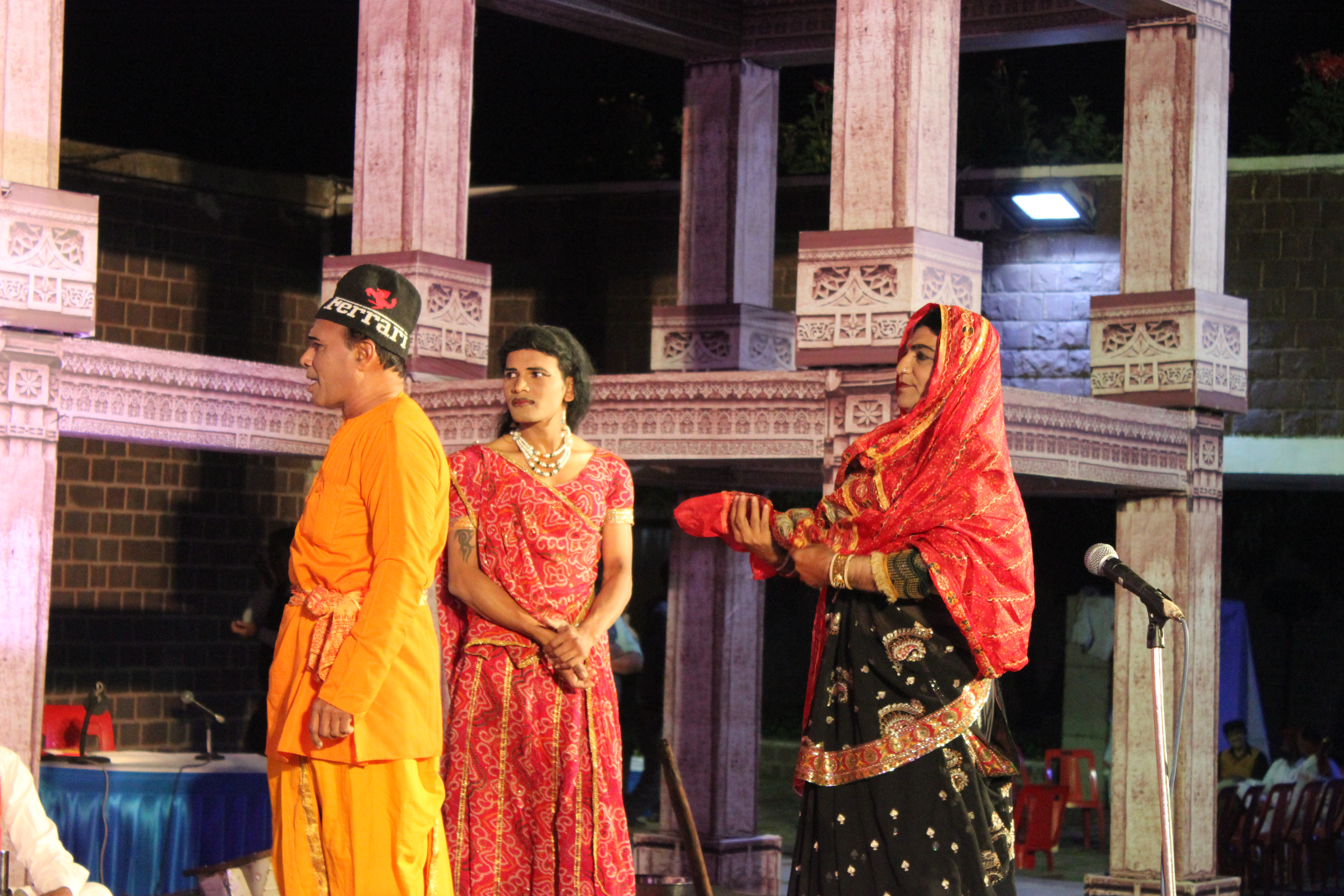

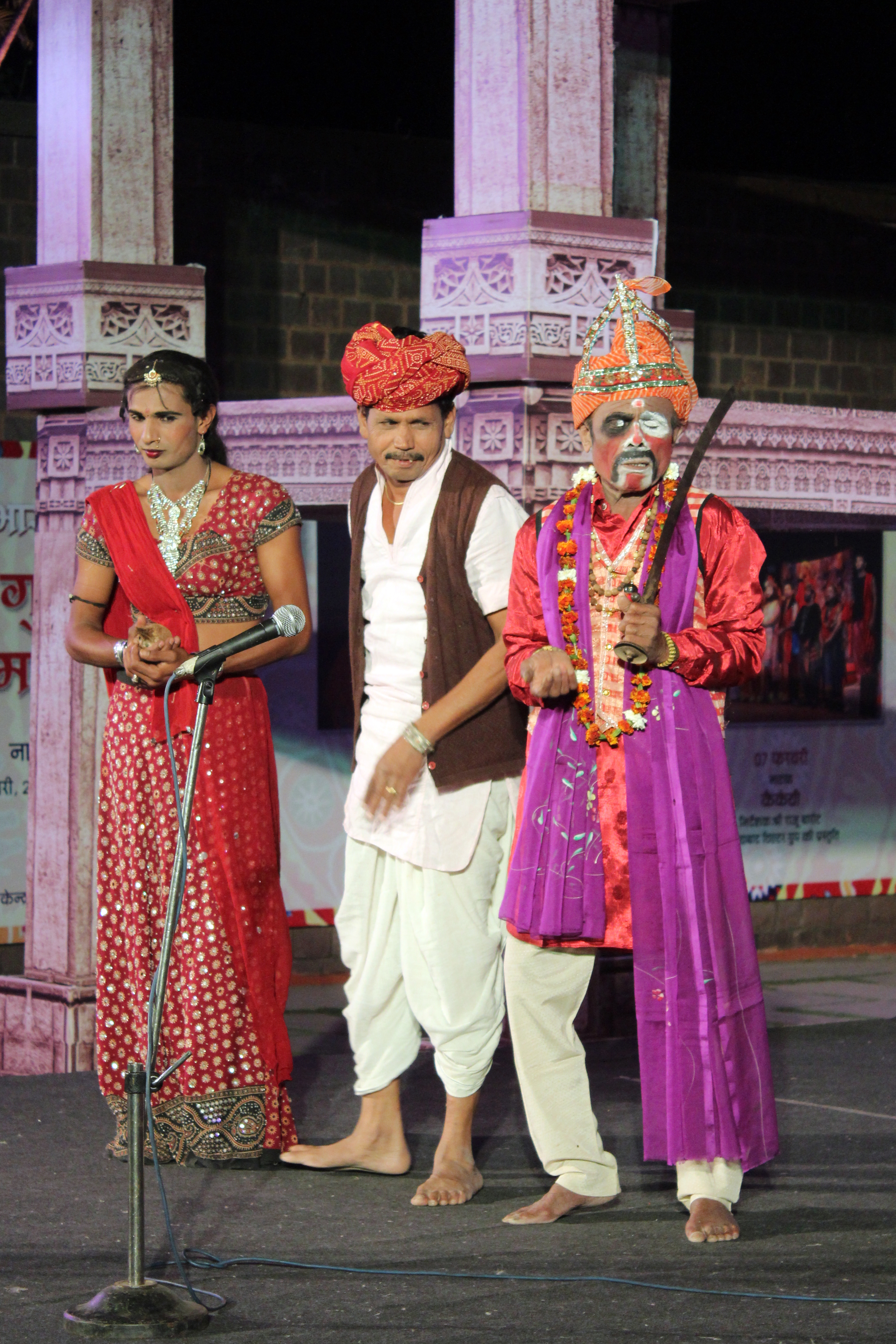
Scenes of Bhavai

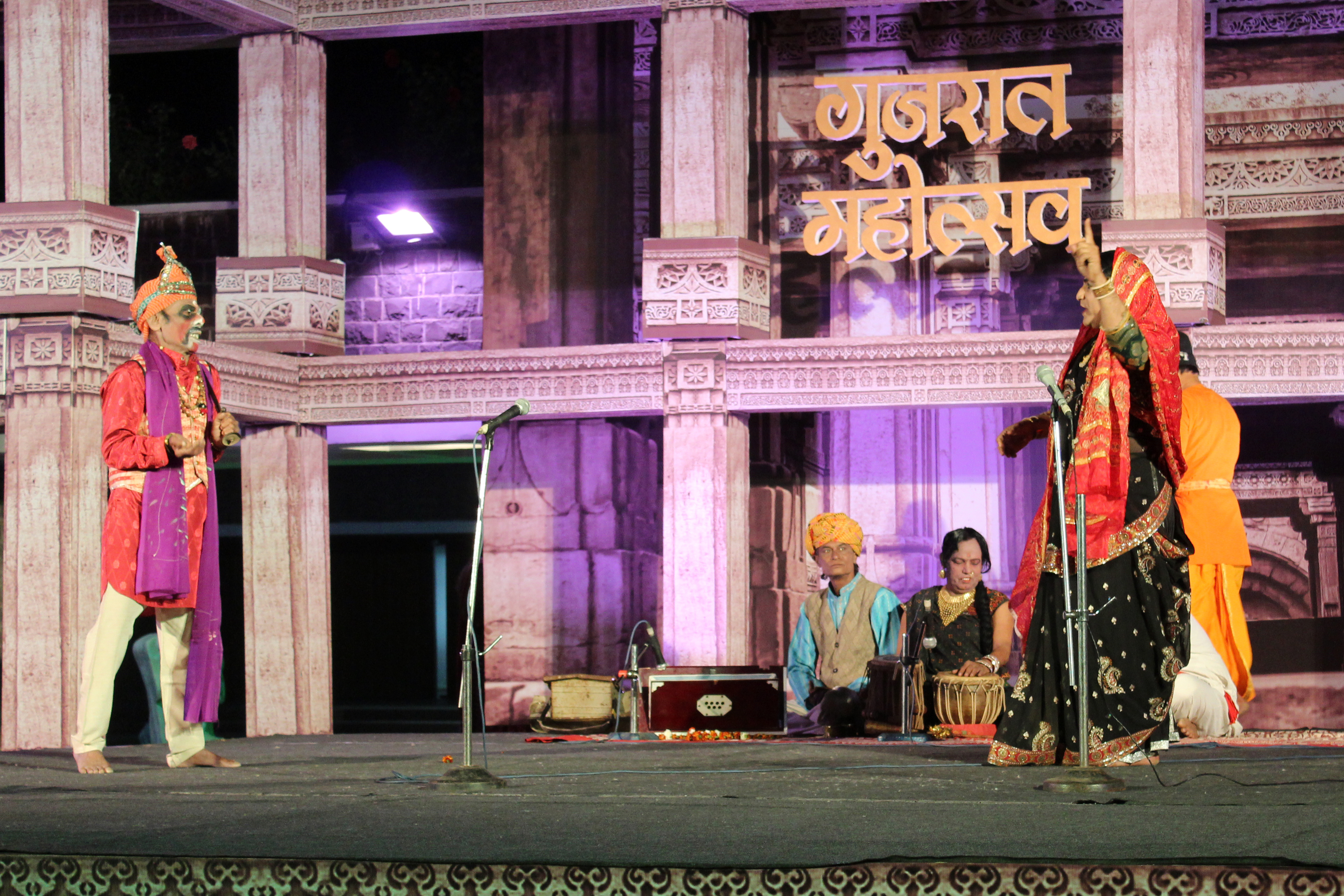

== See also ==
- List of traditional Indian theatre
- Theatre of India
- Culture of Gujarat
- Culture of India
