= Dalpatram =

Gujarati Poet

Dalpatram Dahyabhai Travadi CIE
- દલપતરામ ડાહ્યાભાઈ ત્રવાડી
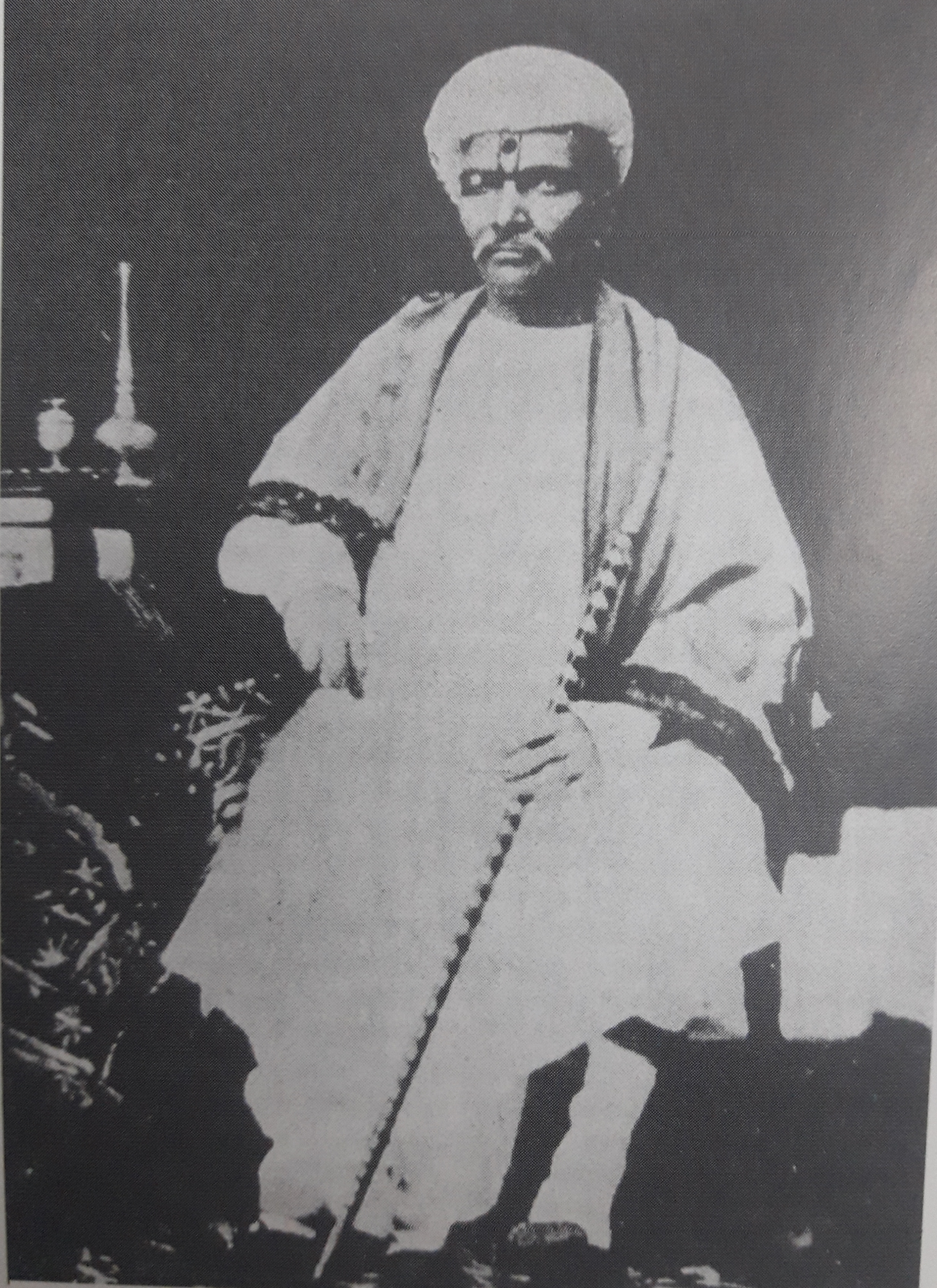
- Born: 21 January 1820; Wadhwan, Surendranagar, Gujarat, Gaekwad state of Baroda
- Died: 25 March 1898 (aged 78); Ahmedabad, Bombay presidency, British India
- Occupations: poet, editor
- Children: Nanalal Dalpatram Kavi (son)
- Writing career
- Language: Gujarati
- Notable work: Mithyabhiman (1870)

Dalpatram Dahyabhai Travadi CIE (21 January 1820 – 25 March 1898) was a Gujarati language poet during 19th century in India. He was the father of poet Nanalal Dalpatram Kavi.

He led social reform movements in Ahmedabad, and wrote articles against superstitions, caste restrictions and child marriage. He dealt with the problem of widow remarriage at length in his poem, Vencharitra.

== Biography ==
Dalpatram was born on 21 January 1820 in Wadhwan, Surendranagar District, in a Shrimali Brahmin family. His father's name is Dahyabhai. Dalpatram grew up to the resonant chanting of 'mantras' and recitations of religious scriptures. He was a child prodigy and displayed his extraordinary literary skills by composing hondulas at the age of 12. He mastered the structures of rhyme, poesis and 'Vrajbhasha' as a Swaminarayan devotee under Brahmanand Swami, and later moved to Ahmedabad at the age of 24. In 1885, Dalpatram was made a Companion of the Most Eminent Order of the Indian Empire (CIE).

Dalpatram died on 25 March 1898 at Ahmedabad.

== Career ==
Dalpatram was a Sanskrit scholar and poet. Dalpatram taught Gujarati language to Alexander Kinloch Forbes, a British colonial administrator to Ahmedabad. Gujarati was considered at the bottom of language hierarchy during those times, so he preferred to write his poems in Brajbhasha instead of Gujarati, his mothertongue. Forbes encouraged him to write in Gujarati. Forbes and Dalpatram became close friends, and he inspired Dalpatram to write Laxmi Natak published in 1849, the first modern play in Gujarati, based on Greek drama Plutus.

Forbes, who wanted Gujarati literature to develop, had helped start the Gujarat Vernacular Society. He served as its first assistant secretary and started the Buddhiprakash periodical in 1850, editing it until 1878. When Forbes died in 1865, Dalpatram composed Farbesvirah, a Gujarati elegy, and Farbesvilas, his account of the gathering of bards, both dedicated to him. At the end of the 19th century, he was entitled Mahakavi (Great Poet) by Sahajanand Swami, the founder of Swaminarayan Sampraday.

Unlike Narmad, another prominent Gujarati poet of the same period, Dalpatram supported British rule for the benefits it gave India. Dalpatram also supported social reforms such as opposition to child marriage and allowing widows to remarry. Both Dalpatram and Narmad were the first Gujarati poets to address subjects connected to common life in their verses. Dalpatram's poems had subjects like English law, how to write an essay, and even "trees in a college compound". His verse often reflected his sense of humour.

Dalpatram was an authority on meters and wrote a treatise, Pingal ("Prosody"), which was used by scholars as a source book for many decades.

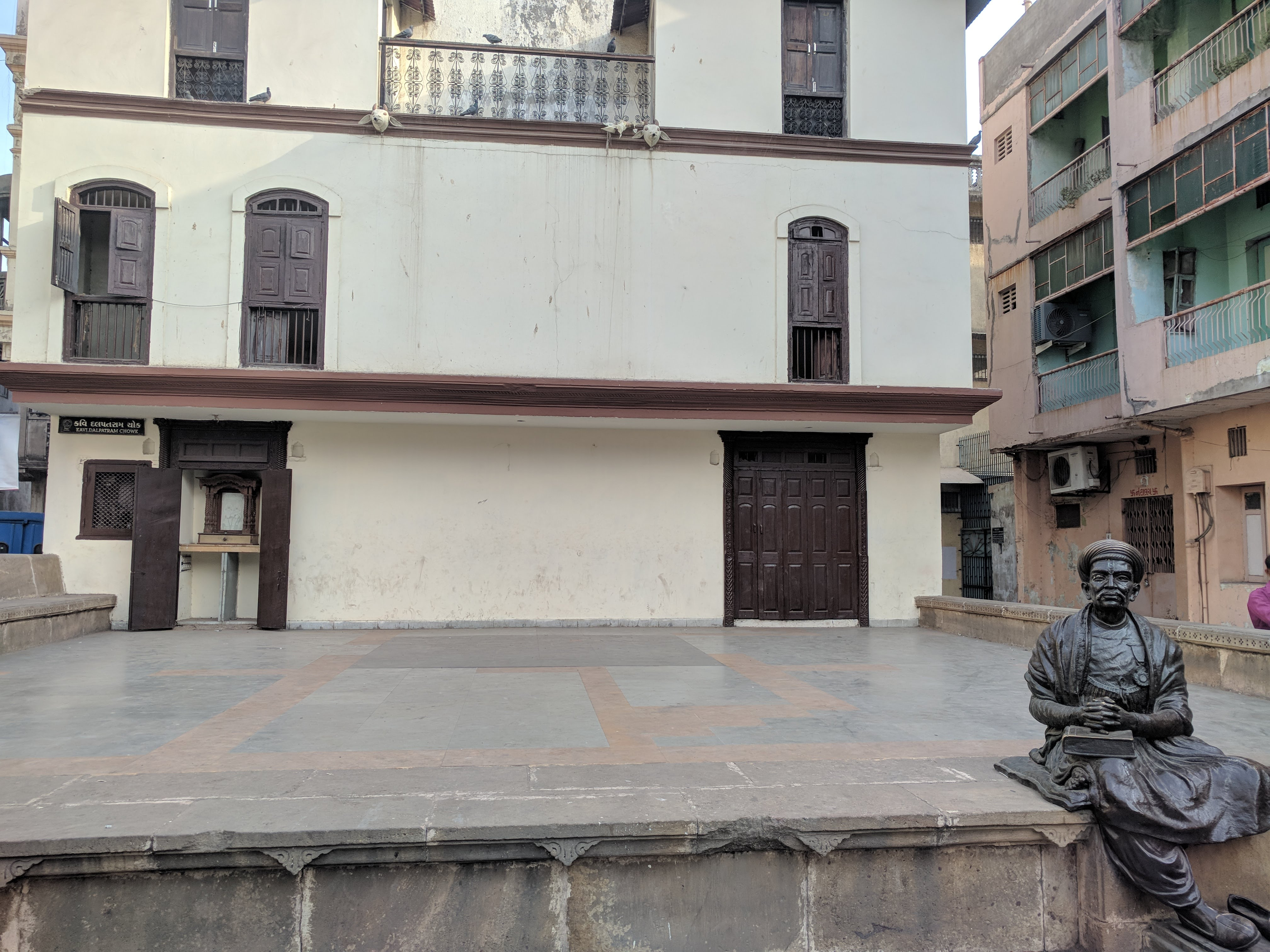
Poet Dalpatram Chowk

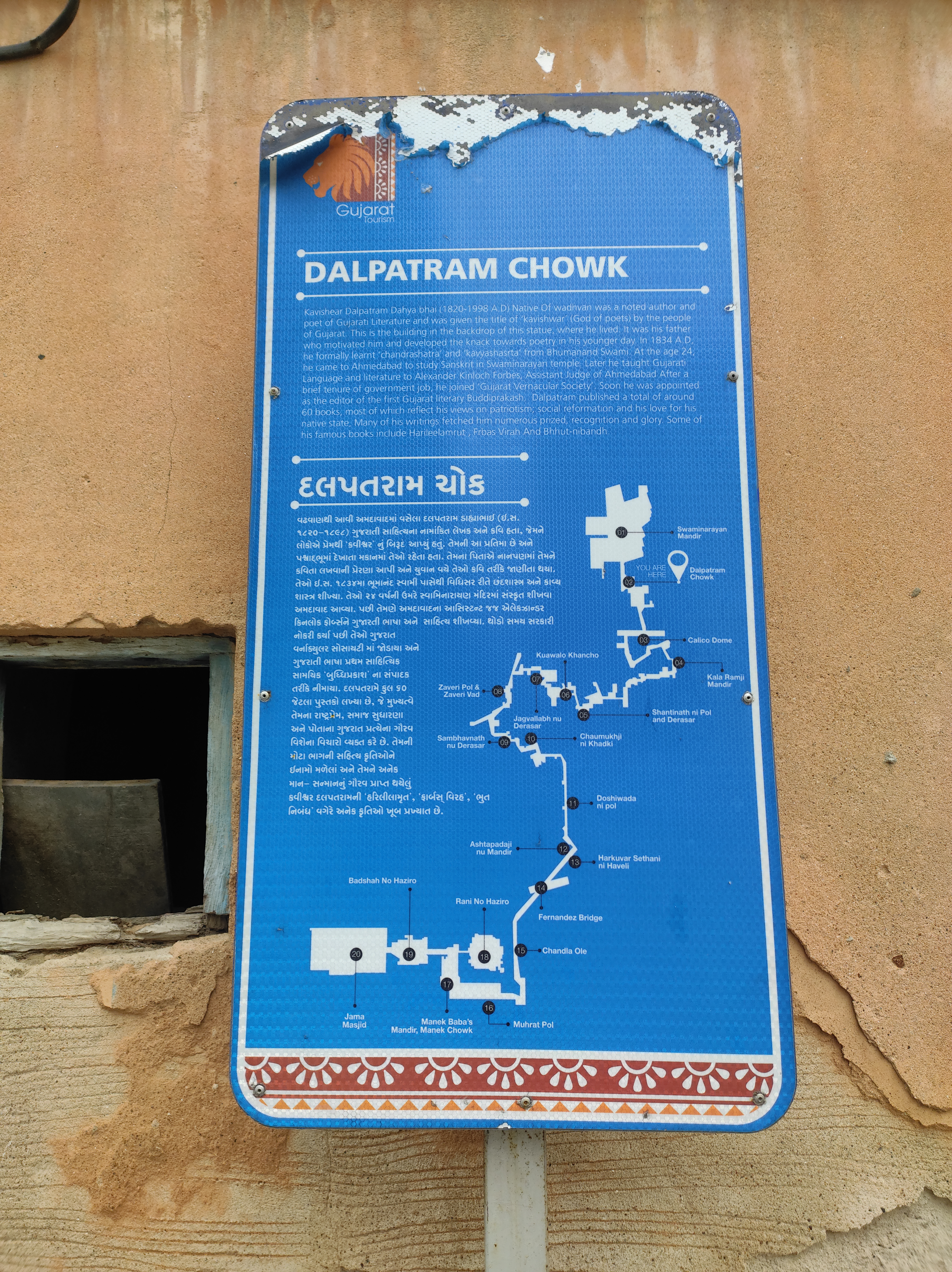
Plaque at Dalpatram Chowk

== Statue and Memorial ==
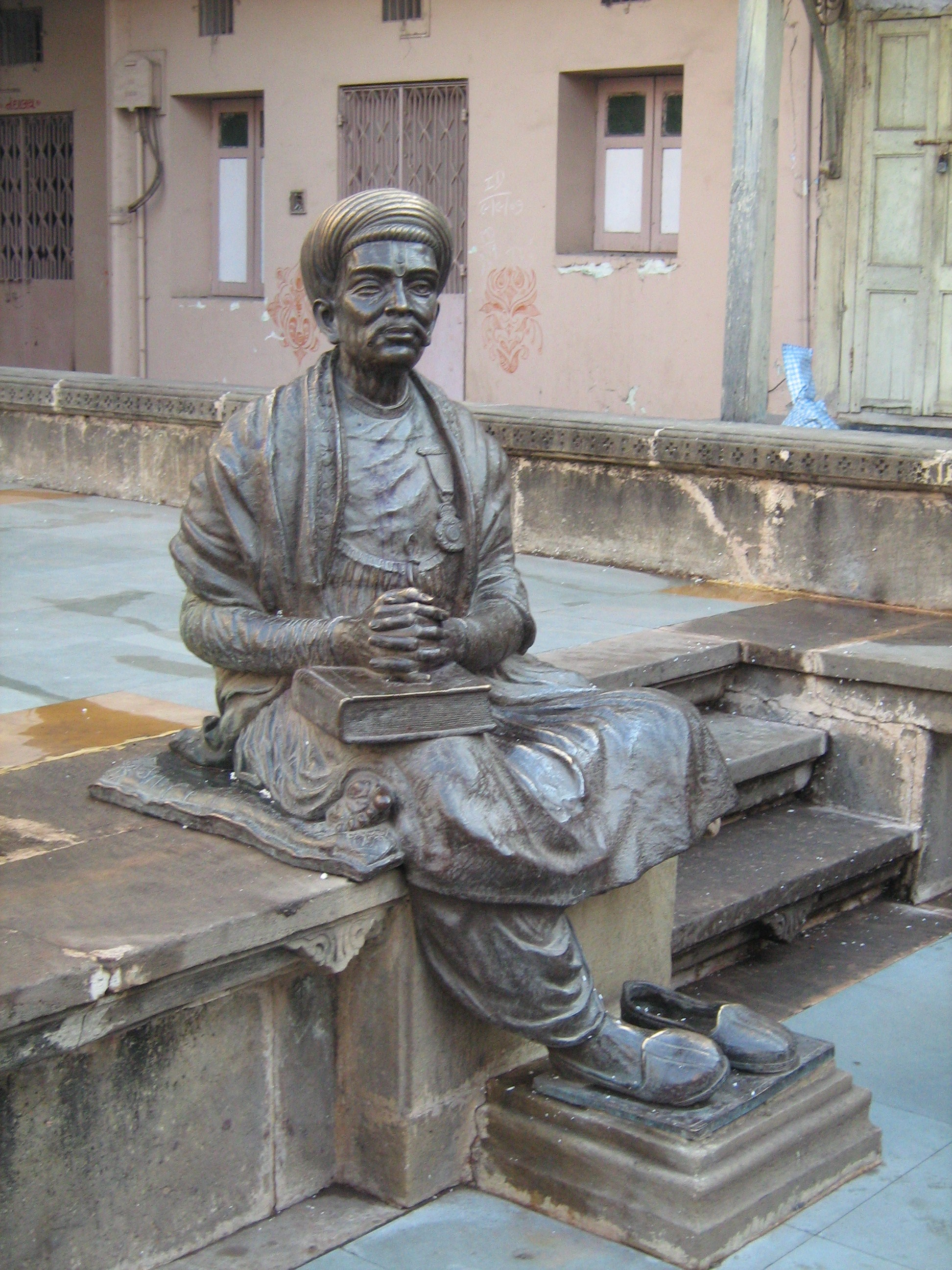
Statue of Dalpatram at Lambeshwar ni Pol, Ahmedabad

In tribute to Dalpatram's work, AMC and citizens of Ahmedabad proposed a memorial at the site of his house, which was destroyed in 1985. With very few references or photographs available, it was very difficult to recreate the house. References were taken from the memories of residents and the architectural design of surrounding houses to create a memorial in the form of facade of the house and statue of Kavi Dalpatram in 2001.

In 2001, the memorial became a part of Heritage walk of Ahmedabad. The design of statue was debated before they came up with the idea of Kavi in sitting posture with a book in his lap.

The statue is made of bronze and weighs 120 kg.

The platform behind the statue displays the plan of the original house. The yellow stone on the floor indicates the walls, grey stone indicates the rooms and the black stone represents the open courtyard. The staircase is also marked with yellow stone.

The memorial also serves as a platform for community gatherings. His plays and recitations are also enthusiastically performed on various occasions including his birthday. The Heritage department has taken the responsibility of maintenance of the Dalpatram Memorial.

== Contest with Narmad ==
Just at the time when Narmad was emerging into celebrity (1859), Dalpatram who had already won his laurels, happened to visit Bombay for treatment of his eyes. Lovers of Gujarati poetry, they met together, and in the poetical contest that took place, naturally they warmed up and their audience took sides as to who was the better poet. The result was a lifelong estrangement between the two. The contest was continued in the public papers and a humorous paper. The Parsi Punch, a weekly, published a cartoon, in which they were represented as fighting each other with the top-knot of the hair of their heads in their hands.

== Legacy ==
He was a progressive thinker and advocated the upliftment of oppressed classes and women's empowerment. He used his literary skills to bring about changes in society.

The Kavishwar Dalpatram Award is named after him.

== Works ==
His career spanned 6 books and 25 awards including drama, poems, songs, essays and articles. Hari Lila Amrut, Ven Charitra, Mithyabhiman and Laxmi are his major contributions.

- Laxmi (play)
- Shrey (play)
- Bapani Pinpar (poetry)
- Mithyabhiman (play)
- Farbesvirah (elegy)
- Farbesvilas (poetry)

== See also ==
- Gujarati literature
- List of Gujarati-language writers
