= List of traditional Indian theatre =

Kutiyattam is the only surviving specimen of the ancient Sanskrit theatre, thought to have originated around the beginning of the Common Era, and is officially recognised by UNESCO as a Masterpiece of the Oral and Intangible Heritage of Humanity. In addition, many forms of Indian folk theatre abound. They are listed below.

Theatre	State/Region	Originated	Features	Exponents
Akhyana	Gujarat		Enactment of religious episodes from Ramayana, Mahabharata and Bhagavata by Mana-bhatas	Premanand Bhatt, Narsinh Mehta, Acharya Hemachandra
Ankia Naat	Assam		Written in an artificial old medieval period poetic Assamese and Maithili mixed language called Brajavali and are primarily centered on Krishna, which usually combine live instruments and singers, dance and elaborate costumes in production	
Bayalata	Karnataka			
Bhand pather	Kashmir		it consists of unique combinations of dance, drama and acting	
Bhaona	Assam			
Bhavai	Gujarat			
Burrakatha	Andhra Pradesh			
Chhau	Jharkhand, West Bengal & Orissa			
Dashavatar	Maharashtra and Goa			
Harikatha	Southern India			
Hela Khayal Dangal	Rajasthan			
Jatra	West Bengal			
Kalaripayattu	Kerala			
Kathakali	Kerala			
Marathi Keertan	Maharashtra			
Kathakatha	West Bengal			
Kudiyattam	Kerala			
Maach	Madhya Pradesh			
Naqal	Punjab			
Manipuri Sankirtana	Manipur			
Nautanki	Uttar Pradesh			
Odissi	Orissa			
Ojapali	Assam			
Padayani	Kerala			
Pala	Orissa			
Pandavani	Madhya Pradesh			
Powada	Maharashtra			
Raas Leela (Raas Mahotsav)	Assam			
Ramlila	Northern India			
Raslila	North East India			
Rabana Chhaya	Orissa		Shadow puppetry	
Swang	Rajasthan			
Swang	Uttar Pradesh			
Tamasha	Maharashtra			
Tang-ta	Manipur			
Terukkuttu	Tamil Nadu			
Theyyam	Kerala			
Tholpavakoothu	Kerala			
Tiatr	Goa			
Wari-leeba	Manipur			
Yakshagana	Karnataka			
