= Bhalchandra Pandharinath Bahirat =

Indian educationist

- Bhalchandra Pandharinath Bahirat
- Born: 5 September 1904; Pandharpur, Maharashtra
- Died: 14 October 1998 (aged 94); Pandharpur, Maharashtra
- Other names: Dr. Hari Bhakta Parayan Baburao Bahirat
- Education: Bachelor of Arts with Philosophy from Fergusson College, Pune, Maharashtra; Master of Arts with Philosophy from University of Mumbai, Mumbai, Maharashtra; Honorary Doctor of Letters, Pune University, Pune, Maharashtra;
- Known for: Philosopher, Educationist, Literature of Jñāneśvar

Bhalchandra Pandharinath Bahirat, 5 September 1904 – 14 October 1998) was a philosopher and educationist who studied the Marathi literature of Jñāneśvar and other sants of Maharashtra. He was awarded an honorary Doctor of Letters from Pune University in 1991.

== Lifework summary ==
Several books written by Bhalchandra Pandharinath Bahirat such as The Philosophy of Jnanadeva, Amritanubhava, The philosophy of Jnanadeva as gleaned from the Amrtanubhava and The Philosophy of Jnanadeva are referenced by students, scholars and common people studying saint literature. Apart from Hindu philosophy, he also studied western philosophy and its social and economic impact on communities. His work on The Philosophy of Jnanadeva was presented in 20th World Congress of Philosophy, 1998.

He was affiliated to educational as well as musical institutions and gave lectures in number of colleges, at common gatherings on philosophy and saint culture of Maharashtra. Number of universities appointed him as an examiner for PhD students. He expressed philosophical views as an editor of Marathi magazine Prembodh (Devagarnai:प्रेमबॊध) for eighteen years from 1936 to 1954 which are referenced by international books, such as Who Invented Hinduism: Essays on Religion in History, By David N. Lorenzen. Along with Vinayak Damodar Savarkar, he promoted liberalism of Vithoba Temple, Pandharpur to allow access for common people through conferences and his writings in local news paper Pandhari Sandesh published in 1939. He was the president of Maharashtra State Vishwa Hindu Parishad, Pandharpur Research Society and Saint Wangmay Mandal.

He donated his stature literature on saints, personal library of more than 2500 books to Pune University and The Bhandarkar Oriental Research Institute, Pune. This collection included some of the original manuscripts of the Jñānēśvarī and abhangs by Tukaram.

== Early life ==
After graduating in philosophy from Fergusson College, Pune, he submitted a thesis on The Philosophy of Amritanubhave to Bombay University towards receiving MA degree under guidance of Sonopant V. Dandekar and Gurudev Rambhau Ranade. The University of Pune conferred on him honorary degree of D. Litt. in 1991.

He was a member of Varkari culture of Pandharpur, Maharashtra, as a Varkari for Alandi giving religious discourses and Kirtans. His association with Varkari Sampradaya was inspired by Dada Maharaj Satarkar (Bappa). After receiving fellowship from Dada Maharaj Satarkar, he continued this work for 40 years by participating in Pandharpur – Aalandi Vari * (Pressession by walk) Kirtan and Pravachan at various places on Varkari Sampradaya on regular basis.

== Dharmarth Maharashtra Sangeet Vidyalaya, Pandharpur ==
Bhalchandra Pandharinath Bahirat served as treasurer (Devagarnai:कोषाध्यक्ष) of Maharashtra Sangeet Vidyalaya (Devagarnai: महाराष्ट्र संगीत विद्यलय); music school where he was associated with Shanta Apte, Hirabai Barodekar, Mogubai Kurdikar, Panditrao Nagarkar and many other Indian classical music legends of the time. Most of them performed classical music programs at his home due to his appreciation and interest towards classical music. Pandit Jagannath Bua Pandharpurkar, Pandit Dattopant Mangalvedhekar, Baburao Manjul, Pandit Narayanrao Mangalvedhekar, Pandit Shankarappa Mangalvedhekar are some of the people who worked along with Bhalchandra Pandharinath Bahirat to establish Maharashtra Sangeet Vidyalaya as a pioneering music academy.

== Birth century celebration ==
During 4 to 10 Sep 2004, University of Pune arranged birth century celebration of Bhalchandra Pandharinath Bahirat. This included talks towards Varkari Calcture of Pandharpur and saint literature of Maharashtra. Discussion called "Amrutache Antrang" (Devagarnai: अमृताचॆ अंतरंग) was led by Prof. Madhav Pendse, inaugurated by Prof. Dilip Chitre and included contributions from Dr. Sadanand More, Prof. Gauri More and Prof Sonopant Dandekar.

== Accolades ==
- 1991 – Awarded Doctor of Letters (D. Litt.) by Pune University
- 1991 – Award from Government of Maharashtra for his work during a ceremony at Paithan, Maharashtra
- 1997 – Sant Dnyaneshwar Puraskar, Dnyaneshwar Sanskritik Pratisthan, Newasa
- 1998 – Maharashtra Gaurav Puraskar, from Government of Maharashtra at Mumbai
- 1998 – Honored at Maharashtra Rajya Sahitya ani Sanskruti Mandal, (Devagarnai: महाराष्ट्र राज्य साहित्य आणि संस्कृती मंडळ), Mumbai by prevailing president Dattaram Maruti Mirasdar

== Career or posts held ==
- President – Pandharpur Sanshodhan Sanstha, Pandharpur, India
- President – Pandharpur Sant Vandmay Mandal, Pandharpur, India
- Founder – Dharmartha Maharashtra Sangeet Mahavidyalay
- President – Maharashtra State Vishwa Hindu Parishad (Devagarnai: विश्व हिन्दू परिषद)
- Evaluator for PhDThesis submitted to Pune, Mumbai, Nagpur and Shivaji Universities
- Treasurer – Maharashtra Sangeet Vidyalaya, Pandharpur, India

== Books written ==
- Philosophy of Jnanadeva (1954) - ISBN 978-8120815742
- The philosophy of Jnanadeva as gleaned from the Amrtanubhava (1998) - ISBN 978-9359710662
- The Philosophy of Jnanadeva, 2nd edition (5 February 1998)
- Jnanadeva: The Life and Works of Jnanadeva (Saint Heritage of India) (2006)
- Varkari Sampraday: Uday va Vikas (1988)

== Edited works ==
- Sakal Sant Gatha
- Muktshwara's Ovi Ramayan
- Rashtra-Bhashya on Amritanubhava by Hariharendra Swami
- Jyotsna Tika of Amritanubhava by Shri Bhaiyyakaka Kibe

== Marathi writings ==
- Sant Vanicha Amrit Kalash
- Bhakticha Kalpvruksha
- Nathancha Prasad
- Varakari Sampradaya Uday and Vikas
- Bhakti Sadhana

== Thesis ==
- Sakalsantagatha (1952)
- Mukteshwarkrit Ovi Ramayan: (1952) 3 Editions
- Amrutanubhav – Rashtrabhashya (1952)
- Santavanicha Amrutkalash (1955)
- Bhaktimarg Deepika (1958)
- Bhakticha Kalpavruksha (1956)
- Nathancha Prasad (1957)
- Varkari Sampraday : Udaya ani Vikas (1972), (1988)
- Bhakti Sadhana (1981)
- Amrutanubhav – Jyotsna Tika (1996)
