= The Buddha in Hinduism =

Buddha
- Member of Dashavatara
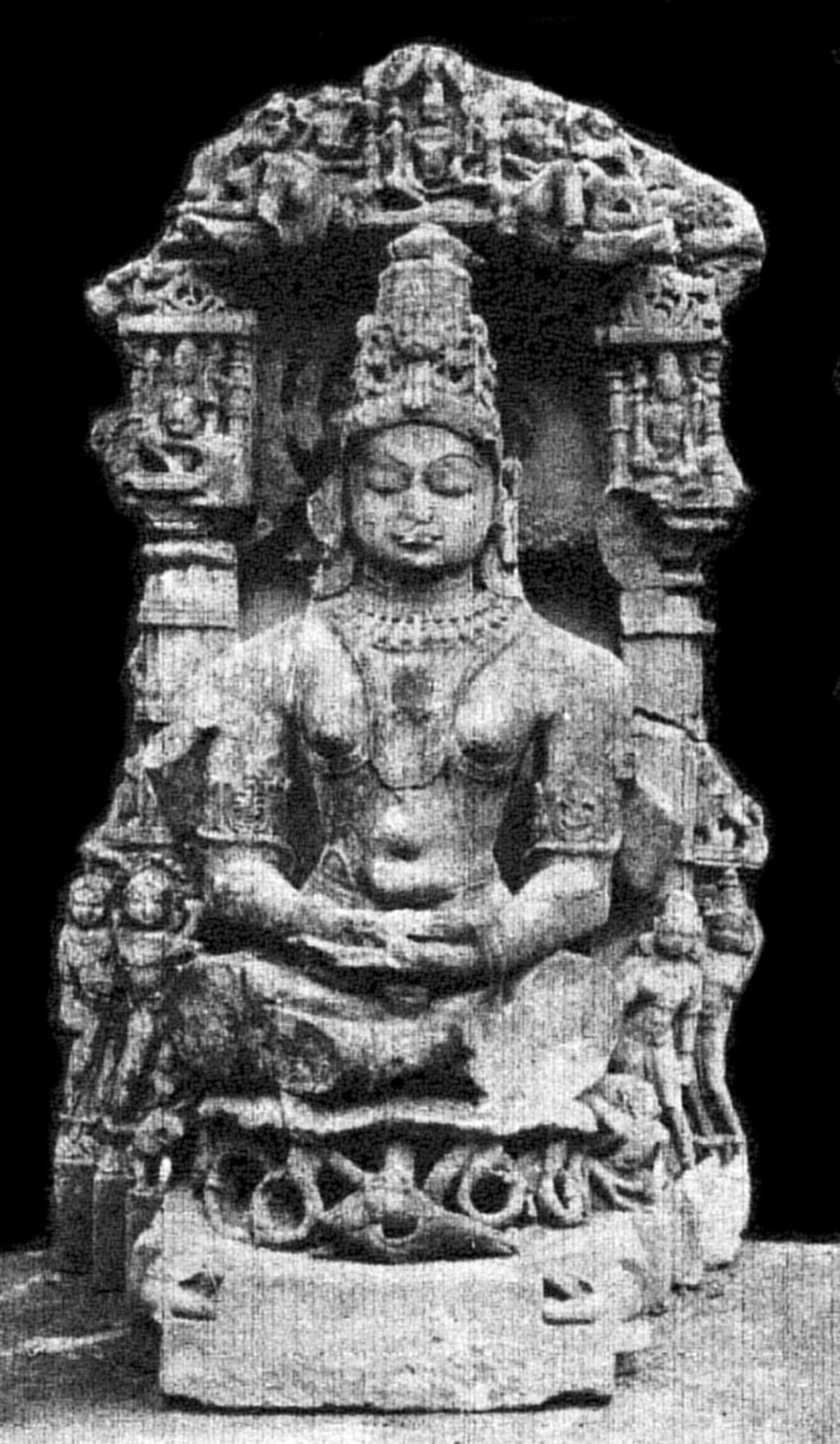
- Buddha incarnation of Vishnu, from Sunari, Medieval period
- Other names: Siddhartha Gautama, Mayamoha
- Devanagari: बुद्ध
- Affiliation: Ninth avatar of Vishnu; Deva
- Mantra: Om Muni Muni Mahamuni Shakyamuniye Svaha
- Symbols: Swastika, Dharmachakra, Modaka
- Day: Thursday
- Texts: Harivamsa; Bhagavata Purana; Garuda Purana; Vishnu Purana
- Gender: Male
- Festivals: Buddha Purnima

Genealogy
- Born: Siddhartha Gautama c. 563 BCE or 480 BCE; Lumbini, Shakya Republic (present-day Lumbini Province, Nepal)
- Died: c. 483 BCE or 400 BCE (aged 80); Kushinagar, Malla Republic (present-day Uttar Pradesh, India)
- Parents: Śuddhodana (father); Maya (mother); Pajapati (step-mother)
- Consort: Yaśodharā
- Children: Rāhula (son)

Dashavatara Sequence
- Predecessor: Krishna/Balarama
- Successor: Kalki

The Buddha (Sanskrit: बुद्ध, lit. 'the enlightened one') is considered the ninth avatar among the ten major avatars of the god Vishnu, according to the Vaishnava tradition of Hinduism. (Note: Coulter 2013, p. 109: "According to some, Buddha was the ninth avatar of Vishnu. Buddhists do not accept this theory.")

The Buddha has been among the formative forces in the origins of Hinduism. Regional Hindu texts over the centuries have presented a spectrum of views on Buddhism, possibly reflecting the competition between Buddhism and the Brahmanical traditions. In contemporary Hinduism, the Buddha is revered by Hindus who usually consider "Buddhism to be another form of Hinduism." Other Hindus reject the identification of Gautama Buddha as an avatar of Vishnu, referring to the texts of the Puranas and identifying the two as different individuals.

== Avatar of Vishnu ==
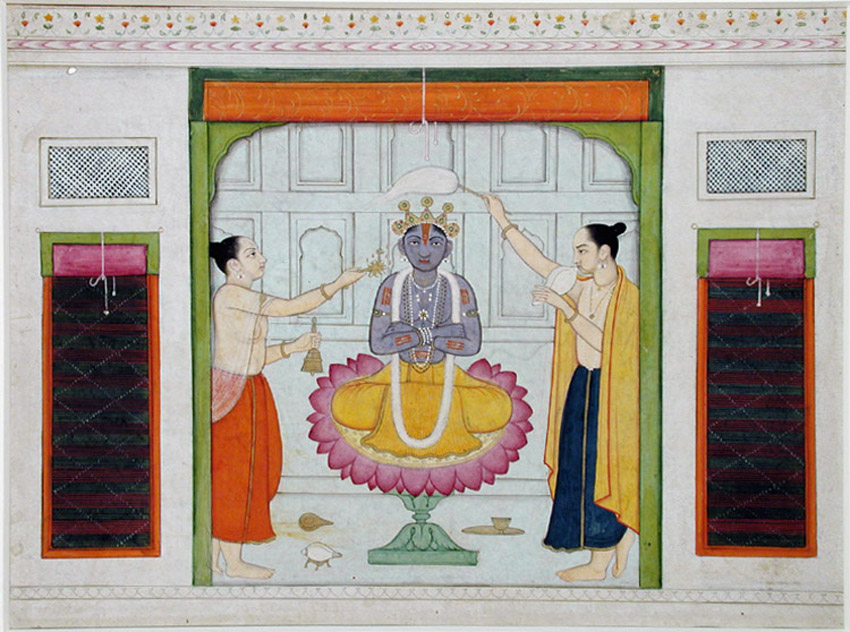
Vishnu as the Buddha, flanked by disciples

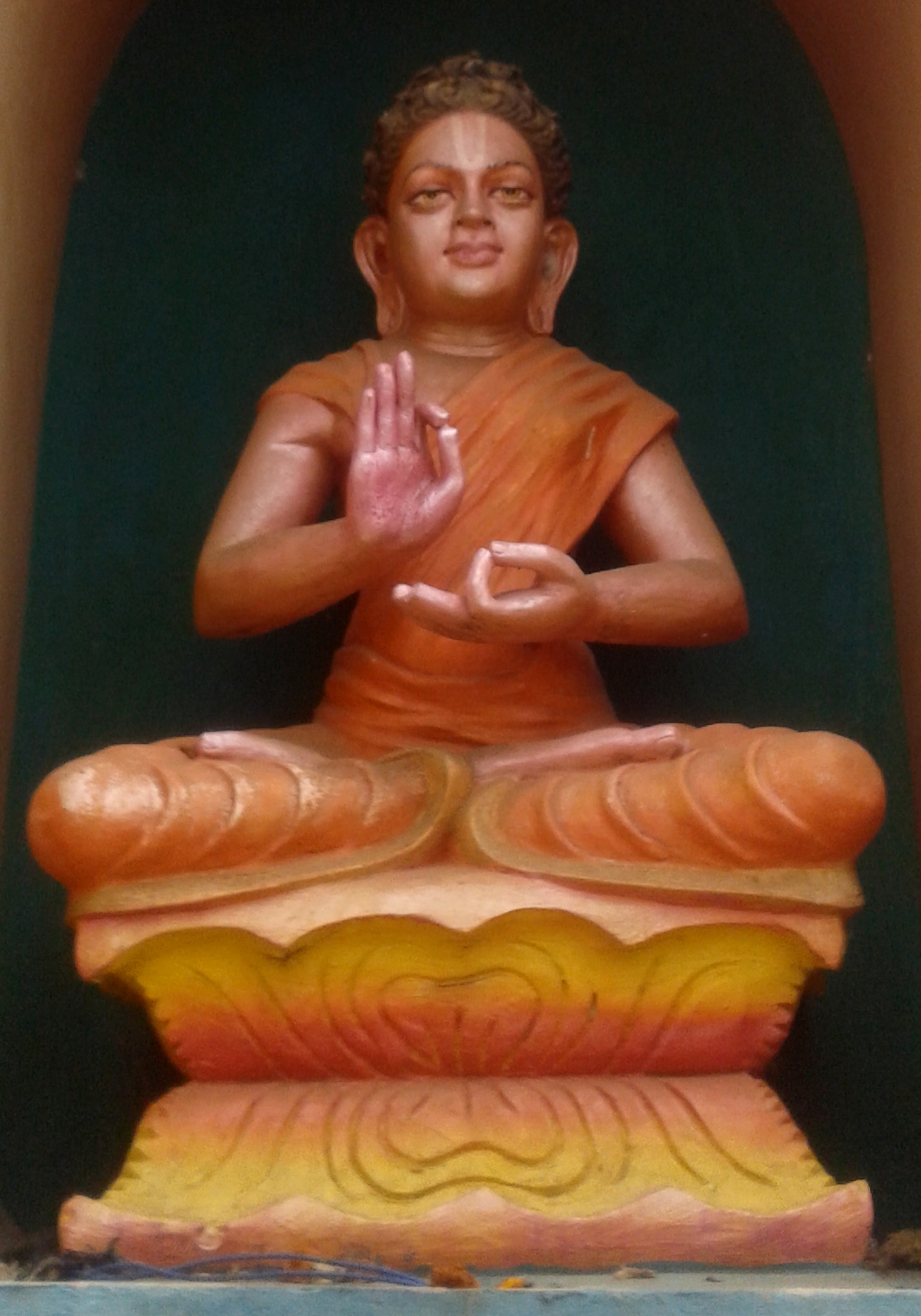
Buddha as an avatar at Dwaraka Tirumala temple, Andhra Pradesh

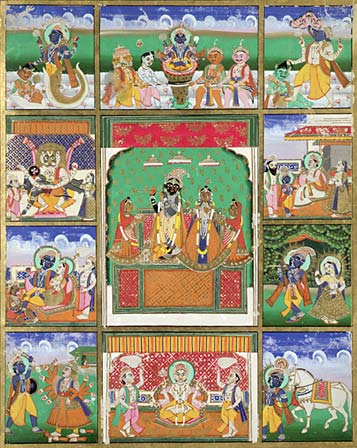
Some Hindus regard the Buddha (bottom centre) as one of the 10 avatars of Vishnu.

The Buddha was integrated into Vaishnavism through its legends and similar work in restoring the dhamma ('Dharma') in the Vaishnava Puranas, where the Buddha is considered as the ninth avatar of Vishnu. According to the Agni Purana, Vishnu assumed this incarnation on earth due to the daityas (a race of asuras) defeating the devas in their battles. In order to restore the natural order, he deluded the asuras with his teachings. This resulted in them abandoning the path established by the Vedas as they converted to Buddhism, in turn causing them to be devoid of dharma. This caused them to become dasyus at the end of the Kali Yuga. As a consequence, they were sent to Naraka, devoid of good conduct. Furthermore, the Buddha causes the age to be characterised by the intermixture of the varnas and domination by the Mlecchas (barbarian and foreign forces to Vedic cultures). Subsequently, according to tradition, it became the responsibility of Adi Shankaracharya and future Vaishnava acharyas to re-establish theism.

=== Chronology ===
The adoption of the Buddha in texts relating to Hindu gods and of Hindu gods in Buddhist texts is difficult to place chronologically. According to Doniger, the myth of the Buddha avatar first appeared in the pre-Gupta period, when orthodox brahmanistic Vedic traditions were threatened by the rise of Buddhism and Jainism (and by foreign invaders). According to Doniger, "Hindus came to regard the Buddha as an avatar of Vishnu between A.D. 450 and the sixth century," first appearing in the Vishnu Purana (400-500 CE). According to John Holt, "The replacement of the Buddha as the "cosmic person" within the mythic ideology of Indian kingship [...] occurred at about the same time the Buddha was incorporated and subordinated within the Brahmanical cult of Vishnu."

=== In literature ===
The Buddha is mentioned as an avatar of Vishnu in the Puranas and the epics such as:

- Harivamsa (1.41)
- Vishnu Purana (3.18)
- Bhagavata Purana (1.3.24, 2.7.37, 11.4.22)
- Garuda Purana (1.1, 2.30.37, 3.15.26)
- Agni Purana (16, 49.8)
- Naradiya Purana (2.72)
- Linga Purana (1.71)
- Padma Purana (3.252)

Another important scripture that mentions him as an avatar is Parashara's Brihat Parashara Hora Shastra (2:1-5/7).

Buddha as an avatar of Vishnu is part of a cosmic cycle, in which the dharma is destroyed in the Kali Yuga, and then restored again in the Satya Yuga, when Vishnu incarnates as Kalki. The Bhavishya Purana incorporates historical facts about dynastical lineages, stating the following:

At this time, reminded of the Kali Age, the god Vishnu became born as Gautama, the Shakyamuni, and taught the Buddhist dharma for ten years. Then Shuddodana ruled for twenty years, and Shakyasimha for twenty. At the first stage of the Kali Age, the path of the Vedas was destroyed and all men became Buddhists. Those who sought refuge with Vishnu were deluded.

Some Hindu texts, such as the Bhagavata Purana, prophesy the existence of Buddha, born to lead the atheists. Bhagavata Purana 1.3.24:

Then, in the beginning of Kali-yuga, for the purpose of deluding those who are envious of the faithful theist, [he] will appear as Buddha, the son of Añjanā, in the Kīkaṭas. (Note: tataḥ kalau sampravṛtte sammohāya sura-dviṣām । :buddho nāmnāñjana-sutaḥ kīkaṭeṣu bhaviṣyati ॥)

In the Skanda Purana, the Buddha is stated to be one of the incarnations of Vasudeva, and begin enchanting the universe, causing righteousness to dissipate and immorality to prevail:

By becoming Buddha, I shall delude by the use of fallacious reasoning and deceit the Asuras who adopting Vedic practices will harass the three worlds.

— Skanda Purana

Similarly, Acyuta will take up the next birth as Buddha. The Slayer of Madhu, the Lord of the chiefs of Devas, who is fond of the spring season, will be very quiescent. With Lord Parameṣṭhin in the form of Buddha the entire universe consisting of mobile and immobile beings will become enchanted. Ever since then, O descendant of Bharata, sons do not pay heed to the words of fathers, relatives do not pay heed to the words of elders, nor students to the words of preceptors. Everything will become topsy turvy. Dharma is defeated by Adharma, truthfulness by falsehood, kings by thieves, and men by women.

— Skanda Purana, Chapter 151

His father is usually called Śuddhodhana, which is consistent with the Buddhist tradition, while in a few places the Buddha's father is named Añjana or Jina. This is due to the fact that in some texts both Buddhism and Jainism are used by Vishnu to mislead the demons, and a confusion of names and doctrines appears, when the Buddha is called the son of Jina, mistakenly mimicking Buddhist texts which refer to the Buddha as Jina (conqueror), a term more often used in Jainism.

Other texts portray him in a more positive way, as born to stop all killing of animals. Only a few statements mention the worship of Buddha, e.g. the Varahapurana states that one desirous of beauty should worship him. Some pre-14th-century Hindu temples include Buddha reliefs with the same reverence they show for other avatars of Vishnu, but though an avatar of Vishnu, the Buddha is rarely worshipped like Krishna and Rama in Hinduism.

=== Assimilation of Buddhist influences ===
The adoption of the Buddha may also have been a way to assimilate aspects of Buddhism into the fold of Hinduism. According to Wendy Doniger, "Helmuth von Glasenapp attributed these developments to a Hindu desire to absorb Buddhism in a peaceful manner, both to win Buddhists to Vaishnavism and also to account for the fact that such a significant heresy could exist in India." (Note: Von Glasenapp 1962 page 113, cited in Doniger O'Flaherty 1988, p. 206)

According to Donald Swearer, the understanding of the Buddha in Hinduism is a part of his wider and diverse influences. Even within Buddhism, states Swearer, the Buddha and his ideas are conceptualized differently between Theravada, Mahayana, Tibetan, Japanese and other traditions. Similarly, in various traditions of Hinduism (and elsewhere), the Buddha is accepted and interpreted in different ways.

=== Syncretism ===
Much like Hinduism's adoption of the Buddha as an avatar, Buddhism legends too adopted Krishna in their Jataka tales, claiming Krishna (Vishnu avatar) to be a character whom Buddha met and taught in his previous births. (Note: Krishna and Buddha interact in several Jataka tales such as number 454, 530 and 536. Vishnu appears in some Buddhist manuscripts as Venhu, but not as consistently as Krishna. In the Ghata Jataka, the Hindu god Krishna is depicted as an immature person and Buddha teaches him wisdom.(Sullivan 1999, pp. 103–105 with footnotes)(Hiltebeitel 1990, pp. 64–68)) According to Alf Hiltebeitel and other scholars, some of the stories in Buddha-related Jataka tales found in Pali texts seem slanderous distortions of Hindu legends, but these may reflect the ancient local traditions and the complexities of early interaction between the two Indian religions.

While the Buddhist Jataka texts co-opt Krishna-Vasudeva and make him a student of the Buddha in his previous life, the Hindu texts co-opt the Buddha and make him an avatar of Vishnu. Similarly, in Dasaratha Jataka Buddha identifies himself as Rama.

== Rejection ==
Buddhists traditionally do not accept the Buddha to be a Vishnu avatar. B. R. Ambedkar, an Indian scholar and the Dalit leader who in 1935 declared his intention to convert from Hinduism to Buddhism and converted about 20 years later, rejected the belief that Buddha was an incarnation of Vishnu. (Note: Ambedkar, while he was a Hindu and before he launched a new form of Buddhism, reinterpreted Buddha's teachings into what he called Navayana (New Vehicle), wherein he developed a Marxist interpretation of said teachings. He founded and converted to a new version of Buddhism, a version which criticized and rejected Hinduism, but also Theravada Buddhism and Mahayana Buddhism because, according to Ambedkar, they all misrepresented the Buddha.). Ambedkar's 5th vow out of Twenty-two vows is :

I do not and shall not believe that Lord Buddha was the incarnation of Vishnu. I believe this to be sheer madness and false propaganda.

Some contemporary Hindus also reject the identification of Gautama Buddha as an avatar of Vishnu, referring to the texts of the Puranas. Gurus of the Gaudiya Vaishnava theology argue that in Bhagavata Purana (1.3.24), "son of Ajana," refers to the Vishnu avatar born to Ajana (c. 1800 BCE, according to Stephen Knapp) while Gautama was born to Maya and Śuddodhana. They further argue that epithets for the Buddha like Sugata Buddha and Adi Buddha refer to the Vishnu avatar, not to Gautama Buddha, based on Amarakosha and other Buddhist texts. Contrary to Bhagavata Purana, R.S. Bhattacharya notes that the Kalki Purana (2.7.44) refers to Māyādevī as the mother of the Buddha.

In 1999, Śaṅkarācārya of Kanchi, Jayendra Saraswathi had released a joint statement with Vipassanācharya S. N. Goenka and declared that:

in order to foster friendlier ties between the two communities [the Vedic and Śramaṇa traditions] we decide that whatever has happened in the past (cannot be undone, but) should be forgotten and such beliefs [on the Buddha being an avatāra of Vishnu] should not be propagated.

Shankaracharya of Govardhan Math, Swami Shri Nishchalananda Saraswati, too has stated that the Buddha avatar of Vishnu and Gautama Buddha were different persons.

== Iconography ==
The Agni Purana describes how the figure of the Buddha should be represented:

The figure of Buddha (should be made) as calm, having long ears, white complexion, wearing a cloth, and seated on a lotus with its petals upwards and as conferring favour and protection.

— Chapter 49, Verse 8

== Contemporary reverence ==
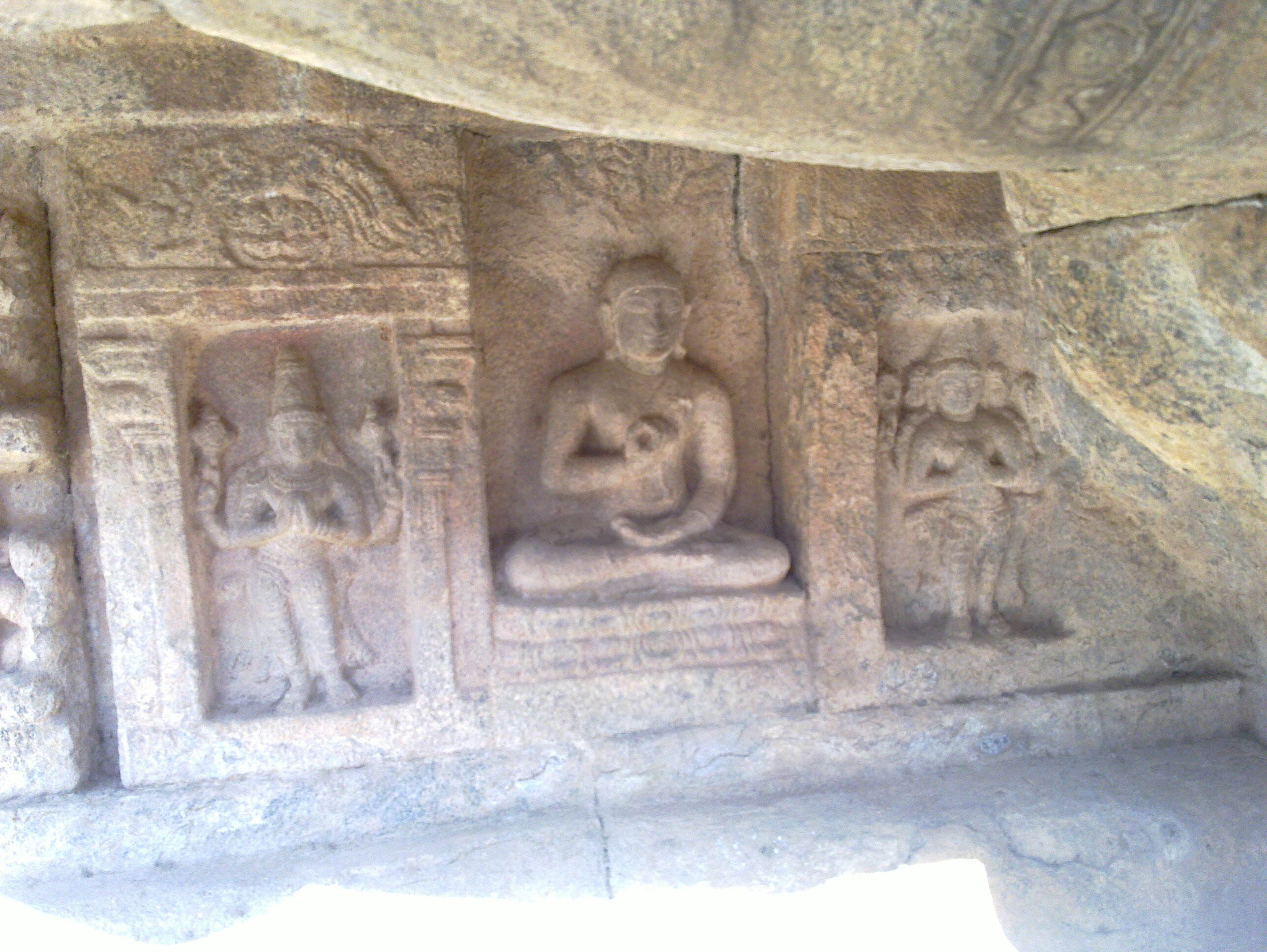
Buddha as an avatara at Airavatesvara Temple

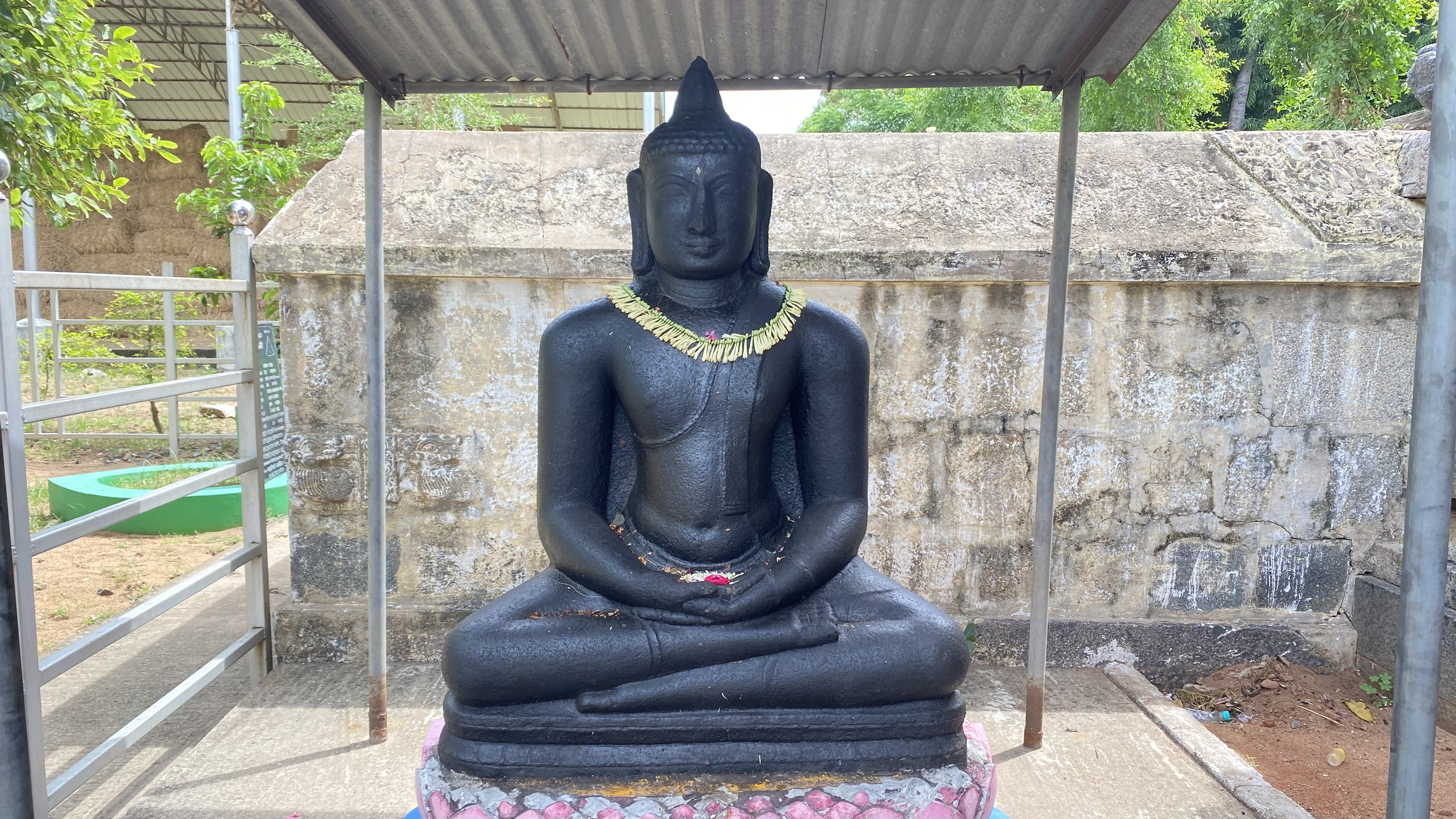
Statue of Buddha in Thiruvathigai Veerateeswarar Temple

The Buddha is considered a holy being in Hindu tradition, and revered as one who was awakened in India. Outside India, some contemporary Hindus revere the Buddha along with other gods during their festivals.

Prominent modern proponents of Hinduism, such as Sarvepalli Radhakrishnan and Swami Vivekananda, consider the Buddha as an example of the same universal truth that underlies religions. (Note: Universal truth: Vivekananda: "May he who is the Brahman of the Hindus, the Ahura Mazda of Zoroastrians, the Buddha of Buddhists, the Jehovah of the Jews, the Father in Heavens of Christians, give strength to you to carry out your noble ideas!"; Radhakrishnan: "If a Hindu chants the Vedas on the banks of the Ganges... if the Japanese worship the image of Buddha, if the European is convinced of Christ's mediatorship, if the Arab reads the Koran in the mosque... It is their deepest apprehension of God and God's fullest revelation to them.") A number of revolutionary figures in modern Hinduism, including Mahatma Gandhi, have been inspired by the life and teachings of the Buddha and many of his attempted reforms. Steven Collins sees such Hindu claims regarding Buddhism as part of an effort – itself a reaction to Christian proselytizing efforts in India – to show that "all religions are one", and that Hinduism is uniquely valuable because it alone recognizes this fact.

Contemporary Hindus usually consider "Buddhism to be another form of Hinduism." Various scholars in India, Sri Lanka and outside South Asia state that the colonial era and contemporary attempts to assimilate Buddha into the Hindu fold are a nationalistic political agenda, where "the Buddha has been reclaimed triumphantly as a symbol of indigenous nationalist understandings of India's history and culture."

According to Lars Tore Flåten, Hindu perceptions, particularly in the literature by Hindu nationalists, are that "Buddha did not break away from the spiritual ideas of his age and country," claiming that scholars such as Hermann Oldenberg (1854-1920), Thomas Rhys Davids (1843-1922) and Sarvepalli Radhakrishnan (1888-1975) state there is much in common between "Buddhism and the contemporary Hinduism." (Note: These perceptions cite, for example, the Pali scholar Rhys Davids' analysis in Buddhism: Being a Sketch of the Life and Teachings of Gautama, the Buddha, where he wrote: "But the foregoing account will be sufficient, I hope, to remove at least one misconception – the prevalent notion that Gautama was an enemy to Hinduism, and that his chief claim on the gratitude of his countrymen lies in his having destroyed a system of iniquity and oppression and fraud. This is not the case. Gautama was born, and brought up, and lived, and died a Hindu." The Oxford professor and later President of India, Sarvepalli Radhakrishnan states that "as a matter of fact, nowhere did Buddha repudiate the Upanishad conception of Brahman, the absolute"; that Buddha, if anything, "accepted the Upanishad's position".) Yet, in present-day scholarly consensus, Buddhism is considered to be very different from pre-Buddhist Indian religion. (Note: For example, Indologist Richard Gombrich wrote that the Buddha was a radical religious reformer, making religious practice and salvation a more personal matter than it was before the arising of Buddhism. Buddhologists like K.R. Norman and Richard Gombrich argue that the Buddha's anatta theory does indeed extend to the Brahmanical belief expounded in the Brihadaranyaka Upanishad that the Self (Atman) is the Universal Self, or Brahman. They point to the Pali Alagaddūpama-sutta, where the Buddha argues that an individual cannot experience the suffering of the entire world. Buddhism, like Hinduism and other major Indian religions, asserts that everything is impermanent (anicca), but, unlike them, also asserts that there is no permanent self or soul in living beings (anattā). (Note: [a] Anatta, Encyclopædia Britannica (2013), Quote: "Anatta in Buddhism, the doctrine that there is in humans no permanent, underlying soul. The concept of anatta, or anatman, is a departure from the Hindu belief in atman ("the self")."; [b] Steven Collins (1994), Religion and Practical Reason (Editors: Frank Reynolds, David Tracy), State Univ of New York Press, ISBN 978-0791422175, page 64; "Central to Buddhist soteriology is the doctrine of not-self (Pali: anattā, Sanskrit: anātman, the opposed doctrine of ātman is central to Brahmanical thought). Put very briefly, this is the [Buddhist] doctrine that human beings have no soul, no self, no unchanging essence."; [c] John C. Plott et al (2000), Global History of Philosophy: The Axial Age, Volume 1, Motilal Banarsidass, ISBN 978-8120801585, page 63, Quote: "The Buddhist schools reject any Ātman concept. As we have already observed, this is the basic and ineradicable distinction between Hinduism and Buddhism"; [d] Katie Javanaud (2013), Is The Buddhist 'No-Self' Doctrine Compatible With Pursuing Nirvana?, Philosophy Now; [e] David Loy (1982), Enlightenment in Buddhism and Advaita Vedanta: Are Nirvana and Moksha the Same?, International Philosophical Quarterly, Volume 23, Issue 1, pages 65–74) The ignorance or misperception (avijjā) that anything is permanent or that there is self in any being is considered a wrong understanding in Buddhism, and the primary source of clinging and suffering (dukkha). Buddha endorsed and taught the concept of rebirth. This refers to a process whereby beings go through a succession of lifetimes as one of many possible forms of sentient life, each running from conception to death. In Buddhist thought, however, this rebirth does not involve any soul, unlike Hinduism and Jainism. According to Buddhism the atman concept is incorrect, untrue. (Note: [a] Christmas Humphreys (2012). Exploring Buddhism. Routledge. pp. 42–43. ISBN 978-1-136-22877-3. [b] Brian Morris (2006). Religion and Anthropology: A Critical Introduction. Cambridge University Press. p. 51. ISBN 978-0-521-85241-8., Quote: "(...) anatta is the doctrine of non-self, and is an extreme empiricist doctrine that holds that the notion of an unchanging permanent self is a fiction and has no reality. According to Buddhist doctrine, the individual person consists of five skandhas or heaps – the body, feelings, perceptions, impulses and consciousness. The belief in a self or soul, over these five skandhas, is illusory and the cause of suffering." [c] Gombrich (2006), page 47, Quote: "(...) Buddha's teaching that beings have no soul, no abiding essence. This 'no-soul doctrine' (anatta-vada) he expounded in his second sermon."))

== See also ==
- Buddhism and Hinduism
- Dashavatara
- Vaishnavism

== Notes ==
Subnotes

== Sources ==
Printed sources

- Coulter, Charles Russell (2013). Encyclopedia of Ancient Deities. Routledge. ISBN 978-1-135-96390-3.
- Cousins, L.S. (1996). "The Dating of the Historical Buddha: A Review Article". Journal of the Royal Asiatic Society. 3. 6 (1): 57–63. doi:10.1017/s1356186300014760. ISSN 1356-1863. JSTOR 25183119. S2CID 162929573. Archived from the original on 26 February 2011 – via Indology.
- Cowell, E.B.; Rouse, WHD (1901). The Jātaka: Or, Stories of the Buddha's Former Births. Cambridge University Press.
- Doniger O'Flaherty, Wendy (1988), The Origins of Evil in Hindu Mythology, Motilal Banarsidass Publ.
- Francis, H. T.; Thomas, E. J. (1916). Jataka Tales. Cambridge University Press (Reprinted: 2014). ISBN 978-1-107-41851-6.
- Hiltebeitel, Alf (1990). The Ritual of Battle: Krishna in the Mahabharata. State University of New York Press. ISBN 978-0-7914-0250-4.
- Holt, John Clifford (2004). The Buddhist Viṣṇu: Religious Transformation, Politics, and Culture. Columbia University Press.
- Holt, John Clifford (2008). The Buddhist Viṣṇu: Religious Transformation, Politics, and Culture. Motilal Banarsidass. ISBN 978-81-208-3269-5.
- Holt, John Clifford; Kinnard, Jacob N.; Walters, Jonathan S., eds. (2012). Constituting Communities: Theravada Buddhism and the Religious Cultures of South and Southeast Asia. SUNY Press. ISBN 9780791487051.
- Jones, Constance; Ryan, James D. (2006). Encyclopedia of Hinduism. Infobase. ISBN 978-0-8160-7564-5.
- Kramrisch, Stella (1946). The Hindu Temple. Motilal Banarsidass. ISBN 978-81-208-0224-7.
- Lochtefeld, James G. (2002). The Illustrated Encyclopedia of Hinduism: A-M. The Rosen Publishing Group. ISBN 978-0-8239-3179-8.
- Malalasekera, Gunapala Piyasena (2007). Dictionary of Pāli Proper Names: A-Dh. Motilal Banarsidass. ISBN 978-81-208-3021-9.
- Norman, K.R. (1997), A Philological Approach to Buddhism, The Bukkyo Dendo Kyokai Lectures 1994, School of Oriental and African Studies (University of London)
- Prebish, Charles S. (2008), "Cooking the Buddhist Books: The Implications of the New Dating of the Buddha for the History of Early Indian Buddhism" (PDF), Journal of Buddhist Ethics, 15: 1–21, ISSN 1076-9005, archived from the original (PDF) on 28 January 2012
- Srinivasan, Amrutur V. (2011). Hinduism For Dummies. John Wiley & Sons. ISBN 9781118110775.
- Sullivan, Bruce M. (1999). Seer of the Fifth Veda: Kr̥ṣṇa Dvaipāyana Vyāsa in the Mahābhārata. Motilal Banarsidass. ISBN 978-81-208-1676-3.
- Swearer, Donald (2016). Jerryson, Michael (ed.). The Oxford Handbook of Contemporary Buddhism. Oxford University Press. ISBN 978-0-19-936238-7.

Web-sources
