= Sugata =

Epithet for Buddha

Sugata (सुगत) is a Sanskrit epithet for Gautama Buddha. (Note: Sanskrit Dictionary, sugata) In some sects of Vaishnavism, a Sugata Buddha is regarded as the ninth avatar of Vishnu, instead of Gautama Buddha.

== Etymology ==
"Su" is a prefix meaning good and "gata" is the past passive participle of "to go".

Among other meanings, Buddhaghosa says the Buddha is sugata because both the way he took (gata) is good (su) and where he has gone (gata) is good (su). The Mahayana author Haribhadra also says the Buddha is sugata because he is one from whom all faults are totally (suṣṭhu) gone (gata), or into whom all good qualities have gone (gata) with none remaining (suparipūrṇa).

It is customary to relate three denotations of sugata with three stages through which a buddha must pass in order to reach the goal of enlightenment: he has gone well beyond rebirth in saṃsāra, he has gone well into nirvāṇa, and he has gone well into the state of perfect buddhahood (samyaksaṃbuddha).

According to Bhikkhu Khantipalo, the term "sugato" can be translated as "auspicious", "fortunate" or more literally "well gone", "one who has gone to goodness", "one whose going was good". This refers to both the fact that his nirvana was good and that his awakening was a good for the world.

== Five Buddhas ==
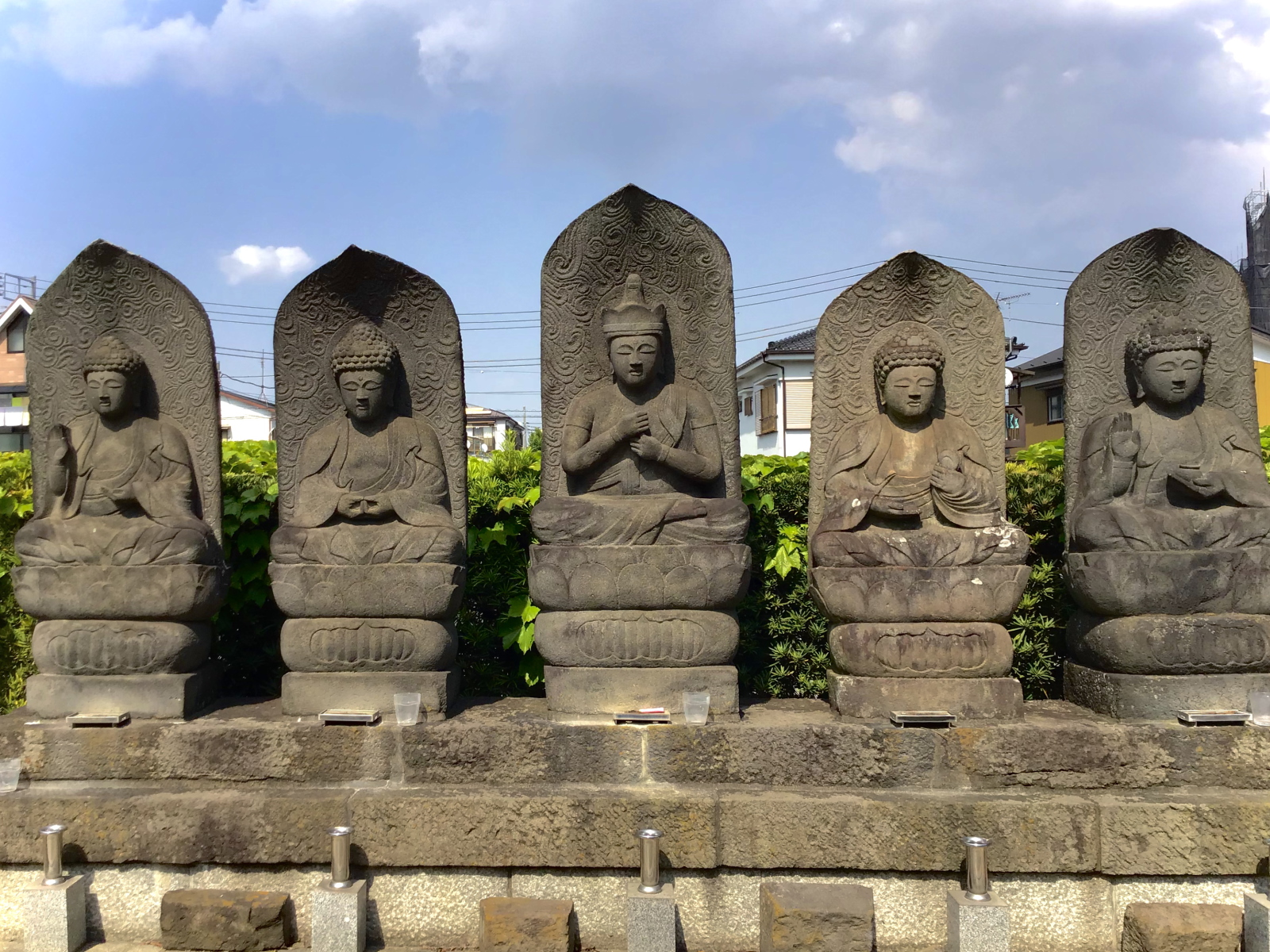
Five Tathāgatas in Shinshoin Temple (Shibamata, Katsushika, Tokyo). From right to left: Akshobhya, Ratnasambhava, Vairocana, Amitābha, and Amoghasiddhi.

Teeuw and Robson mention "5 saugata" in their translation of Kuñjarakarṇa Dharmakathana or Kakawin Kuñjarakarṇa, an Old Javanese kakawin from 15th century written by Mpu Ḍusun. Lokesh Chandra notes that in the Buddhist system this expression would be incorrect; as the pentad isn't termed pañcasugata ("Five Sugatas") but pañcabuddha ("Five Buddhas"), and refers to the Five Tathāgatas :

1. Vairocana (Shining Buddha),
2. Akṣobhya (Immovable Buddha),
3. Ratnasambhava (Jewel-Born Buddha),
4. Amitābha (Endless-Light Buddha),
5. Amoghasiddhi (Unfailing Buddha). (Note: Wisdom Library; Pancabuddha, Pañcabuddha, Panca-buddha)

== In Hinduism ==
In some sects of Vaishnavism, Sugata Buddha is regarded by various Puranas as the ninth avatar among the Dashavatara of Vishnu, instead of Gautama Buddha.

Some Vaishnavite schools argue that Sugata Buddha, the incarnation of Vishnu, was born around 1800 BC in Bodhi-Gaya (Kikata) to Ajana, and was a different person from Gautama Buddha.

As per the Agni Purana, a Sugata Buddha is four handed like Vishnu. He holds the Vedas, a lotus, a japamala, and a vessel to receive alms. In Shiva Purana, he is described as a bald man with faded clothes who was sent to earth as a monk with the task of making Tripurasura leave worship of Vedas and Shiva.

== In Jainism ==
Sugata ("pleasing gait") is a Prakrit name based on the beauty of the human body, mentioned as an example in the Aṅgavijjā chapter 26. This chapter includes general rules to follow when deriving proper names.

The Aṅgavijjā (mentioning sugata) is an ancient treatise from the 3rd century CE dealing with physiognomic readings, bodily gestures and predictions and was written by a Jain ascetic in 9000 Prakrit stanzas.

== See also ==
- Buddhahood
- Gautama Buddha in Hinduism

== Sources ==
Printed sources

- Buswell, Robert Jr; Lopez, Donald S. Jr., eds. (2013). Princeton Dictionary of Buddhism. Princeton, NJ: Princeton University Press. ISBN 9780691157863.
- Carman, John Braisted (1994), Majesty and Meekness: A Comparative Study of Contrast and Harmony in the Concept of God, Wm. B. Eerdmans Publishing
- Chandra, Lokesh (October 1986). "Notes on Kuñjarakarṇa". Bijdragen tot de Taal-, Land- en Volkenkunde. 142 (4): 399–406. doi:10.1163/22134379-90003346.
- Ḍusun (1981). Robson, S.O. (ed.). Kuñjarakarṇa Dharmakathana. Translated by Teeuw, A. The Hague: Martinus Nijhoff. ISBN 9789024761715.
- Harris, Ian (2008), Cambodian Buddhism: History and Practice, University of Hawaii Press
- Keshava, Bhakti Prajnan (2003). "Two Buddhas". Beyond Nirvana: The philosophy of Mayavadism: A life history. Gaudiya Vedanta Publications. pp. 42–49.
- Mills, Laurence-Khantipalo (1990). Buddha, My Refuge: Contemplation of the Buddha Based on the Pali Suttas. Kandy, Sri Lanka: Buddhist Publication Society. ISBN 9552400376.
- Sharma, Tej Ram (1981). Personal and Geographical Names in the Gupta Inscriptions. Delhi: Concept Publishing Company.
- Thaplyal, Kiran Kumar (1972), Studies in Ancient Indian Seals: A Study of North Indian Seals and Sealings
- Tirtha, Bhakti Ballabh. "Sri Buddha-Avatara". Dasavatara: Ten Manifestations of Godhead. pp. 184–197.
- Vaswani, J. P. (2017-12-22). Dasavatara. Jaico Publishing House. ISBN 978-93-86867-18-6.
- Wuaku, Albert (2013), Hindu Gods in West Africa: Ghanaian Devotees of Shiva and Krishna, BRILL

Web sources
