= Twenty-two vows of Ambedkar =

Tenets of Navayana Buddhism

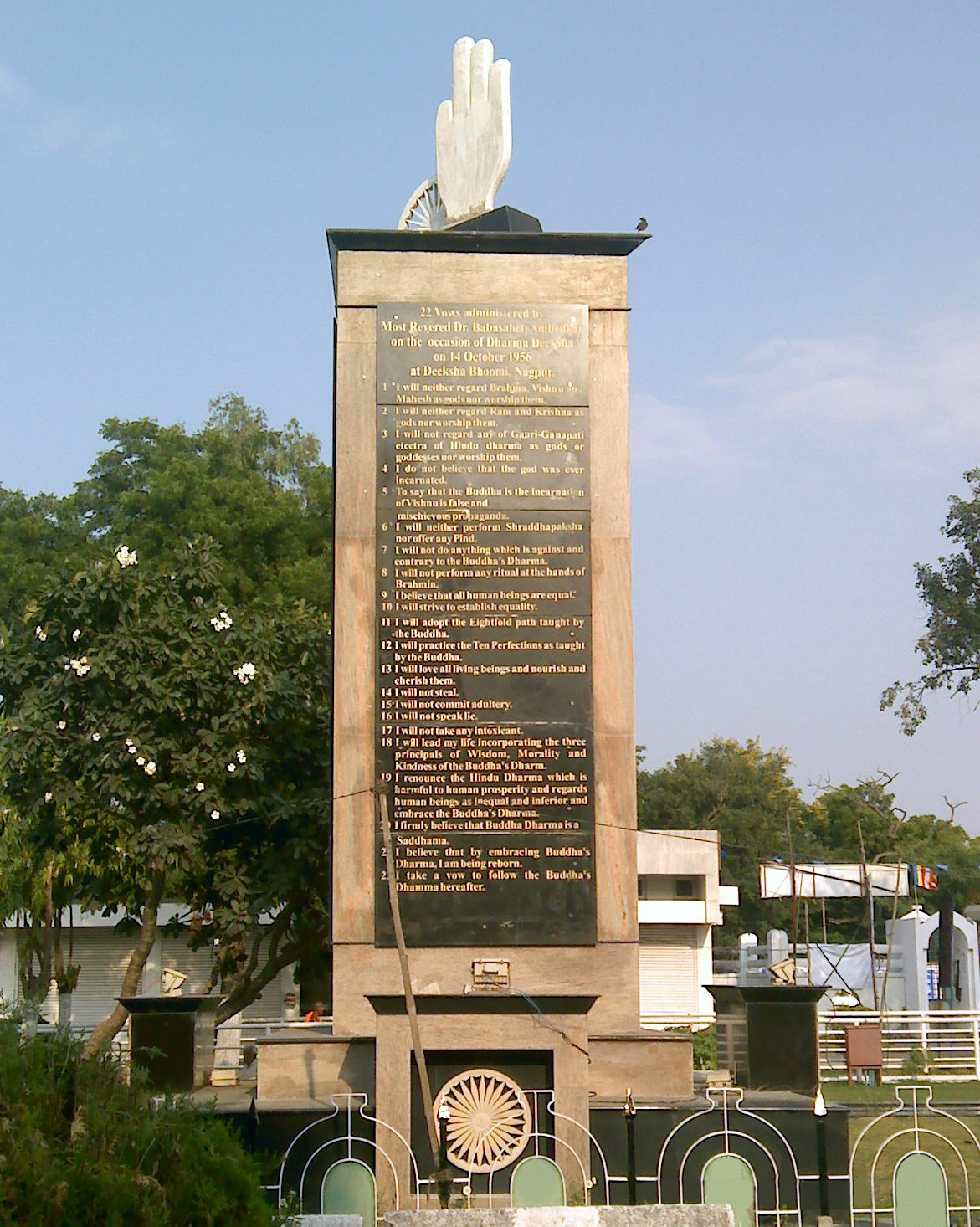
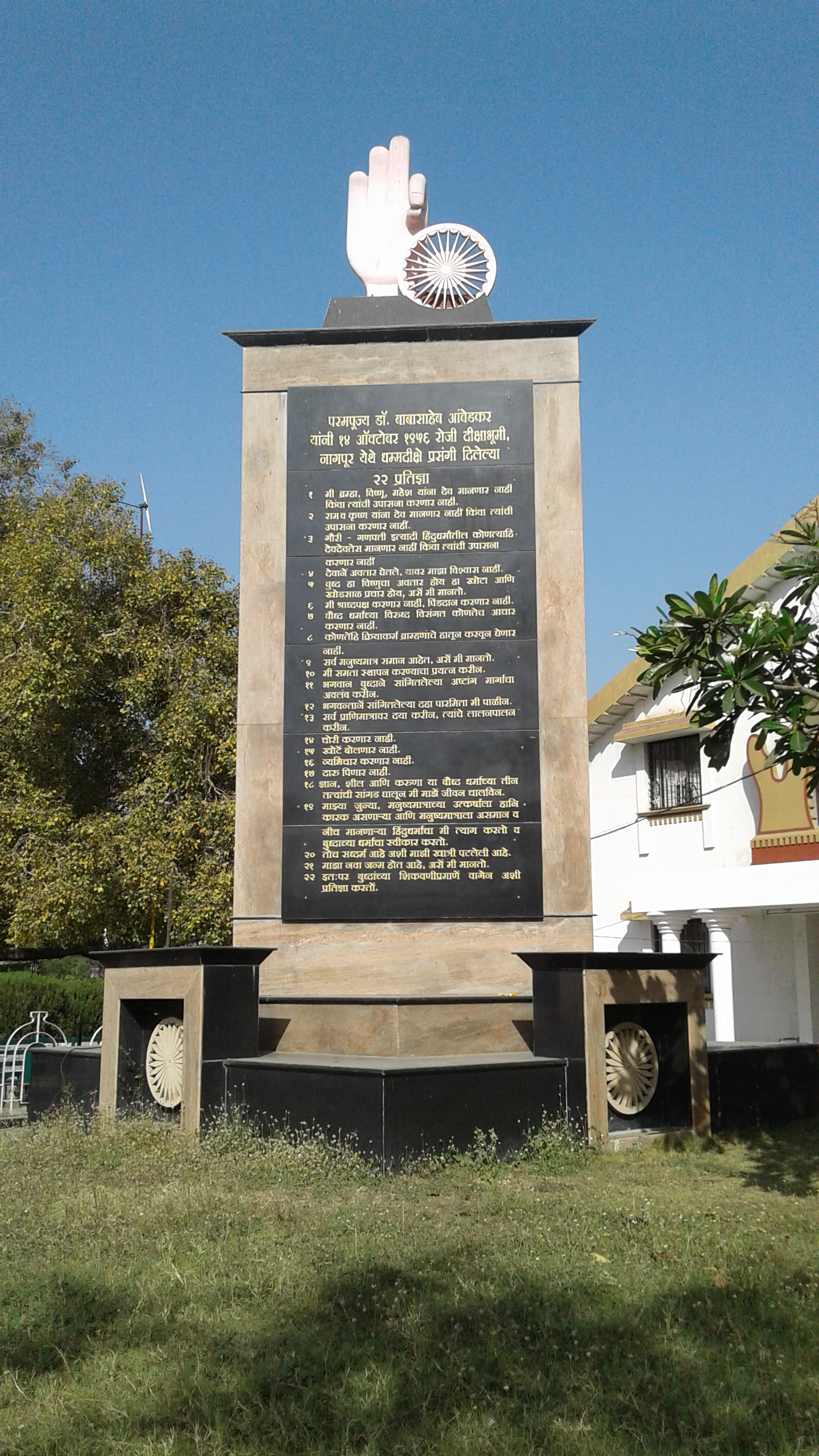
Inscription of the 22 vows at Deekshabhoomi in English and Marathi, respectively

The Twenty-two vows or twenty-two pledges are the 22 Buddhist vows administered by B. R. Ambedkar, the revivalist of Buddhism in India, to his followers. On converting to Buddhism, Ambedkar made 22 vows, and asked his 400,000 supporters to do the same. After receiving lay ordination, Ambedkar gave dhamma diksha to his followers. This ceremony organised on 14 October 1956 in Nagpur included 22 vows administered to all new converts after Three Jewels and Five Precepts. On 16 October 1956, Ambedkar performed another mass religious conversion ceremony at Chandrapur.

It is believed by Ambedkarite Buddhists that these vows are the guidelines of the social revolution that motivates human instincts. These vows demonstrate both the social movement aspect of Navayana Buddhism, and demonstrate its core deviation from earlier schools of Buddhism. In India, these vows are taken as an oath by individuals or groups of people when they convert to Buddhism.

== Vows ==
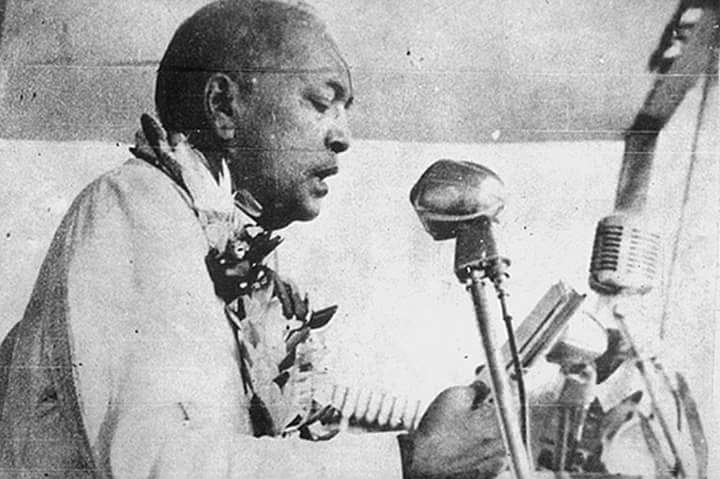
On 14 October 1956, B. R. Ambedkar administering 22 vows after renouncing Hinduism at Deekshabhoomi

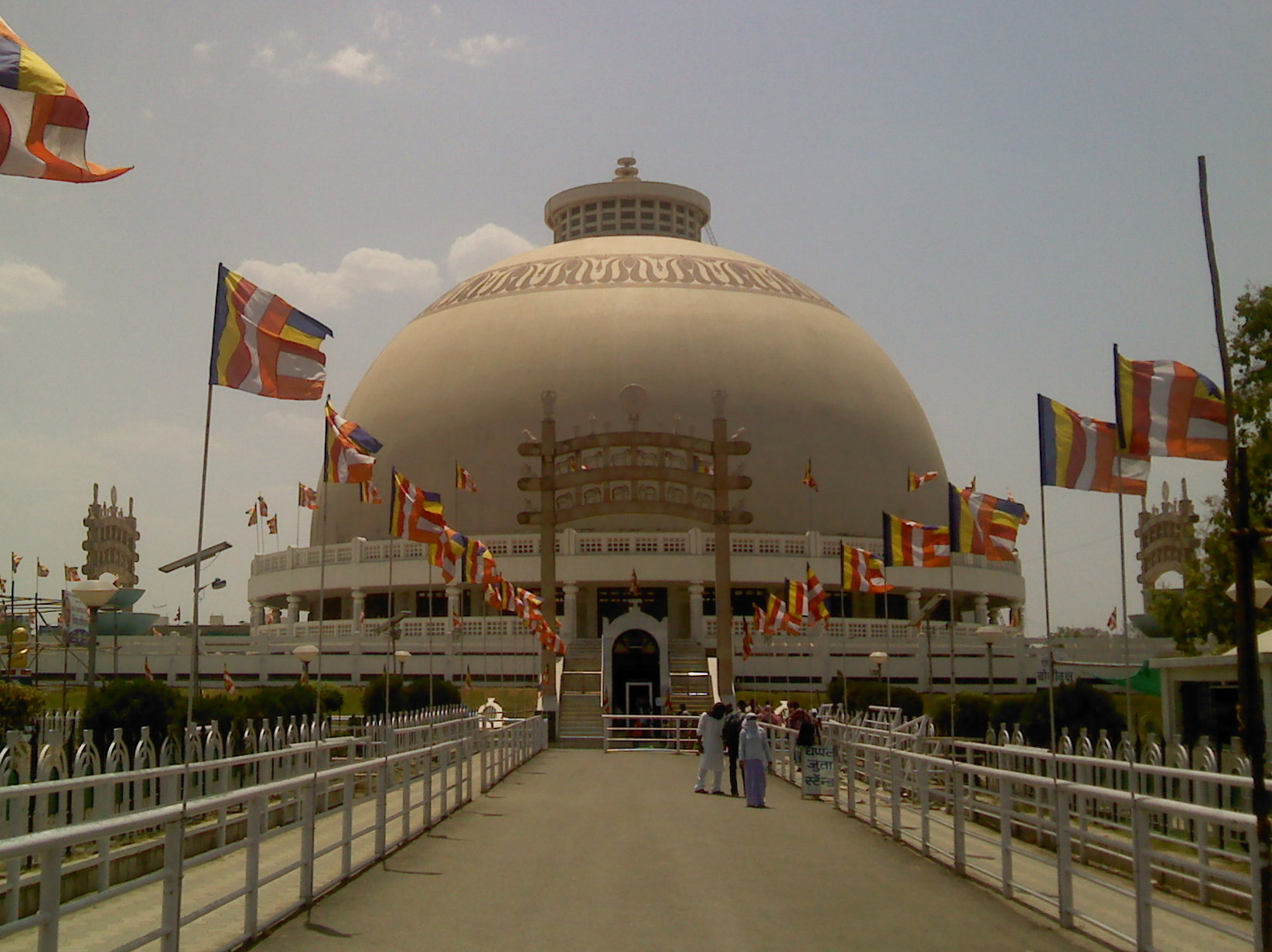
Deekshabhoomi monument, located in Nagpur, where Ambedkar converted to Buddhism in 1956 is the largest religious conversion in the world.

The following are the 22 vows administered by Ambedkar to his followers:

1. I shall have no faith in Brahma, Vishnu and Maheshwara, and I shall not worship them.
2. I shall have no faith in Rama and Krishna, who are believed to be incarnation of God, and I shall not worship them.
3. I shall have no faith in Gauri, Ganapati and other gods and goddesses of Hindus, and I shall not worship them.
4. I do not believe in the incarnation of God.
5. I do not and shall not believe that Lord Buddha was the incarnation of Vishnu. I believe this to be sheer madness and false propaganda.
6. I shall not perform Shraddha and I shall not give pind.
7. I shall not act in a manner violating the principles and teachings of the Buddha.
8. I shall not allow ceremonies to be performed by Brahmins.
9. I shall believe in the equality of man.
10. I shall endeavour to establish equality.
11. I shall follow the Noble Eightfold Path of Buddha.
12. I shall follow the ten paramitas prescribed by the Buddha.
13. I shall have compassion and loving-kindness for all living beings and protect them.
14. I shall not steal.
15. I will not commit adultery.
16. I will not speak lie.
17. I shall not take intoxicants like liquor, drugs, etc.
  (The previous five proscriptive vows [#13–17] are from the Five Precepts.)
18. I shall endeavour to follow the Noble Eightfold Path and practice compassion and loving-kindness in everyday life.
19. I renounce Hinduism which is harmful to humanity and impedes the advancement and development of humanity, and adopt Buddhism as my religion.
20. I firmly believe the Dhamma of the Buddha is the only true religion.
21. I believe that by adopting Buddhism I am having a rebirth.
22. I solemnly declare and affirm that I shall hereafter lead my life according to the principles and teachings of the Buddha and his Dhamma.

Considering the historical significance of these twenty-two vows, the then president of "Dr. Babasaheb Ambedkar Deekshabhoomi Memorial Committee", and former Governor of Bihar and Kerala R. S. Gavai and Sadanand Fulzele, the secretary of the organization, have carved these 22 vows on a wide marble stone at the Deekshabhoomi ground and placed the pillar at the first sight of the stupa. At a Buddha Vihara at Wardha, under M. L. Kasare's leadership, a similar grand pillar has been erected.

== Bibliography ==
- Omvedt, Gail (2003). Buddhism in India: Challenging Brahmanism and caste. Thousand Oaks, CA: Sage Publications. ISBN 0761996648 – via archive.org.
- "Ambedkar's 22 vows: Why Babasaheb made the pledge at the centre of BJP-AAP row". The Indian Express. 8 October 2022.
