= Stephen Knapp (author) =

American author of Hindu texts

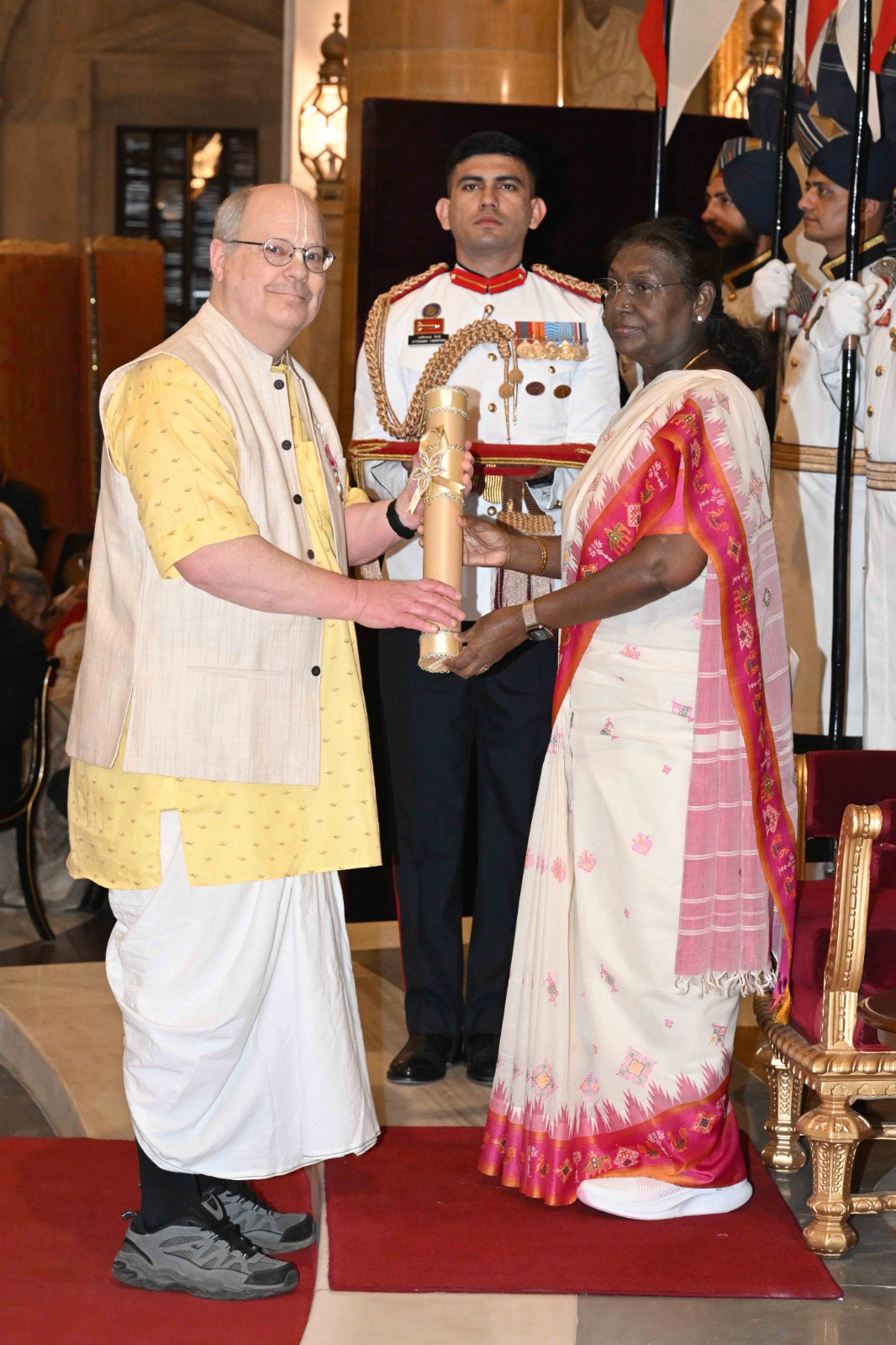
- Knapp (left) receiving the Padma Shri in 2025.jpg
- Born: United States
- Other names: Sri Nandanandana Dasa (Śrī Nandanandana Dāsa)
- Occupations: Author; Researcher; Lecturer; Spiritual practitioner
- Known for: Writings on Vedic culture, promoting Sanātana Dharma
- Awards: Padma Shri (2025)
- Title: Associated with ISKCON Detroit

Religious life
- Religion: Hinduism
- Order: Brahma-Madhva-Gaudiya sampradaya
- School: Gaudiya Vaishnavism

Religious career
- Teacher: A. C. Bhaktivedanta Swami Prabhupada
- Website: www.stephen-knapp.com

Stephen Knapp, also known by his spiritual name Sri Nandanandana Dasa (Śrī Nandanandana Dāsa), is an American author, spiritual practitioner, researcher, and lecturer on Vedic culture (Sanātana Dharma) and philosophy. He is associated with the International Society for Krishna Consciousness (ISKCON) and is a disciple of A. C. Bhaktivedanta Swami Prabhupada.

Knapp has authored numerous books and articles focused on Vedic traditions, philosophy, and Indian spirituality. His works include The Secret Teachings of the Vedas, Proof of Vedic Culture's Global Existence, and The Heart of Hinduism. He is the founder of the Vedic Friends Association (VFA) and heads the ISKCON temple in Detroit, Michigan.

In January 2025, the Government of India announced that Knapp would be awarded the Padma Shri, the country's fourth-highest civilian honor, for his contributions in the field of Literature and Education. The award recognized his efforts in promoting Indian traditions and spiritual heritage globally. He received the award from President Droupadi Murmu at the Rashtrapati Bhavan on April 28, 2025.
