= Hela Khayal Dangal =

Folk theatre from Rajasthan, India

Hela Khayal Dangal is a distinct form of folk theatre of Rajasthan. It consists of competing performances of musical sarcasm by different troupes. The tradition started almost three hundred years ago in Rajasthan. Many places used to organize Hela Khayal Competitions, but Lalsot became its most important center. Every year folk artists gather at Lalsot, Dausa around the festival of Gangaur. The live performances showcase creative content, folk singing, folk instruments. The performances are organized over three days continuously with only brief breaks in front of the entire population as audience. Entry for the audience is unrestricted. It originated as a form of entertainment by the peasants and gained fame for brilliant satires on issues of contemporary concerns.

== History and heritage ==
The history of Hela Khayal has not been properly documented as it was a folk art. It is certain that the tradition goes back almost three centuries in various places of Rajasthan. Dausa, Karauli, Sawai Madhopur, Alwar, Dhaulpur, the Tonk region and Jaipur have had a history of Hela Khayal. The most famous center was Lalsot in Dausa which organised the biggest competition of Hela Khayal, where the performers considered participation to be prestigious.

The Hela Khayal Dangals were generally planned to take place over two to three days. They were organized by villages at the community level. After harvesting, the peasants would have some money after selling the crops. All the families of villages would contribute in cash or kind for the event. The artists were sent out invitations. With collected funds, the organizing team of the village would arrange for the food and other necessities of the artists of the invited troupes.

Most villages in Rajasthan have an open community area where people can sit and socialize. In the night, the artists would practice for their performances in this area. The practice sessions are called Raggi. Hela Khayal is not only considered a cultural heritage but also a confluence of Hadauti and Dhundhadi culture.

== Performance ==
Hela Khayal is a medium through which a singer presents any religious, mythological, social or political subject in versified form for the audience. It starts with Bhawani Pujan – invoking the blessings of gods and goddesses. Then couplets called doha are sung. The artists of every troupe range from 20 to 40. They are usually divided into two groups. One group is stands near the Nagada which is a drum-like folk instrument that gives beat. The other group stands between the audience and sings. One khayal is one unified lyrical composition that may be performed in two parts, taking a short break in between.

Folk instruments used for Hela Khayal are Dholak, Nagada, Manjira, Harmonium, Jhanjh, Khanjari, Chimta etc. Before beginning the singing performance, sometimes the artists play the instruments and perform a folk dance. This is called Baja Milana. Only male artists perform in Hela Khayal. At the end of a performance by a troupe, a challenging question is posed to the next troupe. It is expected to reply in the style of Hela Khayal.

== Content and style ==
The singing of Hela Khayal is divided based on style such as Doha, Barahmasi, Filmy etc. It has both regional variations as well as variations according to the style of singers. Typically, every composition also has the name of its composer at the end. Lyricists like late Gopilal Joshi, Pyarelal Joshi, Srinarayan, Gaindalal Karigar, Mathuresh Joshi, Kalyan Prasad Mishra, Roshan Teli, Matadin Joshi, Kalicharan, Pt. Devkinandan, Hukamchand, Radharaman, Rampratap, Devisingh Chowdhary, Rambilas have earned fame in the field. A book has been compiled with the compositions of Lalaram.

Hela compositions have critiqued social evils like dowry, child marriages, caste discrimination, illiteracy, and comment on political events. The political satires were called Turra and Kalangi. Earlier in Dangal, discussions of mythology and religion dominated the content although songs of Turra and Kalangi were also popular. In more recent times, commentaries on political and social subjects dominate the Dangal performances. Singers present musical compositions about patriotism, decline in the political field of the country, degradation of moral values including corruption, terrorism, and other social and political issues. There is no special stage and the audience sit on all three sides of the performers. The folk theatre form of Hela Khayal Dangal is an opportunity for the artists to express the sentiments of the public in an entertaining manner regarding various pertinent issues while also appealing to the people to be progressive and stand against social evils.
