= Dashavatara =

Ten major avatars of the Hindu god Vishnu

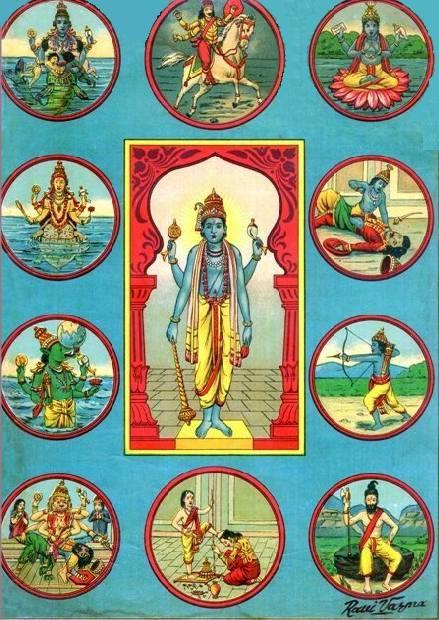
Hindu god Vishnu (centre) surrounded by his ten major avatars (Krishna-Buddha version). Anticlockwise from top left: Matsya; Kurma; Varaha; Narasimha; Vamana; Parashurama; Rama; Krishna; Buddha and Kalki

The Dashavatara (Sanskrit: दशावतार, IAST: daśāvatāra) are the ten primary avatars of Vishnu, a principal Hindu god. Vishnu is said to descend in the form of an avatar to restore cosmic order. The word Dashavatara derives from daśa, meaning "ten", and avatāra, roughly equivalent to "incarnation".

The list of included avatars varies across sects and regions, particularly with respect to the inclusion of Balarama (brother of Krishna) or the Buddha. Though no list can be uncontroversially presented as standard, the "most accepted list found in Puranas and other texts is [...] Krishna, Buddha." (Note: Buddha as an avatar of Vishnu: Krishna, Buddha Printed sources: Bansal, Sunita Pant, Hindu Gods and Goddesses, p.27, "Vishnu Dashavatara"; Dalal 2010, p. 112 "Dashavatara" Dalal: "The standard and most accepted list found in Puranas and other texts is: [...] Rama, Krishna, Buddha, Kalki"; Doniger O'Flaherty 1994, p. 175 Doniger: "Visnu is generally said to have had ten incarnations [...] Krsna [...] the Buddha."; Flood 1996, p. 116 Flood: "...by the eight century the standard number of descent-forms in the Vaisnava Puranas is ten. These are [...] Krsna, Buddha."; Klostermaier 2007, "Visnu Avataras" Klostermaier: "The most common tradition speaks of ten such avataras [...] Krsna [...] Buddha."; Krishna 2010, pp. 28–29 Krishna: "Krishna [...] Buddha [...] There is a difference of opinion as to whether Buddha was an incarnation of Vishnu [...] The alternative then is Balarama, Rama of the plough and elder brother of Krishna, who is listed after Rama, thereby removing Buddha and making Krishna the ninth incarnation."; Leeming, David Adams, A Dictionary of Asian Mythology, p. 19, "Avatar"; Lochtefeld 2001, p. 73 "Avatar" Lochtefeld: "Although there is some variation in the list of Vishnu's Avatars, the generally accepted list is as follows [...] Krishna, Buddha."; Vaswani 2017, pp. 12–14; Wuaku 2013, p. 148; Balarama, Buddha: Nagaswamy 2010, p. 27; Web-sources: Encyclopedia Britannica, Avatar; Unspecified: Holt, John Clifford (2008), The Buddhist Viṣṇu: Religious Transformation, Politics, and Culture, p.14-15; p.372 note 9 refers to four Puranas which mention the Buddha in 9th position: Varaha Purana 4.2; Matsya Purana 285.6-7; Agni Purana 49.8; Bhagavata Purana X.40.22 and I.3.; Krishna/Balarama, Buddha: The Hare Krsnas, Incarnations of the Lord - Dasavatara - Ten Primary Visnu Incarnations. The Hare Krsnas refer to the eight avatar both as Krsna and as Balarama.) Most draw from the following set of figures, in this order: Matsya, Kurma, Varaha, Narasimha, Vamana, Parashurama, Rama, Krishna or Balarama, Buddha or Krishna, and Kalki. In traditions that omit Krishna, he often replaces Vishnu as the source of all avatars. Some traditions include a regional deity such as Vithoba or Jagannath in penultimate position, replacing Krishna or Buddha. All avatars have appeared except one: Kalki, who will appear at the end of the Kali Yuga.

The order of the ancient concept of Dashavataras has also been interpreted to be reflective of modern Darwinian evolution, as a description of the evolution of consciousness.

== Etymology ==
"Dashavatara" or "daśāvatāra" (दशावतार) means "ten avatars" or "ten incarnations":

- "Dash" or "Daśā" (दश) means "ten"
- "Avatara" (अवतार) means "incarnation"

== List of Avatars ==
According to Swami Parmeshwaranand, although the avatars of Vishnu are countless in number and include hermits, Manus, sons of Manus, and other Devas (Hindu Deity), due to a curse by the Rishi Bhrigu, most are only partial (i.e. incomplete) incarnations. The Dashavatara is a list of the ten complete (i.e., full) incarnations.

=== Lists ===
Various versions of the list of Vishnu's avatars exist, varying by region and tradition. Some lists mention Krishna as the eighth avatar and the Buddha as the ninth avatar, while others, such as the Paripāṭal (c. 3rd-4th CE), which is the fifth of the Eight Anthologies (Ettuthokai) in the Sangam literature, and the Yatindramatadipika, a 17th-century summary of Sri Vaishnava doctrine, list Balarama as the eighth avatar and Krishna as the ninth. The latter version is followed by some Vaishnavas who do not accept the Buddha as an incarnation of Vishnu. One list in the Mahabharata gives Rama (Bhargava), Rama (Dasharathi), Satvata (Krishna or Balarama), the Tri-Rama. The Tantric Prapanchasara (attributed to Adi Shankara, but disputed,) also omits the Buddha. Though no list can be uncontroversially presented as standard, the "most accepted list found in Puranas and other texts is [...] Krishna, Buddha."

The following table summarises the position of avatars within the Dashavatara in many but not all traditions:

| Position | Krishna, Buddha North Indian Bhagavatism, Sadh Vaishnavism, ISKCON (Note: The Hare Krsnas, Incarnations of the Lord - Dasavatara - Ten Primary Visnu Incarnations. The Hare Krsnas refer to the eight avatar both as Krsna and as Balarama.) (Note: (Leyden 1982, p. 22): Madhya Pradesh, Maharashtra.) | Balarama, Krishna Smartism, Shaiva Siddhanta, Sri Vaishnavism (Note: (Leyden 1982, p. 22): Southern Deccan, Mysore.) | Balarama, Buddha Gaudiya Vaishnavism, ISKCON (Note: (Leyden 1982, p. 22): Rajasthan, Nepal, Northern Deccan.) | Balarama, Jagannatha Govardhan Math (Note: prabhat Mukherjee: Orissa; Leyden: West Bengal Orissa.) | Krishna, Vithoba Warkari Sampradaya (Note: Maharashtra, Goa.) | Yuga |
| 1 | Matsya (fish) | | | | | Satya Yuga |
| 2 | Kurma (turtle, tortoise) | | | | | Satya Yuga |
| 3 | Varaha (boar) | | | | | Satya Yuga |
| 4 | Narasimha (man-lion) | | | | | Satya Yuga |
| 5 | Vamana (dwarf-god) | | | | | Treta Yuga |
| 6 | Parashurama (Brahmin warrior) | | | | | Treta Yuga |
| 7 | Rama (Note: Donald J. LaRocca, Metropolitan Museum of Art, describes a katar with Rama-Krishna-Buddha, referring to Rama as Ramachandra, or alternately Balarama. Yet, Hoiberg specifically states that Rama, as an avatar of Vishnu, is Ramachandra.) | | | | | Treta Yuga |
| 8 | Krishna | Balarama | Balarama | Balarama | Krishna | Dvapara Yuga, Kali Yuga in case of Buddha |
| 9 | Buddha | Krishna | Buddha | Jagannatha | Buddha coalescedVithoba | Dvapara Yuga, Kali Yuga in case of Buddha |
| 10 | Kalki (prophesied 10th avatar who ends the Kali Yuga) | | | | | Kali Yuga |

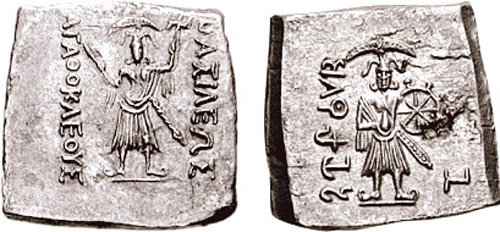
Balarama-Samkarshana, holding the gada and plough, and Vasudeva-Krishna, holding the sankha (a conch) and chakra, the half-brother avatars of Vishnu, are the earliest representations of avatars. Mint from the coinage of the non-Hindu Agathocles, an Indo-Greek ruler, circa 185-170 BCE

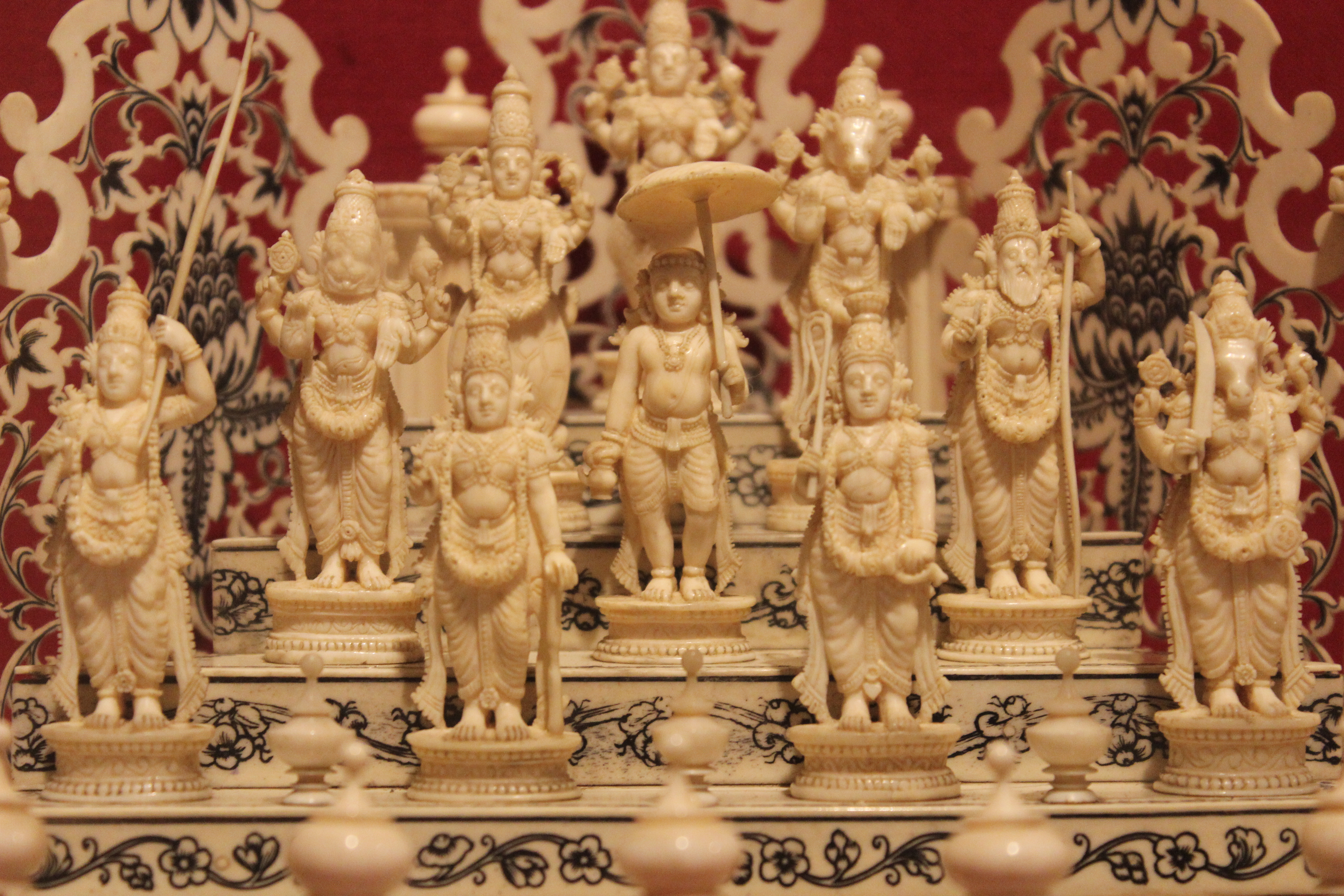
Hindu god Vishnu's ten major avatars (Balarama-Krishna version) Dasavatara shrine, 18th century ivory (National Museum, New Delhi). From top descending: Matsya; Kurma; Varaha; Narasimha; Vamana; Parashurama; Rama; Balarama ; Krishna and Kalki.

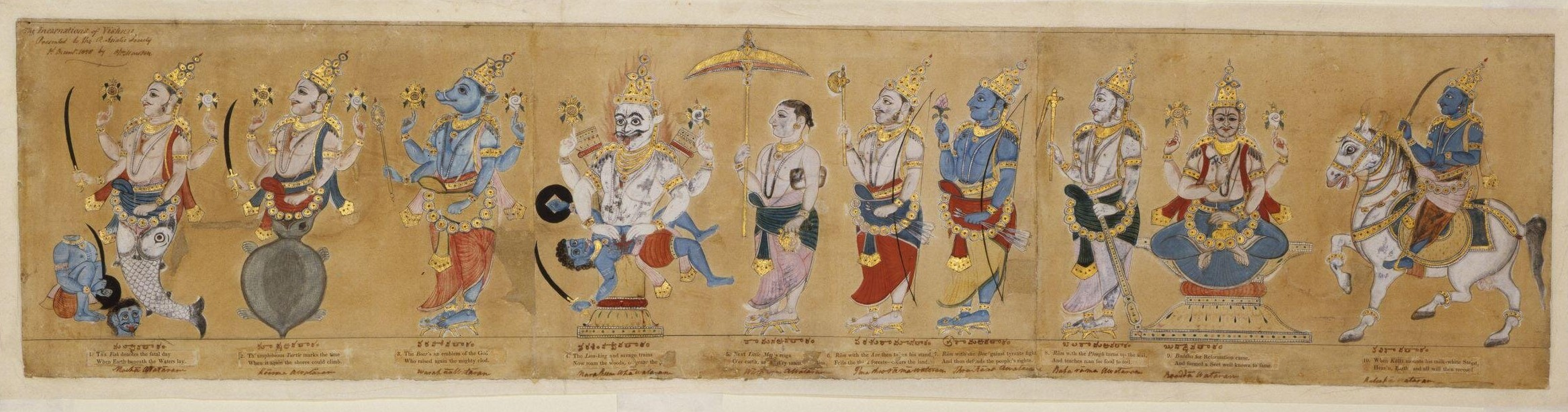
Hindu god Vishnu's ten major avatars (Balarama-Buddha version). From left: Matsya; Kurma; Varaha; Narasimha; Vamana; Parashurama; Rama; Balarama; Buddha; and Kalki

=== In the Puranas ===
The Agni, Padma, Garuda, Linga, Narada, Skanda and Varaha Puranas mention the common (Krishna, Buddha) Dashavatara list. (Note: In the Puranas: Agni, Chapter 49; Garuda (list 1), Volume 1, Chapter 86, Verses 10–11 (one of two lists); Linga, Part 2, Chapter 48, Verses 31-32; Narada, Part 4, Chapter 119, Verses 14–19; Padma, Part 7: 66.44–54; 71.23–29; Part 9: 229.40–44; Varaha, Chapter 4, Verses 2-3; Chapter 48, Verses 17–22; and Chapter 211, Verse 69; Skanda, Part 15: Reva Khanda: Chapter 151, Verses 1–7) The Garuda Purana has two lists, one longer list with Krishna and Buddha, and a list with Balarama and Buddha, which substitutes Vamana for Rama. (Note: Garuda list 2, Volume 3, Chapter 30, Verse 37) The Shiva Purana has Balarama and Krishna. The list with Krishna and Buddha is also found in the Garuda Purana Saroddhara, a commentary or 'extracted essence' of the Garuda Purana (i.e. not the Purana itself, with which it seems to be confused):

The Fish, the Tortoise, the Boar, the Man-Lion, the Dwarf, Parasurama, Rama, Krisna, Buddha, and also Kalki: These ten names should always be meditated upon by the wise. Those who recite them near the diseased are called relatives.

— Garuda Purana Saroddhara by Navanidhirama (translated by E. Wood and S. V. Subrahmanyam), Chapter VIII, Verses 10–11

== Description of the avatars ==
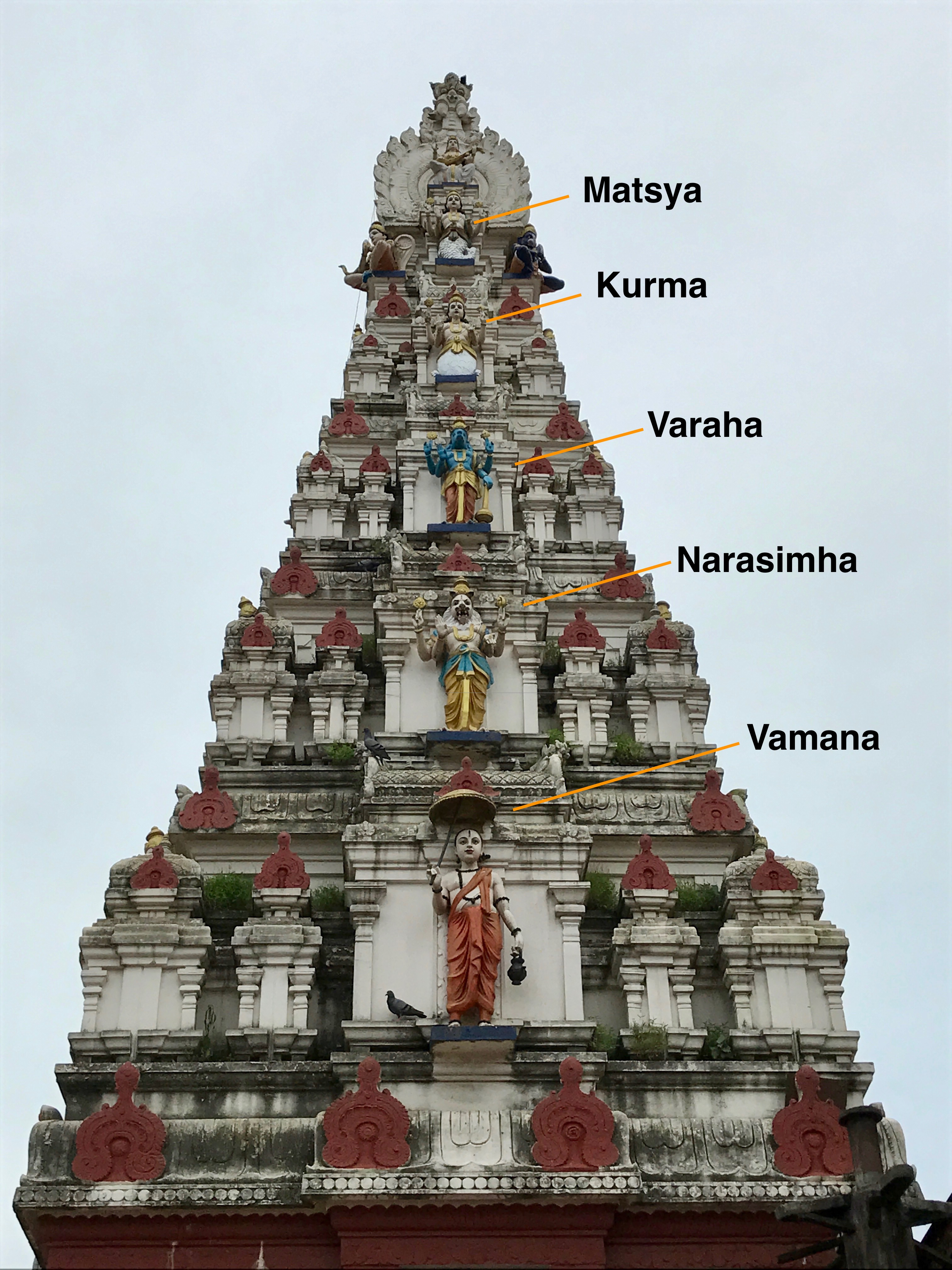
1st to 5th of the Dashavataras on Udupi Sri Krishna Matha gopuram, Karnataka.

1. Matsya: The fish avatar. King Vaivasvata Manu finds a little fish in the palm of his hands when performing the tarpana (water-offering). The fish asks Manu if his riches and power was enough to give the fish a nice home. Manu keeps the fish to give it a home, but the fish keeps expanding, which breaks Manu's pride about his wealth. Eventually, he releases it into the ocean, realizing it is Vishnu himself. Vishnu informs Manu of the coming destruction of the world, by means of fires and floods, and directs Manu to collect "all creatures of the world" and keep them safe on a boat built by the gods. When the deluge (Pralaya) occurs, Vishnu appears as a great fish with a horn, to which Manu ties the boat, which leads them into safety.
2. Kurma: The tortoise/turtle avatar. In the legend of the Samudra Manthana, the devas and asuras were churning the Ocean of Milk in order to obtain amrita, the nectar of immortality. They used the mountain Mandara as the churning shaft, which started to sink. Vishnu took the form of a tortoise to bear the weight of the mountain to allow them to complete their task.
3. Varaha: The boar avatar. The gatekeepers of Vaikuntha, the abode of Vishnu, Jaya and Vijaya, are cursed by the Four Kumaras when they stop them from seeing Vishnu. They choose to be reborn three times as asuras as adversaries of Vishnu. In their first birth, they are born as the brothers Hiranyaksha and Hiranyakashipu. Varaha appeared to defeat Hiranyaksha, who had abducted the earth, and by extension the earth goddess, Bhumi, and carried it to the bottom of the cosmic ocean. The battle between Varaha and Hiranyaksha is believed to have lasted for a thousand years, which the former finally won. Varaha carried the earth out of the ocean between his tusks and restored it to its place in the universe.
4. Narasimha: The half-man/half-lion avatar. Hiranyakashipu persecuted everyone for their religious beliefs including his son, Prahlada, who was a devotee of Vishnu. The boy was protected by the god and could not be killed, thus being saved by the several attempts of getting harmed. Vishnu descended as an anthropomorphic incarnation, with the body of a man and head and claws of a lion. He disemboweled Hiranyakashipu, and brought an end to the persecution of human beings, including his devotee Prahlada.
5. Vamana: The dwarf avatar. The grandson of Prahlada, Bali, with devotion and penance was able to defeat Indra, the king of heaven. This humbled the other deities and extended his authority over the three worlds. The gods appealed to Vishnu for protection and he descended as a boy Vamana. During a yajna of the king, Vamana approached him and Bali promised him for whatever he asked. Vamana asked for three paces of land. Bali agreed, and the dwarf then changed his size to that of the giant Trivikrama form. With his first stride he covered the earthly realm, with the second he covered the heavenly realm thereby symbolically covering the abode of all living beings. He then took the third stride for the netherworld. Bali realized that Vamana was Vishnu incarnate. In deference, the king offered his head as the third place for Vamana to place his foot. The avatar did so and thus granted Bali immortality, making him ruler of Pathala, the netherworld. Vishnu also granted Bali a boon (a divine blessing) whereby he could return to earth every year. The harvest festivals of Balipratipada and Onam (which is mostly celebrated by people of all faiths within Kerala) are celebrated to mark his yearly homecoming. This legend appears in hymn 1.154 of the Rigveda and other Vedic as well as Puranic texts.
6. Parashurama: The warrior avatar. He is the son of Jamadagni and Renuka and was granted as a boon, an axe after a penance to Shiva. Once, the king Kartavirya Arjuna and his hunting party halted at the ashrama of Jamadagni, the father of Parashurama. The sage was able to feed them all with the aid of the divine cow Kamadhenu. The king demanded the cow, but Jamadagni refused. Enraged, the king took it by force and destroyed the ashrama and left along with the cow. Parashurama then killed the king at his palace and destroyed his army. In revenge, the sons of Kartavirya killed Jamadagni. Parashurama took a vow to travel across the world twenty-one times and kill every kshatriya king on earth filled five lakes with their blood. Ultimately, his grandfather, the rishi Ricika, appeared before him and made him halt. He is a chiranjivi (immortal), and believed to be alive today in penance at Mahendragiri. He is also credited with creating the coastal belt of Karnataka and Kerala by throwing his mighty axe as per Hindu mythology. The place the axe landed in the sea got its water displaced and the land which emerged thus came to be known as the coast of Karnataka and whole of Kerala.
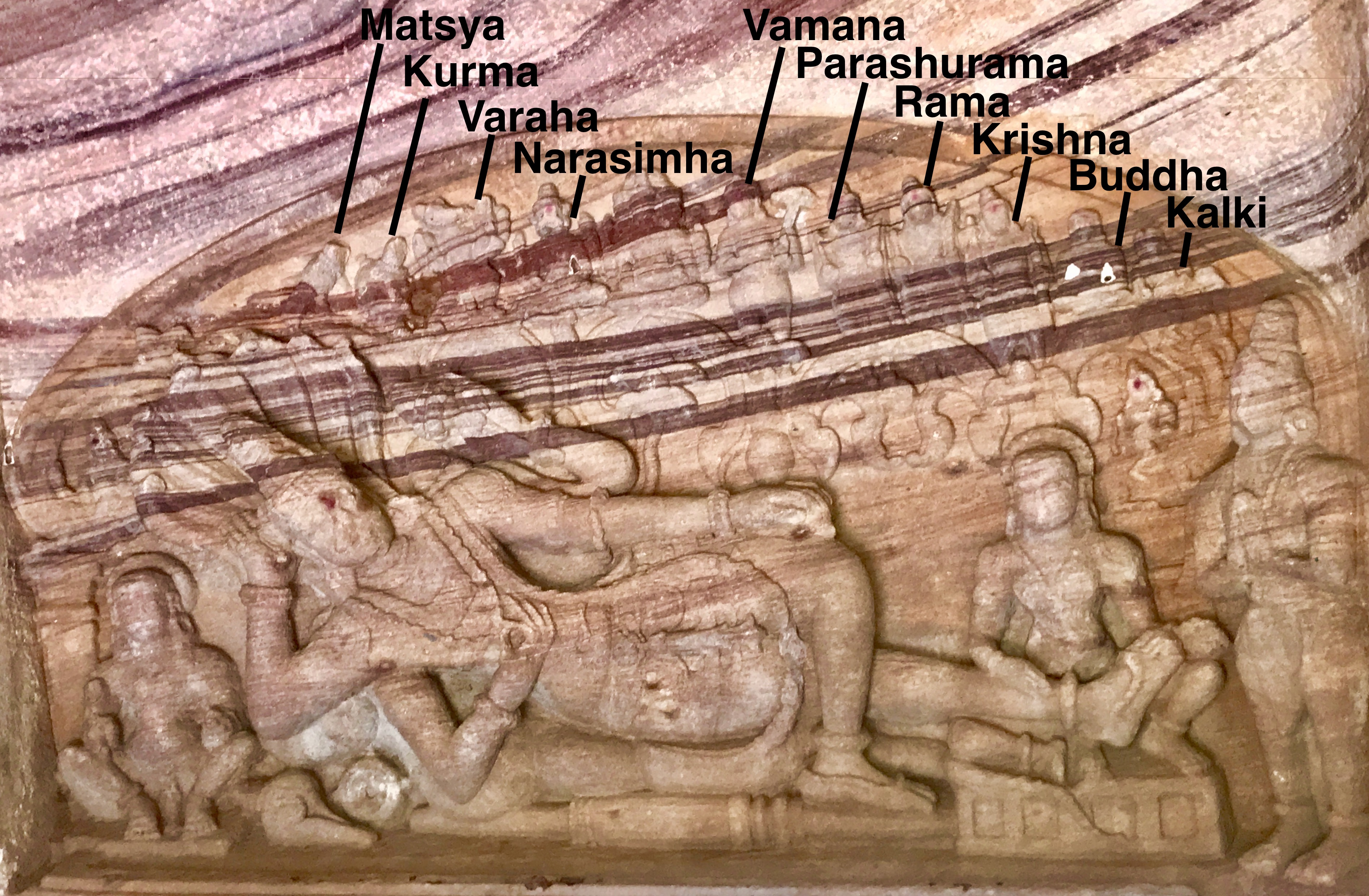
  Anantashayana Vishnu with Lakshmi, his ten avatars above him (annotated), 6th – 8th century Badami, Karnataka
7. Rama: The King of Ayodhya. He is a commonly worshipped avatar in Hinduism, and is thought of as the ideal man, and the embodiment of righteousness. His story is recounted in one of the most widely read scriptures of Hinduism, the Ramayana. While in exile from his own kingdom with his brother Lakshmana and wife Sita, she was abducted by Ravana, a rakshasa and king of Lanka. Rama travelled to Lanka, killed Ravana and saved Sita. Rama and Sita returned home and were crowned. The day of the return of Prince Rama to the kingdom of Ayodhya is celebrated in the festival of Diwali all over India.
8. Krishna (sometimes at 9 or "0") or Balarama:
  - Krishna was the eighth son of Devaki and Vasudeva and the foster-son of Yashoda and Nanda. A frequently worshipped deity in Hinduism, he is born to slay his tyrannical uncle, Kamsa. He is a major protagonist of the Mahabharata, most notably featured in his role as the charioteer of Arjuna in the Kurukshetra War. He embodies several qualities such as love, duty, compassion, and playfulness. Krishna's birthday is celebrated every year by Hindus on Krishna Janmashtami according to the lunisolar Hindu calendar, which falls in late August or early September of the Gregorian calendar. Krishna is usually depicted with a flute in his hand. Krishna is also a central character in Mahabharata, Bhagavata Purana, and the Bhagavad Gita.
  - Balarama, the elder brother of Krishna, is regarded generally as an avatar of Shesha an extension of Ananta, a form of Vishnu. Balarama is included as the eighth avatar of Vishnu in the Sri Vaishnava lists, where Buddha is omitted and Krishna appears as the ninth avatar in this list. He is particularly included in the lists where Krishna is removed.
9. Buddha; sometimes Krishna, (sometimes at 8 or "0"), Vithoba, or Jagannath.
  - Gautama Buddha, the founder of Buddhism, is commonly included as an avatar of Vishnu in Hinduism. Buddha is sometimes depicted in Hindu scriptures as a preacher who deludes and leads asuras and heretics away from the path of the Vedic scriptures, but another view praises him a compassionate teacher who preached the path of ahimsa (non-violence).
  - Krishna; commonly at 8, sometimes at "0"
  - In Maharashtra and Goa, Vithoba's image replaces Buddha as the ninth avatar of Vishnu in some temple sculptures and Hindu astrological almanacs.
  - In certain Odia literary creations from Odisha, Jagannath has been treated as the Ninth avatar, by substituting Buddha.
10. Kalki: The final incarnation of Vishnu, who appears at the end of each Kali Yuga. He will be atop a white horse and his sword will be drawn, blazing like a comet. He appears when only chaos, evil and persecution prevails, dharma has vanished, and he ends the Kali Yuga to restart the Satya Yuga and another cycle of existence.

== Historical development ==
Vishnu Dashavatara inscription

Matsyah Kurmo Varahas-cha Narasimhas-cha Vamana
Ramo Ramas-cha Ramas-cha Buddha Kalki-cha te dasa

The Fish, the Tortoise, the Boar, the Man-lion, the Dwarf,
Parasurama, Dasarathi Rama, Balarama, Buddha, and Kalki – thy ten.

— Sanctum entrance, Adivaraha cave (7th century), Mahabalipuram;
earliest avatar-related epigraphy (Note: This 7th century (or early 8th century) inscription is significant for several reasons. It is the earliest known stone inscription about the ten avatars of Vishnu, and prior to that they are found in older texts. The stone inscription mentions the Buddha as an avatar of Vishnu in a Hindu temple. It also does not mention Krishna, but Balarama consistent with old Hindu and Jain texts of South India, the former equating Krishna to be identical to Vishnu.)

=== Buddha ===
The Buddha was included as one of the avatars of Vishnu under Bhagavatism by the Gupta period between 330 and 550 CE. The mythologies of the Buddha in the Theravada tradition and of Vishnu in Hinduism share a number of structural and substantial similarities. For example, states Indologist John Holt, the Theravada cosmogony and cosmology states the Buddha covered 6,800,000 yojanas in three strides, including earth to heaven and then placed his right foot over Yugandhara – a legend that parallels that of the Vamana avatar in Hinduism. Similarly, the Buddha is claimed in the Theravada mythology to have been born when dharma is in decline, so as to preserve and uphold the dharma. These similarities may have contributed to the assimilation of the Buddha as an avatar of Vishnu.

The adoption of Buddha as an avatar in Bhagavatism was a catalyzing factor in Buddhism's assimilation into Vaishnavism's mythic hierarchy. By the 8th century CE, the Buddha was included as an avatar of Vishnu in several Puranas. This assimilation is indicative of the Hindu ambivalence toward the Buddha and Buddhism, and there is also a tradition that there were two Buddhas. According to this tradition, the first was the ninth avatar of Vishnu, while the second was the historical Buddha. (Note: Some contemporary Hindus also argue that there were two Buddhas, a Puranic Buddha mentioned in Bhagavata Purana 1.3.24 who was the incarnation of Vishnu, and the historical Buddha, who according to them was not an incarnation of Vishna. They also argue that sugata is not an ephitet for Gautama Buddha, and that "Sugata Buddha" refers to the Buddha-avatar of Vishnu or "Adi Buddha". In this view, Sugata Buddha or Adi Buddha and Gautama Buddha were two different persons. See also A Joint Declaration: Buddha Is NOT an Avatar of Vishnu.) Conversely, Vishnu has also been assimilated into Sinhalese Buddhist culture, and Mahayana Buddhism is sometimes called Buddha-Bhagavatism. By this period, the concept of Dashavatara was fully developed.

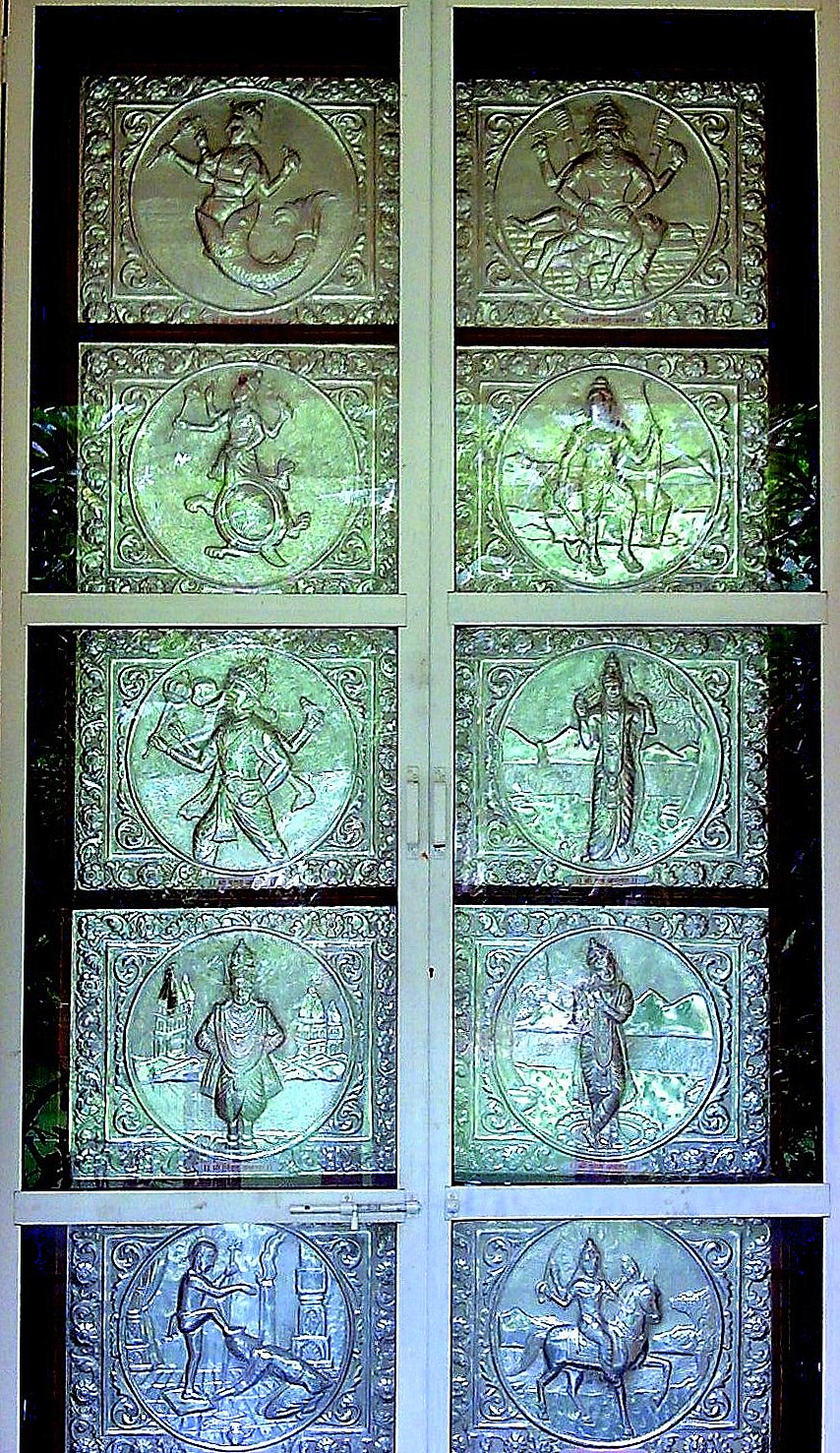
Temple door depicting Dashavatar with Vithoba, at Sree Balaji Temple, Goa. From left top to bottom, Matsya, Kurma, Varaha, Vithoba, Vamana. From right top to bottom, Narasimha, Parashurama, Rama, Krishna, and Kalki. Vithoba replaces Buddha in this carving.

=== Krishna ===
Jayadeva, in his Pralaya Payodhi Jale from the Gita Govinda, includes Balarama and Buddha where Krishna is equated with Vishnu and the source of all avatars. The words from the poem describing ten avataras (translated) are as follows:

As a reviver of Vedas as a fish, bearer of this earth as tortoise, uplifter and supporter of earth as wild boar, slasher of Hiranyakashyapa as lion man, deluder of Bali as dwarf boy, annihilator of Kshatriya s as Parashu Rama, conqueror of Ravana, the legatee of Paulastya, as Rama, wielder of plough as bala raama, fosterer of non violence as Buddha, mangler of fractious races as Kalki, you alone can put on ten semblances, thus oh, Krishna, my reverences are unto you.

In traditions that emphasize the Bhagavata Purana, Krishna is the original Supreme Personality of Godhead, from whom everything else emanates. Gaudiya Vaishnavas worship Krishna as Svayam Bhagavan, or source of the incarnations. The Vallabha Sampradaya and Nimbarka Sampradaya, (philosophical schools) go even further, worshiping Krishna not only as the source of other incarnations, but also Vishnu himself, related to descriptions in the Bhagavata Purana. The Mahanubhavas, also known as the Jai Kishani Panth, consider Krishna as the supreme God and do not consider the list of Dashavatara, but instead, they consider another list of Panchavatara (5 Avatars).

Thirty-nine avatars are mentioned in the Pañcaratra including the likes of Garuda. However, despite these lists, the commonly accepted number of ten avatars for Vishnu was fixed well before the 10th century CE.

== Jyotisha interpretation ==
The term "Jyotisha" refers to Hindu or Vedic astrology, one of the six Vedangas or ancillary disciplines linked with the Vedas. The Brihat Parasara Hora Sastra mentions the Dashavatara as follows:

From the Sun God the Incarnation of Rama, from the Moon that of Krishna, from Mars that of Narasimha, from Mercury that of Buddha, from Jupiter that of Vamana, from Venus that of Parasurama, from Saturn that of Koorma (Tortoise), from Rahu that of Varaha [Boar] and from Ketu that of [Matsya] (fish) occurred. All other incarnations that these are through the Grahas. The beings with more Paramatmamsa [i.e. Rama, Krishna, Narasimha and Varaha] are called divine beings'.

— Brihat Parasara Hora Sastra, Translated by R. Santhanam (1984), Chapter 2, Verses 5-7

Notably, according to the Brihat Parasara Hora Sastra - an important Smriti Sastra or compilation of Indian astrology for prediction (i.e. fortune telling) - although all ten of the Dashavatara have corresponding astrological symbols, only four are considered as divine beings (i.e. Rama, Krishna, Narasimha and Varaha).

The sun is the soul of all. The Moon is the mind. Mars is one's strength. Mercury is speech-giver while Jupiter confers knowledge and happiness. Venus governs semen (potency) while Saturn denotes grief.

Of royal status are the Sun and the Moon while Mars is the army chief. Prince-apparent in Mercury. The ministerial planets are Jupiter and Venus. Saturn is servant. Rahu and Ketu form the planetary army.

— Brihat Parasara Hora Sastra, Translated by R. Santhanam (1984), Chapter 3, Verses 12-15

== Evolutionary interpretation ==
Some modern interpreters interpret Vishnu's ten main avatars as an ascending order from simple life-forms to more complex life-forms, and see the Dashavataras as a reflection, or a foreshadowing, of the modern theory of evolution. Such an interpretation was first propounded by the Gaudiya Vaishnava saint Bhaktivinoda Thakur in his 1873 book Datta-kaustubha and again in his 1880 book Kṛṣṇa-saṁhita. Theosophist Helena Blavatsky also reiterated this in her 1877 opus Isis Unveiled. Bhaktivinoda Thakura proposed the following ordering of the Dashavataras:

- Matsya - fish (Paleozoic era)
- Kurma - amphibious tortoise (Mesozoic era)
- Varaha - boar (Cenozoic era)
- Narasimha - man-lion, the last animal and semi-human avatar (Cenozoic era)
- Vamana - growing dwarf and first step towards the human form
- Parashurama - an early man who started using primitive weapons like Axe
- Rama - an ideal hero, physically perfect, befriends a speaking vanara deity Hanuman
- Krishna - Vishnu incarnating as a God
- Buddha - the founder of Buddhism, an enlightened man
- Kalki - the next step in evolution; yet to happen and the savior, and is like Christian Advent, which Madame Blavatsky believed Christians "undoubtedly copied from the Hindus"

Blavatsky believed that the avatara-related Hindu texts were an allegorical presentation of Darwinian evolution. Some Orientalists and reformist Hindus in India picked up this idea to rationalize Hinduism as being consistent with modern science. Keshub Chandra Sen (Note: Sen was a leader of the colonial era monotheistic Brahmo Samaj reform movement of Hinduism that adopted ideas from Christianity and Islam.) stated in 1882,

The Puranas speak of the different manifestations or incarnations of the Deity in different epochs of the world history. Lo! The Hindu Avatar rises from the lowest scale of life through the fish, the tortoise, and the hog up to the perfection of humanity. Indian Avatarism is, indeed, a crude representation of the ascending scale of Divine creation. Such precisely is the modern theory of evolution.

Similarly Aurobindo regarded "Avataric Evolutionism" as a "parable of evolution", one which does not endorse evolutionism, but hints at "transformative phases of spiritual progress". According to Nanda, the Dashavatara concept has led to some Hindus asserting that their religion is more open to scientific theories, and has not opposed or persecuted scientists midst them like the way Christianity and Islam has. But, adds Nanda, Hinduism has many cosmological theories and even the Vaishnava one with Dashavatara concept does not explicitly teach evolution of species, rather it states an endless cycles of creationism.

The Dashavatara concept appealed to other scholars. Monier Monier-Williams wrote "Indeed, the Hindus were ... Darwinians centuries before the birth of Darwin, and evolutionists centuries before the doctrine of evolution had been accepted by the Huxleys of our time, and before any word like evolution existed in any language of the world." J. B. S. Haldane (British-Indian scientist) suggested that Dashavatara gave a "rough idea" of vertebrate evolution: a fish, a tortoise, a boar, a man-lion, a dwarf and then four men (Kalki is not yet born). Nabinchandra Sen explains the Dashavatara with Darwin's evolution in his Raivatak. C. D. Deshmukh also remarked on the "striking" similarity between Darwin's theory and the Dashavatara.

Some Vaishnava Hindus reject this "Avataric Evolutionism" concept. For example, Prakashanand states that this apologeticism degrades the divine status of Rama and Krishna, unduly sequences Rama as inferior to Krishna and both to the Buddha. Rama and Krishna are supremely divine, each right and perfect for the circumstances they appeared in, states Prakashanand.

== Notes ==
Subnotes

== Sources ==
- Almond, Philip C. (1988), The British Discovery of Buddhism, Cambridge University Press
- Avalon, Arthur (1935). Tantrik Texts Prapancha Sara Tantra Vol. XVIII. Arthur Avalon.
- Carman, John Braisted (1994), Majesty and Meekness: A Comparative Study of Contrast and Harmony in the Concept of God, Wm. B. Eerdmans Publishing
- Dalal, Roshen (2010), Hinduism: An Alphabetical Guide, Penguin Books India, ISBN 9780143414216
- Doniger O'Flaherty, Wendy (1994), Hindu Myths, Penguin Books India, ISBN 9780144000111
- Flood, Gavin D. (1996), An Introduction to Hinduism, Cambridge University Press, ISBN 978-0-521-43878-0
- Hoiberg, Dale (2000), Students' Britannica India: M to S : (Miraj to Shastri) - Volume 4, Popular Prakashan, ISBN 9780852297605
- Holt, John C. (2013), The Buddhist Visnu: Religious Transformation, Politics, and Culture, Columbia University Press, ISBN 978-02311-3-3234
- Klostermaier, Klaus K. (2007), Hinduism: A Beginner's Guide, Oneworld Publications
- Krishna, Nanditha (2009), Book of Vishnu, Penguin UK, ISBN 978-01430-6-7627
- Krishna, Nanditha (2010), The Book of Vishnu, Penguin Books India, ISBN 9780143067627
- LaRocca, Donald J. (1996), The Gods of War: Sacred Imagery and the Decoration of Arms and Armor, Metropolitan Museum of Art
- Leyden, Rudolf von (1982), Ganjifa: The Playing Cards of India, The Victoria and Albert Museum, ISBN 978-09052-0-9173
- Lochtefeld, James G. (2001), The Illustrated Encyclopedia of Hinduism. Volume 1: A-M, The Rosen Publishing Group, Inc, ISBN 9780823931798
- Morgan, Kenneth W. (1987). The Religion of the Hindus. Motilal Banarsidass. ISBN 978-81-208-0387-9.
- Mukherjee, Prabhat (1981), The history of medieval Vaishnavism in Orissa, Asian Educational Services, ISBN 9788120602298
- Nagaswamy, N. (2010), Mahabalipuram (Mamallapuram), Oxford University Press
- Sullivan, Bruce M. (2001), The A to Z of Hinduism, 2nd Edition, Scarecrow Press, ISBN 978-08108-4-0706
- Vaswani, J.P. (2017), Dasavatara, Jaico Publishing House, ISBN 9789386867186
- Wuaku, Albert (11 July 2013). Hindu Gods in West Africa: Ghanaian Devotees of Shiva and Krishna. BRILL. ISBN 978-90-04-25571-5.
