= Marathi Keertan =

Art of spiritual teaching through story-telling

Marathi Kirtan or Kirtan is a form of spiritual teaching conveyed through story-telling. It is typically performed by one or two main performers, known as keertankars, and is accompanied by musicians playing the harmonium, castanets/chiplya/kartal/khartal, manjeera/taal/jhaanj/cymbals, tambori, mridang/pakhawaj, and tabla. The performance incorporates singing, acting, dancing, and narrative elements. It is regarded as a devotional art form that focuses on the glorification of God and divine acts.

Based on performance structure and thematic elements, Kirtan has been classified into several types, which are described in the sections below.

== Origin ==
In Indian mythology, the story of Bhakta Prahlad is known for the unwavering devotion of a young child toward the almighty God, despite the obstacles created by his father, the demon king Hiranyakashipu. In the same avatar katha (story of the avatar), Prahlad describes nine types of bhakti (devotion). The relevant shloka states:

Śravaṇaṃ kīrtanaṃ viṣṇoḥ smaraṇaṃ pāda-sevanaṃ |
Arcanaṃ vandanaṃ dāsyaṃ sakhyam ātma-nivedanam ||

The verse outlines nine types of bhakti, or ways of devotion:

- Śravaṇam – Listening to stories of God or divine virtues.
- Kīrtanam – Singing or praising God and goodness.
- Smaraṇam – Remembering God and divine qualities.
- Pāda-sevanam – Serving holy places or engaging in sacred service.
- Arcanaṃ – Performing puja or offering decoration and honour to God and virtuous individuals.
- Vandanam – Bowing or offering respect to the divine.
- Dāsyam – Rendering selfless service to God.
- Sakhyam – Forming a bond of friendship with God without material expectations.
- Ātma-nivedanam – Offering oneself completely to God.

The second type, kīrtanam or kirtan, refers to the performing art of presenting teachings from sacred texts and mythological literature, often accompanied by music, gesture, humour, and narrative techniques. Historically, due to limited means of transportation and communication, performers—known as keertankars—travelled extensively from town to town, offering performances intended to educate and inspire people. Kirtan continues to be practised across India in various forms, particularly in temples, gurudwaras, mandirs, and at religious gatherings.

Kirtan is also known by names such as Hari kirtan, katha or harikatha, sankirtan, and nam sankeertan. It is regarded as an ancient tradition associated with the sage Narada, considered a devoted follower of Vishnu. Naradiya kirtan follows a format attributed to Narada, described as the divine son of Brahma.

== Naradiya Keertan ==
Naradiya Keertan (or Naradiya Kirtan) is an age-old devotional tradition centred on praising deities, recounting divine acts, and conveying moral and spiritual teachings. It serves both as a form of worship and as a medium through which performers historically informed communities about events beyond their locality and imparted values related to ethical living and the purpose of human life. The format is typically a "one-man show" combining prose narration with musical performance, usually presented in temples and other sacred spaces.

=== Structure ===
In this tradition, a Keertan performance is typically divided into five parts:

- Naman – an opening prayer.
- Purvaranga – the main spiritual or philosophical discourse, usually based on ancient epics (first major section).
- Chanting of the deity's name.
- Katha or Akhyan – a narrative or story supporting the earlier discourse; this forms the Uttarranga (second major section).
- Concluding prayer for universal welfare.

A performance may last from approximately 30 minutes to three hours.

=== Dress code for Naradiya Keertan ===
==== Gentlemen ====
Although no strict written rules exist, certain traditional conventions are widely observed:

- A white nine-yard cotton dhoti (performers in the Ramdasi tradition often prefer saffron-coloured attire).
- A knee-length full-sleeved kurta, often a barabandi with fabric ties instead of buttons, or a zabba worn during festive occasions.
- A white or coloured turban, commonly a Puneri Pagadi, typically saffron.
- A two-yard coloured uttareeya or uparane draped over the shoulders.
- The performer stands barefoot on a special mat, accompanied by a harmonium player on the left and a tabla player on the right.
- A fresh flower garland.
- A red or saffron tilak made of kumkum or sandalwood paste (some performers, especially in the Varkari tradition, use black bukka).

==== Ladies ====
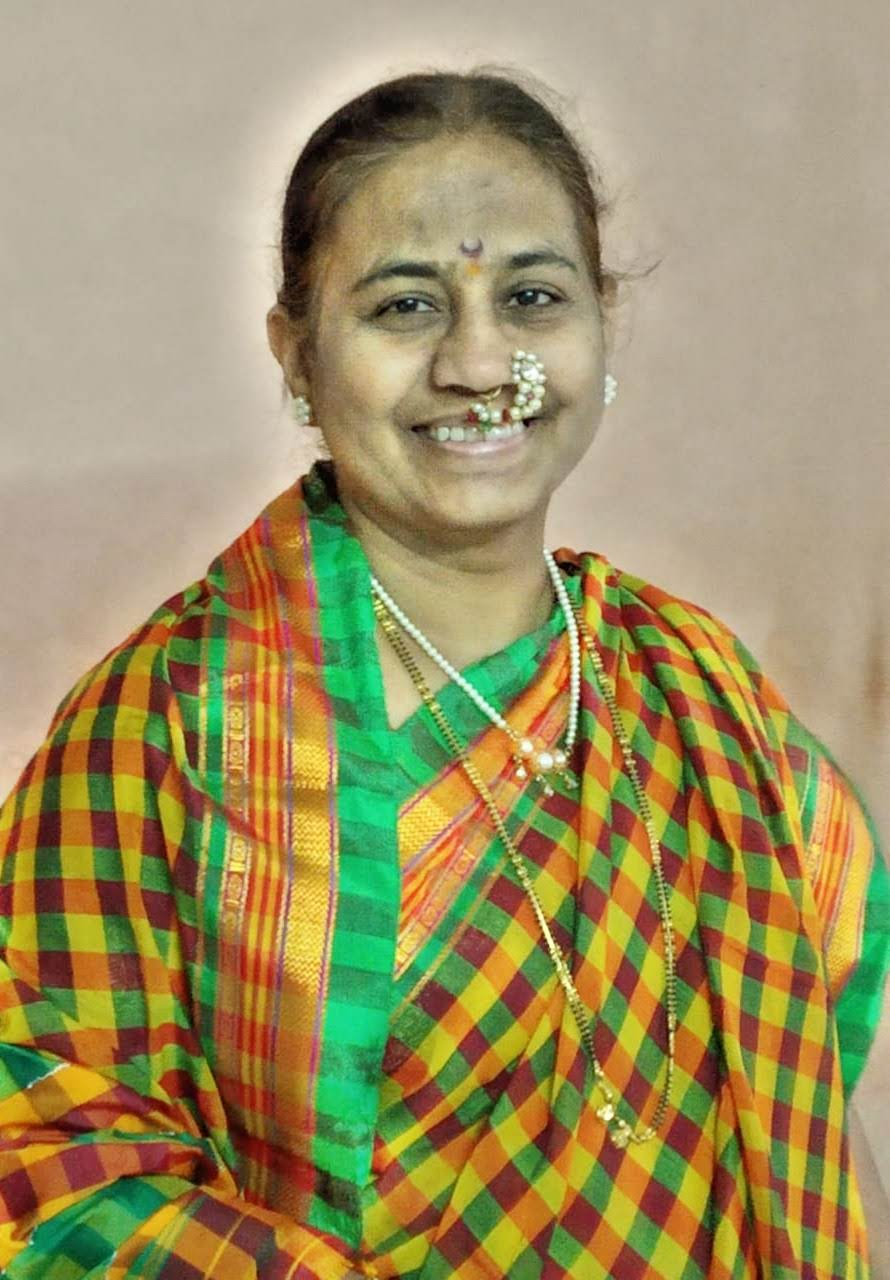
Mrs. Puja Deshmukh in traditional Marathi Keertan attire

Women performers traditionally wear:

- A nine-yard saree in the Marathi style.
- Traditional jewellery such as round earrings (kudya), bangles, necklaces, and various forms of the nose ring Nath.
- A red kumkum tilak or bindi on the forehead.

Performers typically use instruments such as the harmonium, drums, and various traditional percussion instruments including zanz, chipali, taal, and chimata. Training for Keertan requires extensive study in literature, music, dance, humour, and acting. A performer must also be an effective orator and skilled in debate. The themes commonly focus on devotion, sacrifice, kindness, bravery, moral values, overcoming life's shortcomings, and individual spiritual development.

Rigorous reading, debate practice, musical training, a good memory, and broad knowledge are among the skills associated with a Keertankar. Nevertheless, according to tradition, the central purpose of Keertan is to praise God and his divine acts.

=== Training ===
The principal institution for formal training is Keertan Kul, headquartered in Sangli and chaired by the Shankaracharya of Karveer Peeth. Several other institutes and many individual schools across India also provide instruction.

Formal training in Marathi Naradiya Keertan is offered at:

- Akhil Bharatiya Keertan Sanstha, Dadar, Mumbai
- Narad Mandir, Sadashiv Peth, Pune
- Kavikulaguru Kalidas Sanskrit University, Ramtek, Nagpur

Smaller schools also operate in Goa, Beed, and Ujjain. These institutions function as independent bodies and teach in regional languages suited to their audiences—for example, Marathi in Maharashtra, Kannada in Karnataka, Hindi in Uttar Pradesh and Madhya Pradesh, and Punjabi in Punjab. Some now offer training in additional languages, including Hindi and English.

Naradiya Keertan draws from a wide range of literary sources and may incorporate material from authors worldwide when relevant to the spiritual theme. Training is also available through correspondence courses for those preferring self-study with external guidance in literature and music. Knowledge of Sanskrit, the ancient language of India, is considered highly valuable for performers, as many Keertans draw upon mythological narratives and accounts of deities and revered figures.

== Types of Naradiya Marathi Keertan ==
Several variations of Naradiya Keertan exist. While the overall format, sequence, and dress code remain similar, each type has distinguishing features.

=== Rashtriya Keertan ===
Rashtriya literally means "nationalist." Rashtriya Keertan is a sub-type of Naradiya Keertan that incorporates nationalist themes. Inspired by the Indian freedom fighter Lokmanya Tilak, Dattopant Patwardhan—a medical practitioner from Wai in Satara district—abandoned his profession and became a pioneer of this form. He initiated the Rashtriya Keertan tradition, using the Naradiya Keertan format to educate the masses about the struggle for independence during British rule. By drawing on mythological stories and episodes from ancient epics, he conveyed messages of courage, unity, and the quest for freedom.

In contemporary times, stories of scientists, warriors, freedom fighters, social reformers, national leaders, and historical battles are frequently included. Rashtriya Keertan continues to serve as a medium for public education, combining spiritual instruction with elements of nationalism and artistic expression.

=== Ramdasi Keertan ===
This type of Keertan is associated with Samarth Ramdas and follows the general structure of Naradiya Keertan. However, its content is primarily based on the poetry and teachings of Samarth Ramdas, with most stories drawn from the Ramayana. The interludes of chanting are dedicated to Lord Rama and emphasise his virtues and bravery. In his renowned work Dasbodh, Ramdas elaborates on the methods and principles for delivering an effective Keertan.

Performers typically follow the traditional dress code of the Ramdasi sect, which features saffron-coloured attire.

=== Jugalbandi Keertan ===
Jugalbandi Keertan is an evolved form of the Naradiya tradition performed by two individuals together. The performers present philosophical themes from different perspectives, sometimes taking opposing standpoints. The format often includes question-and-answer exchanges, and may also involve interaction with the audience. The performance concludes with both Keertankars arriving at a unified message conveying a spiritual or moral lesson.

== Varkari Keertan ==
Varkari Keertan is a devotional tradition believed to have been pioneered by Sant Namdev around 900 years ago in Maharashtra. It is typically based on the poetry of seven prominent Marathi saints: Saint Nivruttinath, Sant Dnyaneshwar, Sopandev, Muktabai, Saint Eknath, Sant Namdev, and Saint Tukaram Maharaj. Verses from other saints may also be selected as needed.

Unlike Naradiya Keertan, Varkari Keertan is not divided into structured parts. A performance generally lasts two to three hours, depending on the occasion. This form has been effectively practised in modern times by noted performers such as Sonopant (Mama) Dandekar, Dhunda Maharaj Deglurkar, Babamaharaj Satarkar, and Dekhanebuwa, among others.

Training in Varkari Keertan is offered at institutions such as the centre located in Alandi near Pune.

== Modern Kirtan ==
Several contemporary forms of Kirtan, such as Scientific Kirtan and Corporate Kirtan, have gained popularity in recent years. These formats adapt the traditional structure to convey themes related to science, professional life, or modern societal values.

Recordings of Marathi Kirtans based on the lives of notable figures, including Homi K. Bhabha, C. V. Raman, and M. Visvesvaraya, are also widely available online.

== See also ==
- Jyoshna
