= Jayasimha Siddharaja =

King of Gujarat from 1092 to 1142

Jayasiṃha
- Mahārājādhirāja, Siddharāja

King of Gujarāta
- Reign: c. 1092 – c. 1142 CE
- Predecessor: Karṇa
- Successor: Kumarapāla
- Spouse: Lilāvatī-devī
- Issue: Kanchana
- Dynasty: Chaulukya (Solaṅkī)
- Father: Karṇa
- Mother: Mayaṇaḷḷa-devī

Jayasiṃha (r. c. 1092 – c. 1142), who assumed the title Siddharāja, a Chaulukya king who in western India. He controlled large parts of present-day Gujarat, where his capital Anahilapataka (modern Patan) was located. His control also extended to parts of present-day Rajasthan, where he subdued the Shakambhari Chahamana king Arnoraja, and where the former Naddula Chahamana ruler Asharaja acknowledged his suzerainty. Jayasimha also annexed a part of Malwa, in present-day Madhya Pradesh, by defeating the Paramaras. He also waged an inconclusive war against the Chandela king Madanavarman.

Jayasimha's daughter Kanchana married Arnoraja. The couple's son Someshvara (the father of Prithviraja III) was brought up by Jayasimha at the Chaulukya court.

== Early life ==
Jayasimha was a son of the Chaulukya king Karna and his Kadamba queen Mayanalladevi. (Note: According to M. A. Dhaky, the correct spelling of her name is Mailaldevi as in Kannada language.) According to folklore, he was born in Palanpur, but there is no historical evidence of this. Jayasimha ("victory lion") was so named by the old ladies of the Chaulukya palace. He later assumed the title "Siddharaja".

The 12th century Jain scholar Hemachandra mentions a legend according to which Karna prayed to the goddess Lakshmi for a son. He restored a temple of Lakshmi, and meditated for a long time, overcoming seductive apsaras and a threatening demon. Ultimately, the goddess Lakshmi appeared before him, and blessed him, as a result of which Jayasimha was born.

The 14th century author Merutunga does not mention Hemachandra's semi-mythical account. But he mentions another legend about Jayasimha's childhood: at the age of 3, Jayasimha climbed on the royal throne, and sat there. The astrologers declared that this had happened at an auspicious moment, so Karna performed his son's coronation ceremony then and there. Merutunga dates this event to 7 January 1094, and therefore, suggests that Jayasimha was born in 1091 CE. However, this account does not seem to be accurate as it has not been mentioned by earlier authors such as Hemachandra. In his Dvyashraya, Hemachandra mentions several mythical tales presenting Jayasimha as an epic hero. Had Merutunga's account been historically accurate, Hemachandra would not have failed to mention it.

According to Hemachandra, Jayasimha's father Karna had a brother named Kshemaraja who renounced his rights to the throne. Kshemaraja's descendants were Devaprasada, Tribhuvanapala and Kumarapala (who was Jayasimha's successor). When Karna died, Devaprasada left his son Tribhuvanapala in Jayasimha's care and committed suicide by immolating himself on Karna's funeral pyre. Jayasimha treated Tribhuvanapala like his own son.

All other chroniclers state that Jayasimha hated Tribhuvanapala's son Kumarapala. As Hemachandra was a courtier of both Jayasimha and Kumarapala, historian A. K. Majumdar theorizes that he created a fictional account to hide an unpleasant truth. According to Majumdar, Karna probably banished Devaprasada to avoid any rival claims to the throne. After Karna's death, Devaprasada tried to usurp the throne, taking advantage of Jayasimha's young age. However, Karna's wife Mayanalla and her loyal minister Santu had Devaprasada killed. Mayanalla then acted as a regent for the young king Jayasimha.

== Military career ==
Find spots of inscriptions issued during the reign of Jayasimha Siddharaja

=== Saurashtra ===
Multiple literary sources as well as inscriptions establish that Jayasimha Solanki defeated Khangara alias Navaghana, the king of Saurashtra. According to Merutunga, Khangara was an Abhira, which suggests that this is a reference to king Khengara of Chudasama dynasty. Jayasimha's Dahod inscription boasts that he imprisoned the king of Saurashtra; this is most probably a reference to his victory over Khangara.

According to bardic legends, Khangara married a woman coveted by Jayasimha, because of which the Chaulukya king invaded Khangara's kingdom. However, this legend is not credible. Jain chronicler Prabhachandra mentions that Siddharaja had first dispatched an army led by Kirtipala (brother of Kumarapala) to attack Navaghana. When this army was unsuccessful, another force led by Udayana was dispatched in its support. This joint army defeated Navagaha, but Udayana was killed in the battle. Prabhachandra goes on to mention that Jayasimha later killed Khangara. According to Merutunga, Navaghana was another name of Khangara. So, it appears that Khangara was not completely subdued in the battle in which Udayana was killed.

Merutunga claims that Khangara defeated Jayasimha 11 times, but the Chaulukya king emerged victorious in the 12th battle. Merutunga's claim cannot be taken literally: 12 was a favourite number of the Jain writers, and he may have used the number to emphasize the seriousness of the war. Merutunga's legend also states that Khangara fortified Vardhamana and other cities. He did not want to die by weapons, and therefore, asked his nephew to kill him with coins if the enemy succeeded in scaling the ramparts. As a result, he was beaten to death with boxes full of coins.

According to Jayasimha Suri, after defeating Khangara, Jayasimha appointed Sajjana as the governor of Girnar (a town in Saurashtra). This is corroborated by an 1120 CE inscription found at Girnar. Merutunga also supports this claim, although he calls Sajjana the governor of Saurashtra. Historical evidence indicates that Jayasimha was unable to capture all of Khangara's territories in Saurashtra: Jayasimha's successor Kumarapala had to send an army against the Abhiras. According to Prabhachandra, Jayasimha was unable to annex Khangara's kingdom because a large number of Khangara's followers continued to offer resistance.

=== Chahamanas of Naddula ===
The Naddula Chahamana ruler Asharaja (alias Ashvaraja) became a vassal of Jayasimha. It appears that Asharaja was dethroned by his rival Ratnapala, because of which he sought Jayasimha's help. Ashraja's 1110 CE and 1116 CE inscriptions do not mention Jayasimha as his overlord. Ratnapala's 1120 CE and 1135 CE inscriptions prove that he was the ruler of Naddula during this period. Thus, Ratnapala must have displaced Asharaja sometime during 1116–1119 CE.

Ashraja must have sought help from Jayasimha sometime before 1143 CE; his 1143 CE inscription describes him as subsisting on the feet of Jayasimha. The later 1262 CE Sundha Hill inscription also states that Asharaja pleased Jayasimha by helping him in a campaign in Malwa.

Despite gaining Jayasimha's favour, Asharaja was not able to recapture Naddula. This is proved by the fact that Ratnapala's son and successor Rayapala issued eight inscriptions from Naddula during 1132–1145 CE.

=== Chahamanas of Shakambhari ===
Several sources suggest that Jayasimha subdued the Shakambhari Chahamana ruler Arnoraja. Arnoraja's ancestor Vigraharaja III had helped the Paramara king Udayaditya against Jayasimha's father Karna. So, the two kingdoms most probably did not have friendly relations when Jayasimha ascended the throne. The conflict between Arnoraja and Jayasimha may have been triggered by their attempts to control the weakening Paramara kingdom of Malwa.

The Chaulukya poet Someshvara, in his Kirti-Kaumudi, states that when Arnoraja saw the severed heads of kings lying before his feet, he bowed to Jayasimha out of fear. Hemachandra's Dvyashraya also states that Ānā of Sapadalaksha (that is, Arnoraja), bent his head before Jayasimha. An inscription discovered at the Chahamana capital Shakambhari (modern Sambhar) provides a genealogy of the Chaulukya kings, from Mularaja to Jayasimha. It mentions Shakambhari, which indicates that Jayasimha may have even occupied the Chahamana capital for a brief period.

Jayasimha's daughter Kanchana-devi married Arnoraja. The poet Someshvara declares that the only difference between Jayasimha and the deity Vishnu was that Vishnu took the daughter of the Arno (literally "ocean") as his wife, while Siddharaja gave away his daughter in marriage to Arno-raja. The Chahamana chronicle Prithviraja Vijaya also states that Jayasimha's daughter was one of the two wives of Arnoraja. Usually, the defeated kings would give their daughters in marriage to the victor. So, it is not certain why Jayasimha married his daughter to Arnoraja. He probably saw this as a diplomatic way to end the hostility between the two families. This strategy seems to have been successful, as Arnoraja helped him against the Paramara king Naravarman.

Someshvara (not to be confused with the poet), who later became the Chahamana king, was a son of Arnoraja and Kanchana. According to Prithviraja Vijaya, some astrologers told Jayasimha that Someshvara's son (Prithviraja III) would be an incarnation of Rama. Therefore, Jayasimha brought up Someshvara in his own kingdom.

=== Paramaras of Malwa ===
During the 1130s CE, Jayasimha defeated a Paramara king of Malwa (or Avanti). The Vadnagar prashasti inscription of his successor states that he imprisoned the king of Malwa, which scared all other rulers of the earth. The Dahod inscription also confirms Jayasimha's victory, but doesn't name the Paramara king. The Talwara inscription states that Jayasimha humbled the pride of Naravarman, but the Ujjain inscription states that Jayasimha defeated Naravarman's successor Yashovarman. Multiple chronicles also mention this victory. According to the chronicles written by Someshvara, Jinamandana and Jayasimha Suri, the Paramara king was Naravarman. However, other chroniclers such as Hemachandra, Arisimha, and Merutunga state that he was Yashovarman.

Historian A. K. Majumdar theorizes that the Chaulukya-Paramara war began during the reign of Naravarman (r. c. 1094-1133 CE), and ended during the reign of Yashovarman (c. 1133-1142 CE). Jayasimha's title Avantinatha ("Lord of Avanti") first appears in the 1137 CE Gala inscription. The Naddula Chahamana ruler Asharaja as well as the Shakambhari Chahamana ruler Arnoraja (r. c. 1135-1150 CE) helped Jayasimha in this campaign. Based on these evidences, Jayasimha's conquest of the Paramara capital Dhara can be dated to 1135-1136 CE.

According to the 12th century chronicler Hemachandra, Jayasimha was the aggressor in this conflict, while the 14th century chronicler Merutunga claims that the war started with a Paramara invasion of the Chaulukya kingdom. Hemachandra claims that some yoginis once asked Jayasimha to visit Ujjain, and worship the goddess Kalika there. Since Ujjain was located in the Paramara territory, Jayasimha invaded the Paramara kingdom. He first marched to Ujjain, and then captured the Paramara capital Dhara. He tied up Yashovarman "like a bird" and subdued the entire Avanti region (the Paramara territory). Hemachandra's account features elements of fantasy.

According to Merutunga's legend, Jayasimha once went on a pilgrimage to Somnath with his mother. Taking advantage of his absence, Yashovarman invaded the Chaulukya capital. Jayasimha's minister Santu requested Yashovarman to negotiate a peace treaty. Yashovarman replied that he would leave if he was granted all the merits (punya) gained by Jayasimha during the Somnath pilgrimage. Santu agreed, and conducted a ceremony to symbolically transfer Jayasimha's merits to Yashovarman. The Paramara king then returned to Malwa. When Jayasimha returned to his capital and learned about what had happened in his absence, he became furious. He invaded Malwa, and defeated the Paramara king after a 12-year war. Merutunga's account does not seem credible, because the Paramaras were too weak at this time to invade the powerful Chaulukya kingdom.

The poet Someshvara states that Jayasimha put Naravarman in a wooden cage like a parrot. Balachandra adds that Naravarman was brought to Gujarat in a wooden cage. Jayasimha Suri claims that when Siddharaja decided to invade the Paramara kingdom, he took a vow to make a scabbard for his sword with Naravarman's skin. He defeated Naravarman after a 12-year campaign, and fulfilled this vow. Jina-Mandana repeats the same story, but states that Jayasimha's ministers convinced him to give up this vow.

The Ujjain inscription states that Jayasimha appointed one Mahadeva as the governor of Avanti. Yashovarman may have also ruled the Paramara kingdom as Jayasimha's vassal. It is not known for how long did Jayasimha control Malwa. Yashovarman's successor Jayavarman I (Paramara dynasty) (r. c. 1142-43) assumed the title Maharajadhiraja, which indicates that he managed to restore the Paramara ruler in at least a part of Malwa. However, he was dethroned by an usurper named Ballala, apparently after Jayasimha's death.

=== Chandelas ===
Jayasimha's conquest of Malwa made him a neighbour of the Chandela kingdom, which was located to the east of Malwa. Several Chaulukya chronicles claim that Jayasimha subdued the Chandela king Madanavarman. On the other hand, the Kalanjara inscription of the Chandelas states that Madanavarman defeated the king of Gurjara (that is, Jayasimha) in an instant, just like Krishna had defeated Kamsa. The Prithviraj Raso of Chand Bardai also corroborates this claim. These contradictory claims suggest that the conflict between Jayasimha and Madanavarman was inconclusive, with both the sides claiming victory.

The Chaulukya court poet Someshvara claims that the Chandela king submitted to Jayasimha, frightened by the Chaulukya conquest of Malwa. Another chronicler Jayasimha Suri claims that Jayasimha Siddharaja defeated Madanavarman, and took 960 million gold coins from the Chandela king. According to Jina Mandana's Kumarapala-Prabandha, a bard once told Jayasimha that Madanavarman was a very wise, generous and pleasure-loving ruler, whose court was as splendid as that of Jayasimha. Jayasimha confirmed the veracity of this claim by sending a person to Mahoba. He then invaded the Chandela kingdom. After reaching the outskirts of Mahoba, he sent an emissary, asking Madanavarman to surrender. Madanavarman was busy celebrating the spring festival, and did not take the demand seriously. When the emissary reminded him about the fate of the Paramaras, he derisively asked his minister to make Jayasimha return by paying him some money. Jayasimha received the money, but when he heard about Madanavarman's nonchalance, he refused to return without meeting the Chandela king. He visited the Chandela palace with a large retinue. Only four of his attendants were allowed to accompany him inside the palace, but Madanavarman offered him a warm reception. Consequently, Jayasimha returned to his capital peacefully. According to K. M. Munshi, this legend is "fanciful", and Jayasimha did not achieve much success against the Chandelas.

=== Other conflicts ===
The Talwara inscription of the Chaulukyas boasts that Jayasimha crushed Permardi. "Permardi" was a title used by the contemporary Kalyani Chalukya monarch Vikramaditya VI, as well as several other rulers. The Permardi mentioned in the Talwara inscription is unlikely to be Vikramaditya VI, since such a victory would have been the greatest military success of Jayasimha. Jayasimha's victory over Permardi is not mentioned in other records, and finds only a casual mention in the Talwara inscription. This suggests that Permardi was an insignificant ruler. Historian A. K. Majumdar identifies him with Perma-nripa, the son of an obscure king named Pitta, mentioned in a Huli inscription.

The Kalyani Chalukya records claim that Vikramaditya VI crossed the Narmada River, and conquered the Lata and Gurjara regions. This claim is not supported by historical evidence, though it is possible that Vikramaditya raided the territory to the north of Narmada.

Jayasimha helped Someshvara, a ruler of the Paramara branch of Bhinmal, regain his lost throne. Someshvara's father Udayaraja claims to have conquered "Choda, Gauda and Karnata". This probably refers to the wars he fought as one of Jayasimha's generals. In this context, Gauda may refer to eastern Punjab.

The 1158 Ujjain inscription describes Jayasimha as Barbaraka-jishnu ("conqueror of Barbaraka"), an epithet also used by his successors. According to Hemachandra, Barbaraka was a rakshasa (demon), who harassed the sages of the hermitage located on the banks of the Sarasvati River at Shristhala (Siddhapura). Jayasimha defeated Barbaraka at the request of the sages, but later released him. Barbaraka then gifted precious jewels to Jayasimha, and became his follower. Later chroniclers also repeat this legendary account with some variations. The historical identification of Barbaraka is not certain, but scholars such as Georg Bühler and Bhagwan Lal Indraji speculated that he was a non-Aryan tribal chief.

The Dahod inscription states that Jayasimha defeated Sindhuraja, who was probably a Soomra king of Sindh.

== Succession ==
Jayasimha did not have a son. According to his Jain courtier Hemachandra, he had visited several Hindu and Jain shrines to pray for a male heir, but then came to learn through divination that he would be succeeded by his grand-nephew Kumarapala. According to the legends in the later Jain chronicles, Jayasimha hated Kumarapala, and tried to persecute him during his lifetime. However, Kumarapala escaped, and became the king after his death.

== Diplomatic relations ==
According to Merutunga, the king of Dahala (the Tripuri Kalachuri ruler) sent a letter of alliance to Jayasimha. This Kalachuri king was probably Yashah-Karna.

Merutunga also claims that Jayasimha had a diplomatic agent at the court of Jayachandra, the king of Varanasi. However, Jayachandra's reign started in c. 1170 CE, nearly three decades after the end of Jayasimha's reign in c. 1142 CE. During Jayasimha's reign, the king of Varanasi was the Gahadavala ruler Govindachandra, who was Jayachandra's grandfather. Historian A. K. Majumdar speculates that Jayachandra may have assisted his grandfather in an expedition; Merutunga's claim probably refers to an alliance between the Chaulukyas and the Gahadavalas.

== Cultural activities ==
=== Literature ===
Jayasimha patronized several scholars, and made Gujarat a noted centre of learning and literature.

Most notably, he was a patron of the Jain scholar Hemachandra. According to the Jain chronicles, when Jayasimha defeated the Paramaras of Malwa, he brought several Sanskrit manuscripts form Malwa to Gujarat. One of these manuscripts included a treatise on grammar written by the 11th century Paramara king Bhoja. Impressed by this work, Jayasimha commissioned Hemachandra to write a simpler and more comprehensive treatise on grammar. Hemachandra completed the new treatise after consulting several other works, and included the king's name in the title of the new work, Siddha Hema Shabdanushasana. Jayasimha had the treatise distributed all over India. Hemachandra also composed other works such as Dvyashraya Kavya, which were completed after Jayasimha's death.

Jayasimha also patronized the poet Sripala, who composed the Vadnagar prashasti inscription after his death. The poet described himself as the king's brother. This is corroborated by the chronicler Somaprabha who mentions that Jayasimha considered Sripala his brother, and bestowed the title of Kavindra upon him.

Other poets and writers who flourished during Jayasimha's reign included Hemachandra's disciple Ramachandra, Acharya Jayamangala, (author of Kavi-shiksha), the dramatist Yashahchandra (author of Mudrita-Kumudachandra), the poet Vardhamana (author of Siddharaja-Varnana).

=== Coins ===
The gold coins attributed to Siddharaja are found in Pandwaha near Jhansi, Uttar Pradesh. The gold coins are round weights 65-66 grains and measures 0.8" to 0.9". It has legend Shri Siddharajah on reverse and obverse. The silver coins attributed to him are found at Vanthali, Junagadh and Pilwai in North Gujarat. On obverse of these silver coins, the three lines legend Shri Jayasimha in Nagari script appears; with one more word priya in some coins. On reverse there is an image of an elephant. These elephant either represents Laxmi or commemorates victory in war with Avanti in which his beloved elephant Yasahapatala which was killed. They are 20 grains (1.715 gram) in weight and 0.3" in measure. Some small copper coins are also reported.

=== Religion and constructions ===
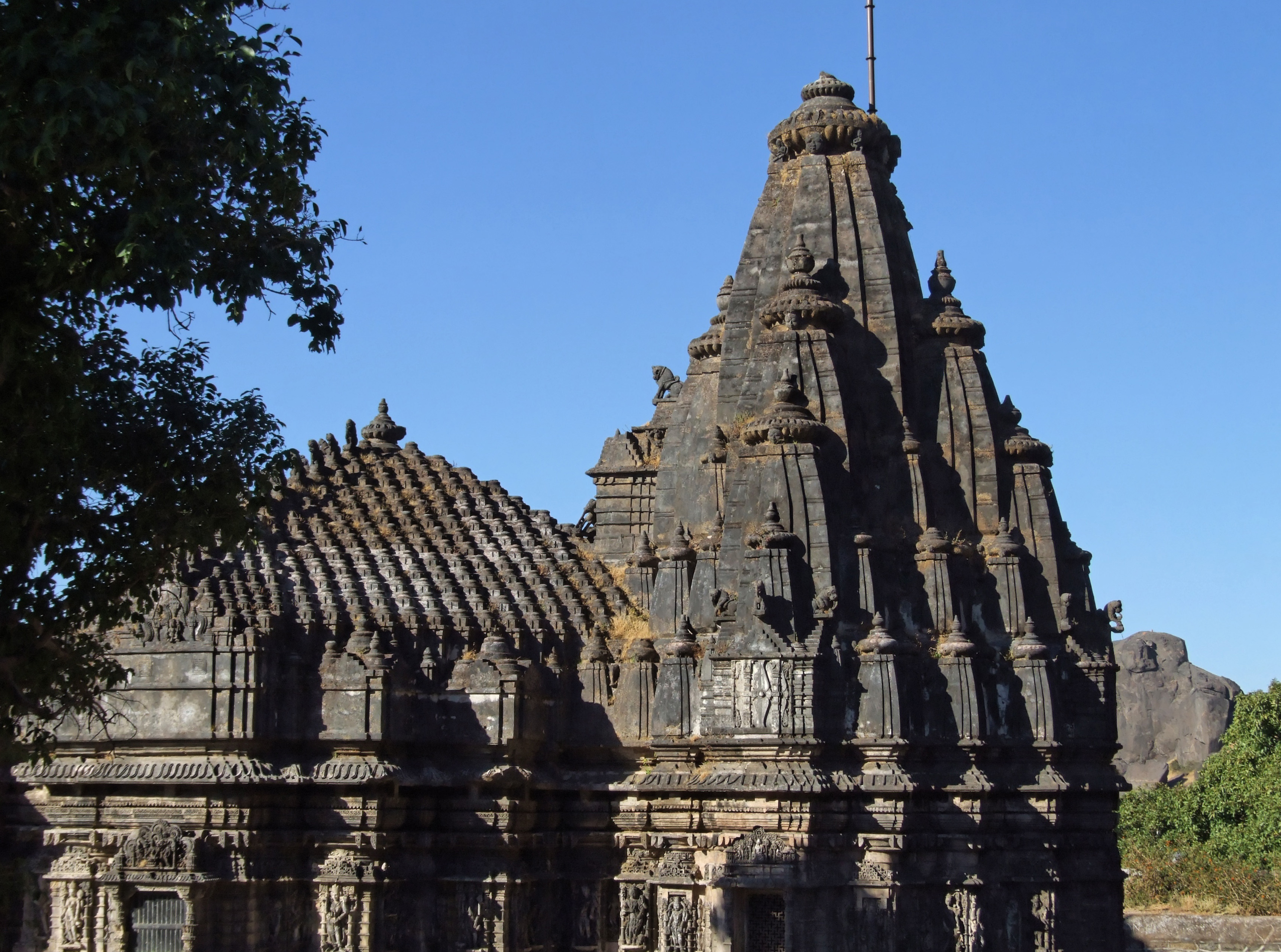
Neminath temple on Mount Girnar

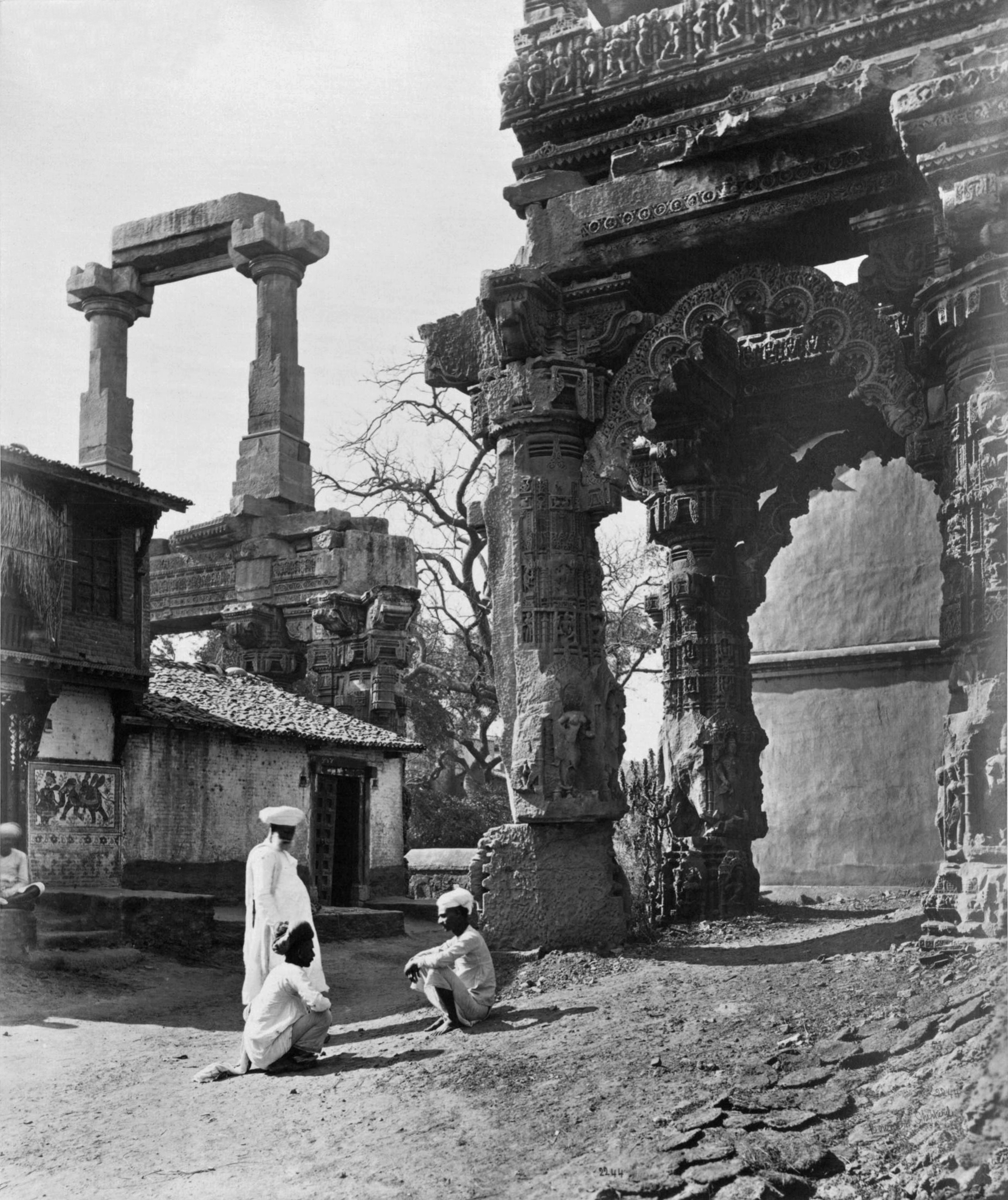
Ruins of the Rudra Mahalaya Temple

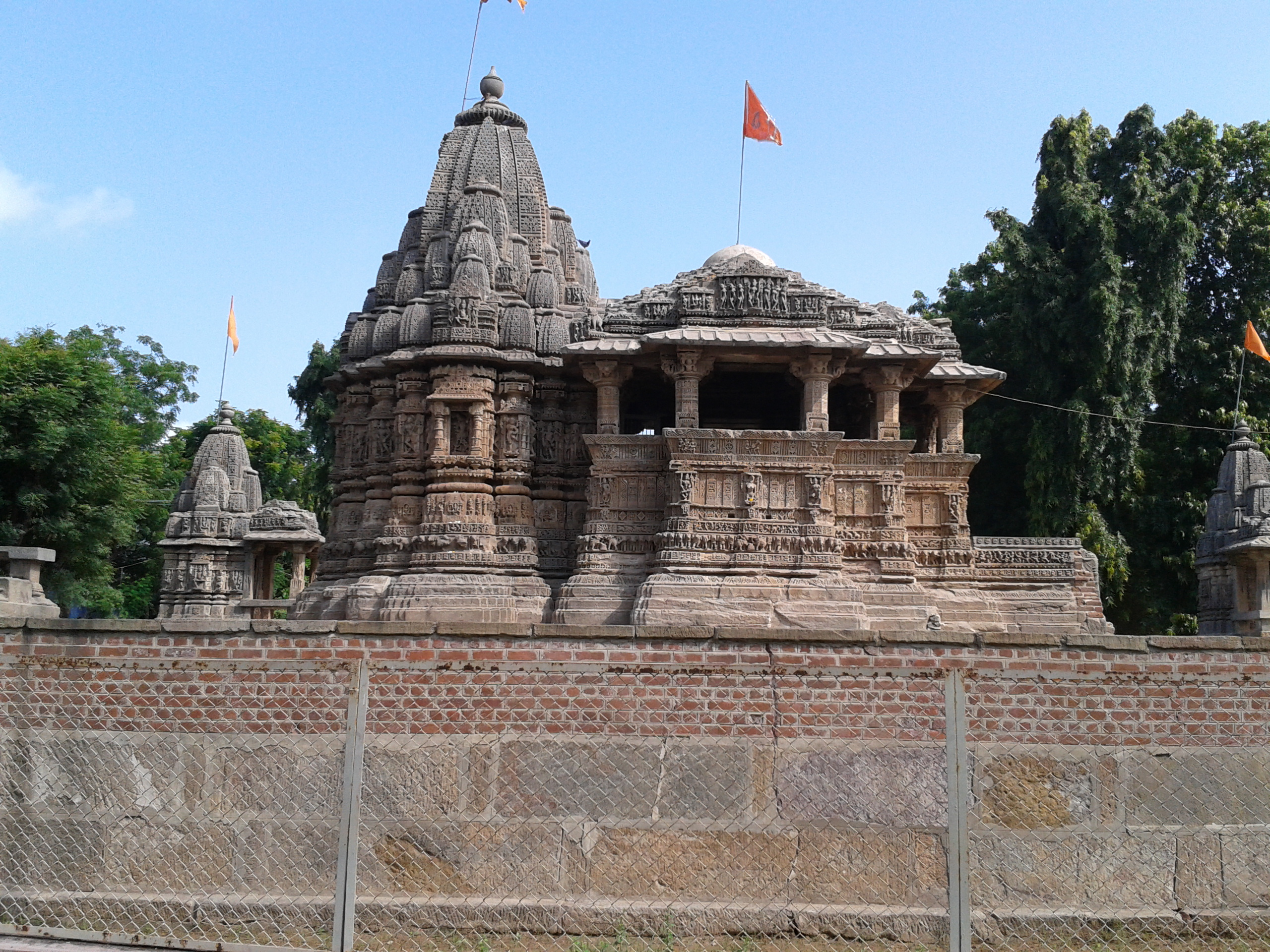
Jasmalnathji Mahadev Temple, Asoda

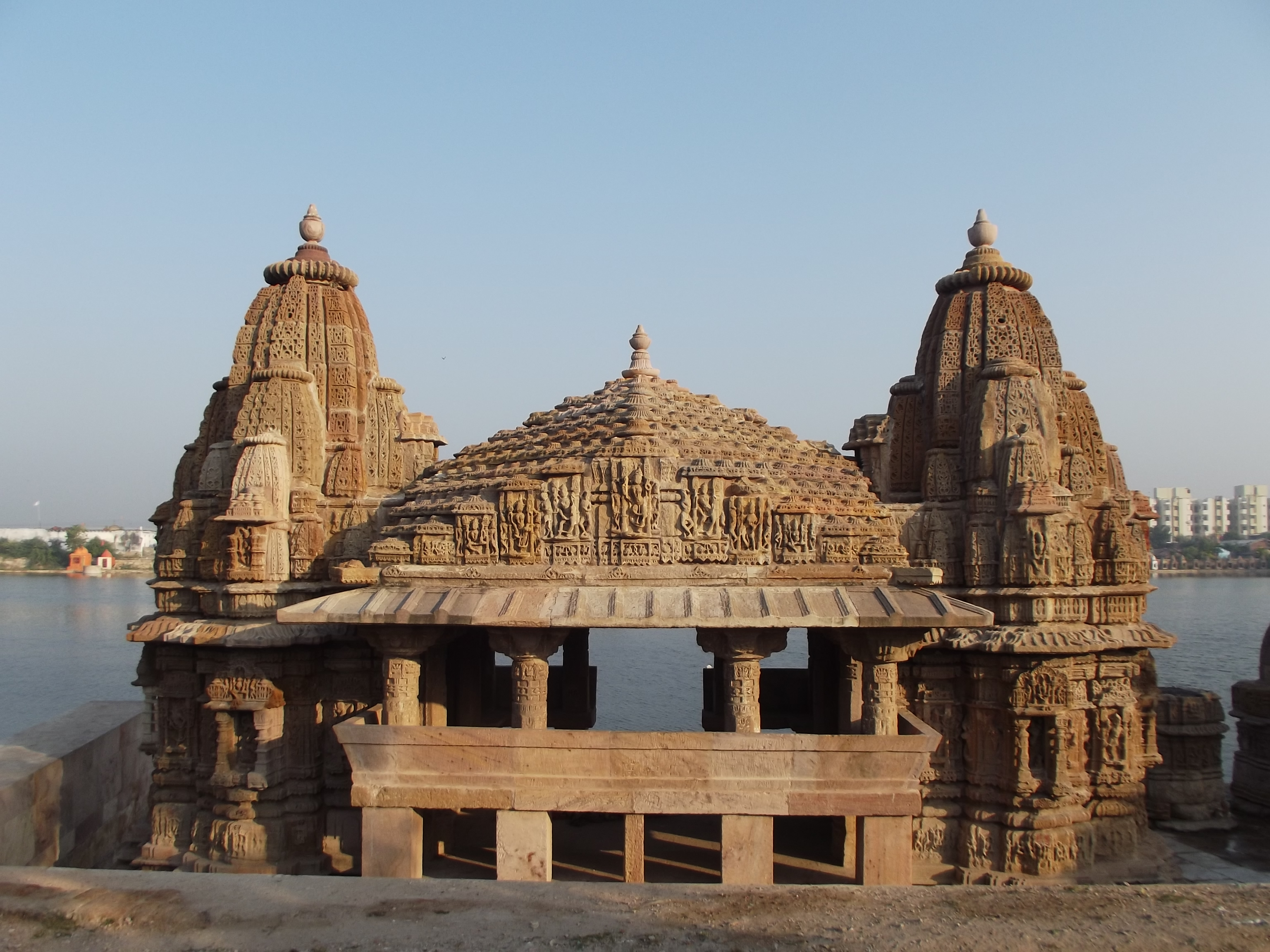
Shrine on the banks of Munsar Lake, Viramgam

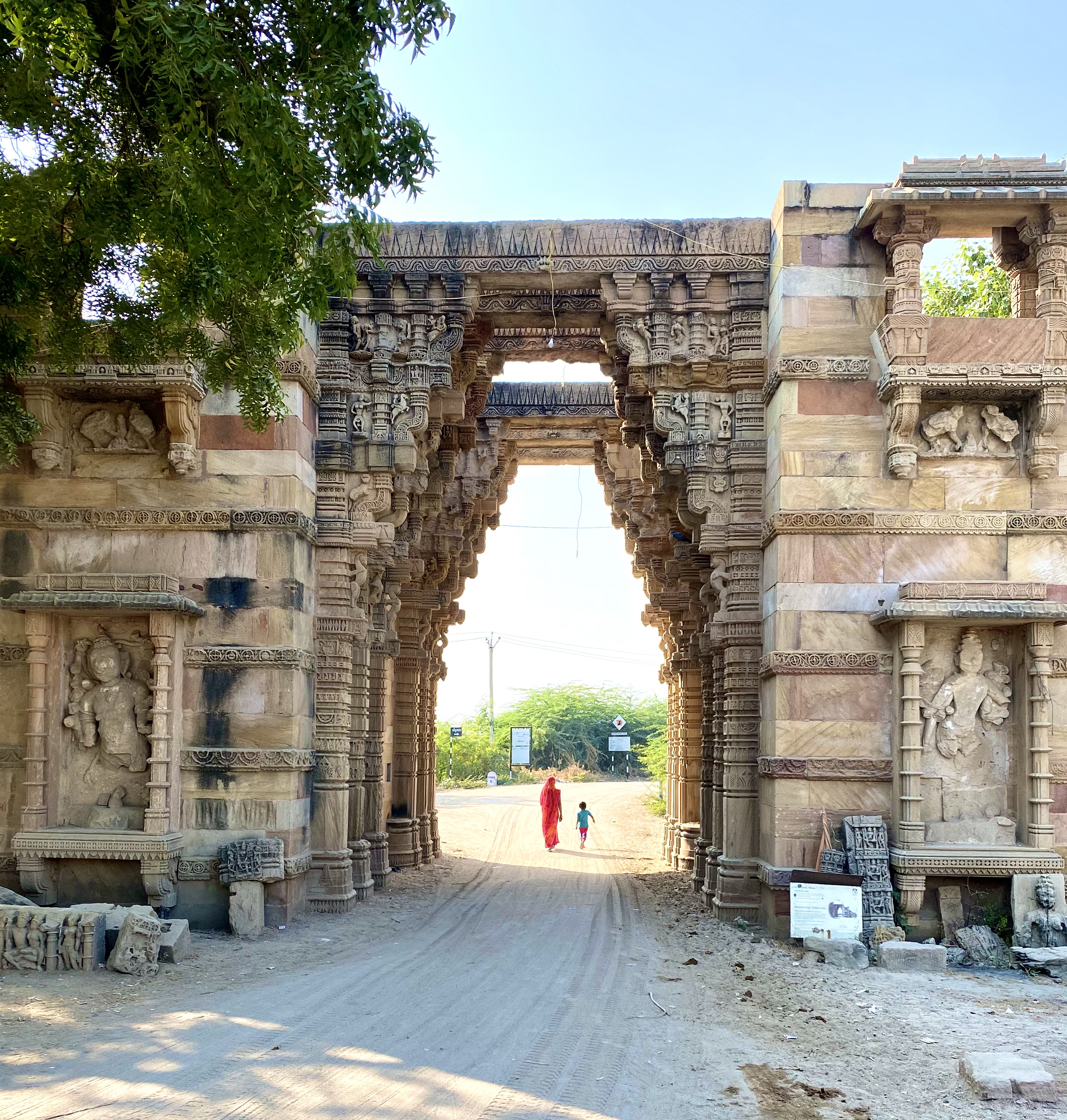
Madapol gate of Jhinjhuwada fort

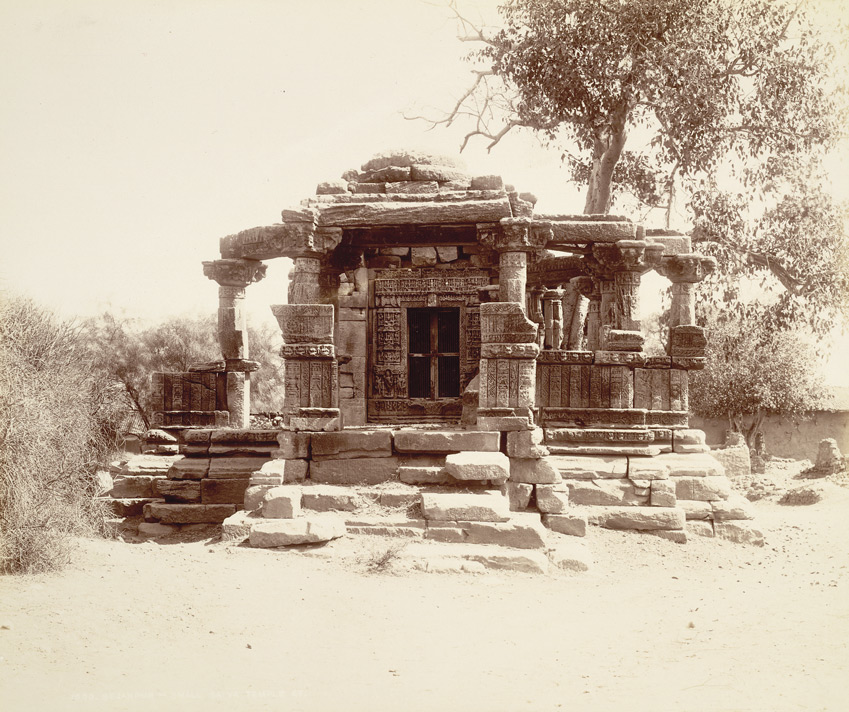
Ruins of Shiva temple, Sejakpur

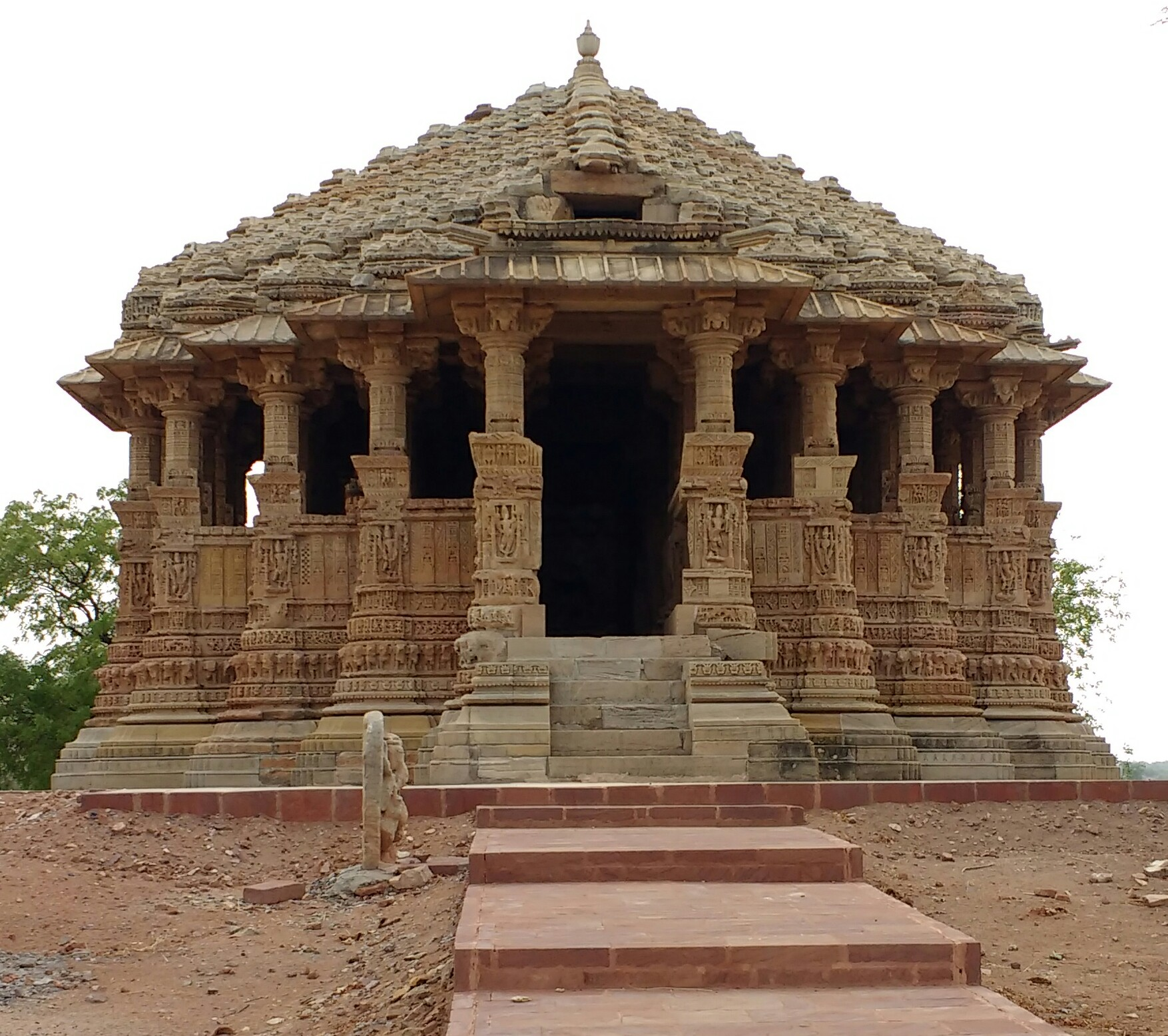
Navlakha temple, Sejakpur

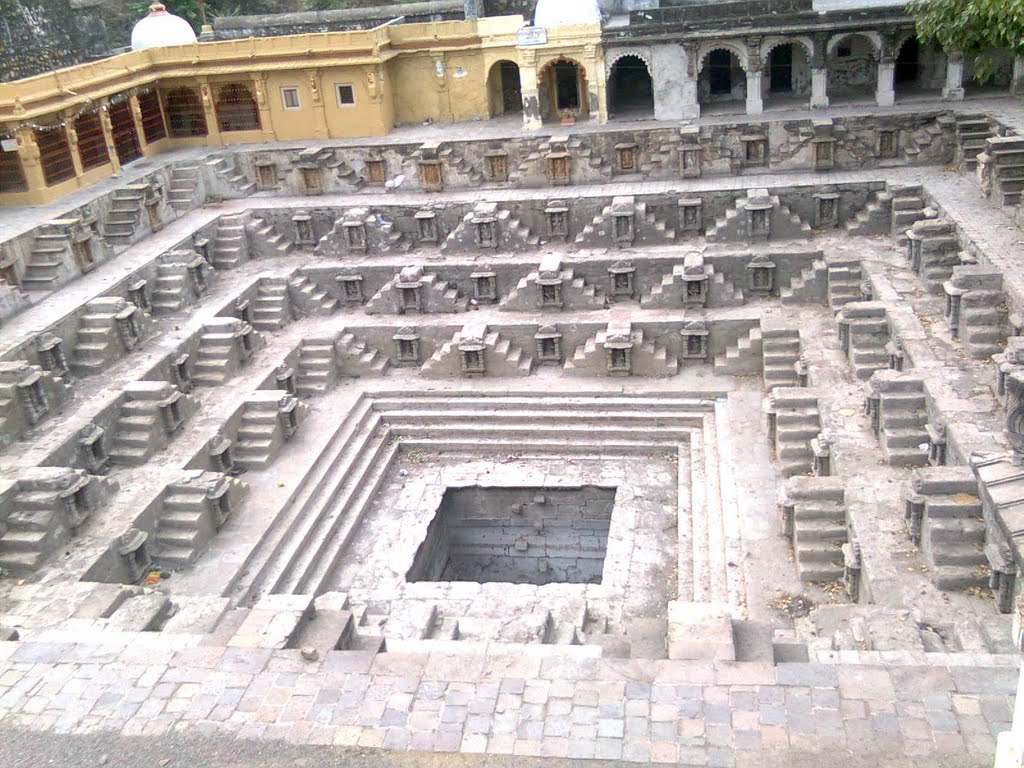
Brahma Kund, Sihor

Jayasimha was a Shaivite, but he showed tolerance to other sects and religions. It is believed that people of 98 different faiths and creeds were living peacefully in his capital. According to Someshvara's Surathotsava Mahakavya, his ancestor Kumara served as a priest (purohita) to Jayasimha Siddharaja. Someshvara states that Kumara's blessings helped Jayasimha subjugate the rulers of Sindhu-desha, Malava, and Sapadalaksha.

The king's religious perceptor was Bhava Brihaspati, who originally lived in Malwa, and had been brought to Gujarat after Jayasimha's victory over the Paramaras. Jayasimha either renovated or rebuilt the Rudra Mahalaya Temple at Siddhapura (modern Siddhpur). It was the greatest temple of his period, of which only some pillars, shrines and arches survives today. It was completed in 1142 CE. He renovated a lake built by his ancestor Durlabha in Patan, and named it Sahastralinga ("1000 lingas"). The lake was surrounded by 1008 small shrines, each of which housed a linga (symbols of Shiva). Jayasimha diverted the flow of the entire Saraswati River into the lake. Many artificial islands were created on which many temples, palaces, and gardens were built. On the banks of this lake were thousands of temples to Shiva. Apart from these, there were 108 temples to Devi, Yagnashala and Matha for pupils. Jayasimha invited 1001 Brahmans from Varanasi at the time of the renovation of Sahastralinga lake; their successors are known as Audichya Brahmin. There is a legend of Jasma Odan associated with the lake who had cursed Jayasimha to remain childless. According to Jain sources, he also built Siddhavihara at Siddhpur. The stepwell in Dhandhalpur is also ascribed to Jayasimha Siddharaja. His mother Mayanalladevi is credited for building lakes at Viramgam and Dholka. The Minal stepwell in Balej village in Sabarkantha district are ascribed to her and was built in 1095 CE. A stepwell in Nadiad and Minaldevi Vav in Virpur in Rajkot district are also ascribed to her and has stylistic affinities to Chaulukya architecture. The fort of Jhinjhuwada with its well-carved gates as well as the five kunds at Sihor were built during his period.

Jayasimha patronized several Jain scholars, and the Jains occupied important positions in his kingdom. The Jain authors show him treating all the different religious communities impartially. According to Hemachandra's Dvyashrya-Kavya, Jayasimha made arrangements for the maintenance of Jain monks, and also visited the shrine of Neminatha on his way to Somanatha. The Jain chronicles state that Sajjana, the governor of Saurashtra, appropriated the state funds to build a temple of Neminatha. However, Jayasimha was so impressed by the temple's beauty that he forgave Sajjana.

Some later Jain chronicles claim that Hemachandra convinced Jayasimha that Jainism was superior to Shaivism, and that the king banned animal slaughter for 8 days in each year. However, these stories are apocryphal in nature and were invented several centuries after Jayasimha's death. The 14th century chronicler Merutunga states that Jayasimha once banned the Jain temples from hoisting their banners, but later revoked it, acknowledging it as a mistake.

In Patan, Jayasimha built Rayavihara or Rajavihara, the great temple commemorating victory of Shwetambara Jain Acharya Vadi Devsuri over Digambara Jain pontiff Kumudchandra. It was constructed under Minister Ashuka and consecrated in 1127 CE. His minister Udayana built Udayana-vasatika at Khambhat mentioned by Kavi Dungara's Khambhayat-chaitya-paripati. Minister Solaka built Solaka-vasati at Patan before 1112 CE. Another Shantinath Jain temple was built in Patan somewhere before 1125 CE. His minister and later governor of Sorath, Sajjana built Neminath temple on Mount Girnar which was consecrated in 1129 CE according to Jinaprabha and other sources. Hemchandra also mentions his erection of Mahavira temple at Siddhpur which appears same as the Siddhavihara mentioned in Kumarapalapratibodha (1185 CE). It was also known as Rai-vihara. This chaturmukha temple was supervised by Minister Aliga and consecrated by Vadi Devasuri in 1142 CE. Later it was used as a model for Dharana-vihara temple at Ranakpur. Other temples mentioned are Ukesha-vasati (before 1109 CE) at Patan, Parshwanath temple (after 1118 CE) by Nittala Devi at Patadi, the Jain temple (1119 CE) at Patan by Dandanayaka Kapardi and installed by Jayasimhasuri, Simandhara temple (1119 CE) at Dholka by Minister Udayana and installed by Vadi Devasuri, Munisuvrata temple (1137 CE) at Dholka by Shreshthi Dhavala. The Neminatha temple at Kumbhariya was consecrated in 1137 CE by Vadi Devasuri. The Bhattarika Temple with Vinayaka-kulika at Gala in Saurashtra as well as Udaleshwara and Kurpaleshwara temples in Bhadravati (Bhadreshwar) were erected in 1137 CE. The Dahod inscription mentions Goga Narayan temple built by Senapati Keshava in memory of his mother in 1140 CE. Koka-vasati mentioned in Vividha-tirthakalpa as well as the Jain temple at Bhalej by Shreshti Yashodhana were built during this period.

The extant temples of his period include Parshwanath Jain temple at Kumbhariya, Shrikrishna temple at Valam, Jasmalnathji Mahadev Temple at Asoda near Vijapur, Shitalamata temple at Piludra, small double shrine at Khandoran, the shrines at Munsar Lake at Viramgam, two temples at Chaubari in Saurashtra, Chandramauli temple at Kamboi, the shrines in compound old Limboji Mata temple and some other shrines in and around Delmal, old Shiva temple at Ruhavi, the triple shrine at Kasara; many of them are in north Gujarat. Other temples include the best surviving Navlakha temple, Shiva shrine opposite it and a small Jain temple at Sejakpur as well as the Navlakha temple at Anandpur.

Jayasimha extended his religious tolerance to Islam as well, and the Muslim historian Muhammad Aufi has recorded stories about his impartiality. During his rule, Parsis had incited some Hindus to destroy a mosque and kill eighty Muslims. A survivor then petitioned to Siddharāja, who then personally made an inquiry at Khambhat. Siddharaja declared it was his duty as king to let his subjects live in peace and practice their religion, and paid 1 lakh of Balotras to rebuild the mosque. According to a legend, a da'i named Ahmad once took two Gujarati orphans (Abdullah and Nuruddin) to Cairo, trained them in the Ismaili doctrine, and sent them back to Gujarat as missionary. Abdullah laid the foundation of the Bohra community. According to the Bohra myths, Jayasimha sent an army to capture Abdullah, but Abdullah converted him to Islam by performing miracles and by exposing the purported miracles of Hindu pandits as fake. There is no evidence that Jayasimha ever gave up Shaivism, but several of the Bohra Walis and Da'i al-Mutlaqs claimed descent from him. These included Syedna Ismail, the 34th Da'i al-Mutlaq. In another Ismaili tradition called Satpanth, it is claimed that Jayasimha was converted to their tradition by their allegedly the first leader, Pir Satgur Nur.
