= Munsar Lake =

Lake and shrines in Gujarat, India

Coordinates: 23°07′19″N 72°02′35″E

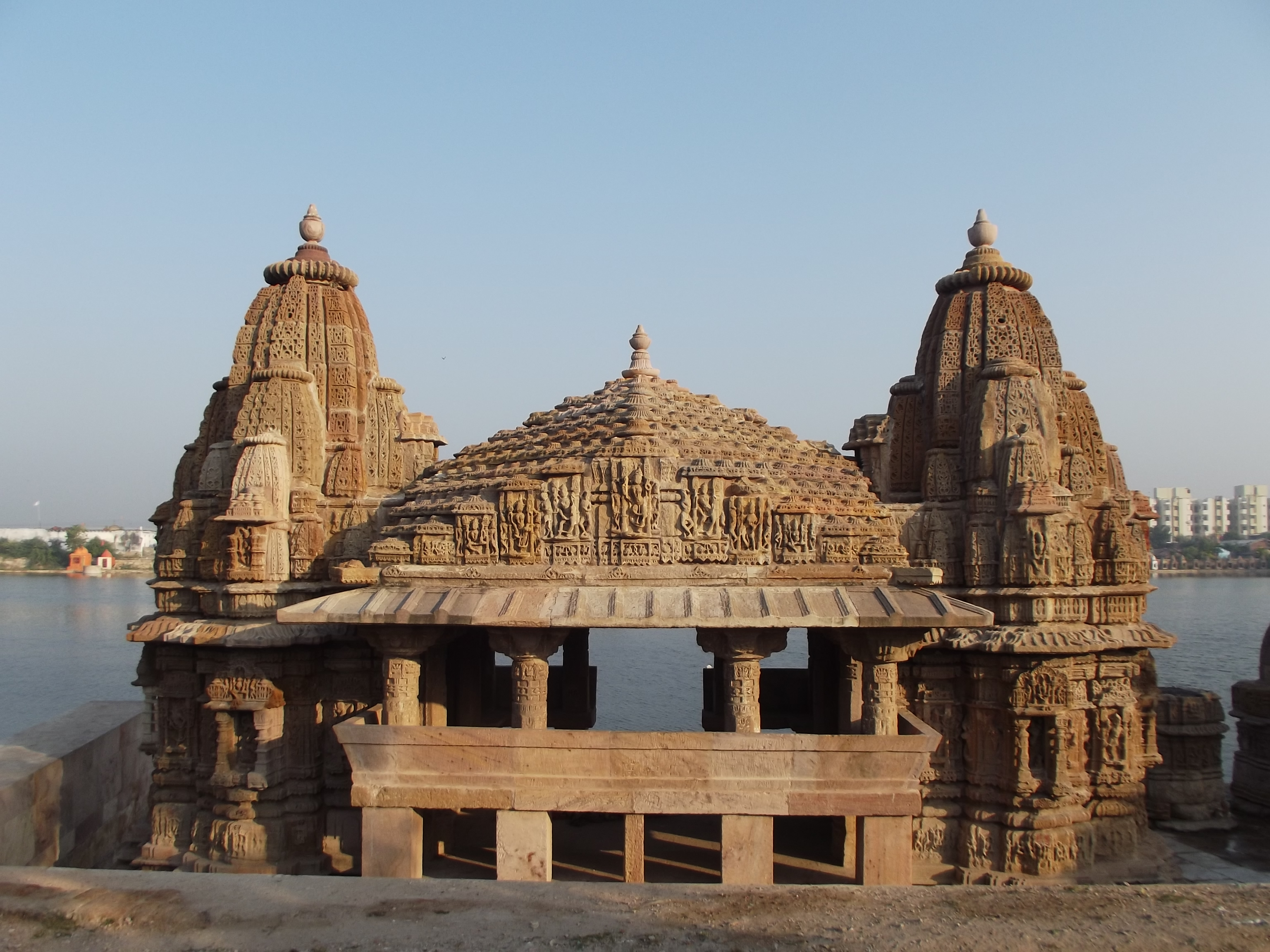
Munsar Lake, Viramgam

Munsar Lake (મુનસર તળાવ) is water body constructed by Minaldevi, mother of Jayasimha Siddharaja, of Chaulukya dynasty. It was named as Mansavor but due to Indiscretion it's widely known as Munsar. This lake is situated at Viramgam, near Ahmedabad.

== History ==
This lake was built during 1090.

During 2015 Gujarat Minister Bhupendrasinh Chudasama proposed development of Malav Talav (Dholka) and Munsar Talav (Viramgam) as archaeological site with Archaeological Survey of India team. In 2016 team ASI has granted Rs. 60 million for renovation and redevelopment of the lake.

== Architecture ==
The lake is 220-yard round shaped. It's shaped like a conch and temples. Gathering from the west, the water passes into a stone-built eightsided silt-well, kund, with, in a niche in each side, a figure cut in bold relief. From the silt-well, through a stone-lined channel and a three-cylinder tunnel, the water passes into the lake.

There is a temple of Munsari (also known as Mansar) mata built by Marathas. This lake is surrounded by huge carved stone and more than 300 small and big temples (shrine). In each shrine on one side of the lake is a pedestal, probably for an image of Krishna, and on the other side a round basin, jaladhar, probably sacred to Shiva. On either side of one of the roadways that runs to the water's edge, is a larger temple with a double porch and spire and across the lake is a flat roofed colonnade.

In 2023, Hardik Patel, BJP MLA, urged Union Minister of Culture, G. Kishan Reddy to restore Munsar Lake in Gujarat's Viramgam and requested the appointment of an Archaeological Survey of India (ASI) team for its maintenance.
