= Jasmalnathji Mahadev Temple =

Hindu temple in Gujarat, India

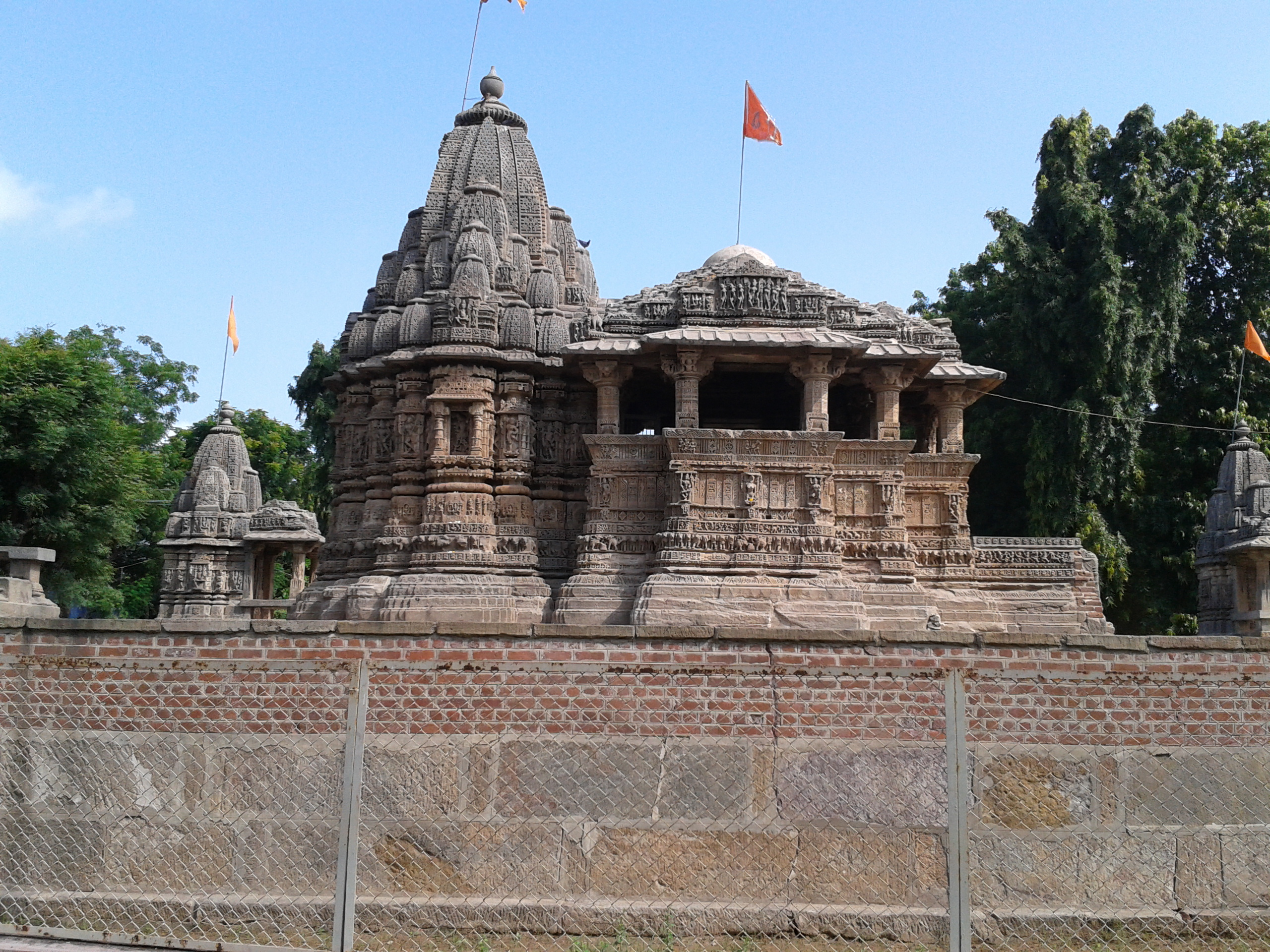
- General view of the temple

- Location in Gujarat

Religion
- Affiliation: Hinduism
- Deity: Shiva

Location
- Location: Asoda village near Vijapur, Mehsana district, Gujarat
- Interactive map of Jasmalnathji Mahadev Temple
- Coordinates: 23.583412°N 72.590233°E

Architecture
- Type: Māru-Gurjara architecture with Malwa influence
- Completed: 12th century (Chaulukya period)
- Temple: 5

Jasmalnathji Mahadev Temple is a Hindu temple located at Asoda village in Vijapur Taluka, Mehsana district, Gujarat, India. It is locally known as Vaijnath Mahadev temple. The temple is dedicated to Shiva. The temple is built in the 12th century. It consists of a sanctum; mandapa and torana, a porch.

== History ==
The temple is built in the 12th century during the reign of the Chaulukya ruler Jayasimha Siddharaja. The temple is Monument of National Importance protected and maintained by Archeological Survey of India.

== Architecture ==
Jasmalnathji Mahadev temple is a rare example of panchayatana (five-shrine) temple of the era. The four corner shrines are ruined but the central temple has survived except its samvarana roof. In elevation and plan, it is similar to the temple at Sander but larger. The lateral sides of the staircase is carved with mouldings and statues. The mandapa's chatuski is decorated in vandanmalika type, similar to Rudra Mahalaya temple. The torana, a porch, of the temple is similar to that of Vadnagar and Limboji Mata temple in Delmal.
