= Jasma Odan =

Hindu deity

Jasma Odan is a folk deity from medieval Gujarat about a woman who committed sati to protect her honor after her husband was murdered by Siddharaj Jaisinh, a king of Chaulukya dynasty.

== Legend ==
Jasma was a wife of Rooda who was a pond digger. They belonged to the Odh rajput tribe, a drifting tribe of laborers in Gujarat, Kathiawar, and some parts of Rajasthan. They were at Anhilwad Patan to dig Sahastralinga Tank, a lake and thousand shrines with lingam. Siddharaj Jaisinh, a king of Chaulukya dynasty, was captivated by the beauty of Jasma and proposed marriage. He offered to make her queen of Gujarat but she refused. Jaisinh killed her husband. She committed sati, by jumping into the pyre, to protect her honor. Her curse made the tank of Sahasralinga waterless and Siddharaj without an heir to his kingdom of Gujarat.

The Jasmadevi temple dedicated to her, constructed by the Odh rajput tribe in the 12th century, is situated near Sahasralinga Tank at Patan, Gujarat.

== Popular culture ==
A Bhavai vesha, a folk theatre form based on legend, has been performed since the nineteenth century. It was recreated for a stage performance titled Jasma Odan by Shanta Gandhi in 1982. The 1926 Indian silent film Sati Jasma about the folk deity was created by Homi Master. It starred Gohar Mamajiwala and Khalil in the lead roles. A Gujarati film titled Sati Jasma Odan was directed by Chandrakant Sanghani in 1976. The songs of the film were penned by Kanti Ashok and music was composed by Mahesh Naresh.

== See also ==
- Sahastralinga Tank
