= Bhava Brihaspati =

12th-century Hindu ascetic and teacher

Bhava Brihaspati was a 12th-century ascetic of Pashupata sect of Hinduism. He was the teacher of Paramara kings of Malwa and Chaulukya king Jayasimha Siddharaja.

Born into city of Varanasi, in a Kanyakubja Brahmin family, he left his home and migrated to Malwa and temporarily resided in Dhara and in Ujjain. There he superintended the Shaiva monasteries, gained certain Paramara chieftains for the Shaiva faith and wrote a textbook on explaining about doctrines of Pashupata Shaivism.

After a time, Brihaspati exhorted Chaulukya ruler Kumarapala to restore the decayed Somnath temple. The king readily agreed, made Brihaspati the lord of all Shaiva temple-priests in his dominions, bestowed presents of ornaments, two elephants and pearl-necklaces and entrusted to him the governorship of Somnathpattan.

== Somnathpattan Prashasti inscription ==
The object of this inscription from the 12th century at Somnath temple is to celebrate the virtues of the Bhava Brihaspati and to hand down to posterity a record of his great deeds. The poet boldly asserts that Brihaspati was an incarnation of Shiva's attendant Nandishwara, who assumed a mortal body in order to insure the restoration of the god's sanctuary at Somnathpattan.

The 9th paragraph of the inscription states:

That man [Bhava Brihaspati] of saintly disposition, being reminded by Shambhu of the cause of his descent into the world, turned his mind towards [the accomplishment of] its object, the renovation of the (sacred) locality. Even on that same day illustrious Siddharaja, joining his hands in supplication, bestowed on him out of great regard an unequalled greatness and honour.

A later inscription, referring to Bhava Brihaspati, states:

Lord Shiva, observing that dharma was disappearing under the rule of bad kings in the Kaliyuga, decided that his abode should be repaired. Shiva reincarnated a part of himself and took birth as Bhava Brihaspati in the family of a Kanyakubja Brahmin.
