= Sahasralinga Tank =

Coordinates: 23°51′45″N 72°05′50″E

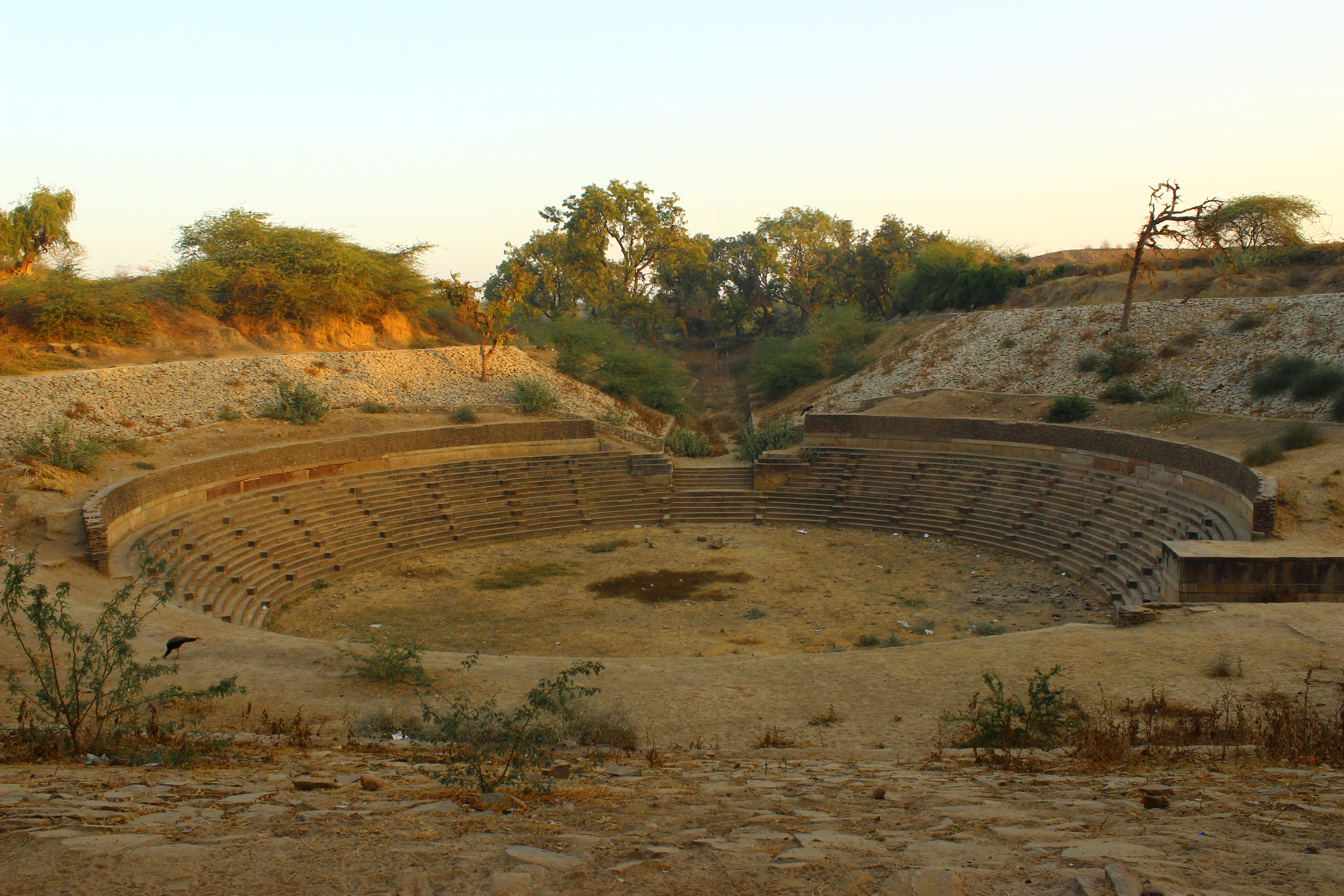
Sahasralinga Talav Artificial water tank

Sahasralinga Tank or Sahasralinga Talav is a now-defunct medieval artificial water tank in Patan, Gujarat, India that was commissioned during the Chaulukya (Solanki) dynasty. It is a Monument of National Importance protected by the Archaeological Survey of India (N-GJ-161).

== History ==
Sahasralinga Tank is one of many artificial tanks built in different parts of Gujarat under the patronage of Gujurati king Jayasimha Siddharaja. Prior to the Sahasralinga Tank, the site was occupied by the smaller tank Durlabh Sarovar, built by then-king Durlabharaja. In the early 12th century, Jayasimha Siddharaja expanded and decorated the site with temples, Kunds, ghats and various other buildings, including a palace, educational institutions, and Dharma-shalas.

== Design and Architecture ==
The Sahasralinga Tank was one of the largest and grandest water tanks in size.

The lake was in rectangular form. The great embankment surrounding it is of solid brick work and was faced with stone masonry forming flights of steps to the water's edge. Water was directed from Saraswati river by a canal to this lake. Inside the canal, there was a Kupa (reservoir), called Rudra-Kupa, which was built to smooth the flow of the gushing water from the river. It was named Rudra-Kupa rightly, as it checked the flow of Saraswati river just as god Rudra (Shiva) checked the flow of river Ganga. From Rudra-Kupa, the water was diverted to Sahasralinga tank by three channels, thus it was called Triveni. On the banks of lake, numerous little temples containing over 1000 shiva-lingam were placed, which Jayasimha Siddharaja brought from Amarkantak. On all sides, temples were built, most of which are either destroyed or converted to mosques. There was image of god Vishnu on the brink of lake water.

These temples were dismantled during the late medieval period when a large octagonal rauza was raised on a part of its ruins. Near the middle of the eastern embankment are the remains of the old Shiva temple, comprising the basements of the pavilions together with a colonnade of forty eight pillars. Towards the western end, there is a basin in which water from the Saraswati river was collected and then allowed to pass into the inlet channel of the Sahasralinga Tank. This cistern is about forty meters in diameter.

Many tirths were located on the banks of the lake:

- Dasavmedh Tirth.
- Jaangal Tirth
- Devi Tirth
- Vindhyavasini Tirth
- Dashavtar Tirth
- Prabhas Tirh
- Temple of Lakulish
- Reva Tirth
- Vinayak Tirth
- Swami Tirth
- Pishach-Mochan Tirth
- Surya Tirth
- Kolla Tirth
- Kapalisha Tirth
- Gandharva Tirth
- Varah Tirth
- Durga Tirth
- Matr Tirth

Sahasralinga lake was used for irrigation and other purposes by residents of Patan.

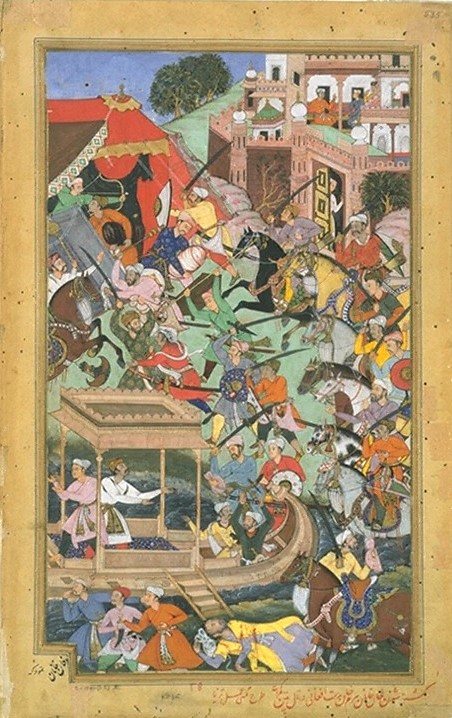
Bairam Khan is assassinated by an Afghan at Patan, 1561, Akbarnama

=== Destruction of the lake ===
In the early 14th century, Patan was attacked by Alf Khan, general of the Khalji dynasty. The temples along the banks suffered damage but the lake survived. Until the reign of Akbar, the lake survived in good condition as Bairam Khan, Akbar's tutor, while passing through Patan on his way to Mecca, was said to have been murdered after he returned from boating in this tank in 1561.

The temples were destroyed and paved embankments of the lake were removed over time. It is suspected that due to heavy flood in river Saraswati, the city was submerged and the lake was destroyed. One of the banks of the lake towards the city is called Phati Padno Pol, which indicates the lake might have burst out from this side.

=== Legend ===
Jasma Odan, a wife of Rooda who belonged to the Od community of tank diggers, cursed Chaulukya ruler Jayasimha Siddharaja who, captivated by her beauty, proposed marriage to her. Due to the curse, the tank would not fill with water. To repeal the curse, a human sacrifice was needed. Mayo or Mahya(Jay Vir Maghmaya), from the lower caste Vankar community, sacrificed himself resulting in water filling the tank. Jaysimha, out of gratitude, allowed his caste to stay with higher castes in town.

This legend of Jasma Odan is untrue. The fragmentary inscription on Bijal Mahadeo Kuan in Patan, which was originally inscribed on Kirtistambha that once stood on the banks of this lake in Patan, mentions that the water was directed to this lake to fill the lake for irrigation and other purposes since the lake's original water source wasn't enough to fill the lake. Similar instances have been noted to fill the lakes by river water, Karna Sagar near Modhera, Ana Sagar in Ajmer through waters of Chandra Nahar.

== Gallery ==
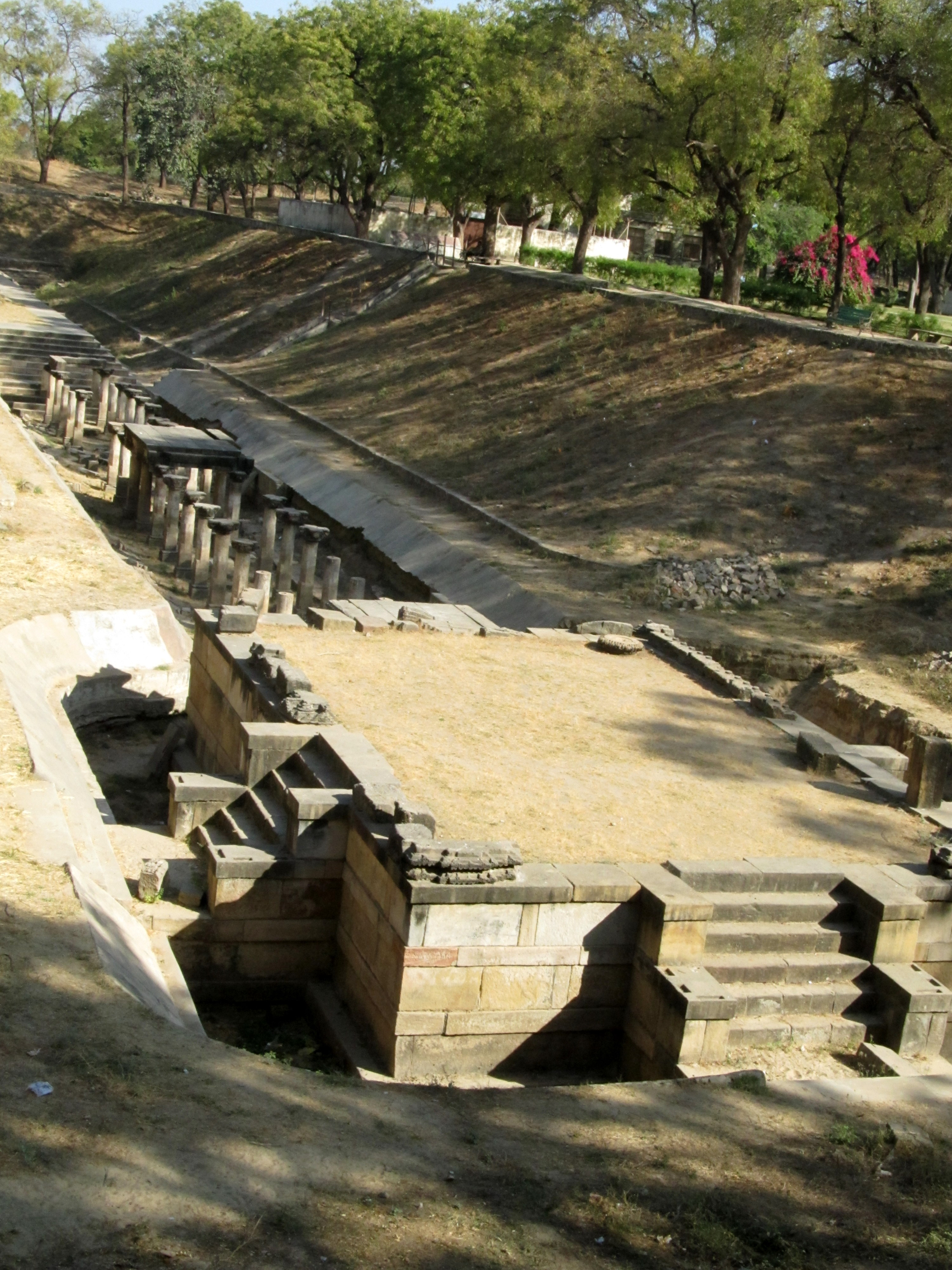
Sahastralinga Tank Platform

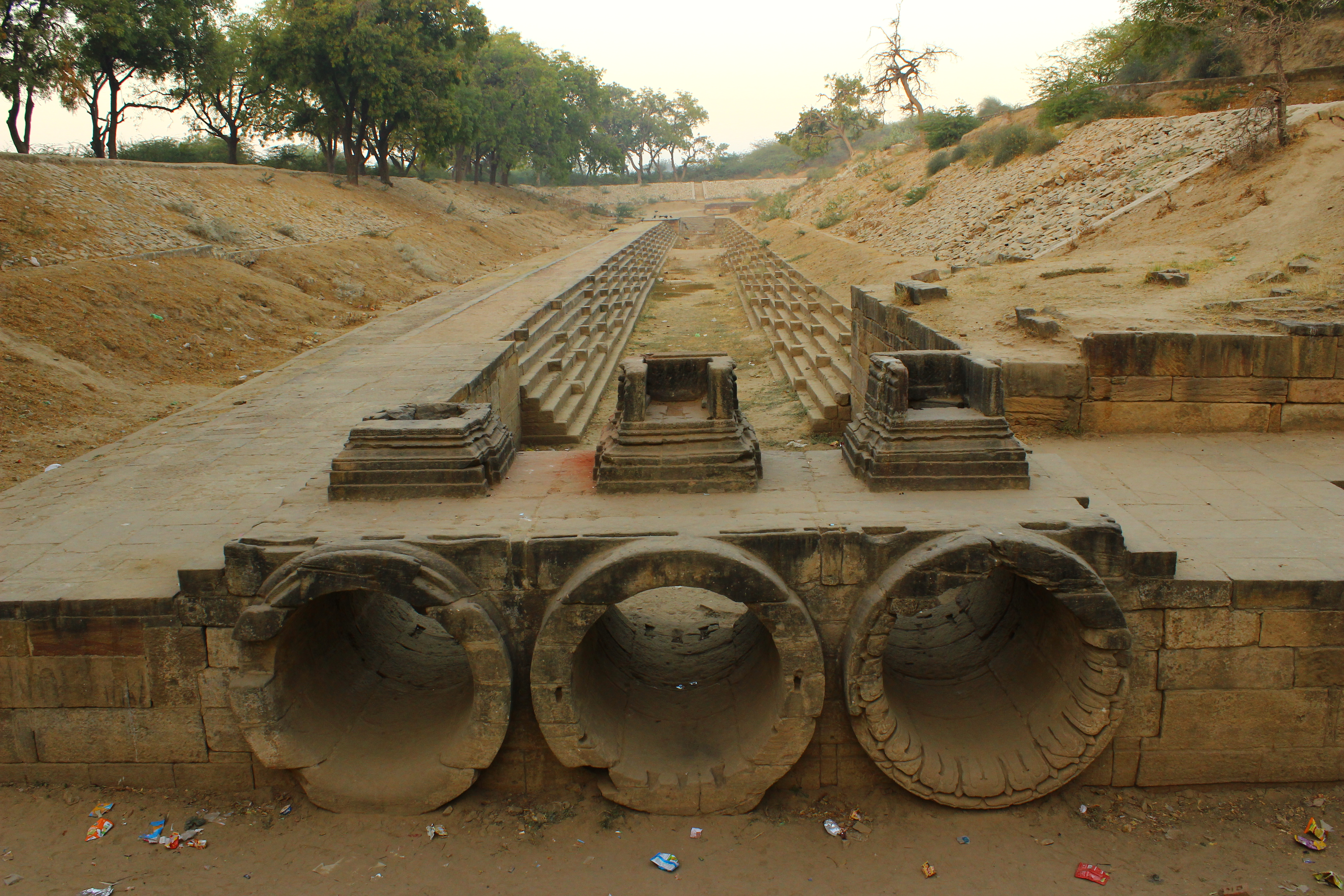
Water Inlets

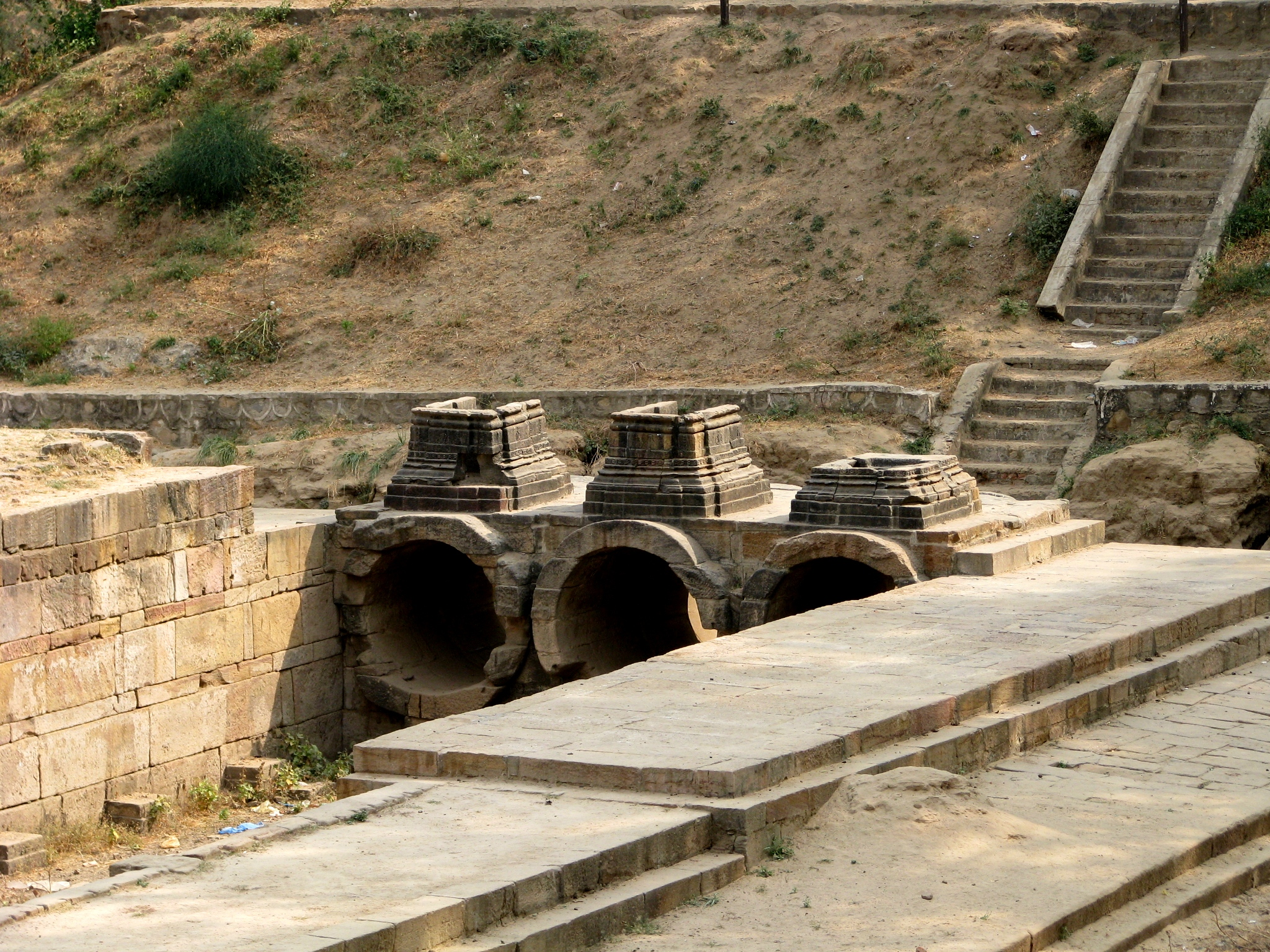
Water inlets

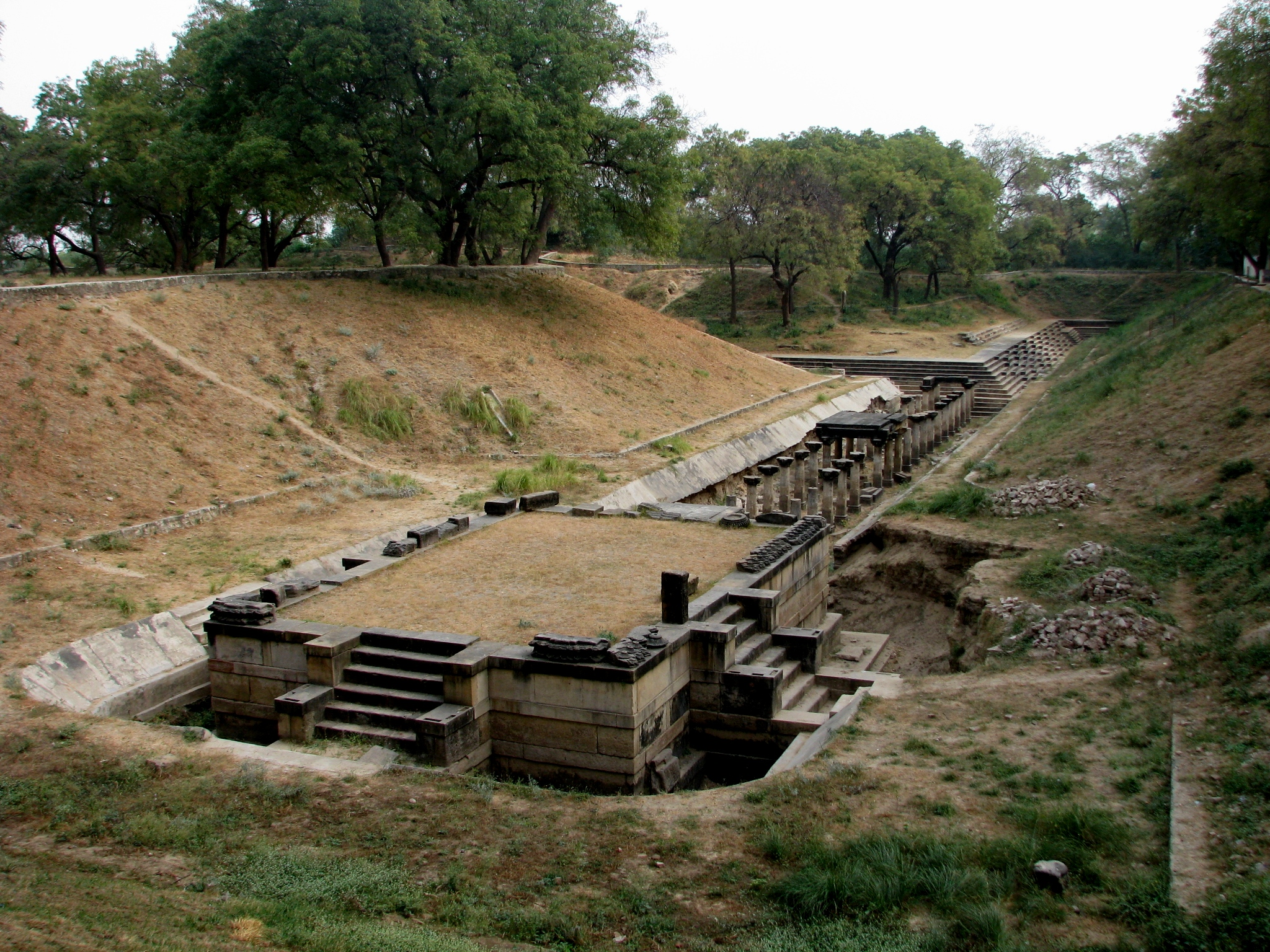
Platform

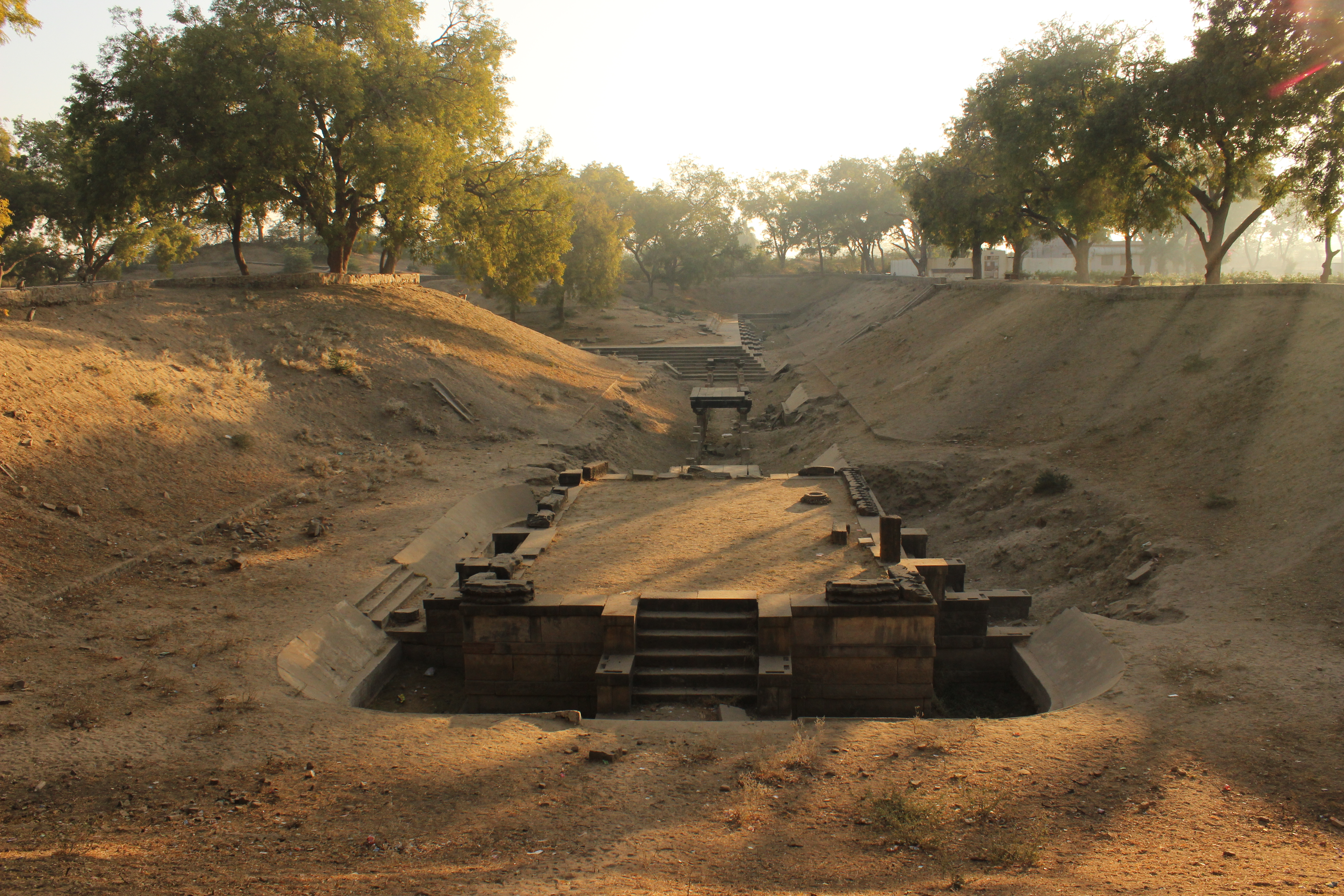
Platform

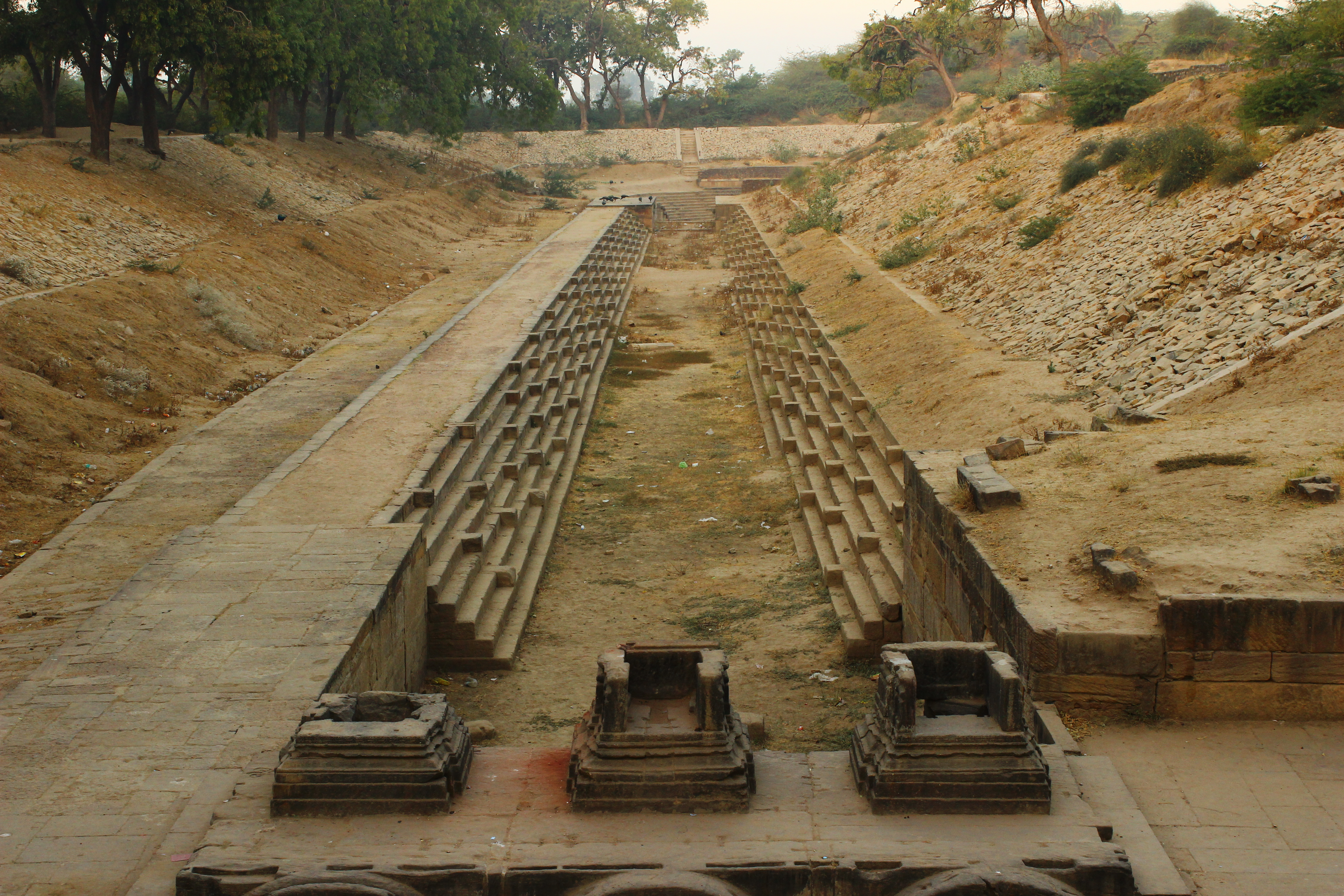
Canal of Water tank (Lake)

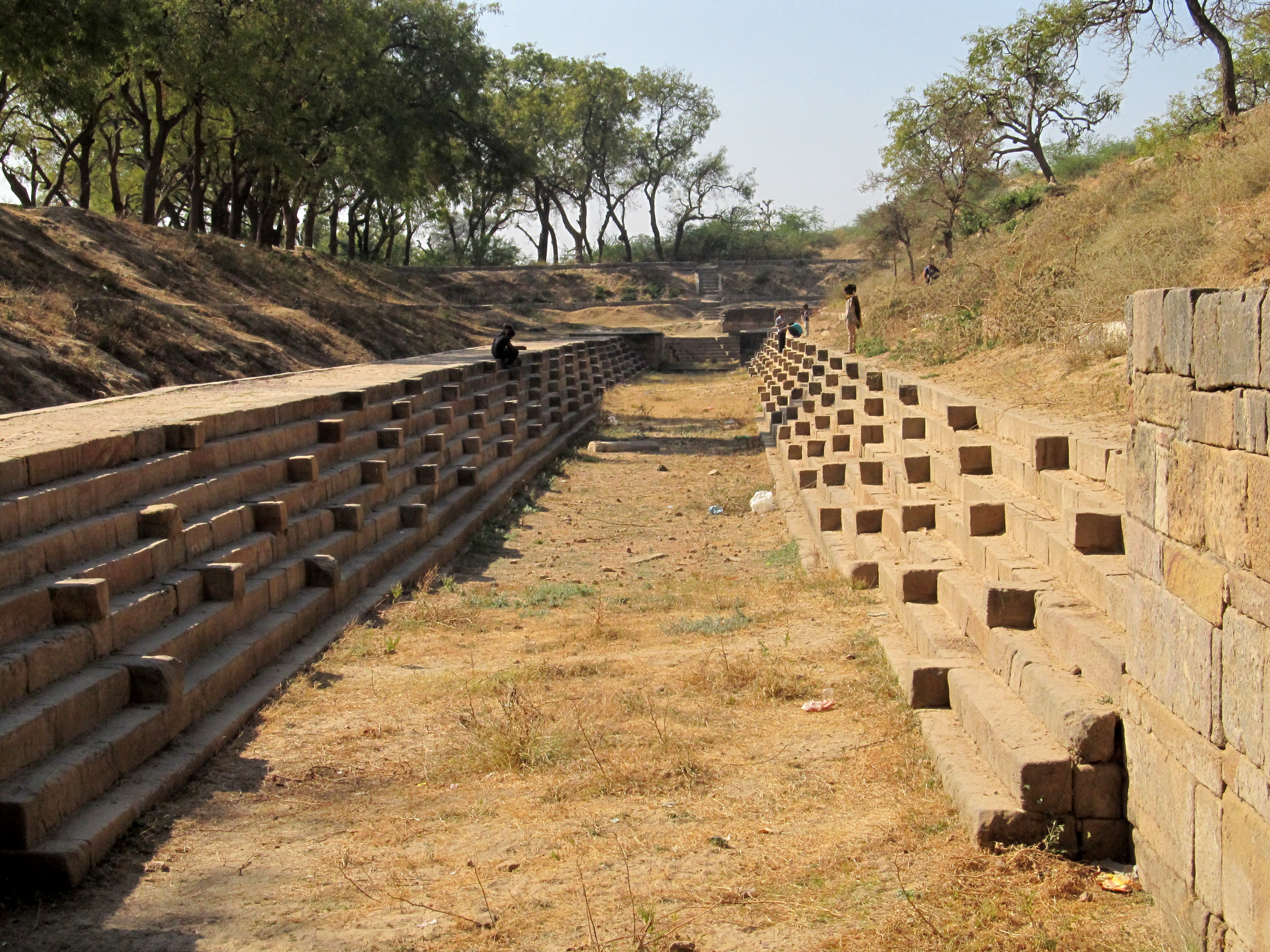
Channel

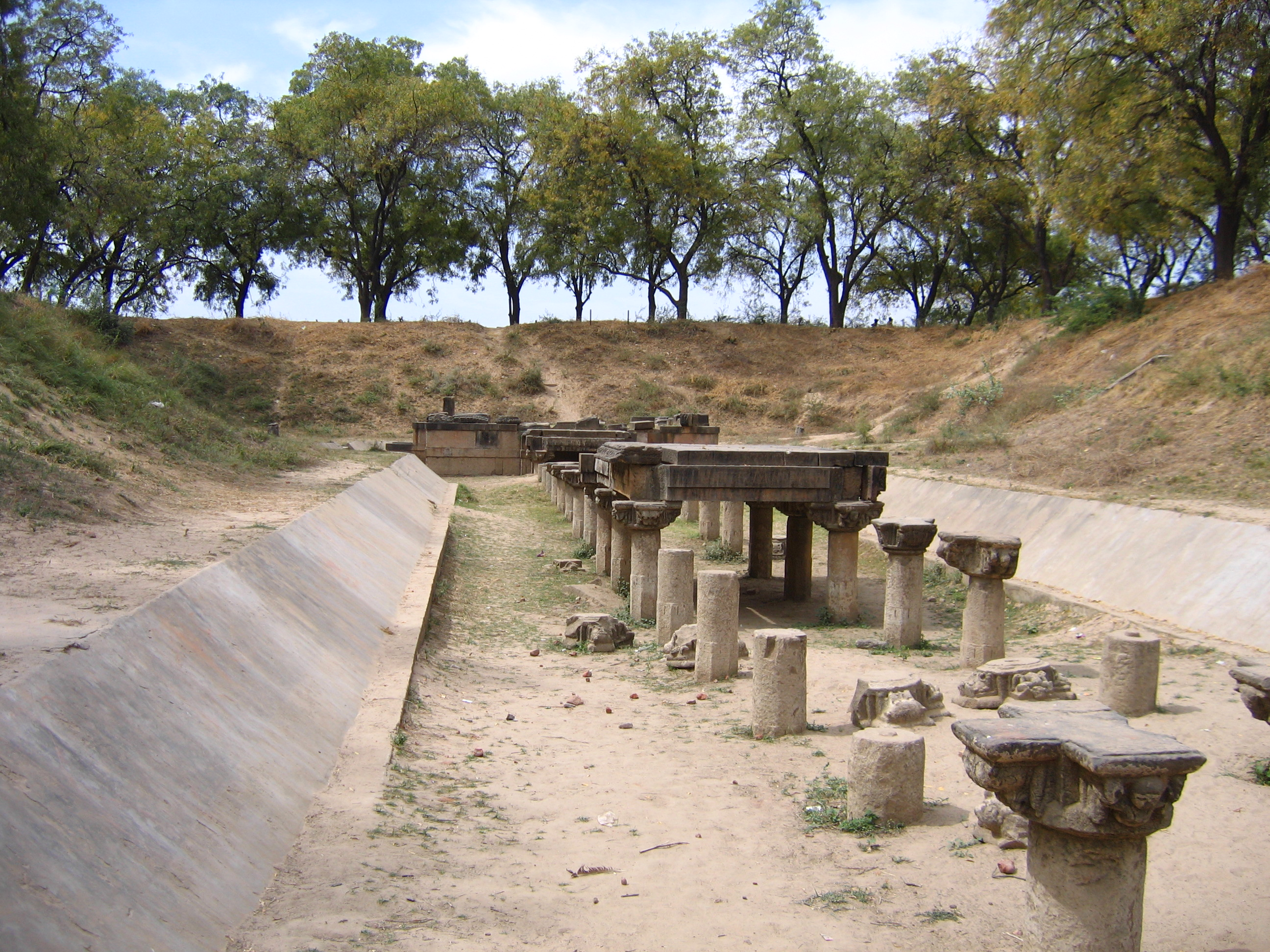
Ruined pillars

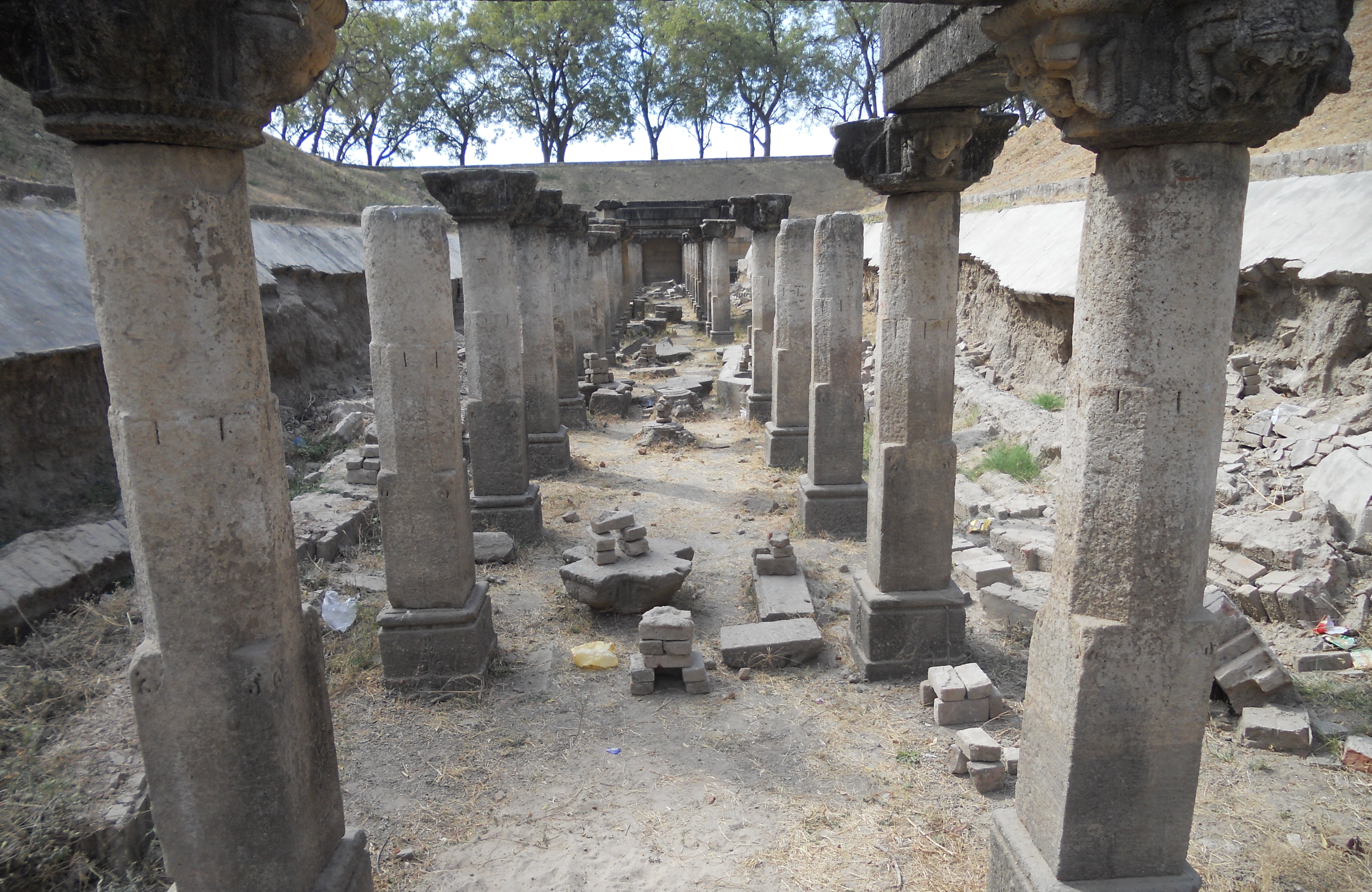
Ruined pillars

== See also ==
- Jasma Odan
- Patan, Gujarat

== Spelling confusion ==
Sahasra is the correct suffix that means "a thousand", not SahasTra. However, it is invariably misspelled as the latter. Notice how the same suffix is spelled when it occurs in family names (example: Sahasrabuddhe) without a T. The confusion arises because the Hindi letter "Sa" (स) merges with "ra" (र) and looks like "tra".
