= Bahuk =

Gujarati long narrative poem by Chinu Modi (1983)

- Long narrative poem based on Mahabharata
- by Chinu Modi
- Coverpage
- Written: 1982
- First published in: January 1983
- Illustrator: Shailesh Modi
- Cover artist: Kurang Mehta
- Country: India
- Language: Gujarati
- Form: Metrical and Nonmetrical verse
- Meter: Sanskrit prosody
- Publisher: Adarsha Prakashan, Ahmedabad
- Media type: Print (paperback)
- Lines: 3 cantos, 50 chapters
- Pages: 152
- ISBN: 978-93-82593-79-9
- OCLC: 249677342
- Preceded by: Aansu Maro Chhinna Ansha
- Followed by: Kaalakhyan

Bahuk (Gujarati: બાહુક) is a Gujarati long narrative poem by Chinu Modi. The poem is composed both in metrical and non-metrical verse and centres on Nala, a character from the Mahabharata who metamorphosed into Bahuka. It is an acclaimed poem of Gujarati literature written in Sanskrit-styled figurative language. The poem was selected for the Ushnas Prize (1982–83) by the Gujarati Sahitya Parishad.

== Background and publication history ==
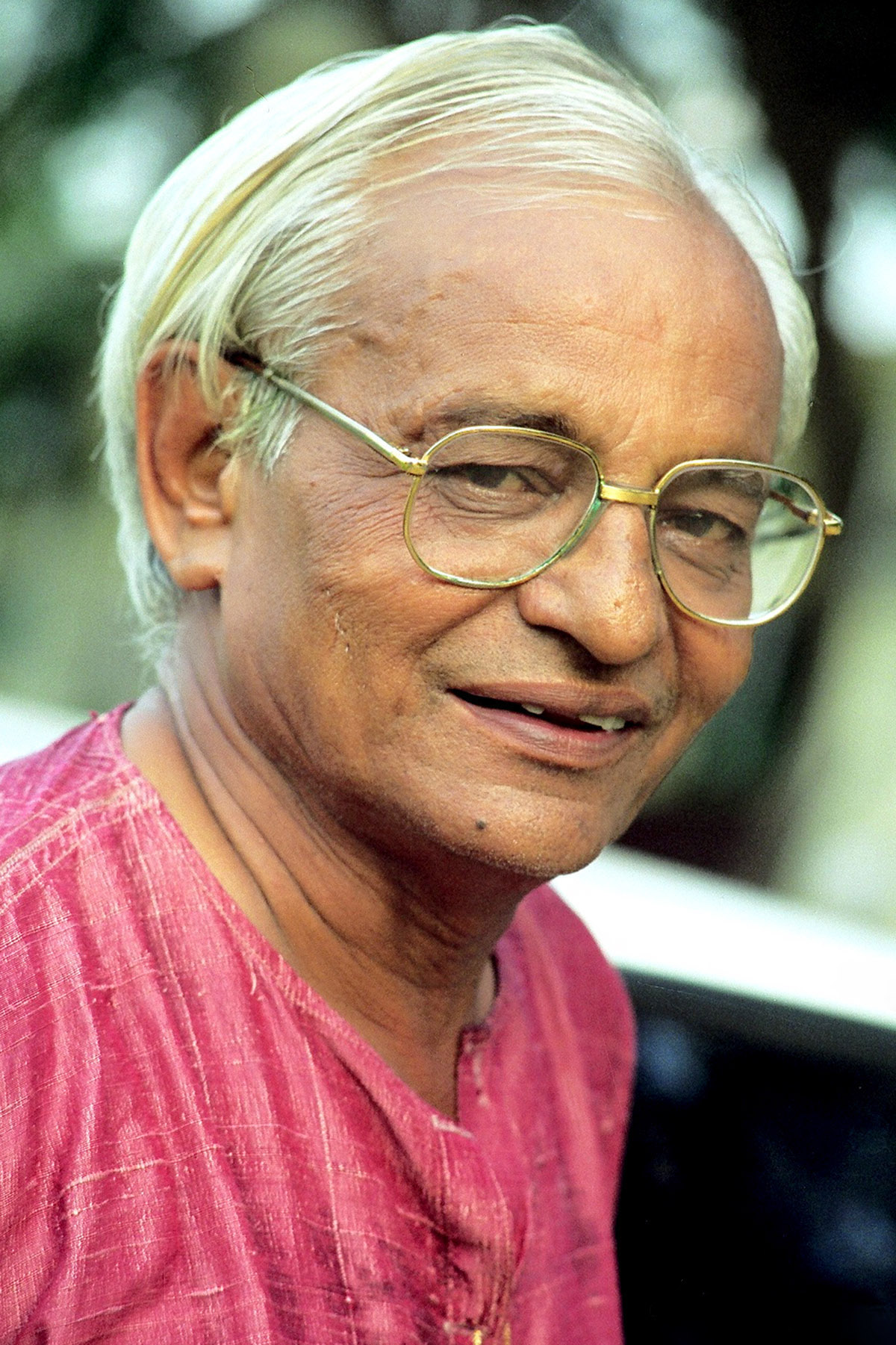
Chinu Modi

Chinu Modi began writing Bahuk in 1971. He suspended work between 1979 and 1981, on receiving a creative fellowship from the Department of Culture in Delhi, before going on to complete the poem in October 1982. Bahuk was published in book form in January 1983 by Adarsh Publication, Ahmedabad, and reprinted in 1999. A third edition, including critical articles, was published in October 2014.

== Characters ==
- Nala, the king of Nishadnagar, who lost his empire to his brother Pushkara in a bet.
- Damayanti, princess of the Vidarbha Kingdom and wife of Nala.
- Brihadashwa, a sage.

During his exile, Pandava king Yudhishthira asked Brihadashwa, "Is there any other emperor in this wood who is unfortunate as me?". At that time, Brihadashwa consoled him by narrating the story of Nala and Damayanti. In Modi's poem, the sage Brihadashwa comes into his own as an independent character and observer.

== Theme ==
The subject of the poem is the story of Nala and Damayanti from chapter 27 chapter of the Vana Parva, third parva (book) of the Mahabharata. The poem's central theme is the psyche and subtle emotions of Nala, and of his wife Damayanti. After losing his empire to his brother Pushkara in a bet, Nala spends three days and nights outside his city, Nishadnagar, with Damayanti, before going into the forest. Cut off from his city, Nala feels extreme loneliness. The poem depicts the dissolution of his personality during these three days and nights.

== Structure and techniques ==
The poem is divided into three sarga (cantos). The first contains 15 chapters, the second 13 chapters, and the third 22 chapters. The three characters do not communicate with each other but speak in independent monologues.

The chronological order of narrator monologues is as follows:

- Sarga 1 : Brihadashwa, Nala, Damayanti
- Sarga 2 : Brihadashwa, Nala, Damayanti
- Sarga 3 : Damayanti, Brihadashwa, Nala

The first and second sargas are composed in non-metrical verse. The third is composed in accordance with the rules of Sanskrit-vritta (Sanskrit prosody) and Matra-vritta, including Prithvi, Vasantatilka, Mandakranta, Shikhrini, Chopai and Katav. The poem is structured using Sanskrit-styled and figurative language. The narrative comprises long monologues from the three characters, Nala, Damayanti, and Brihadashwa. Brihadashwa and Damayanti's monologues centre alternately on Nala and his psyche, reflecting the affection they hold for Nala. The poet reinterprets the two accounts in the original story, "Karkotaka dankh" ("The sting of Karkotaka") and "Matsya Sajivan Prasang". In the original story, a bite from the snake Karkotaka transforms Nala into Bahuka. In the poem, Chinu Modi describes Nala's metamorphosis into Bahuka as being caused by natural phenomena.

== Synopsis ==
=== Sarga 1 ===
The first sarga (canto) begins with three visions of Brihadashwa: the arrival of victorious Pushkara in the town Nishadanagar; the citizens' fear at his arrival; and victorious Pushkara's emotions and Nala's numbness. There follows a description of Nala's despair at being cut off from his city. The sarga concludes with Damayanti's thoughts and feelings on Nala's situation.

=== Sarga 2 ===
The second sarga begins with Brihadashwa's address to the Vrukharaj (a banyan tree) and some other elements of nature at the border of Nishadanagar concerning Nala's mental state. Nala's monologue follows, reflecting his stillness, his passivity and lifelessness, and his growing consciousness of these things. Finally, Damayanti's monologue reveals her own state of mind in certain lines, with the remainder concerning Nala. Damayanti addresses Nala, attempting to rouse him from his numbed state. The entire monologue uses the technique of Indication.

=== Sarga 3 ===
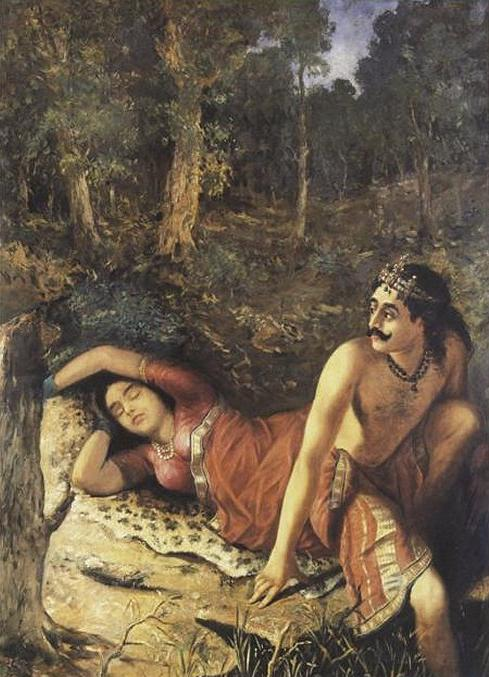
Nala leaving Damayanthi while she is sleeping; painting by Raja Ravi Varma

The third sarga begins with Damayanti's monologue describing Nala's mental state through the symbol of the banyan tree Vruksharaj and other elements of nature. Damayanti attempts to convince Nala to accept his new situation. Brihadashva's monologue follows, describing Nala's situation using natural imagery such as darkness and the forest. At the beginning of the final monologue, by Nala, Nala finds a golden, fleshy bird. Hungry, he finds the bird fit to eat. This is the point at which his transformation into Bahuka commences. He makes a snare out of his only cloth to catch the bird, but it flies away carrying the cloth. Nala is left naked and feels his individuality dissolving, with a deep sense of grief. Finally, Nala turns into Bahuka, not as a result of the snake Karkotaka's bite as in the original story in the Mahabharata, but through the sting of loneliness. He leaves Damayanti and wanders away into the forest. The episode that begins with Nala's desire to kill the bird closes with Nala leaving Damayanti, revealing his uglier side. The Nala of the poem is written as a displaced person.

== Award ==
The book was awarded the Ushnas Prize (1982–83) by the Gujarati Sahitya Parishad (Gujarati Literary Council).

== Critical response ==
The poem has been critically acclaimed by several Gujarati authors. Harivallabh Bhayani noted that Chinu Modi has broken new ground in modern Gujarati long narrative poetry (Khandakavya) with his attempts at narrative poems. Chandrakant Topiwala observed: "In Gujarati literature, poets like Ravji Patel, and Raghuvir Chaudhari have written poem on separation from village when they moved from village to city. But here for the first time, Chinu Modi has grabbed the opportunity to writing on separation from the city as the lead character is separated from the city and moving to woods." In this, he has described the pain of personal separation in a modern context. However, in one article Pramodkumar Patel questioned the psychological role and the truthfulness and authenticity of the emotions of the character Damayanti. He noted that Damayanti's behavior runs counter to reality in some instances in the poem.

== Translation and adaptation ==
Chinu Modi adapted the poem as two-act Gujarati play in 1991. In the production, Himanshu Trivedi played the role of Nala and Asma Dalal played Damayanti. The poem was translated into Hindi by Kavita Sharma as Jadli in 2017.
