= Nala and Damayanti =

Episode from the Indian epic Mahabharata

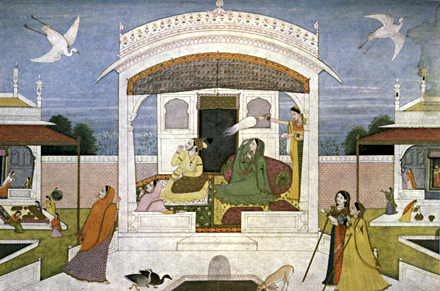
Pahari painting depicting Nala and Damayanti, 18th century

Nala and Damayanti, also known as Nalopakhyana (Sanskrit title: नलोपाख्यान Nalopākhyāna, i.e., "Episode of Nala"), is an episode from the Indian epic Mahabharata. It is about King Nala and his wife Damayanti: Nala loses his kingdom in a game of dice and has to go into exile with his faithful wife Damayanti in the forest, where he leaves her. Separated from each other, the two have many adventures before they are finally reunited and Nala regains his kingdom.

Nala and Damayanti is one of the best-known and most popular episodes of the Mahabharata. It has found a wide reception in India and is also regarded in the West as one of the most valuable works of Indian literature.

== Content ==
The Mahabharata, a huge work of over 100,000 double verses, contains a large number of side episodes, some of which are nested within one another, in addition to the main story, which tells of the battle between the Pandavas and Kauravas, two related princely families. Alongside the religious-philosophical didactic poem Bhagavad Gita and the Savitri legend, Nala and Damayanti is one of the best known of these episodes. It occurs in Aranyakaparvan, the third of 18 books of the epic and comprises around 1100 double verses (shlokas) in 26 chapters.

In the main narrative, Yudhishthira, the eldest of the five Pandava brothers, has just lost his kingdom to the Kauravas in a game of dice and had to go into exile with his brothers for twelve years. There, Yudhishtira meets the seer Brihadashva and asks him if there has ever been a more unfortunate man than himself, whereupon Brihadashva tells him the story of Nala, who also lost his kingdom in the dice game, but eventually regained it.

=== Summary ===
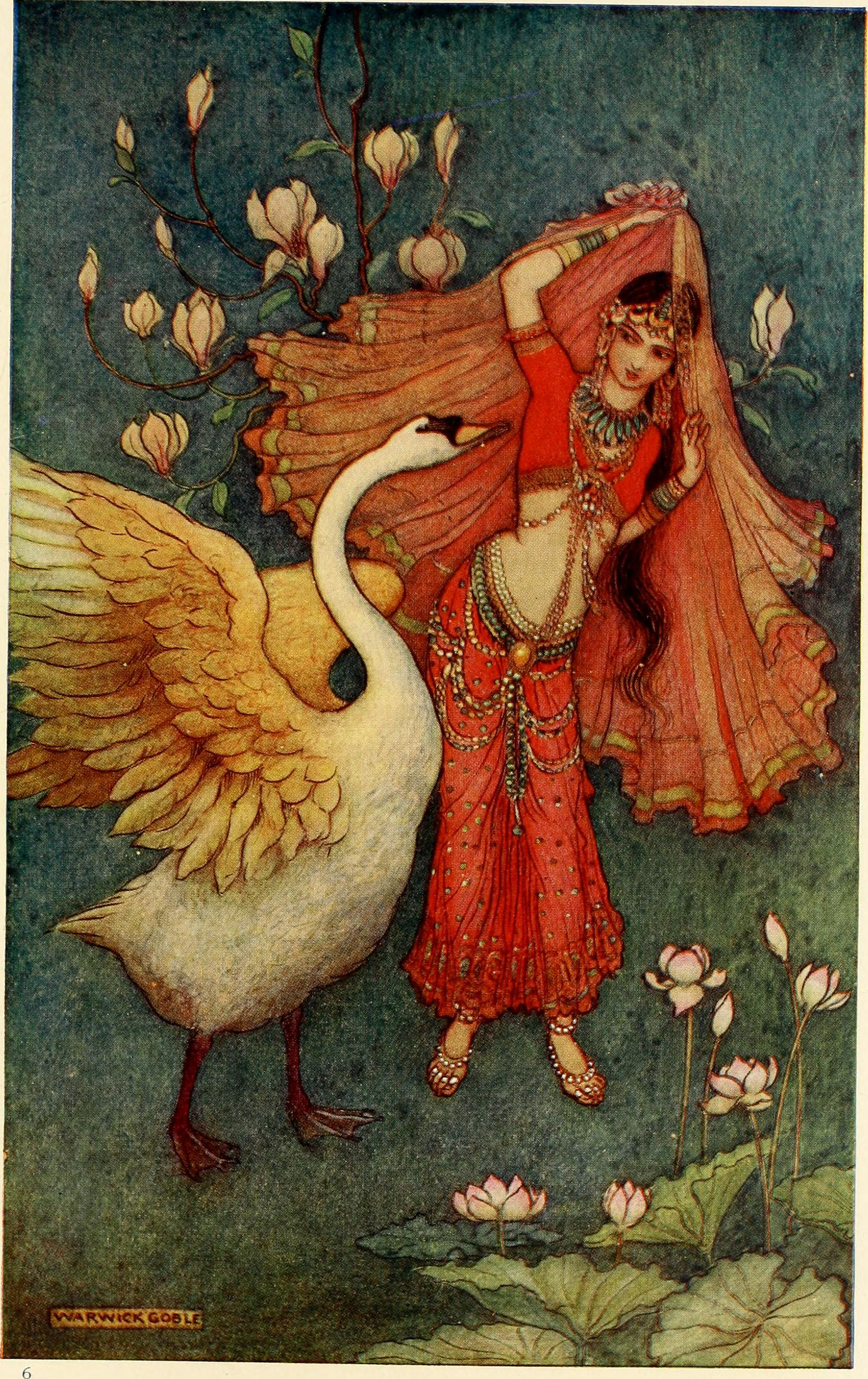
Damayanti encounters the golden swan, 1913 illustration

Nala, the handsome, virtuous and heroic son of Virasena, is king of Nishadha. At the same time, the beautiful Damayanti lives in Vidarbha at the court of her father, King Bhima. Bhima was once childless until the seer Damana granted him the boon of three sons and a daughter. Nala and Damayanti hear of each other's virtues through songs and stories, and they fall in love despite never having met. One day, Nala captures a hamsa (wild goose or swan), which promises to convey his feelings to Damayanti. When Damayanti encounters the same goose, it speaks to her of Nala, further deepening her affection. Later, Damayanti begins to behave unusually, prompting concern among her companions, who report the matter to her father, King Bhima.

In response, Bhima arranges a svayamvara—a traditional ceremony for a bride to choose her husband—and invites suitors from many kingdoms. Meanwhile, the sages Narada and Parvata visit the god Indra, who laments that no kings are dying in battle. Narada explains that the princes are instead preoccupied with attending Damayanti's svayamvara. Intrigued, the gods Indra, Agni, Varuna and Yama decide to attend the event. Upon seeing Nala, they elect to enlist him as their messenger to Damayanti. Reluctantly, Nala agrees to act as the envoy and visits Damayanti in her private chamber. He reveals his divine commission and urges her to choose one of the gods as her husband. However, Damayanti is resolute in her desire to marry Nala and declares her intention to do so. Nala returns to the gods and reports her decision.

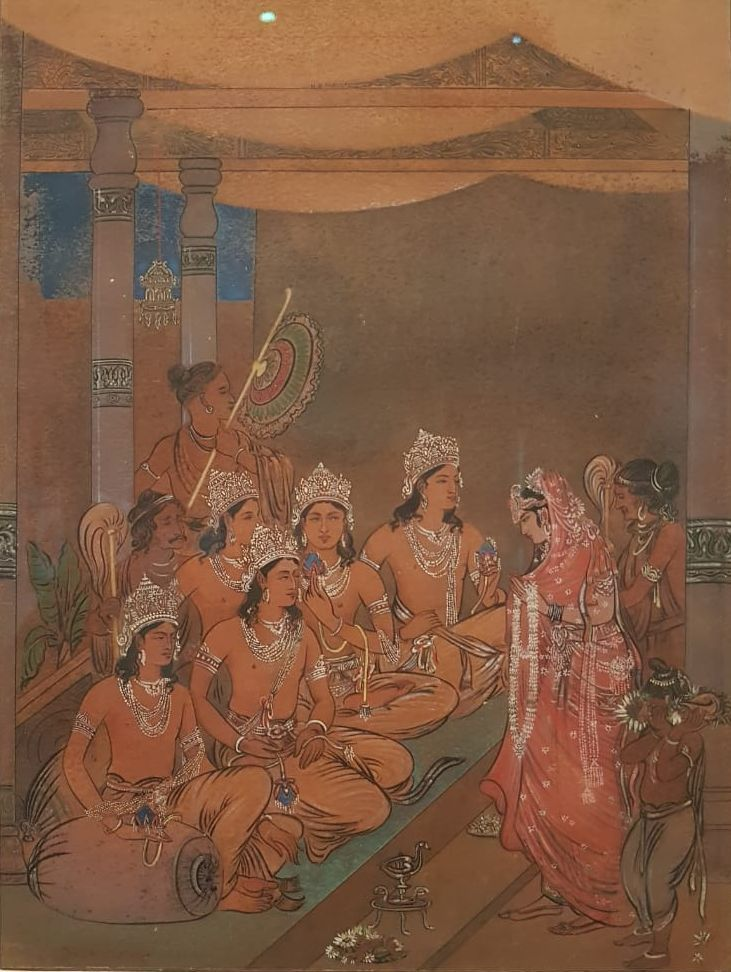
Damayanti choosing her husband from a group of suitors who all appear to be Nala. Painting by Nandalal Bose.

At the svayamvara, the gods take on Nala's appearance, creating confusion for Damayanti. In desperation, she appeals to the gods, swearing by her sincerity and purity. Moved by her truthfulness, the gods resume their divine forms, enabling her to identify and choose Nala. In gratitude, the gods bestow various boons: Indra grants that he may always appear at sacrifices; Agni ensures Nala's immediate access to fire and immunity from it; Yama grants a refined palate and adherence to righteousness; and Varuna ensures the presence of water and bestows a garland. As the gods return from the svayamvara, they encounter Kali and Dvāpara. Upon learning that Nala has won Damayanti, Kali becomes enraged and vows to possess him, while Dvāpara resolves to enter the dice, setting the stage for Nala's downfall. Nala and Damayanti are married and live together in happiness. The couple also receives the blessing of twin children.

Twelve years later, Nala becomes spiritually defiled, allowing Kali to take possession of him. Nala's brother, Pushkara, challenges him to a game of dice, and under the influence of Kali and Dvāpara, Nala begins to lose repeatedly. Despite protests from the citizens, Nala continues to wager and ignore their pleas. Encouraged by Damayanti, the citizens again attempt to intervene, but their efforts are unsuccessful. Anticipating worse to come, Damayanti instructs Nala's charioteer, Varshneya, to take their twin children to her father's court in Vidarbha for safety. Eventually, Nala loses all of his possessions in the game—everything but Damayanti. Clothed in a single garment, he departs the city, with Damayanti following him. The couple camps outside the city for three nights. When golden-feathered birds approach, Nala throws his cloth over them in an attempt to catch them. However, the birds—actually transformed dice—fly off with the garment. Nala is distraught and suggests that Damayanti return to her parents. She refuses, urging instead that they remain together.

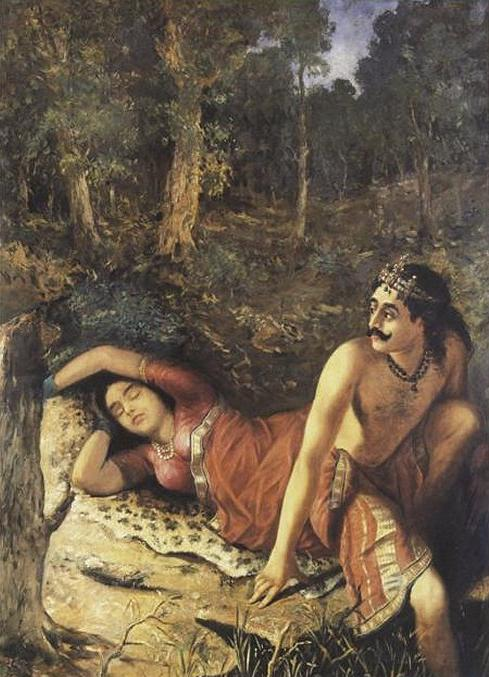
Nala deserts Damayanti in the forest

Despite her protests, Nala, driven by guilt and pride, decides to part from her for her own safety. They take shelter in a lodge where Nala wrestles with his conscience. Although he returns multiple times, Kali ultimately overcomes him, and Nala flees under the cover of darkness. When Damayanti discovers his absence, she mourns deeply and curses the force behind his suffering. While wandering, she is briefly seized by a python, but is rescued by a hunter. However, the hunter tries to rape her, prompting Damayanti to curse him, resulting in his death. Alone, Damayanti continues her journey through the forest, expressing her grief in lamentation. She speaks to a tiger and later a mountain, but receives no solace. After three days, she discovers a hermitage. The ascetics there console her and predict a reunion with Nala before mysteriously vanishing. She continues onward, questioning an ashoka tree. Eventually, she reaches a riverbank where she finds a passing caravan and joins it. After traveling for many days with a caravan, Damayanti finds herself in peril when the group is attacked at night by a herd of elephants. She survives the attack and continues her journey, eventually arriving in the city of the Chedis. There, the queen mother notices her and, struck by her demeanor, offers her a position as a chambermaid. Damayanti agrees to take the position but sets specific conditions regarding her dignity and conduct.

Meanwhile, Nala, still wandering the forest, rescues a snake-king, Karkotaka, trapped in a wildfire. In gratitude, the snake transforms Nala into a hunchback, disguising his true identity, and at the same time administers poison to weaken Kali, who still possesses him. The snake advises Nala to seek employment with King Rituparna of Ayodhya. Nala follows this advice and gains a position at Rituparna's court under the assumed name Bahuka. Each night, he recites a sorrowful verse, the meaning of which he keeps partially veiled, offering only cryptic explanations when asked.

At the same time, Damayanti's father, King Bhima, dispatches brahmins across the land to search for his daughter and Nala. One of them, the brahmin Sudeva, eventually arrives in Chedi and recognizes Damayanti. He greets her and informs the queen mother, who in turn makes further inquiries. Upon learning Damayanti's identity, the queen mother reveals that Damayanti is her niece. Damayanti requests assistance in returning home, and soon makes her way back to Vidarbha. At the urging of Damayanti and her mother, King Bhima sends out another group of brahmins to search specifically for Nala. Damayanti provides them with a set of verses to recite publicly in hopes of drawing him out. The brahmins travel extensively, and one of them, Parnada, returns with promising news. He had visited Ayodhya and recited the verses, which prompted Bahuka—Nala in disguise—to respond with a verse of his own, subtly identifying himself. Without informing her father, Damayanti secretly sends Sudeva back to Ayodhya with a message announcing a second svayamvara, designed as a ruse to draw Nala out.

Upon hearing of the new svayamvara, King Rituparna instructs Bahuka to drive him to Vidarbha within a single day. Though reluctant, Bahuka selects a team of horses for the journey. Rituparna questions his choices, but ultimately defers. The chariot journey proceeds with extraordinary speed, nearly taking flight. During the ride, Varshneya, who now serves Rituparna and was once Nala's charioteer, begins to suspect that Bahuka may indeed be Nala in disguise. During the rapid journey to Vidarbha, King Rituparna's shawl slips from the chariot but cannot be retrieved due to their speed. Along the way, the king observes a vibhitaka tree and immediately counts its fruit with remarkable accuracy. Bahuka, intrigued, verifies the count and then requests to learn this numerical skill, which enhances one's ability in dice games. In return, he offers to share his expertise in horse mastery. Rituparna agrees, and as a result of this exchange, Kali is expelled from Nala and enters the vibhitaka tree.

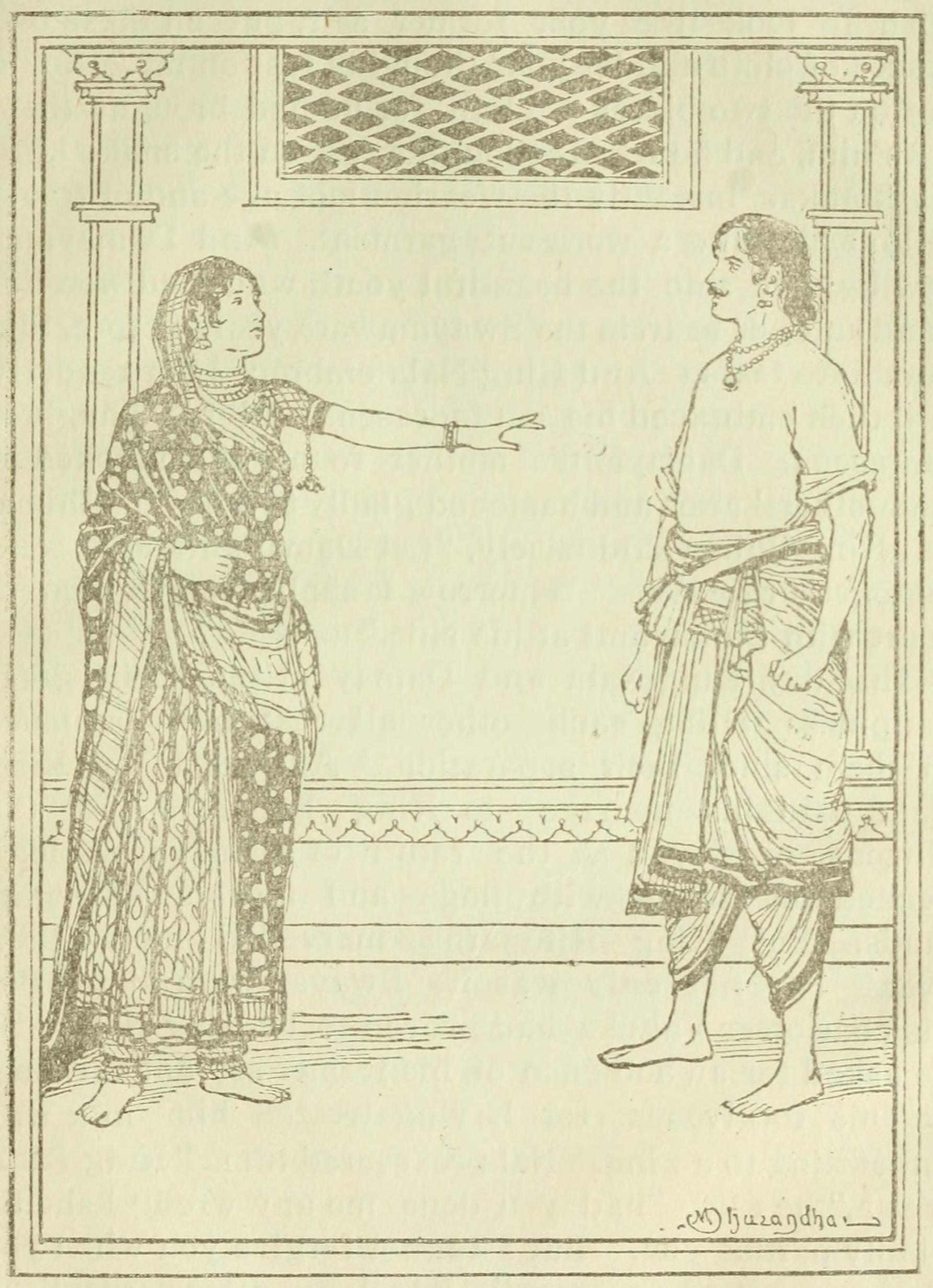
Damayanti confronts Nala, illustration by MV Dhurandhar

Meanwhile, Damayanti hears the distinctive sound of the approaching chariot and senses that it is Nala who is driving it. Her father, King Bhima, is confused by Rituparna's sudden arrival, particularly as there are no signs of a planned svayamvara. Still uncertain, Damayanti dispatches her servant Keshini to investigate Bahuka. Keshini approaches Bahuka and recites the verses composed by Damayanti; in response, he answers with the corresponding verses once spoken by Nala. She reports this back to Damayanti, who then sends her again to discover more about Bahuka's characteristics. Keshini observes several divine signs: the door lintel rises for him, fire and water are instantly present, and his garland remains unfaded. Damayanti then requests that Bahuka prepare a meal for her; upon tasting it, she recognizes it as identical to Nala's cooking. Keshini also brings Nala's children to him, prompting Bahuka to break into tears. Convinced of his identity, Damayanti has Bahuka brought before her. She expresses her anguish and sorrow. Nala explains that his actions were the result of being possessed by Kali and also questions the intent behind the new svayamvara. Damayanti clarifies that it was a ruse to find him and asserts her continued purity. Her chastity is confirmed by the wind god Vayu. With this reassurance, Nala's true form is restored, and the couple reunites after three years of separation.

Nala and Damayanti are warmly received by King Bhima. Rituparna congratulates Nala and, in a gesture of reconciliation, Nala grants him the gift of his horsemanship before Rituparna departs. With an escort, Nala returns to Nishadha and challenges his brother Pushkara to a rematch in dice. Confident of victory, Pushkara accepts, hoping again to win Damayanti. This time, Nala defeats him, but magnanimously chooses to forgive Pushkara and sends him away. Nala then reclaims his kingdom. Nala lives out his life in peace and happiness.

== Classification in literary history ==
=== Analysis and interpretation ===
Nala and Damayanti comprises 26 chapters, which display an artistic and deliberate composition: Through the introduction (chapters 1–5), which tells of Nala and Damayanti's love and marriage, the plot builds up to the three main parts: The loss of the kingdom in the dice game and Nala's banishment (chapters 6–10), Damayanti's adventures in the forest (chapters 11–13) and the events leading up to the reunion of the spouses (chapters 14–21). Finally, the story culminates in the happy union of Nala and Damayanti in the closing chapters (chapters 22–26).

A turning point in the narrative is reached at the point where Nala secretly abandons the sleeping Damayanti. By abandoning his wife, who is entitled to care and protection, the king violates the commandment of "law and custom" (dharma) - a concept that plays a central role in Indian thought. Damayanti rightly complains: "Don't you know what law and custom dictate? How could you leave me in my sleep and go away after you solemnly promised me (you would not leave me)?" Nala's violation of dharma, however, allows the poet to portray Damayanti as the embodiment of the blameless wife who remains faithful to her husband even when he treats her unjustly. A very similar constellation can be found in the second great Indian epic, the Ramayana: here Sita, the wife of the hero Rama, is the epitome of the faithful wife. The motif of love in separation is very popular in Indian poetry. Alongside Nala and Damayanti and the Ramayana, it is also the subject of the most famous Indian drama, Kalidasa's Shakuntala.

The second main motif—the loss of possessions in a game of dice—also appears several times in Indian literature: in addition to the story of Nala, it also occurs in the main plot of the Mahabharata (with which the Nala episode is set in analogy) and is also found in the "Song of Dice" in the Rigveda, the oldest work of Indian literature.

=== Origin and age ===
The Mahabharata combines many different elements of different origins and ages. The Nala episode clearly proves to be a deliberate form of interpolation due to the way it is embedded—the story of Nala is told to a protagonist of the main plot. The uniformity of content and structure shows Nala and Damayanti to be originally independent heroic poetry and remnants of an old bardic tradition. Only the monologue of the Brahmin Sudeva in the 16th chapter is a later insertion and comes from the Ramayana.

The question of the age of the Nala and Damayanti episode cannot be answered with any more certainty than the age of the Mahabharata. The epic was compiled between 400 BC and 400 AD, but the material used may be much older and partly depicts circumstances of the Vedic period (ca. 1400-600 BC). Within the Mahabharata, the Nala episode is probably "one of the older, though not one of the oldest, parts". Thus, only gods of the Vedic pantheon such as Indra, Agni, Varuna and Yama appear in the story, but not younger gods such as Vishnu and Shiva.

The Nala theme first appears in Indian literature in this episode of the Mahabharata. A "King Nada from Nishidha" (Naḍa Naiṣidha), who is certainly identical to "Nala from Nishadha", already appears in the Shatapatha Brahmana. Nada is said to "carry the (god of death) Yama to the south day after day". According to this, he could have been a king who lived at that time and undertook war campaigns to the south, which in turn points to the great age of the Nala legend.

== Reception ==
=== Further use of the story ===
Nala and Damayanti has been widely received in India. Indian Kavya art poetry, which experienced a golden age in the 1st millennium AD., made use of well-known mythological material to embellish it artistically. The episode of Nala and Damayanti was also very popular. The most important adaptations of the material in chronological order are:

- The collective work Kathakosha ("Treasury of Tales"), a work of Jaina literature by an unknown author, contains numerous other tales and legends as well as a Jain adaptation of the Nala and Damayanti story.
- The art epic Nalodaya ("Success of Nala") also deals with the Nala episode. It has been handed down in four chants and was composed in the first half of the 9th century. The author is probably Ravideva, possibly Vasudeva. In the past, it was wrongly attributed to the famous poet Kalidasa.
- The Nalachampu ("Champu of Nala") belongs to the Champu genre, a mixture of artistic prose and metrical poetry. The work is also known under the title Damayantikatha ("Story of Damayanti") and was written by Trivikramabhatta (around 900).
- The Raghavanaishadhiya ("[story] of the descendant of Raghu and the king of Nishadha") by Haradatta Suri represents the genre of so-called "crooked speech" (vakrokti). Using the possibilities of double meaning available in Sanskrit, the work tells the story of Rama and Nala simultaneously in an almost linguistic acrobatic manner.
- The collection of fairy tales Kathasaritsagara ("Sea of Tales"), which was written by Somadeva between 1063 and 1081, also tells a version of the Nala story.
- The best-known adaptation is the Naishadhacharita ("Deeds of the Nishadha King"). This artistic epic describes the events leading up to Damayanti's self-election in 22 songs in an extremely artificial style. It was composed in the second half of the 12th century by Shriharsha in Kannauj.
- The 15-chant epic poem Sahridayananda also deals with the Nala and Damayanti subject matter. It was probably written in the 13th century by Krishnananda, who also wrote a commentary on the Naishadhacharita.
- Another adaptation of the story is the Nalabhyudaya, written by Vamanabhattabana in the 15th century.
- There are two adaptations of the Nala story in Tamil literature: the Nalavenba by the author Pugalendi from the 13th/14th century and the Naidadam by Adivirarama Pandiyan from the second half of the 16th century.
- The poet Faizi (1547–1595) made a Persian adaptation of the Nala story at the request of Emperor Akbar I
- The story was made into numerous films in all major Indian languages under the title Nala Damayanti, first in 1920 with a silent film by the film company Madan Theatres directed by the Italian Eugenio de Liguoro with Patience Cooper as "Damayanti".
- Nal'i Damajanti op. 47, opera in three acts by Anton Arensky, libretto by Modest Tchaikovsky (Pyotr Ilyich Tchaikovsky's brother), the Mahabharata in Vasily Zhukovsky's translation into Russian, premiere January 9 / January 22, 1904 in Moscow.

=== Reception in the West ===
In the West, Nala and Damayanti is held in high esteem as "one of the most charming creations of Indian poetry". The German writer and Indologist August Wilhelm Schlegel commented on the work as follows:

Here I will say only this much, that in my feeling this poem can hardly be surpassed in pathos and ethos, in ravishing force and tenderness of feeling. It is quite made to appeal to old and young, noble and base, the connoisseurs of art and those who merely abandon themselves to their natural senses. The tale is also infinitely popular in India, ... there the heroic loyalty and devotion of Damayantī is as famous as that of Penelope among us; and in Europe, the gathering-place of the products of all parts and ages of the world, it deserves to be so too.

Johann Wolfgang von Goethe, who showed great interest in Indian literature, was also interested in Nala and Damayanti and wrote about the story in his daily and annual journals in 1821:

I also studied Nala with admiration and only regretted that our sensibilities, customs and way of thinking had developed so differently from those of that Eastern nation that such an important work would only attract a few among us, perhaps only specialist readers.

Nala and Damayanti was one of the first works to be discovered by the emerging field of Indology in the early 19th century. In 1819, Franz Bopp published the first edition in London together with a Latin translation under the title Nalus, carmen sanscritum e Mahābhārato, edidit, latine vertit et adnotationibus illustravit Franciscus Bopp. Since then, it has been translated into German and rewritten several times: The first metrical translation into German by Johann Gottfried Ludwig Kosegarten appeared as early as 1820. Further German translations were made by Friedrich Rückert (1828), Ernst Heinrich Meier (1847), Hermann Camillo Kellner (1886) and others.

Nala and Damayanti has been translated into at least ten European languages (German, English, French, Italian, Swedish, Czech, Polish, Russian, Modern Greek and Hungarian). The Italian poet and Orientalist Angelo De Gubernatis created a stage adaptation of the material (Il re Nala, 1869).

To this day, Nala and Damayanti is traditionally the preferred beginning reading for students of Sanskrit at Western universities because of its beauty and the simplicity of the language.

=== Stochastic elements ===
In the second half of the 20th century, historians of mathematics began to look at references to stochastic ideas in ancient India, especially the game of dice, which appears in many stories. The story of Nala and Damayanti is special because it mentions two other stochastic themes in addition to dice games: firstly, the art of rapid counting, a kind of inference from a sample to the whole and a connection between dice games and this inference that is unknown to us today. It tells of two dice games that Nala plays against his brother Pushkara. In the first, he loses his kingdom and has to flee; in the second, he wins it back. In the first dice game, Nala is portrayed as being obsessed with gambling. According to the story, the reason he wins back his lost kingdom in the second dice game is that he was able to successfully apply the knowledge he learned from King Rituparna.

== Bibliography ==
- Wadley, Susan S., ed. (2011). Damayanti and Nala. The Many Lives of a Story. New Delhi / Bangalore: Chronicle Books.

== Editions (selection) ==
=== English translation ===
Nala and Damayanti, and other Poems. Translated from the Sanscrit into English Verse, with Mythological and Critical Notes by Henry Hart Milman. Talboys, Oxford 1835 (digitized by Google Books)

=== Sanskrit with English translation ===
Monier Monier-Williams: Nalopakhyanam. Story of Nala, an Episode of the Maha-Bharata: the Sanskrit Text, - with a Copious Vocabulary, Grammatical Analysis, and Introduction. University Press, Oxford 1860 (digitized version in the Internet Archive)

=== Sanskrit with English dictionary ===
Charles Rockwell Lanman: A Sanskrit Reader: with vocabulary and notes. Boston 1888 (digitized version in the Internet Archive; reprint: Harvard University Press, Cambridge, Massachusetts 1963)
