= Matrigitikanjalih =

In modern Sanskrit literature, "Mātrigītikāñjalih" is a kavya written by Harekrishna Meher, comprising 25 Sanskrit songs on different topics and tastes experienced in human life. The titles of the songs indicate their themes. The compositions in the kavya feature alliteration, Upama, Rupaka and other figures of speech.

== See also ==
- Philosophical Reflections in the Naisadhacarita
