= Norman Mosley Penzer =

- Born: 30 September 1892
- Died: 27 November 1960 (aged 68)
- Language: English language

Norman Mosley Penzer (30 September 1892 – 27 November 1960) — known as N. M. Penzer — was a British independent scholar and Fellow of the Royal Geographical Society who specialised in Oriental studies. He translated the tale of Nala and Damayanti in 1926 from Sanskrit.

== Biography ==
Penzer’s father, the Reverend Seymour Penzer (1857–1918), was ordained in the Established Church (Church of England) and finished his career in charge of the Chapel Royal, Brighton, Sussex. Educated at the University of Cambridge, Penzer's interests encompassed economics, geology, comparative anthropology, folklore, the history of exploration, and old silver.

In Penzer’s obituary, the Royal Geographical Society lamented that his "gifts of scholarship were never as fully developed as many thought they might have been". An eminent authority on Sir Richard Francis Burton, the Society remarked that “it will always be a matter of regret that he did not write the definitive biography of Burton it was so well within his power to do."

== Works ==
=== Books ===
As editor:

- An Annotated Bibliography of Sir Richard Francis Burton, K.C.M.G. (1923); London: A. M. Philpot. (Reprinted 1970)
- Burton, R. F. (1924), Selected Papers on Anthropology, Travel & Exploration, Now edited with an Introduction and Occasional Notes by N. M. Penzer; B. Blom, 240 pages. (Reprint: Ayer Co Pub, 1972)
- The Ocean of Story, Being C. H. Tawney's Translation of Somadeva's Katha Sarit Sagara (or Ocean of Streams of Story) (1924–28), London: Chas. J. Sawyer: Volumes I, II, III, IV, V, VI, VII, VIII, IX, X at the Internet Archive (Annotated reprint of a group of ancient Indian folktales, first translated in the 1880s)
- Nala & Damayanti, A. M. Philpot, 1926; Illustrated with ten miniatures by P. Zenker
- Hamilton, Alexander and Sir William Foster (1930), A New Account of the East Indies ... Edited with Introduction and Notes by Sir William Foster, (General Editor: N. M. Penzer.) [With Maps], London.
- Basile, Giambattista, Benedetto Croce, Norman Mosley Penzer, and Stith Thompson (1932), The Pentamerone of Giambattista Basile; 2 volumes, John Lane.
- Topukapu Kyūden No Hikari To Kage, 29 pages.
- Anthropological Notes on the Sotadic Zone of Sexual Inversion Throughout the World Including Some Observations on Social and Sexual Relations of the Mohammedan Empire, by Richard F. Burton, with Photographs of Anthropological Rarities... and Rare Burton Collectanea (n.d., 1930s?), The Falstaff Press, 95 pgs (edited anonymously by Penzer and privately printed)

Original works:

- Mining and Industrial Articles (1919)
- Cotton in British West Africa, Including Togoland and the Cameroons (1920), Federation of British Industries
- The Tin Resources of the British Empire (1921), W. Rider, 358 pages
- The Mineral Resources of Burma (1922), G. Routledge & Sons, Limited
- The Library of Impostors (1926), Robert Holden & Company
- The Harēm: An Account of the Institution as it Existed in the Palace of the Turkish Sultans with a History of the Grand Seraglio from its Foundation to the Present Time (London: Harrap, 1936)
- The Book of the Wine-Label (1947), Home & Van Thal, 143 pages.
- Poison-Damsels and other Essays in Folklore and Anthropology (1952) (aka Poison Damsels : Thieves, Sacred Prostitution and the Romance of Betel Chewing); Privately printed for C. J. Sawyer; 319 pp. (An analysis of folklore regarding "poison-damsels" of India, "The Tale of Two Thieves", sacred prostitution in India and betel-chewing in India, Somadeva Bhaṭṭa (11th century author), Malaysia and Indonesia.)
- Paul Storr: The Last of the Goldsmiths, with a foreword by Charles Oman, London: Batsford, 1954
  - Paul Storr 1771-1844: Silversmith and Goldsmith, London, 1971, reissue of the 1954 book by Spring Books/Littlehampton Book Services, New York ISBN 978-0600-37960-7; 292 pages.
- An Index of English Silver Steeple Cups,(195?); Society of Silver Collectors, 23 pages
- Catalogue of the Extensive Library of Books on Silver and the Goldsmiths' Art and General Subjects (1961), Christie, Manson & Woods; 37 pages.

Articles

- Three articles on the Warwick Vase in: Apollo 62 (1955:183ff) and 63 (1956:18ff, 71ff).
