= The Story of Nal and Damayanti in Bhakti and Sufism Accounts =

The story of Nal and Damayanti is a commonly used narrative from the epic text Mahabharata. It has been interpreted in many languages which also includes Persian and Braj. This page describes the interpretations of the story conducted by Todar Mal, the Hindu finance minister of Mughal emperor Akbar and Abu al-Faiz, Akbar's poet laureate.

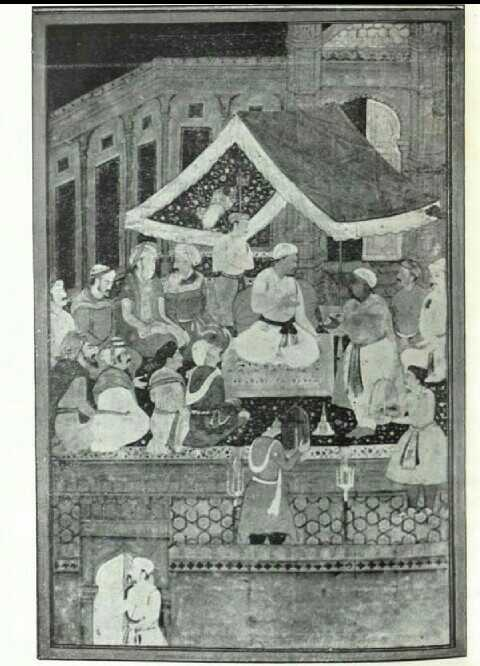
Faizi represent his work 'Nal wa daman' to Akbar.

Both the interpretations include the central theme of love. In Todar Mal's version, the story of Nal (or Nala) and Damayanti has themes such as love, deceit and war between Hindu deities and Nal. On the other hand, Faizi talks about three oppositions which also play a role as themes. The first opposition is love and intellect (aql), the second opposition is between love and beauty (husn) and the third opposition is between Ishq and junnun (frenzy). However, one account is related to Bhakti which includes a lot of Hindu deities and connections between the supreme power and human beings. The other account is related to Sufism which includes a passionate connection between love and humans.

A general statement related to Bhakti states that it is a devotional worship for one supreme deity, by whose blessings a person can achieve salvation. A Bhakti rendition of Nala-Damayanti: Todarmal's ‘Nector of Nal’s life’ describes the famous story of Nal and Damayanti. The story is described from a Hindu traditional perspective keeping in mind the Hindu culture. The story includes themes of love, deceit and war. 'Nector of Nal's Life' is closely related to Bhakti of a Hindu deity called Hari. It starts off with Damayanti's life. Damayanti is a young princess whose beauty is beyond perfection. Due to this her mother insists on marrying her daughter to a God instead of marrying her to a mere human. They consider Lord Indra to be the perfect match for Damayanti. However, the goose that had been sent to Indra holding the invitation to the marriage was hit by a storm and lands in the kingdom of a handsome king named Nal. Nal takes cares of the goose and instead of continuing its journey the goose decides to choose Nal as the rightful husband of Damayanti. Lord Indra finds out that Nal is in love with Damayanti and demands him not to marry her or else he will have to pay for his actions. However, Indra realises that he must resort to deceit in order to win Damayanti, and so he decides to take the form of Nal. Damayanti is presented with two Nals and so she must choose the one she loves. "Anguished, she calls upon Hari who guides her actions and enables her to know which is truly Nal. Only when she looks into the eyes of both does she know her true love and garlands the real Nal" (Wadley 1999, 33). This is the first instance in the story in which the power of Bhakti is displayed.

Another instance during which the notion of Bhakti is exhibited is when Hari is worried about Indra conspiring with Rahu and Ketu, Suraj and Sani. According to Hari, if their side won, they would cause Nal a lot of suffering. However, Hari says that if Nal was to remember Hari this whole time he would not be devastated. "But if this should happen and Nal continues to remember Hari throughout his twelve years of sorrow, he will return with more than he lost." (Wadley 1999, 34). This notion of belief in God shows the true meaning of Bhakti in the Hindu culture.

In addition, Nal and Damayanti were destined to struggle. Indra attacks Narwar the kingdom of Nal. All four planets jointly attack the king and destroy his wealth, grain and palaces. Looking at this Damayanti calls upon Hari once again to protect them. "But as the crisis worsens, Dumaiti calls out to Hari, asking for his help. Hari sends Narad to take Nal out of the city before all the beings in it die from Indra's onslaught" (Wadley 1999, 34). With the help of Hari, Nal and Damayanti reach the house of an oil presser because Sani cannot harm those who press sesame oil. Here, once again Nal's powers are active and he assists the oil presser by pressing much oil, making him wealthy.

Sufism is the actualisation of the Truth by means of love and devotion. Love, Passion and Reason in Faizi's Nal-Daman," in Love in South Asia:ACultural History also talks about the story of Nal and Damayanti however; a lot of Sufism elements take account in this version. Abu al-Fayz Faizi’s interpretation starts off with the story of Nal. Nal is portrayed as a man who is possessed by love. He has an illness of love because of which he is not the same. Nal blames love for his state but after meeting Daman (Damayanti) he does not think that love is evil. This is when the first opposition is introduced; love and intellect (Aql). In Sufism context, “when love becomes excess, it can only lead to disaster, for this is the inevitable consequence of the neglect of the intellect (aql) and of notions of equilibrium that are crucial both for kingship and social order" (Alam and Subrahmanyam 2006, 116). After hearing many stories about love, he was possessed by it. Nal is told a story of an Indian princess (Daman) about whom there were many rumours around the kingdom. Upon hearing the story, he concludes that Daman is the reason for this sickness even though he had no direct or indirect contact with her. Also, a section in the story says that Nal is confused as to how the bandits broke into his treasure in spite of all the guards that have been patrolling it. This point is directly connected to intellect as Nal is taken over by love and cannot think straight.

Another opposition that has been introduced in the story is between love and beauty (husn). In Sufism context love is vulnerable and ever-seeking whereas beauty is distant, refuses to be engaged and altogether is remarkable for its indifference. "Beauty fires arrows and love is wounded" (Alam and Subrahmanyam 2006, 118). Upon hearing of the beauty of Daman, Nal is mesmerised and falls further into the sickness of love. Lastly, the third opposition that has been introduced is between love and frenzy (junnun). After marrying Daman, Nal is completely lost to pleasure. He is shown to be possessed by frenzy of passion. His life is shown to have formed an alliance between love (ishq) and frenzy (junnun) against intellect (aql). He is so deeply in love that he loses his sense of equilibrium which is an important component of a great ruler. Nal's younger brother tries to take advantage of this situation by proposing a game of chess. Whoever won this game would win all the goods, treasure and the kingdom. "Nal, who is already a prisoner of junnun, falls into this whirlpool as its unsuspecting victim" (Alam and Subrahmanyam 2006, 130).

Furthermore, another practice that portrays the element of junnun is the practice of Sati. In Hinduism sati was the practice of wife burning herself in the pyre of the husband. The wife would sacrifice their life along with their husbands. "The Sufi (follower of Sufism) brimming with love and fascination for his beloved, is thought to suffer immense pain, agitation, and distress over separation" (Rehman 2014, 3). The women would show their junnun for their husbands by setting themselves on fire because they cannot bear the separation.

The two accounts Bhakti and Sufism are also very similar within these two stories. Nal is portrayed as an aashiq in Faizi's version and in Todarmal's interpretation Nal constantly falls in love with Damayanti once he hears how beautiful she is. In addition, when Nal goes to Daman's Swayamwara his competitor is a Pagan God compared to Indra in Todarmal's version. Another relevant point is the monotheism displayed. There are many Pagan Gods however; Nal only worships one ultimate God which is a little in parallel with the concept of Akbar praying to Allah. Nal is also shown to have amazing skills as a ruler. He makes a great king with a high intellect which again hints towards Akbar because he is known to be one of the greatest rulers in South Asian history.

In conclusion, the re-interpretation of the story of Nal and Damayanti suggests a lot about the interaction between Bhakti and Sufism in early modern India. Akbar the great mystic king was interested in spreading the rich Indian works all around the Persian tradition. Due to this he chose this story and it exhibits the great interest he had in Hinduism particularly the account of Bhakti. Taking the love story of Nal and Damayanti and adding a metrical scheme of the story of Layla-Majnun is what Abu al-Fayz Faizi tried achieving. The love of Nal for Damayanti is portrayed in a Sufi way by Faizi who used the components like junnun, ishq and aql to exhibit his state in love. In addition, the re-interpretation of story also exhibits the great interest Muslim rulers had in some of the Hindu/Bhakti traditions. This includes the traditions of swayamwara and Sati. Both the interpretations have the component of swayamwara present. In the Bhakti account, Nal is competing with Indra and many other kings to win Damayanti. On the other hand, the Sufism account shows Nal competing with a Pagan God and other kings to win Daman. Also, the notion of Sati is an olden Hindu tradition. In this tradition, the married women whose husband passes away, sits in the pyre of her husband. This tradition explains that once a husband dies, the wife has lost all the hopes of living and so she must take her life as well. Faizi is shown to be interested in the tradition of Sati because he uses this notion in his Sufism account of Nal and Damanyanti's story. After Nal dies, Daman sits in his pyre and dies with him. With the help of such re-interpretations many Bhakti traditions passed over to Muslim and Persian cultures and many Sufi traditions passed over to Hindu culture. Therefore, this suggests that the interaction between the two devotional traditions is very strong.
