= Naishadha Charita =

One of six epic Sanskrit poems

Naishadha Charita, also known as Naishadhiya Charita (Naiṣadhīya-carita), is a poem in Sanskrit on the life of Nala, the king of Nishadha. Written by Sriharsha, it is considered one of the five mahakavyas (great epic poems) in the canon of Sanskrit literature. It was composed by Śrī Harṣa in the court of the Gahaḍavāla King Jayachandra.

== Contents ==
Naishadha Charita presents the story of Nala's early life; his falling in love with Damayanti, their marriage, and honeymoon.

This mahakavya is divided into two parts – Purva and Uttara, each of them containing eleven cantos or divisions. Its story is that of Nala and Damayanti, the daughter of Bhima, the king of Vidarbha. This story is first related in the 3rd part of the Vanaparva of the Mahabharata, where the treatment is different. The language of the Naishadha Charita is highly elaborate and polished, with continual play upon words and variety of metres. The Shishupala Vadha of Magha and the Naishadha Charita of Sriharsha are considered tests for scholars; of the Naishadha it is said that it is Naishadham Vidvad-aushadham, i.e. the "Scholars' tonic".

== Characters ==
The main characters of the poem are:

- Nala – king of Naishadha
- Damayanti – Nala's beloved, and later his wife
- Saraswati – goddess of learning
- Indra – king of heaven
- The Gods as suitors to Damayanti

== Plot ==
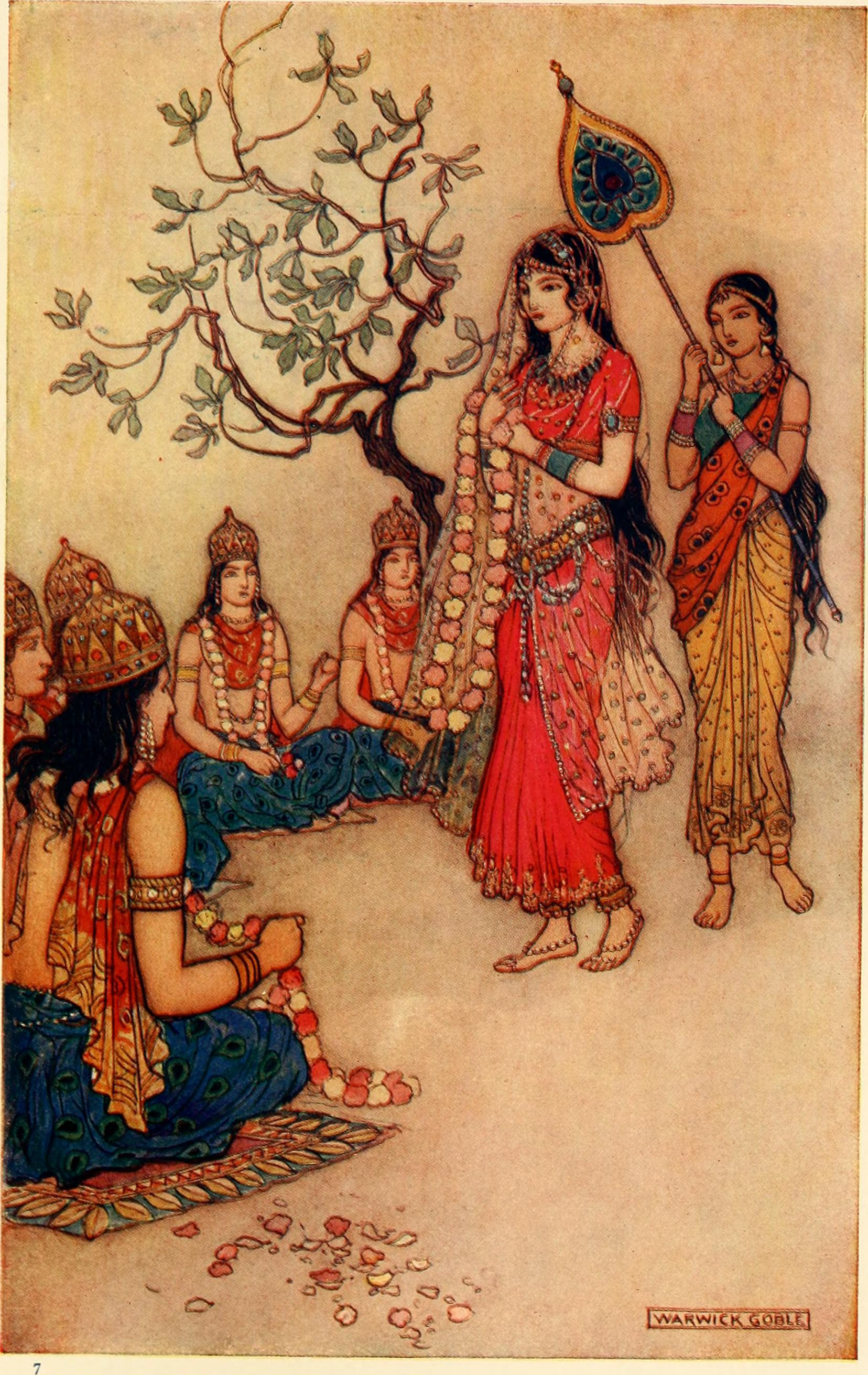
Damayanti before the five Nalas with a bridesmaid at her side.

The first canto begins with an elaborate description of Nala, his physical beauty, valour and other qualities. The minstrels visiting the court of Nala bring the news of Damayanti, the daughter of King Bhimna, as an accomplished and charming lady. Love for that princess was thus kindled in Nala. Unable to bear it, he went to a pleasure garden in his palace where he seized a beautiful swan he saw. It cried in horror and was let off by the kind prince. It went to Kundinapura, the capital city of King Bhima, and managed to find Damayanti in a garden there. The swan gave her a good picture of Nala and assured her of its services in fostering mutual affection between her and Nala. It flew to Nala and apprised him of Damayanti's enviable attainments. King Bhima was informed of his daughter's ailment, which was virtually love-sickness, by the innocent and inexperienced companions of Damayanti. Thereupon, Bhima made arrangements for the swayamvara (an ancient Indian practice whereby a girl chooses a husband from a list of suitors) of his daughter.

Meanwhile, Indra, the king of the gods, learnt from Narada the news of Damayanti's swayamvara and of her steadfast love for Nala. Natural fascination to win the hand of a damsel goaded Indra to attend the swayamvara. He got down to earth with the gods Agni, Yama, Varuna and Shani (Saturn) and met on his way Nala, who too was proceeding to attend the swayamvara. He was unable to contain his envy on noticing Nala's enchanting appearance and so resorted to a ruse by requesting Nala to be the emissary of the gods and impress upon Damayanti their unequalled worthiness. The rewards that are vouchsafed traditionally to one who offers his service to another in need were brought by Indra to the notice of Nala, who was otherwise unwilling and at the same time felt the delicacy of refusing the request of the divine beings. At last, he agreed and was sent to the harem of Damayanti, remaining invisible to others — a boon granted to him by the gods.

Keeping his identity unknown to Damayanti, Nala attempted to deliver to her the message of the gods but his well-reasoned arguments on behalf of the gods were not acceptable to Damayanti, who was against a human being seeking an alliance with the gods. Nala's warning that the gods would create problems and obstacles in her married life, if she chose someone else, did not defer her from her steadfast love for Nala. At last, Nala revealed his identity and left the harem.

The four gods assumed a form identical to Nala's and were there along with Nala, virtually presenting five Nalas. At the instance of Vishnu, Saraswati, the goddess of learning, became the bridesmaid for Damayanti. She took the princess to the kings and spoke highly of the worth of each one, but they were all rejected by Damayanti. At last, the princess was brought before the five Nalas. Sarasvati described each god in such a manner that her words attributable to that god were also contained in her description. Damayanti was perplexed. She felt that Nala was a master of many lores and could understand even the intentions of horses and so he was there presenting himself in five forms. She was unable to know the real Nala and in a mood of anguish prayed to the gods to reveal their identity and enable her to choose Nala. She found that the gods did not touch the ground with their feet, did not wink and had no sweat on their bodies. Their garlands did not fade. Thus she became certain about their identity.

On knowing Nala's identity, bashfulness took full control of her. She would put the garland around Nala's neck but her fingers did not move even a little to do so, restraint and bashfulness forbidding her. She whispered into the ears of Saraswati uttering the letter na (lit. no) and stopped. She touched the fingers of Saraswati who laughed at this. The bridesmaid took the princess before Nala and addressed the gods that Damayanti, a chaste woman, would not choose any of them and requested them to shower their favour on the princess. The gods gave their assent through the movement of their eyebrows and returned to their regions. The marriage celebrations followed on a grand scale.

Kali, the evil genius, met the gods who were returning to their regions, and was informed of Damayanti's choice. He avowed to spoil the happy life of the wedded pair and took his position on a tree in Nala's mansion.

The last five cantos deal with the happy life of Nala and Damayanti. The poet takes care to show that Nala did not violate the rules of conduct in his religious acts. The poem abruptly ends after narrating Damayanti's beauty in the moonlit night.

Events occurring in each chapter

The progress of the story spanning across 22 chapters is presented below, by showing the significant events covered in a range of verses. The verse numbers referred to here are taken from the book Naishadhiya Charitam Of Harsha published by Nirnaya Sagar Press.

=== Sarga 1 ===
Story-line in Sarga 1
Verses	Events presented
1-25	King Nala's description
26-30	Women falling in love with King Nala
31-41	Damayanti's love with King Nala
42-55	Nala's love for Damayanti
56-64	King Nala's desire to visit a garden, description of Nala's horse
68-73	The sighting of King Nala by people of the city
74-106	King Nala's wandering in the garden, description of fruits and flowers
107-116	Description of a lake in the garden
117-129	Description of a swan in the garden, Nala's capture of the swan and the reaction of other birds
130-134	The swan's rebuke of Nala
135-142	The swan's narration of its plight
143-144	Nala's release of the swan
145	Concluding verse of sarga 1

=== Sarga 2 ===
Story-line in Sarga 2
Verses	Events presented
1-7	The swan's activity after being released by Nala
8-15	The swan speaks to Nala
16-48	The swan describes Damayanti to Nala
49-62	Nala responds to the swan's words
63	Nala enters a dwelling in the garden
64-72	The swan sets off on a journey towards the Kuṇḍina
73-106	Description of Kuṇḍina
107-109	The swan spots Damayantī
110	Concluding verse of sarga 2

=== Sarga 3 ===
Story-line in Sarga 3
Verses	Events presented
1-12	The swan approaches Damayantī and leads her away to a nearby forest
13-53	The swan ridicules Damayantī in her futile attempts at capturing it. Later, the swan introduces itself to Damayantī, praises Nala and claims that Lord Brahma wishes to unite Nala and Damayantī in marriage
54-59	Damayantī seeks the swan's forgiveness. She reluctantly expresses her love for Nala
60-73	The swan encourages Damayantī to speak her mind
74-91	Damayantī expresses her love for Nala and entreats the swan to unite her with Nala
92-96	Damayantī pleads the swan to convey her message to Nala at an appropriate time
97-99	The poet (Śrī Harṣa) opines that Damayantī's expression of love for Nala is quite appropriate
100-128	The swan describes love-stricken Nala's plight to Damayantī
129	Damayantī's friends find her in the forest
130-135	The swan returns to Nala and narrates its conversation with Damayantī to him
136	Concluding verse of sarga 3

=== Sarga 4 ===
Story-line in Sarga 4
Verses	Events presented
1-42	Description of the plight of love-stricken Damayantī
43-74	Afflicted by her love for Nala, Damayantī speaks to her friend and censures the moon
75-99	Damayantī censures Manmatha
100-109	Damayantī and her friends engage in a conversation in the form of riddles
110-114	Damayantī faints and her friends revive her
115-122	King Bhīma rushes to his daughter's chamber upon hearing the commotion and learns that she is love-stricken from the physician
124	Concluding verse of sarga 4

=== Sarga 5 ===
Story-line in Sarga 5
Verses	Events presented
1-11	Sage Nārada visits heaven along with his friend sage Parvata
12-19	Indra inquires Nārada why Kings perishing in battle were not attaining heaven. Indra further bemoans that the wealth of the heaven is worthless if it were not be offered to others
20-36	Nārada praises Indra for his magnanimity. He describes the beauty of Damayantī to Indra and her love for a human (without revealing Nala's name). He further adds that the kings of the earth are attending Damayantī's svayaṃvara and hence are not engaged in battle at the moment.
37-39	Indra says that Lord Viṣṇu's power has ensured that the Gods remain unrivalled
40-44	Disappointed due to not witnessing a battle in heaven, Nārada leaves heaven
45-54	Indra's wife Śacī and other apsaras are saddened by his love for Damayantī.
55-58	Gods Agni, Indra, Yama and Varuṇa are also eager to marry Damayantī and follow Indra to the earth to attend Damayantī's svayaṃvara
59-73	The Gods meet with Nala, who is on his way to the svayaṃvara, and are captivated by his charming personality
74-78	The Gods greet Nala. Indra introduces himself, the other Gods and presents a request before Nala
79-92	Nala ponders over Indra's words. He mulls over the qualities of a charitable man and the greatness of charity
93-97	Nala salutes to the Gods and agrees to fulfil their request
98-102	The Gods express that they are in love with Damayantī. They wish Nala to act as their messenger and inform Damayantī of their love for her
103-115	Nala explains his incapability in acting as their messenger
116-137	Indra warns Nala of not fulfilling his promise given to the Gods. The Gods convince Nala that attainment of fame is greater than attaining Damayanti and finally persuade him to act as their messenger
138	Concluding verse of sarga 5

=== Sarga 6 ===
Story-line in Sarga 6
Verses	Events presented
1-6	Nala sets on his journey towards the city of Kuṇḍina
7-49	Nala enters the city of Kuṇḍina. He becomes invisible owing to the boon of the Gods. Women of the city see Nala's shadow, footprints, ornaments etc. and are astonished by an invisible thing in their city
50-56	The invisible Nala runs into Damayantī and she hurls a garland onto his neck
57-74	Nala enters the Damayantī's chamber and observes the various activities of her friends
75	Nala is dejected at the prospect of acting as the Gods' messenger
76-89	Another messenger of Indra enters the chamber and offers Indra's proposition to Damayantī.
90-110	Damayantī rejects Indra's proposal and censures her friends for questioning her love for Nala
111-112	Nala is joyous on seeing Damayantī's rejection of Indra's proposal
113	Concluding verse of sarga 6

=== Sarga 7 ===
Story-line in Sarga 7
Verses	Events presented
1-3	Nala's emotions upon seeing Damayantī
4-8	Nala closely examines every limb of Damayantī
9-19	Nala describes Damayantī's beauty to himself
20-22	Nala describes Damayantī's tresses
23	Nala describes Damayantī's forehead
24-26	Nala describes Damayantī's eyebrows
27-35	Nala describes Damayantī's eyes
36	Nala describes Damayantī's nose
37-42	Nala describes Damayantī's lower lip
43	Nala describes Damayantī's smile
44-46	Nala describes Damayantī's teeth
47-50	Nala describes Damayantī's speech
51	Nala describes Damayantī's chin
52-60	Nala describes Damayantī's face along with its parts
61-65	Nala describes Damayantī's ears
66	Nala describes Damayantī's neck
67	Nala describes Damayantī's throat
68-69	Nala describes Damayantī's arms
70-72	Nala describes Damayantī's hands
73-80	Nala describes Damayantī's bosom
81	Nala describes the folds on Damayantī's stomach
82	Nala describes Damayantī's waist
83	Nala describes the hairline around Damayantī's waist
84	Nala desires to view all of Damayantī's limbs
85	Nala describes Damayantī's belly button
86	Manmatha excels only with the assistance of Damayantī's limbs
87	Nala describes Damayantī's back
88	Nala describes Damayantī's buttocks
89	The potter of youth is assisted by Damayantī's bosom, hairline and buttocks
90	Nala describes Damayantī's unspeakable organ
91	Viewing Damayantī is equivalent to viewing the apsaras
92-94	Nala describes Damayantī's thighs
95	Damayantī causes infatuation even to saints
96	Nala describes Damayantī's shanks
97	Nala describes Damayantī's ankles
98-101	Nala describes Damayantī's feet
102	Damayantī's ears and other limbs are peerless
103	Lord Brahma seeks Damayantī's face, feet and hands in order to create lotuses
104	Nala describes Damayantī's toes
105	Nala describes Damayantī's toe-nails
106	Four moons reside in Damayantī
107	Speech is rendered useless in describing Damayantī's beauty
108	Nala is eager to make himself visible to the assembly
109	Concluding verse of sarga 7

=== Sarga 8 ===
Story-line in Sarga 8
Verses	Events presented
1-2	Unable to restrain himself, Nala gives up his cloak of invisibility
3-5	Damayantī is smitten with love upon seeing Nala. Nala, too, is enamoured upon seeing her
6-7	Damayantī's friends in the assembly are astonished upon seeing a man appear out of nowhere
8-15	Damayantī is overjoyed upon seeing Nala and closely examines his every limb
16-19	Lord Brahma has indeed upheld Damayantī's chastity by sending Nala as a messenger. Damayantī begins to converse with him
20-30	Damayantī establishes the approach to honouring guests and questions Nala about his name, lineage and the place from which he arrived
31-49	Damayantī imagines Nala to be a God, claims that a person with excellent qualities must be praised and continues to heap praises upon Nala
50-57	Even as Nala is tormented by love as Damayantī questions him, he restrains himself from revealing his identity. He accepts a chair offered and inquires about her well-being
58-60	Nala states that the four Gods - Indra, Agni, Yama and Varuṇa are in love with her
61-70	Nala describes Indra's plight since he has been blinded by love for Damayantī
71-76	Nala describes Agni's plight since he has been blinded by love for Damayantī
77-79	Nala describes Yama's plight since he has been blinded by love for Damayantī
80-83	Nala describes Varuṇa's plight since he has been blinded by love for Damayantī
84-88	Manmatha has torment these four Gods and they have now arrived at the city of Kuṇḍina to win over Damayantī
89-108	Nala relays the messages of each of the Gods to Damayantī
109	Concluding verse of sarga 8

=== Sarga 9 ===
Story-line in Sarga 9
Verses	Events presented
1-6	Damayantī ignores the question about the proposition of the Gods and continues to question Nala about his lineage and name
7-11	Nala refuses to state his name and lineage and pleads with Damayantī to respond to the proposal of the Gods
12-17	Nala reveals his lineage but not his name. Damayantī remains adamant about not responding to the Gods' proposition
18-21	Nala continues to plead with Damayantī to respond to the Gods' proposal thus making his task as a messenger successful
22-37	Damayantī thinks that the Gods proposal is inappropriate, censures them and rejects their proposal despite Nala's pleading. Damayantī vows to give up her life if she is unable to marry Nala and requests him to convey her opinion to the Gods
38-51	Nala assumes a sterner tone to intimidate Damayantī and warns her that she would ultimately be won over by one of the four Gods even if she took her own life.
52-53	Nala explains the merits of marrying Indra
54-55	Nala explains the merits of marrying Agni
56-57	Nala explains the merits of marrying Yama
58-59	Nala explains the merits of marrying Varuṇa
60-73	Damayantī rejects Nala's words and remains silent. She speaks to Nala through her friend and reaffirms her love for Nala. Nala is disheartened at his predicament of acting as the Gods' messenger
74-77	Nala admonishes Damayantī that her marriage with one of the four Gods is unavoidable because of their overwhelming power
78-83	Nala threatens Damayantī that if she were to marry Nala, the marriage would be thwarted by many obstacles created by the Gods
84-93	Frightened by Nala's threats, Damayantī starts weeping and immerses herself into an ocean of sorrow. She prays to Manmatha to grant her death and censures her heart for not breaking into pieces already
94-100	Damayantī continues to foster thoughts of her death and laments about how the Gods have no compassion
101-120	Nala momentarily loses the stability of his mind upon seeing Damayantī plight and accidentally reveals to her that he is indeed Nala. He proceeds to console her for his harsh words
121-127	Nala realizes his mistake of revealing his true identity to Damayantī and is ashamed that he failed to deliver on the promise made to the Gods. However, he is satisfied with his sincere efforts of being the Gods' messenger
128-135	The swan arrives and offers advice to Nala that he should immediately console Damayantī. Nala attempts to appease her
136-156	Damayantī is overjoyed upon learning the messenger's true identity and becomes bashful. She engages in a conversation with him through her friend
157-159	Nala returns to the Gods and narrates what transpired at Damayantī's assembly
160	Concluding verse of sarga 9

=== Sarga 10 ===
Story-line in Sarga 10
Verses	Events presented
1-9	Princes from all over the world head towards Kuṇḍina to attend Damayantī's svayaṃvara
10-16	Among the eight overlords of the eight quarters, only four Gods attend - Indra (overlord of the eastern quarter), Agni (overlord of the south-eastern quarter), Yama (overlord of the southern quarter) and Varuṇa (overlord of the western quarters) attend Damayantī's svayaṃvara
17-24	The Gods Indra, Agni, Yama and Varuṇa assume Nala's form and arrive at the svayaṃvara. However, they are unable to attain the Nala's splendour
25-31	The serpent Vāsuki arrives at the svayaṃvara. King Bhīma offers great honour to all the princes that arrive. Every prince is smitten with love at the prospect of gaining Damayantī's hand in marriage
31-43	Nala arrives at the svayaṃvara along with the other kings. Nala's charm fills the other kings with jealousy, and some of them praise him
44-50	Nala is bewildered upon seeing four others identical to himself and questions them about their identity. The Gods reply to his questions using puns, which Nala understands
51-58	The attendees examine the svayaṃvara's beauty
59-66	Śukrācārya praises the svayaṃvara's beauty
67-69	King Bhīma is overwhelmed with the number of attendees as he is unable to present the lineage, character of each of the kings to his daughter. He prays to the Gods to help him with accomplishing this task
70-73	Lord Viṣṇu asks Goddess Sarasvatī to assist King Bhīma with the task of narrating the lineage and qualities of the Kings gathered at the svayaṃvara
74	Sarasvatī arrives at the svayaṃvara
75-88	A description of the various limbs of Sarasvatī
89-91	Sarasvatī speaks to King Bhīma and expresses her ability to describe the lineage and character of all the assembled kings. King Bhīma salutes her
92-100	King Bhīma invites Damayantī into the assembly. The onlookers are ecstatic upon seeing Damayantī decked in ornaments
101-113	The Kings observe Damayantī's every limb intently. They experience horripilation and astonishment and are struck by Manmatha's arrows
114-132	The kings praise Damayantī's beauty
133-134	Indra sees Damayantī and praises her beauty
134-137	Nala listens to Indra's (who is in the disguise of Nala) praise of Damayantī and suspects that the person praising her is Indra. However, Indra offers an alternative explanation to his praise and dispels Nala's doubts.
138	Concluding verse of sarga 10

=== Sarga 11 ===
Story-line in Sarga 11
Verses	Events presented
1-6	As Damayantī enters the assembly, the Kings are reflecting in the gems of her ornaments.
7-14	Damayantī's palanquin is led towards the Gods and Sarasvatī encourages her to choose one of the Gods. She lures Damayantī with the prospect of owning the kalpavṛkṣa and Mount Meru. Damayantī rejects all the Gods and also the yakṣas, gandharvas and vidyādharas attending the svayaṃvara
15-22	Damayantī's palanquin is led towards the serpent Vāsuki and Sarasvatī praises Vāsuki's glory. Damayantī is frightened upon seeing Vāsuki and rejects him along with other serpents attending the svayaṃvara
23-33	Damayantī's palanquin is led towards Kings of islands. Sarasvatī points toward Savana, king of the Puṣkara island, and describes the merits in marrying him. Damayantī rejects Savana
34-46	Damayantī's palanquin is led towards another King Havya, the king of the Śāka island. Sarasvatī extols the virtues of Havya and describes the merits in marrying him. Damayantī rejects Havya
47-65	Damayantī's palanquin is led towards another King Jyotiṣmān, the king of the Krauñca island. Sarasvatī extols the virtues of Jyotiṣmān and describes the merits in marrying him. Damayantī rejects Jyotiṣmān
66-70	Damayantī's palanquin is led towards another King Vapuṣmān, the king of the Śālmala island. Sarasvatī extols the virtues of Vapuṣmān and describes the merits in marrying him. Damayantī rejects Vapuṣmān
71-81	Damayantī's palanquin is led towards another King Medhātithi, the king of the Plakṣa island. Sarasvatī extols the virtues of Medhātithi and describes the merits in marrying him. Damayantī rejects Medhātithi
82-93	Damayantī's palanquin is led towards the king of the Jambū island. Sarasvatī extols the virtues of the King of the Jambū island and describes the merits in marrying him. Damayantī rejects him
94-101	Damayantī's palanquin is led towards the king of Gauḍa. Sarasvatī extols the virtues of the King of Gauḍa and describes the merits in marrying him. Damayantī rejects him
102-112	Damayantī's palanquin is led towards the king of Mathurā. Sarasvatī extols the virtues of the King of Mathurā and describes the merits in marrying him. Damayantī rejects him
113-129	Damayantī's palanquin is led towards the king of Kāśī. Sarasvatī extols the virtues of the King of Kāśī and describes the merits in marrying him. Damayantī rejects him
130	Concluding verse of sarga 11

=== Sarga 12 ===
Story-line in Sarga 12
Verses	Events presented
1-5	Some kings arrive late to the svayaṃvara as Damayantī's palanquin is placed in the middle of the assembly
6-13	Sarasvatī points Damayantī towards Ṛtuparṇa, the king of Ayodhyā, extols his virtues and describes the merits in marrying him. Damayantī rejects Ṛtuparṇa
14-22	Sarasvatī points Damayantī towards the king of Pāṇḍya. Sarasvatī extols the virtues of the King of Pāṇḍya and describes the merits in marrying him. Damayantī rejects him
23-31	Sarasvatī points Damayantī towards the king of Kaliṅga. Sarasvatī extols the virtues of the King of Kaliṅga and describes the merits in marrying him. Damayantī rejects him
32-41	Sarasvatī points Damayantī towards the king of Kāñcī. Sarasvatī extols the virtues of the King of Kāñcī and describes the merits in marrying him. Damayantī rejects him
42-52	Sarasvatī points Damayantī towards the king of Nepal. Sarasvatī extols the virtues of the King of Nepal and describes the merits in marrying him. Damayantī rejects him
53-61	Sarasvatī points Damayantī towards the king of Malaya (either Malaysia or Kerala); Sarasvatī extols the virtues of the King of Malaya and describes the merits in marrying him. Damayantī rejects him
62-68	Sarasvatī points Damayantī towards the king of Mithilā. Sarasvatī extols the virtues of the King of Mithilā and describes the merits in marrying him. Damayantī rejects him
69-77	Sarasvatī points Damayantī towards the king of Kāmarūpa. Sarasvatī extols the virtues of the King of Kāmarūpa and describes the merits in marrying him. Damayantī rejects him
78-86	Sarasvatī points Damayantī towards the king of Utkala. Sarasvatī extols the virtues of the King of Utkala and describes the merits in marrying him. Damayantī rejects him
87-107	Sarasvatī points Damayantī towards the king of Kīṭa. Sarasvatī extols the virtues of the King of Kīṭa and describes the merits in marrying him. Damayantī rejects him
108-112	Damayantī and Nala look at each other in the assembly and experience love
113	Concluding verse of sarga 12

=== Sarga 13 ===
Story-line in Sarga 13
Verses	Events presented
1-8	Damayantī's palanquin is led to the place where the five Nalas are seated. Using puns, Sarasvatī extols Indra, who is in the disguise of Nala. Damayantī assumes that the king being praised is indeed Nala
9-14	Using puns, Sarasvatī extols Agni, who is also in the disguise of Nala. Damayantī assumes that the king being praised is indeed Nala
15-20	Using puns, Sarasvatī extols Yama, who is also in the disguise of Nala. Damayantī assumes that the king being praised is indeed Nala
21-26	Using puns, Sarasvatī extols Varuṇa, who is also in the disguise of Nala. Damayantī assumes that the king being praised is indeed Nala
27-36	Sarasvatī now points Damayantī to the real Nala and extols him. Using puns, she also extols the four Gods - Indra, Agni, Yama and Varuṇa. Damayantī's confusion is now compounded as she thinks that all the five kings are Nala
37-55	Damayantī gets anxious as she is unable to identify the real Nala. She concludes that her prayers offered to the Gods are indeed futile
56	Concluding verse of sarga 13

=== Sarga 14 ===
Story-line in Sarga 14
Verses	Events presented
1-10	Damayantī offers prayers to the Gods and contemplates upon them. Pleased with her prayers, the Gods bless her
11-18	Damayantī is endowed with a discerning mind after the Gods conferred blessings upon her. She recognizes the real Nala among the five Nalas by pondering over the descriptions uttered by Sarasvatī. She praises Sarasvatī's skillful play of words
19-24	Damayantī now observes that the false Nalas bear signs that are unique to Gods and is grateful that the Gods' blessing has resulted in her recognizing the real Nala
25-39	Damayantī is overcome by bashfulness to place a garland on Nala's neck. Sarasvatī pretends to to not know of Damayantī's motives and playfully leads her towards the Gods. Damayantī resists Sarasvatī's attempts by holding her hand firmly and instead starts walking towards the real Nala. However, Sarasvatī leads Damayantī towards Indra
40-47	Sarasvatī goads Damayantī to prostrate to the Gods and requests them to approve Damayantī's marriage of Nala. Damayantī places the garland on Nala's neck
48-58	Nala and Damayantī experience sāttvikabhāvas like horripilation, stupefaction etc.
59-69	The Gods give up their disguise of Nala and assume their real forms. Sarasvatī also reveals her real form
70-74	Indra confers boons upon Nala and Damayantī
75-78	Agni confers boons upon Nala and Damayantī
79-80	Yama confers boons upon Nala and Damayantī
81-84	Varuṇa confers boons upon Nala and Damayantī
85-91	Sarasvatī offers the cintāmaṇi mantra to Nala and states the merits of uttering that mantra. She also affirms the great benefits that will occur to a poet that narrates the story of Nala
92-95	The Gods offer the boon of assuming any form of her choice to Damayantī and set out towards heaven
96-100	Kings in the assembly praise Nala. Damayantī arranges for her friends to marry the Kings who were rejected by her
101	Concluding verse of sarga 14

=== Sarga 15 ===
Story-line in Sarga 15
Verses	Events presented
1-2	Nala showers wealth on bards and leaves towards his residence
3-4	The attendants of Kings that were rejected by Damayantī heap blame upon Nala but their imputing of blame to Nala is just false
5-6	King Bhīma informs his wife about Damayantī's selection of a great groom in the svayaṃvara
7-8	King Bhīma commands women to make arrangements for the wedding and consults with an astrologer to determine an auspicious time for the wedding
9-10	King Bhīma sends a messenger to Nala and requests him to accept his daughter's hand in marriage
11-19	Preparation of food, decorations of builds etc. are done as arrangements for the wedding
20-57	Damayantī is given a holy bath and every part of her body is described in great detail. Wives of other kings prostrate to Damayantī and she receives blessings from elders
58-71	Attendants prepare Nala for the wedding and he receives blessings from elders
72-91	As Nala commences his journey towards the wedding, woman gather on the streets to view him and express their thoughts about Nala, Damayantī and their wedding
91	Concluding verse of sarga 15

=== Sarga 16 ===
Story-line in Sarga 16
Verses	Events presented
1-7	Nala proceeds towards King Bhīma's palace along with the priest Gautama and is met by King Bhīma's attendants on the way.
8-15	Nala is welcomed at the entrance and his army meets with King Bhīma's army. King Bhīma's son offers hospitality to guests and the wedding begins
16-35	King Bhīma offers innumerable gifts to Nala, including the cintāmaṇimālā
36-41	Damayantī receives blessings from mantras recited in the wedding. Nala shows the Arundhatī star to Damayantī
42-44	Nala and Damayantī experience sāttvikabhāvas like horripilation, stupefaction etc. when they touch each other. Gautama completes the performance of the wedding
45-47	Nala and Damayantī enter a special room where they would stay for three days by following certain rules
48-56	Men from Nala's group are joked around by beautiful women from King Bhīma's group
57-111	Delicious food is served to all guests. Some men from Nala's camp are enamoured by women who serve them food.
112-118	Nala sets out towards his kingdom along with Damayantī. Damayantī's parents are grief-stricken to see their daughter leave them and so is Damayantī to leave her parents
119-129	As Nala enters his kingdom, he is greeted by his ministers. Women of the kingdom offer a warm welcome to the new couple. Gods shower flowers on them from heaven
130	Concluding verse of sarga 16

=== Sarga 17 ===
Story-line in Sarga 17
Verses	Events presented
1-12	The Gods travel towards heaven after the svayaṃvara
13-19	The Gods come across the army of Kali and spot Manmatha as a member of his army
20-23	The Gods see personified anger and his attendants in the army
24-28	The Gods see personified greed and his attendants in the army
29-34	The Gods see personified delusion and his attendants in the army
35-36	The Gods recognize some people in the army as they see Cārvāka
37-39	Cārvāka asserts that the words of the Veda are worthless and proceeds to praise the Bauddha doctrine
40-83	Cārvāka makes many statements contradicting the Vedas. He claims that maintaining the purity of one's lineage is not worthless and that there is nothing wrong in committing sin. He also asserts that the śrauta and smārta karmas are worthless and censures those who perform such karmas.
84-85	Indra is furious about the condemnation of Vedas
86-91	Indra rebukes Cārvāka and supports the Vedas by providing several examples
92-94	Agni rebukes Cārvāka and supports the Vedas by providing several examples
95-101	Yama rebukes Cārvāka and supports the Vedas by providing several examples
102-106	Varuṇa rebukes Cārvāka and supports the Vedas by providing several examples
107-132	Cārvāka introduces himself as Kali approaches the Gods along with personified dvāpara and sins. Kali states that he is on his way to Damayantī's svayaṃvara. The Gods say that Kali was meant to remain a naiṣṭhika-brahmacārī and hence should desist from any attempts at getting married. They also inform him that Damayantī was already wedded to Nala. Kali is angered upon learning this and ridicules the Gods in their inability to attain Damayantī
133-140	Kali floats a proposal to kidnap Damayantī and is reprimanded by Sarasvatī. Kali then vows to separate Damayantī from Nala
141-151	Indra praises Damayantī and Nala as followers of vedic dharma and cautions Kali that he would never succeed in his evil scheme.
152-153	Other Gods agree with Indra about Kali's failure in his mission
154	Indra asks Kali to not travel towards Damayantī's svayaṃvara while Kali asks Indra not to travel towards heaven
155	Agni asks Kali to not travel towards Damayantī's svayaṃvara while Kali asks Agni not to travel towards heaven
156	Yama asks Kali to not travel towards Damayantī's svayaṃvara while Kali asks Yama not to travel towards heaven
158	Varuṇa asks Kali to not travel towards Damayantī's svayaṃvara while Kali asks Varuṇa not to travel towards heaven
157-163	The Gods reach heaven while Kali and Dvāpara, filled with jealousy, head towards the Niṣadha kingdom. They manage to enter the kingdom after initially encountering some obstacles
164-207	The righteous people of Niṣadha are engaged in the study of the Vedas, performance of vedic rituals etc. These activities prevent Kali from getting further into the city. Kali is often overpowered on encountering pious men and continues to find an entry into the city
208-219	Kali enters Nala's garden and rests on a bibhītaka tree and waits there for a long time, hoping for a slip-up from Nala. Meanwhile, Dvāpara continues to search for Nala
220	Manmatha invokes love between Nala and Damayantī
221	Concluding verse of sarga 17

=== Sarga 18 ===
Story-line in Sarga 18
Verses	Events presented
1-4	Nala hands over his kingdom to his ministers and tries to alleviate Damayantī's pain of being separated from her parents
5-29	Nala's palace is described
30-39	Damayantī's bashfulness in making love with Nala
40-153	An elaborate description of the love-making of Nala and Damayantī
154	Concluding verse of sarga 18

=== Sarga 19 ===
Story-line in Sarga 19
Verses	Events presented
1-66	Bards arrive at the palace and sing glories of Nala in order to wake him up from sleep. They describe Nala, Damayantī, the sun and nature while praising Nala. Damayantī offers gifts to the bards
67	Concluding verse of sarga 19

=== Sarga 20 ===
Story-line in Sarga 20
Verses	Events presented
1-10	Nala arrives in the palace after performing his morning prayers, to the surprise of bards. Damayantī pretends to be angry because Nala leaves to perform his morning prayers
11-23	Nala finishes morning prayers and appeases her
24-50	Nala converses with Damayantī's friend Kalā jocularly as she answers questions directed towards Damayantī
51-97	Kalā claims that Damayantī's bashfulness is due to her suspicion that Indra has assumed Nala's form and is present before her. Kalā challenges Nala to prove his identity and Nala proceeds to describe the details of their love-making
98-124	Overcome by bashfulness, Damayantī closes Kalā's ears to prevent her from hearing Nala's words. Kalā and her friend pretend to discuss the love-making of Nala and Damayantī despite Kalā not hearing any of Nala's words
125-140	Nala drenches the clothes of Kalā and her friend and they are forced out of the palace. Other friends of Damayantī leave the palace too
141-161	Nala begins to embrace and kiss Damayantī but she avoids him and leaves the palace. Nala worships Lord Śiva after his afternoon ablution
162	Concluding verse of sarga 20

=== Sarga 21 ===
Story-line in Sarga 21
Verses	Events presented
1-32	Nala is honoured by others Kings and teaches some of them the art of using weapons. After his bath, he enters a special room to worship Gods
33-121	Nala offers prayers to the Sun, Viṣṇu and Śiva. Nala is blessed by Lord Viṣṇu. After his worship, Nala offers wealth to brāhmaṇas
122-130	A parrot and cuckoo are brought into the yard where Nala and Damayantī sit. Gandharva women arrive to play the vīṇā as an accompaniment to singing
131-149	The parrot praises Nala and Damayantī and the Gandharva women leave the palace as evening falls. Damayantī sees a lake from the palace and becomes compassionate towards cakravāka birds as the sun sets.
150-163	Nala praises the beauty of Damayantī's limbs and exits the palace to perform his evening worship
163	Concluding verse of sarga 21

=== Sarga 22 ===
Story-line in Sarga 22
Verses	Events presented
1-39	Nala describes darkness
40-60	Nala describes the moon and encourages Damayantī to also do the same
61-102	Damayantī describes the moon
103-108	Nala praises Damayantī
109-150	Nala describes the moon once again
151	Concluding verse of sarga 22

== Date and authorship ==
Sriharsa flourished during the 12th century A.D. He lived during the reign of Jayachandra of Kanauj who was defeated by Shihabuddin in 1193 A.D.

== Translations ==
Naishadha Charita was translated into Telugu by the 15th-century Telugu poet Srinatha. It was translated into English by Krishna Kanta Handique, and into Hindi by Guman Mishra and Rishinatha Bhatta.
