= Pushkara =

Mahabharata character

Pushkara (Sanskrit: पुष्कर, romanized: Puṣkara) is a character in the ancient Indian epic, the Mahabharata, known primarily for his role in the episode of Nala and Damayanti. He is the younger brother of King Nala of Nishadha and serves as a pivotal antagonist during a key episode of Nala’s life. Scheming with the gandharva Kali, he defeates Nala in a manipulated game of dice, robbing him of his kingdom and riches. Nala later defeats him in a rematch, and is restored as the king. Despite his actions and lust for Nala's wife, Damayanti, Pushkara is forgiven, and the brothers make their peace with each other.

== Biography ==
Pushkara is born to Virasena and is the younger brother of Nala. Twelve years after the marriage of Nala and Damayanti, Nala becomes spiritually defiled, which allows the malevolent spirit Kali to enter and possess him. In this corrupted state, Pushkara shemes with Kali and challenges Nala to a game of dice. Unknown to Nala, Dvāpara, an ally of Kali, has entered the dice themselves, ensuring that Pushkara wins consistently. Nala, under Kali's influence, accepts the challenge and engages in the game, losing repeatedly to Pushkara. The citizens of Niṣadha protest these developments, but Nala, gripped by his addiction and manipulated by supernatural forces, pays no heed. As the losses accumulate, Nala’s position deteriorates drastically. Eventually, he gambles away his entire kingdom to Pushkara, retaining only Damayanti. After this, Pushkara becomes king of Niṣadha. Nala departs the city, wearing only a single garment, and is followed by Damayanti. Pushkara announces execution if anyone tries to help the couple.

Three years later, after a series of transformative experiences for Nala, including the loss of his identity and eventual restoration, he returns to Niṣadha. Now restored to his true form and free of Kali’s influence, Nala challenges Pushkara to another game of dice. Confident in his previous success and hopeful of winning Damayanti for himself, Pushkara accepts the rematch. This time, however, the outcome is reversed. Nala defeats Pushkara decisively in the game. Displaying magnanimity and a sense of justice, Nala chooses to forgive Pushkara rather than punish him, and dispatches him from the kingdom. Nala then reclaims his throne and resumes his kingship over Niṣadha.

== See also ==
- Nala and Damayanti

== Sources ==
- Dowson's Classical Dictionary of Hindu Mythology
