= Rituparna =

King in Hindu mythology

- Texts: Mahabharata
- Region: Ayodhya

Genealogy
- Parents: Ayutāyu (father)
- Dynasty: Suryavamsha

Rituparna (Sanskrit: ऋतुपर्ण, romanized: Ṛtuparṇa) is a king of Ayodhya featured in Hindu literature. Belonging to the Suryavamsha (Solar dynasty), he appears in the legend of Nala and Damayanti in the Mahabharata. He employs Nala in the stables and the kitchen, under the alias of Bahuka.

== Legend ==
The serpent-king Karkotaka advised Nala to go the court of King Rituparna of Ayodhya, employed as the king's primary charioteer under the name of Bahuka. Damayanti, Nala's wife, suspected that her husband now lived in the court of Ayodhya. She sent a Brahmana named Sudeva to act as her messenger to Rituparna, inviting him to her second svayamvara, which was to take place the following sunrise. Rituparna rode towards the kingdom of Vidarbha at once, with Nala as his charioteer. During a certain point in the journey, when his cloak fell upon the ground, he requested Nala to halt so that he may retrieve it; to his surprise, Nala had covered a distance of one yojana within that moment from the spot that his cloak had fallen. Observing a tree in the forest, Rituparna was able to offer a precise count of the number of leaves and fruits upon it. In exchange for teaching the Akṣahṛdaya mantra to Nala, which offered mastery over gambling, he learnt the Aśvahṛdaya mantra, which offered him mastery over riding. After they reached Vidarbha, after a series of tests, he realised that the second svayamvara was a scheme by Damayanti, ultimately to reconcile with her husband, Nala. Bearing no resentment, Rituparna was glad about the reunion of the couple, and returned to his kingdom.
