= Damayanti =

Heroine in ancient Indian literature

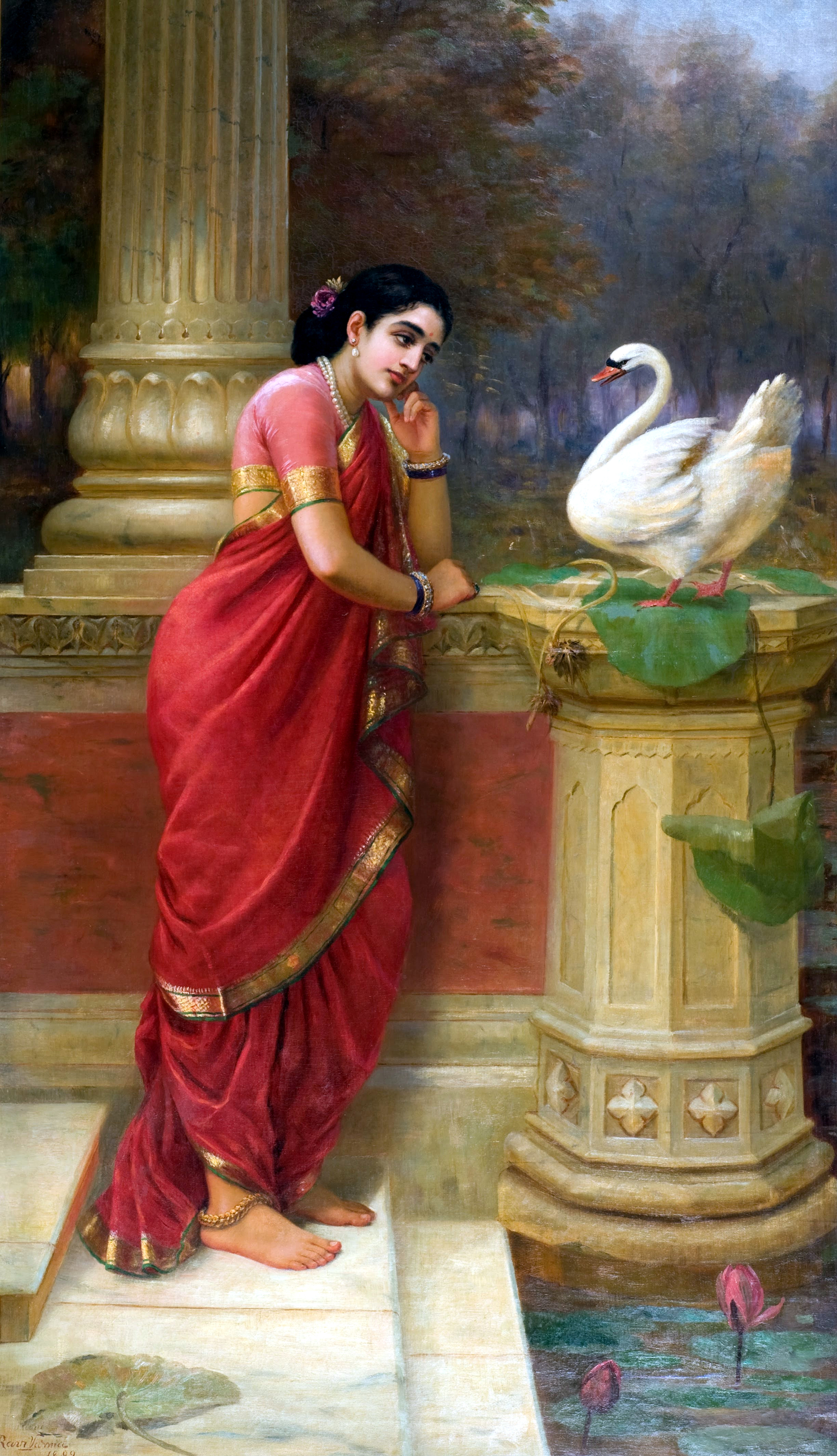
- Hamsa Damayanti by Raja Ravi Varma depicting Damayanti conversing with the divine swan about Nala.

Information
- Title: Queen of Nishada
- Family: Bhima, King of Vidarbha (father); Queen of Vidarbha (mother); Dama, Danta, and Damana (brothers)
- Spouse: Nala
- Children: Indrasena (son); Indrasenā (daughter)
- Relatives: Queen-mother of Chedi (maternal aunt); Subahu and Sunanda (maternal cousins); Pushkara (brother-in-law)
- Origin: Vidarbha kingdom

Damayanti (Sanskrit: दमयन्ती, romanized: Damayantī) is a heroine in ancient Indian literature, primarily known for her role in the episode of Nalopakhyana, which is embedded within the Vana Parva (the third book) of the epic Mahabharata (c. 400 BCE – 400 CE). She is celebrated for her beauty, intelligence, unwavering love, and steadfast devotion to her husband, Nala, the king of Nishadha kingdom.

Damayanti is the princess of ancient Vidarbha Kingdom and the daughter of King Bhima. (Note: not to be confused with the Pandava Bhima, a central character of the Mahabharata.) She falls in love with Nala after hearing about his virtues from a divine swan. She chooses him in a swayamvara (self-choice ceremony), even rejecting gods who had disguised themselves as Nala. Their happiness is short-lived when Nala, influenced by the malicious deity Kali, loses his kingdom in a game of dice and is forced into exile. Overcome with despair and shame, he abandons Damayanti in the forest. Undeterred, she endures great hardships and eventually reaches her father’s court. Determined to find Nala, she devises a plan to draw him out by organizing a second swayamvara. The plan succeeds, and they are joyfully reunited. Nala then regains his kingdom, and the two are restored as the rightful king and queen of Nishadha.

Damayanti has been adapted in various Hindu texts by numerous authors across multiple Indian languages. Along with Nala, she is the central figure in Naishadhiya Charita, a 12th-century Sanskrit epic written by Sriharsha. This work is one of the five mahakavyas (great epic poems) in the canon of Sanskrit literature.

== Legend ==
=== Birth and early life ===
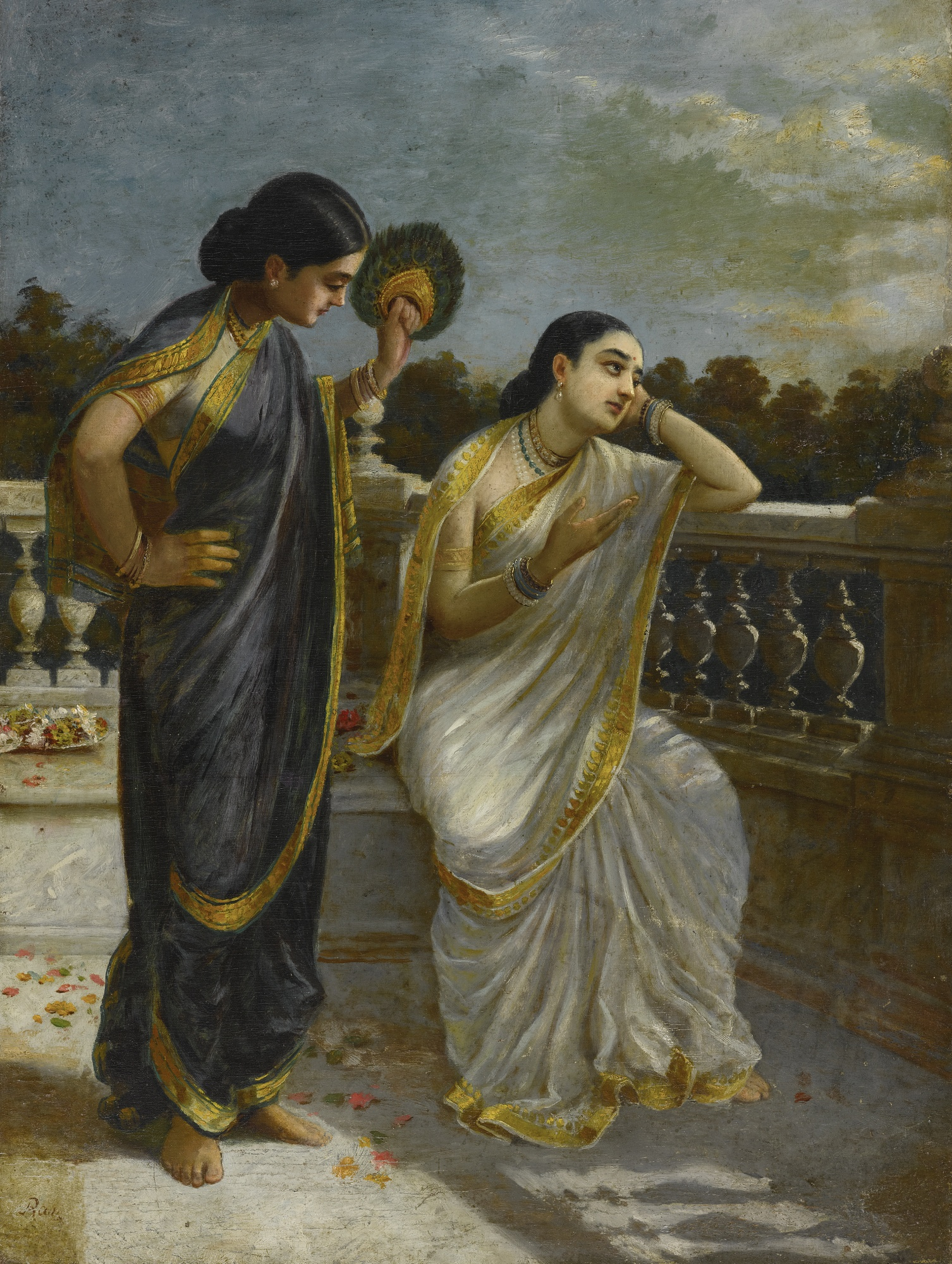
Damayanti confiding her love for Nala to her handmaiden Keshini, a painting by Raja Ravi Varma.

King Bhima of Vidarbha remains childless for a long time. One day, the hermit Dama arrives at his palace and blesses him and his queen, resulting in the birth of a daughter, Damayanti, and three sons—Dama, Danta, and Damana. Damayanti grows up to be renowned for her exceptional beauty and virtues, attracting the admiration of many suitors. Among them is Nala, the noble and accomplished king of Nishadha, who is equally celebrated for his handsomeness and virtue. Upon hearing of each other's qualities, Damayanti and Nala become mutually enamored.

One day, a group of golden-hued swans sent by Nala arrives at Damayanti’s palace gardens. As Damayanti and her attendants play near the water, they notice these extraordinary birds. Intrigued, she follows them, and the swans do not flee. Instead, one of the swans speaks to her, describing the virtues, appearance, and qualities of Nala. It tells her that he is unmatched in strength, nobility, and righteousness, and would make a worthy husband. Damayanti listens intently, captivated by these descriptions, and develops a deep longing for Nala. After delivering this message, the swan returns to Nishadha and approaches Nala. It recounts its encounter with Damayanti, speaking of her beauty, intelligence, and grace. Nala, who has already heard of her, is now even more drawn to her. Thus, before meeting in person, they both fell in love. Damayanti's despondent demeanor and infatuation alarms her companions, who informs her father.

=== Marriage ===
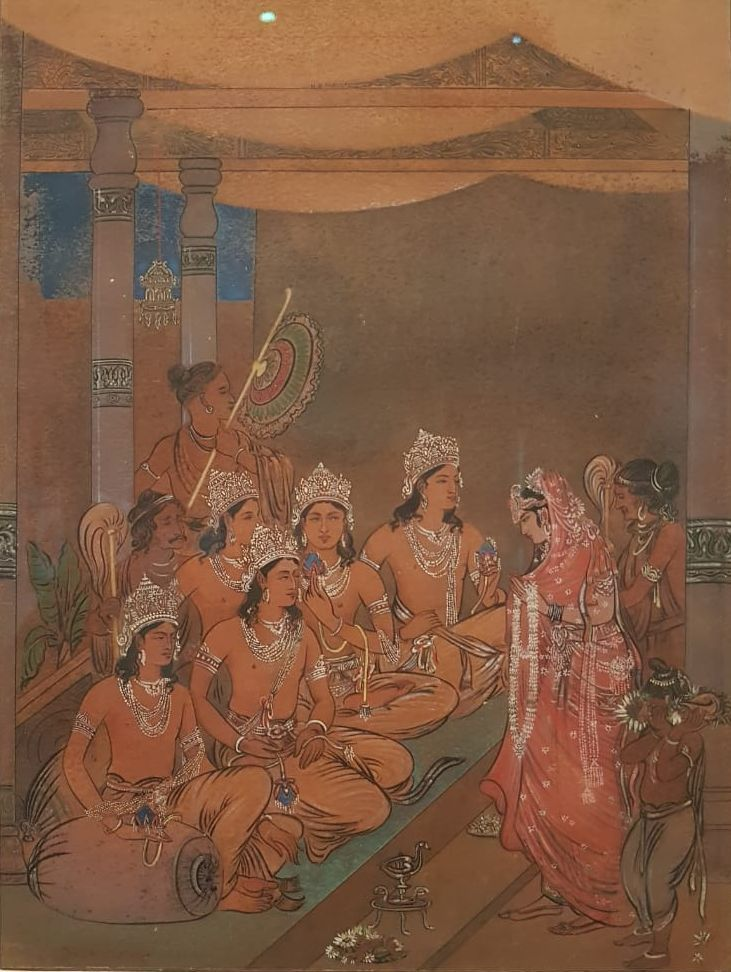
Damayanti choosing her husband from a group of suitors who all appear to be Nala. Painting by Nandalal Bose.

In due time, King Bhima arranges a swayamvara for Damayanti, where she will choose her husband from among assembled kings and princes. Nala sets out for Vidarbha to attend the ceremony. Meanwhile, the gods Indra, Agni, Varuna, and Yama, having heard of Damayanti’s beauty from Narada, also decide to seek her hand in marriage. On their way to the swayamvara, the gods encounter Nala. Aware that Damayanti is already in love with him, they ask him to deliver a message, urging her to choose one of them instead. The gods grant Nala temporary invisibility, allowing him to enter Damayanti’s chambers unnoticed. He delivers their message, but Damayanti remains resolute in her decision to marry Nala. At the swayamvara, the four gods assume the appearance of Nala, making it impossible for Damayanti to distinguish the real one. She prays for divine guidance, and in response, the gods reveal their true forms, allowing her to identify and choose Nala. She garlands him, confirming her choice. As a wedding gift, the gods grants several boons, including sacrificial privileges, fire immunity, a divine palate, presence of water, and a garland. Nala and Damayanti are married and lived happily. Twin children are born to the couple.

=== Exile ===
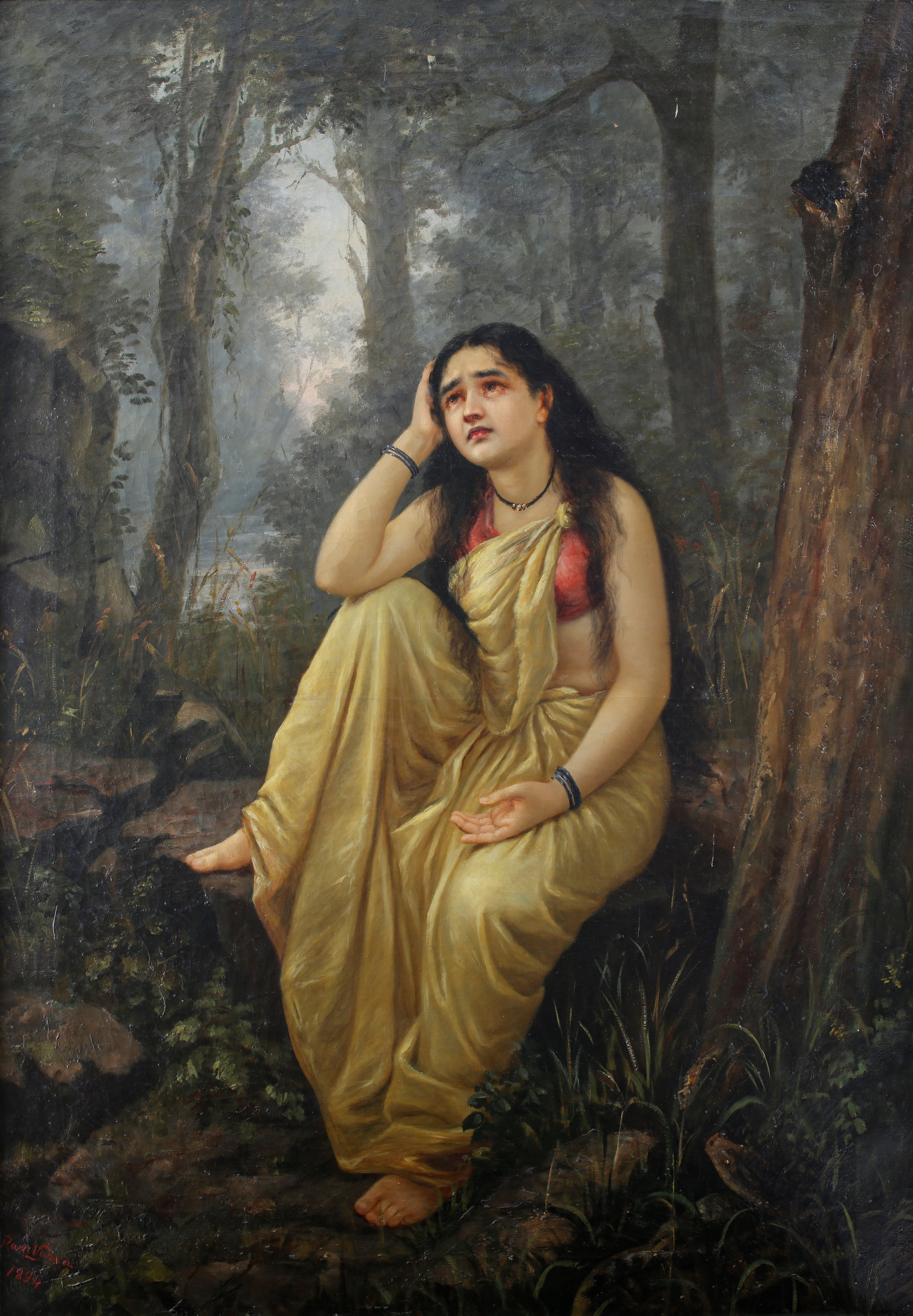
Damayanti in the forest by Raja Ravi Varma.

The gandharva Kali, upon hearing of the swayamvara, is enraged that Damayanti has chosen a mortal over the gods. Along with Dvapara, who manipulate dice, he travels to Nishadha, intending to ruin Nala. Under Kali’s influence, Nala becomes obsessed with gambling and challenges his younger brother Pushkara to a game of dice which spans for several months. Deprived of his usual wisdom, Nala loses repeatedly. Despite pleas from Damayanti and the citizens, he continues playing until he loses his kingdom, wealth, and possessions. Realizing the danger, Damayanti sends their twins, Indrasena and Indrasenā, to her father’s palace in Vidarbha under the care of the charioteer Varshneya. Meanwhile, Nala, left with nothing, is banished from Nishadha, and Damayanti chooses to follow him into exile, donning a single garment each.

Even as they suffer from fatigue and hunger, Damayanti refuses to leave her husband's side and suggests that they go to her father's kingdom. Nala, however, rejects the idea, believing their current circumstances make it impossible. Eventually, the couple arrives at a public dwelling house. Still under the influence of Kali, Nala abandons his sleeping wife, reasoning that she would be safer and happier without him.Though he returnes several times that night, Kali’s influence prevailes, and he ultimately leaves. When Damayanti stirs, she laments his actions, calling him cruel and wondering how he will survive without her. She curses the being responsible for her husband's misfortune, wishing them harm. As she moves aimlessly, a large snake captures her and begins to swallow her. She cries aloud for help, and a hunter arrives, cutting the snake open and saving her. However, upon seeing Damayanti, the hunter becomes overwhelmed with desire and tries to force himself upon her. In anger, she curses him, causing him to fall dead instantly. Damayanti's maddening grief is described in detailed; she wanders the forest, speaking to animals, a mountain and trees. After three days, she finds a hermitage where the sages foretell her reunion with Nala, then vanishes.

=== In Chedi and return to Vidharba ===
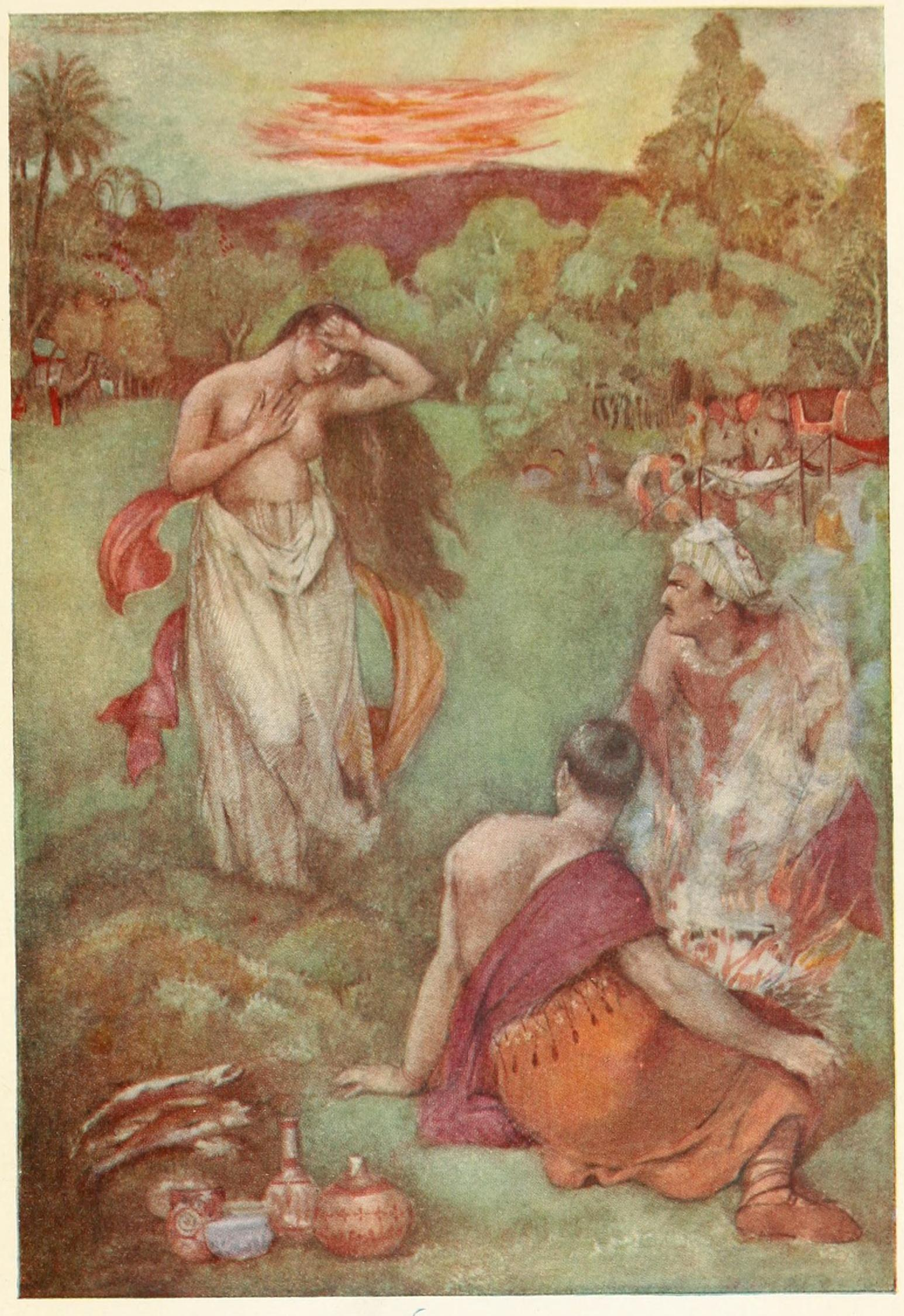
Damayanti encountering the traders, 20th century illustration

While wandering in the forest, Damayanti comes upon a large caravan near a river. Disheveled, injured, and dressed half-clad, she approaches the travelers, who react with a mix of fear, suspicion, and pity. Some believe she might be a goddess or spirit of the forest, but Damayanti reveals her identity as a mortal princess, wife of Nala, whom she is desperately seeking. She joins the caravan, which is headed to the kingdom of the Chedi. One night, as the caravan rests in the forest, it is trampled by a herd of elephants. Many are killed in the chaos, but Damayanti survives and is blamed for the misfortune. She continues her journey in sorrow and eventually reaches the city of the Chedi.

Damayanti wanders the streets, attracting the attention of onlookers. Mistaking her for a madwoman, street boys begin to follow and mock her. The queen-mother, observing this from the palace, feels compassion for the distressed woman and sends her maid to bring Damayanti inside. When questioned, Damayanti reveals her hardships but does not disclose her true identity. The queen-mother offers her shelter and appoints her as an attendant to her daughter, Sunanda. However, Damayanti sets strict conditions—she refuses to eat leftovers, will not wash other's feet, will not interact with unrelated men, and demands that anyone who makes improper advances toward her be punished. The queen-mother agrees, and Damayanti begins her life in the palace.

In Vidarbha, King Bhima remains unaware of his daughter’s fate and continues searching for both Damayanti and Nala. He sends Brahmins across various kingdoms with the promise of generous rewards for any information. One of these Brahmins, Sudeva, reaches Chedi and immediately recognizes Damayanti, despite her disheveled appearance. When he approaches her in private, she confirms her identity. Sunanda, witnessing the encounter, informs her mother. The queen-mother, deeply moved, reveals that she and Damayanti’s mother are sisters, both being daughters of King Sudama of Dasarna, making them family. Subahu, the king of Chedi, upon learning the truth, arranges for Damayanti’s return to Vidarbha in a palanquin. She reaches her father’s palace safely and reunites with her grieving family.

Elsewhere, Nala had rescued a naga from a forest fire. In gratitude, the naga transformed Nala into a hunchback and weakened Kali’s hold on him with venom. Nala, now disguised, was advised to seek employment with King Rituparna of Ayodhya and took the name Bahuka.

=== Reunion ===
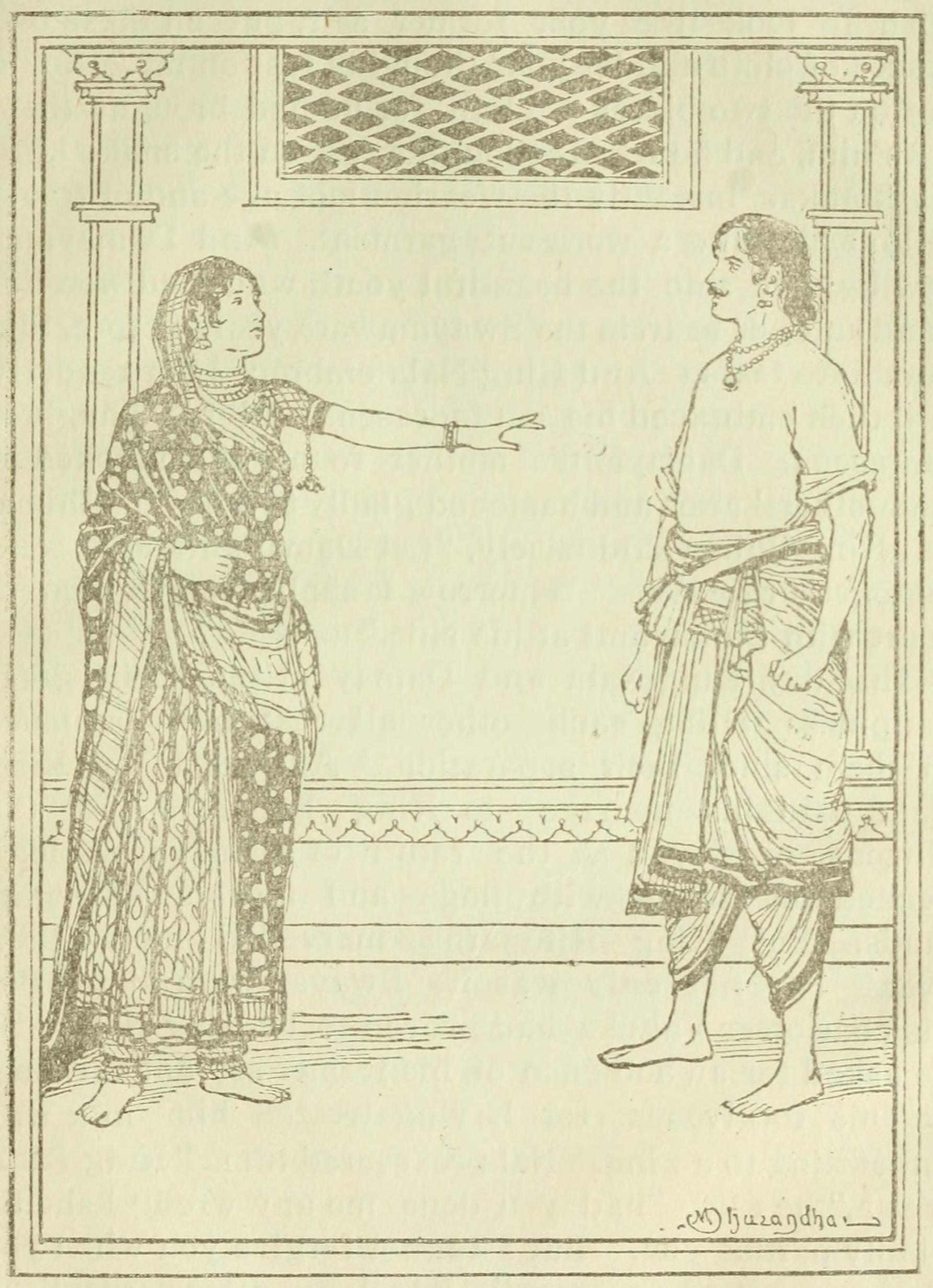
Damayanti confronts Nala, illustration by MV Dhurandhar

After returning to Vidarbha, Damayanti remains inconsolable and refuses remarriage. Determined to find Nala, King Bhima sends Brahmins across kingdoms. One of them, Parnada, reaches Ayodhya and meets Bahuka, King Rituparna’s charioteer. Noting Bahuka’s exceptional charioteering skills and emotional reaction to Damayanti’s name, Parnada reports back to her. Suspecting Bahuka to be Nala in disguise, Damayanti devises a test.

She sends Sudeva to Ayodhya with an announcement of a false second swayamvara, knowing that only Nala possesses the ability to drive a chariot fast enough to reach Vidarbha within a single day. Rituparna, eager to attend, orders Bahuka to drive him. Upon arrival, she recognizes the roar of Nala’s chariot. Still cautious, she sent her servant Keshini to test Bahuka with her verses which Damayanti earlier used to recite to Nala; Bahuka responded with Nala’s. Keshini also confirms divine signs: rising lintels, immediate fire and water, an unfading garland. Bahuka’s cooking also tastes exactly like Nala’s, and he weeps upon seeing his children. Convinced that he is Nala, she arranges a direct meeting. Confronting him, she questions his abandonment. Nala, overcome with emotion, explains his actions under Kali’s influence, and reveals that he is heartbroken by her announcement of remarriage. At that moment, the wind god Vayu proclaims Damayanti’s unwavering fidelity and plan to lure Nala out.

Nala regains his true form. With their identities confirmed, Damayanti and Nala reunite. King Bhima and the citizens of Vidarbha rejoice. Shortly after, Nala returns to Nishadha, challenges Pushkara to another game of dice, and this time wins. He reclaims his kingdom but chooses to forgive his brother. Damayanti and their children join him, and Nala rules wisely, restoring prosperity to his people.

== Translations ==
Norman Mosley Penzer translated the tale of Nala and Damayanti in 1926 into English.

== See also ==
- The Story of Nal and Damayanti in Bhakti and Sufism Accounts
- Damajanti, a 1903 cantata by Max Bruch based on the poem Nala and Damajanti by Friedrich Rückert, with excerpts from a poem by Heinrich Bulthaupt.
- Odysseus and Penelope
- Nala and Damayanti
