= Karkotaka =

Naga in Hinduism

- Affiliation: Naga
- Texts: Mahabharata

Genealogy
- Parents: Kashyapa (father), Kadru (mother)
- Siblings: Shesha, Vasuki, Manasa, Takshaka, and the rest of the Naga race

Karkotaka (Sanskrit: कर्कोटक, romanized: Karkoṭaka) is a naga king in Hinduism. One of the children of Kashyapa and Kadru, Karkotaka is regarded to have lived in a forest near the Nishadha Kingdom. According to Hindu mythology, he stings King Nala, transforming him into a twisted and ugly shape.

== Legend ==
Karkotaka once deceived Narada, the divine sage, in a game of chance. Angered, Narada cursed him that he would remain stationary in the forest until he is saved by King Nala. In the Mahabharata, Karkotaka encountered King Nala when there was a wildfire in the forest where he dwelt, calling out to the king to rescue him. Reducing himself to the size of a thumb, he urged Nala to save him, and the king promptly moved the serpent to a safer spot. Thus, he was freed from Narada's curse. Karkotaka asked the king to step forward ten steps, and after he did so, stung him, causing him to turn ugly. The serpent explained that he had stung the king because the malevolent Kali had possessed him, and the latter should have to suffer for it. He assured Nala that he would face no danger and be undefeatable in battle as long as the poison remained in his body. He then asked Nala to go to Rituparṇa, King of Ayodhya, and work for him as a charioteer under the alias Bahuka. He told the king to teach Rituparna the Aśvahṛdaya mantra, and learn the Akṣahṛdaya mantra in exchange, after which he would be reunited with his family. He also offered Nala two garments, which he could wear to regain his original form. It is believed that dwelling on Karkotaka allows one to be safeguarded against the asura Kali.

He is counted among the Eight Naga Kings in Hindu sources.

== Tibetan Buddhism ==
In the Nāga Menaka offering, Karkotaka is described as being white in color and situated in the southwest of the great lake visualized by the meditator.

== See also ==
- Kadru
- Manasa
- Shesha
