= Kantilal Vyas =

Gujarati writer from India

- Born: 21 November 1910; Hampura, Surendranagar district, British India
- Died: 23 March 1991 (aged 80)
- Education: Gujarat College, Ahmedabad; M.T.B. College, Surat
- Occupations: linguist, critic and editor
- Writing career
- Language: Gujarati

Kantilal Baldevram Vyas (21 November 1910 – 23 March 1991) was a Gujarati linguist, critic and editor from Gujarat, India. He published several works in the field of linguistics including Bhasha Vijnan, Bhasha, Vrutt ane Kavyalankar, Gujarati Bhashano Udgam, Vikas and Swaroop (Origin, Development and Form of Gujarati language) and Bhasha Sanshodhan.

== Life ==
Kantilal Vyas was born on 21 November 1910 at Hampura, a village in the Surendranagar district of Gujarat in India. After finishing his schooling in 1926, he studied Bachelor of Arts and received a degree in History and Economics in the year 1930 from Gujarat College, Ahmedabad. He further studied Master of Arts and received a degree in Gujarati and Sanskrit in the year 1933 from M.T.B. College, Surat. He received the degree of D.Lit. in 1968 from Gujarat University for his research in linguistics and old Gujarati.

He died on 23 March 1991.

== Career and contribution ==
Vyas was a scholar of linguistics, grammar, and old and medieval Gujarati literature. He edited several old and medieval Gujarati manuscripts. He edited Vasantavilas, an old Gujarati fagu poem, in English and Gujarati. He also edited Kanhadade Prabandha of Padmanābha (Vol. I, in English and Gujarati), Char Gujarati Phagu Kavyo (of the 15th century), Ranmall Chhand, Apabharmsha of Hemchandra (1982) and Mamerun of Premanand (in collaboration with Chimanlal Trivedi). He was appointed the Fellow of Royal Asiatic Society of Great Britain and Ireland in 1948 and as the President of Professor Association of Gujarati in 1963.

He was the head of Gujarati Department at Elphinstone College, Mumbai from 1937 to 1959 and thereafter became the principal of various government colleges including M. N. College, Visnagar (1959–1965), Dharmendrasinh College, Rajkot (1965–1966), Samaldas College, Bhavnagar (1966–1967), Mithibai College, Mumbai (1968–1971), C. M. College, Viramgam (1971–1974) and Shoorji Vallabhdas Arts and Commerce College, Mandvi (1974–1975). He retired in 1975.

== See also ==
- List of Gujarati-language writers
