= Raman Soni =

Indian critic and translator

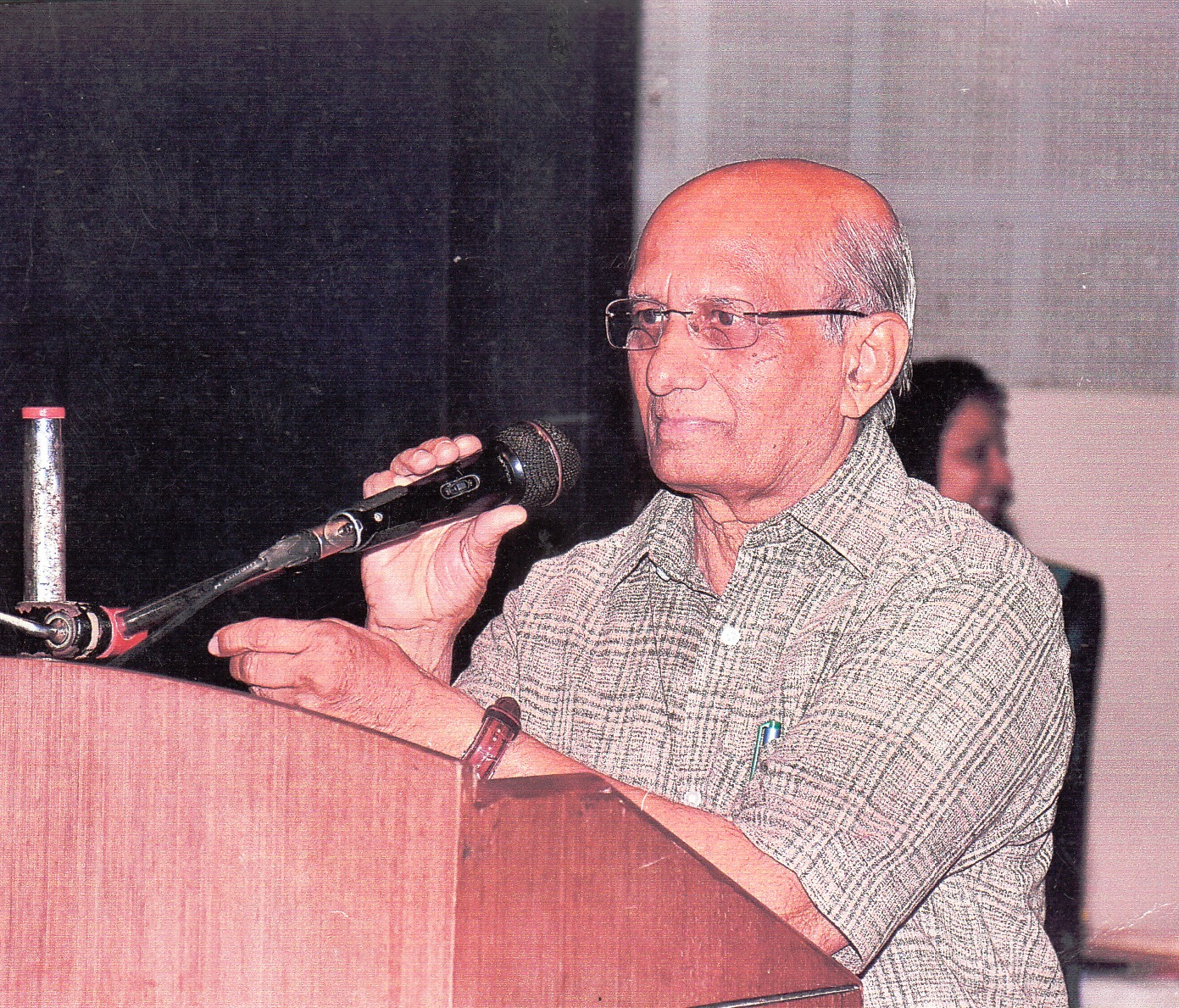
- Born: 7 July 1946 (age 80); Chitroda, Idar (now in Sabarkantha district of Gujarat), India
- Education: PhD
- Alma mater: L. D. Arts College, Ahmedabad
- Occupations: literary critic, editor, translator and bibliographer
- Writing career
- Language: Gujarati

Academic background
- Thesis: Ushnasnu Sarjan Ane Vivechan (1980)
- Doctoral advisor: Chimanlal Trivedi

Raman Kantilal Soni (born 7 July 1946) is a Gujarati literary critic and editor from Gujarat, India. He taught Gujarati at various colleges in Gujarat. He edited Pratyaksha, a literary criticism magazine, from 1991 to 2017. He has edited several collections of short stories and poetry as well as catalogs and writer-specific collections.

== Biography ==
Raman Soni was born on 7 July 1946 in Chitroda village near Idar (now in Sabarkantha district of Gujarat). He completed SSC in 1963. He completed BA in 1967 from L. D. Arts College, Ahmedabad and MA in 1969 from Gujarat University. He served as a professor in the Arts-Science College in Petlad in 1970–71. He served as the professor of Gujarati and later the Head of the Department in Arts-Commerce College in Idar from 1971 to 1989. He received PhD in 1981 for his thesis Ushnasnu Sarjan Ane Vivechan on Gujarati writer Ushnas. He joined the Department of Gujarati in Maharaja Sayajirao University of Baroda in 1989 as a reader and retired as the professor. From 1980 to 1985, he served as an editor and co-editor of Gujarati Sahityakosh published by Gujarati Sahitya Parishad. He founded and edited Pratyaksha, the only Gujarati literary criticism magazine of its time, from 1991 to its closure in 2017. He has worked as an honorary secretary and later as the president of Gujarati Adhyapak Sangh. He was a member of advisory committee of Sahitya Akademi.

== Works ==
Soni has published several works of literary criticism including Kavitanu Shikshan (1978, with Manilal H. Patel), Vivechansandarbh (1994), Sabhipray (1998), Samaksh (2001), Paroksh-Pratyakshe (2004), Mathavu Na Mithya (2009), Giridharo ane Pichchhdahroni Vachche (2013), Pratyakshiya (2018) and Mari Nazare (2022). He wrote three works on writer-specific criticism: Khabardar (1981) on Ardeshar Khabardar, Ushnas: Sarjak Ane Vivechak (his thesis on Ushnas, 1984) and Krishnalal Shridharani (1998) on Krishnalal Shridharani.

He has edited the collections of short stories and poetry as well as catalogs and writer-specific collections. The short stories collections edited by him include Bhupesh Adhvaryu's Hanuman Lav Kush Milan (1995), Ramnarayan V. Pathak's Dwirefni Uttam Vartao (1999) and 2001ni Shreshth Vartao (The Best Stories of 2001, published in 2002). He edited poetry collections such as Krishnalal Shridharani's Shridharanina Uttam Kavyo (2000), Gujarati Kavitachayan 1995 (1998) and Ushnas's Chahera Ane Rasto (1999). Vidyaparva (2002) includes the academic articles published in the remembrance conference held following deaths of Harivallabh Bhayani and Jayant Kothari. Nepathyethi Prakashvartulma (1996) is a collection of articles by 45 Gujarati editors regarding their editing activities. Samayik Lekhsuchi (2006) includes the list of articles published in 22 magazines between 1996 and 2000. He edited Premanand's three works: Chandrahasakhyan (1995), Nalakhyan (2005) and Okhaharan (2005). Other works edited by him include Roopaksaptak (2003), Gujarati Sahityano Itihas Series 1-4 (History of Gujarati Literature, published 2001–2005) as well as Anuvad: Siddhant Ane Samiksha (2009). He has edited Avalokan-vishva (2017), a collection of articles on 85 contemporary Indian and foreign language works.

He translated two works in Gujarati: Totto-Chan: The Little Girl at the Window as Tottochan (2001) and Peter Bichsel's Kindergeschichten as America Chhe Ne, Chhe Ja Nahi, a collection of children's stories.

== See also ==
- List of Gujarati-language writers
