= Manbhatt =

Manbhatt were Brahmin priests of south Gujarat (India) narrating stories called Akhyanas to the accompaniment of music played on copper-made water pitcher or large globular metal pot (man) having a narrow mouth and bloated mid-part, used for beats of rhythmic beating time as required. The manbhatt has been an important fixture in the religious lives of middle-class Gujaratis for several hundred years. Today, this once extremely popular art of story-telling is almost extinct.

The narrative consists of stories from the epics, the Puranas, and from everyday life. The singer uses fingers with metal rings to slap rhythmically the shoulders of the man. Further accompaniment is provided by cymbals (jhanjh), barrel drum (pakhavaj), tabla, and harmonium.

The communities of Charanas and Bhats have been composing and reciting epic verses celebrating the exploits of their royal patrons. They use the raso (rasa or rasaka), a structure consisting of several poems that each tell a portion of the story, depict a scene, or speak in the voice of a character. The main raso forms are doha (couplet) and chhand (extended metre). A variant of the doha is the soratha. The number of syllables per line is the same in both forms; however, in doha the first half of the line is longer and the rhyme occurs at the end of the line, whereas in sorath the second half of the line is longer and the rhyme occurs in the middle. In chhand, the metrical structure has many forms.

According to scholar Krishnalal Jhaveri, at the time when the art of printing and printing process were not even developed, these story-tellers used to pick up stories from the Puranas (also the stories written by the newly emerging writers) and narrate them to the accompaniment of Man, before their audiences of near and far off places that they visited. Thereby, besides regaling their listeners, they used to bolster up their religious sentiments, too.

The distinguishing quality or the ingenuity of these story-tellers or public-preachers was that they were superb singers and music composers besides being well-versed actors and performers having a marvelous sense of rhythm. Due to their extraordinary mastery over music and the art of performing, these well skilled story-tellers could make their audience laugh heartily or shed tears pathetically at will.

== See also ==
- Akhyana
- Fagu
