= Nalakhyan =

Medieval Gujarati narrative poem by Premanand Bhatt (around 17th-century)

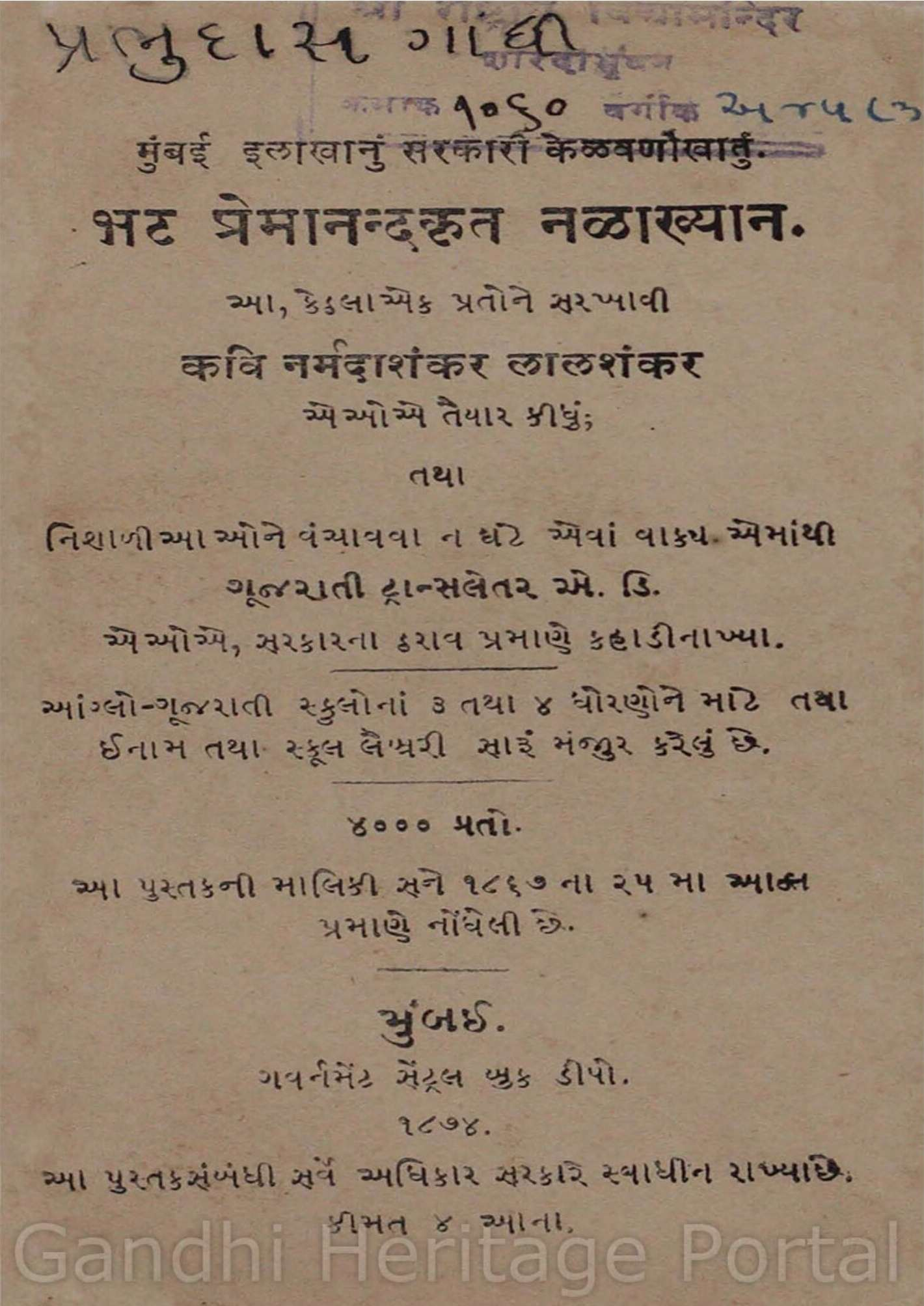
Title page of Nalakhyan, edited and published by Narmad in 1874

Nalakhyan (Gujarati pronunciation: [nəɭakyan̪]; English: The Tale of Nala) is a medieval Gujarati akhyana (long narrative poem), written by 17th-century Gujarati poet Premanand Bhatt (1649–1714). One of Premanand's most popular works, it retells the story of the mythical Hindu king Nala and his queen Damayanti. Through the machinations of Kali, an embodiment of the forces of evil, Nala and Damayanti are sent into exile, separated, and each subjected to a series of trials and reversals. Finally, when with Kali departs, they are reunited and restored to their former happiness.

Although the plot is largely based on the Nalopakhyana in the Mahabharata, Premanand adds several episodes of his own invention. The main theme of Nalakhyan is pathos, and the work reflects the Hindu ideal of married life.

== Background ==
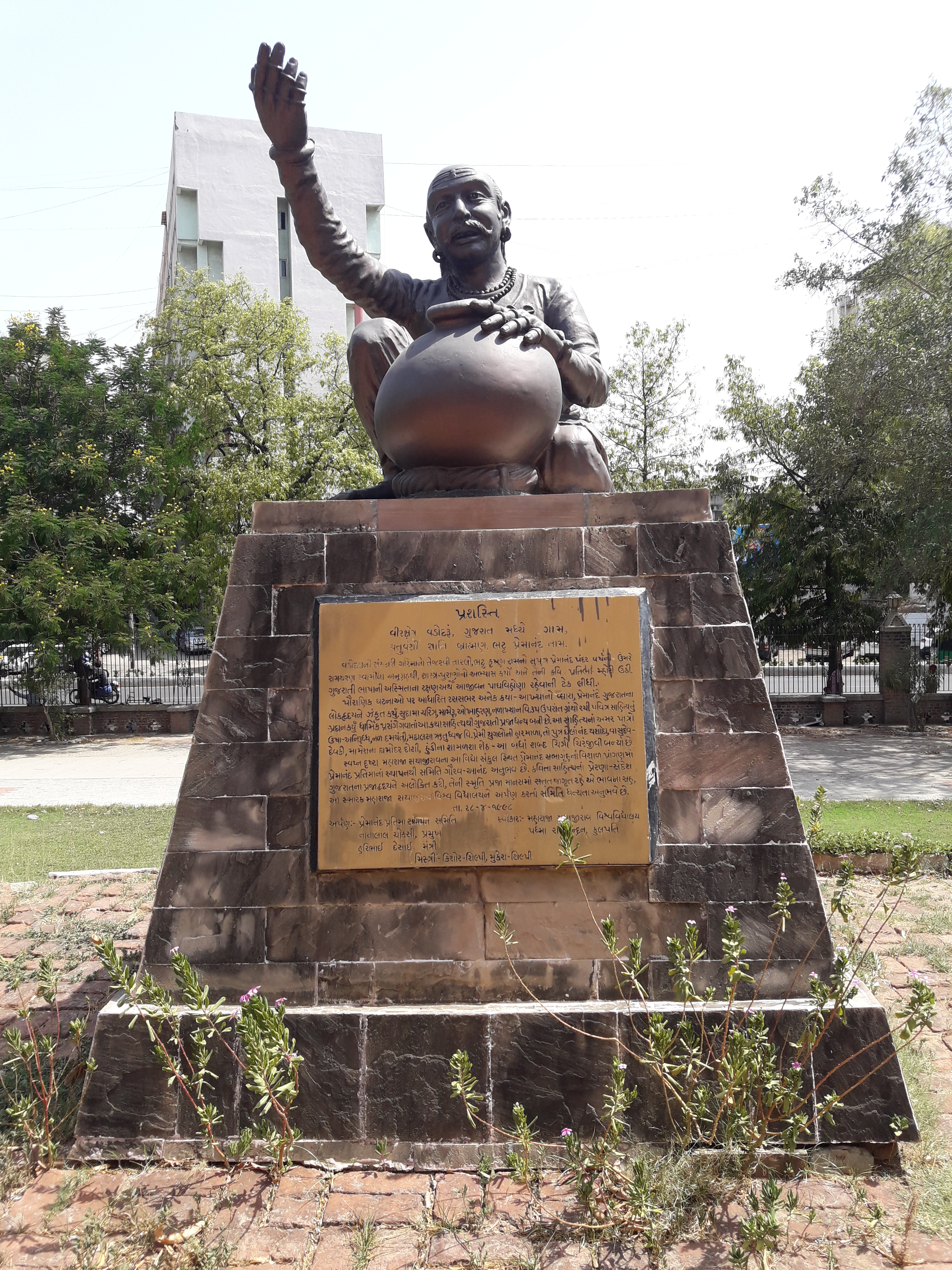
Statue of Premanand, Faculty of Arts, M. S. University, Vadodara

Premanand Bhatt was a professional reciter of mythical stories. He selected events from the old texts and reconstructed them, adding new incidents. Nalakhyan recreates and adapts the Nalopakhyana, or story of King Nala and his queen, Damayanti, in chapter 27 of the Vana Parva, the third parva (book) of the Mahabharata. Premanand combines the mythical story with contemporary elements to bring it closer to his audience. The work was composed in 1685.

== Characters ==
The main characters of the poem are:

- Nala – king of the Nishadha Kingdom
- Damayanti – Nala's wife, and princess of the Vidarbha Kingdom
- Rituparna – king of Ayodhya
- Bhanumati – Damayanti's aunt

== Plot ==
Nala's fame inspires his cousin and commander-in-chief, Virsen, to adopt the life of an ascetic. Nala is a bachelor, as he cannot find a suitable partner. Hearing this, a visiting sage, Narada, sings the praises of the daughter of Bhimak of Vidarbha. Nala, love-struck, goes into the forest to sublimate his sexual desires. There, he captures a golden swan, the male of a pair. The female swan curses Nala, saying: "May your wife too suffer separation and wail in like manner".

The swan promises to come back to Nala if first allowed to bid farewell to his wife, new-born son, and mother. Nala trusts the swan, and lets him go. The swan returns, true to his word, and the two become friends. Nala asks the swan's help in winning Damayanti's favours. The swan travels to the kingdom of Bhimak, promising results within a month. Finding Damayanti in the palace garden, he praises Nala's virtues and his regal features. Damayanti pleads with the swan to secure her marriage to Nala. The swan makes her a promise, and flies back to Nala with the good news. He gives Nala a glowing description of Damayanti's beauty, and assures him that Damayanti's invitation will soon follow. His job accomplished, the swan departs. Bhimak announces a swayamvara (an ancient Indian practice whereby a girl chooses a husband from a list of suitors), at which Damayanti is to choose her husband from among the assembled princes.

The sage, Narada, goes to the gods of heaven, Indra, Varuna, Agni, and Yama. He describes Damayanti's beauty to them, and entices them to attend the swayamvara. Nala travels to Kundanpur in Vidarbha for the swayamvara. Seeing this handsome young man, the gods are crestfallen. All four take the form of brahmins, secure a promise from Nala, reveal their true identity, and send Nala to Damayanti as a messenger to coax her into marrying one of them. Bound by his promises, Nala dresses as a yogi and goes to Damayanti as a messenger. In her heart, Damayanti has already given herself in marriage to Nala, and so pays no heed to the messenger's persuasive words. The four gods then take Nala's form, and go to the swayamvara. Damayanti is perplexed to see five Nalas at once. The gods curse each other in their jealousy, and become a laughing stock. To embarrass them further, Narada brings the gods' wives to the scene. Finally, Damayanti pleads with them tearfully, saying that they are fatherlike to her. The gods, pleased, bestow five boons on Nala and bless her, saying: "May from your hands flow immortality". Nala and Damayanti then marry.

Narada also tempts Kali and Dwapara, Kali's companion, to compete in the swayamvara. They arrive late, and decide to take revenge on Nala for their defeat. For years, they are unable to harm the righteous king. Finally, taking advantage of a slight oversight by Nala with regard to his physical purity, Kali enters his body. Kala and Dwapar entice Nala's cousin, Pushkara, to seize Nala's kingdom, pitting Nala and Pushkara against each other in a game of dice which Pushkara wins with Kali's help.

Nala and Damayanti send their children to their maternal grandparents and retreat to a forest. There, Kali makes life unbearable for them. Nala catches three fish, which he leaves with Damayanti while he goes fishing for more. The blessings of gods bring the fish back to life, and they jump back into the lake. Nala returns, empty-handed and unsuccessful. He thinks Damayanti has eaten the fish, leaving him hungry, and they quarrel. He does not believe her story, and asks her to return to her parents.

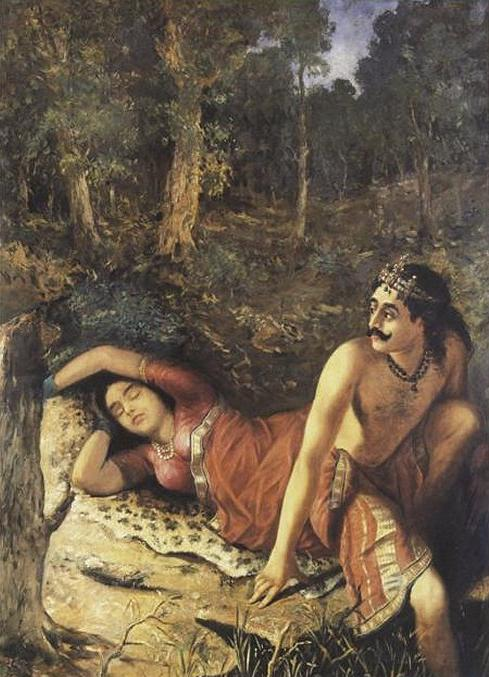
Nala leaving Damayanti while she sleeps, by Raja Ravi Varma

Kali arrives in the form of a huge crane. Nala uses his garment to try to catch the crane, and in the attempt loses his only clothing. Damayanti shares her garment with him. At night, Damayanti's face reminds Nala of the fish incident. He also remembers her virtues, and is torn between two conflicting emotions. Kali comes in the form of a knife. Nala uses the knife to cut their shared garment in two and runs off, abandoning Damayanti in the thick forest.

As he goes, Nala regrets leaving Damayanti and begins to wail. He saves Karkotaka, a cobra, from raging fire, but the cobra bites him, transforming Nala into Bahuka, the ugly one. The cobra narrates his own tale. He consoles Nala, saying that ugliness will make it easy for him to pass incognito, and gives him three garments which will restore his beauty when worn. Nala, as Bahuka, goes to Ayodhya. There, he becomes a horsekeeper to king Rituparna, as he is an expert on horses and knows the Ashwa-mantra, or sacred horse-mastery text.

In the forest, Damayanti wails and cries, searching for Nala. A python catches and partly swallows her leg. A hunter kills the snake and saves her. He tries to touch Damayanti, seeing her beauty, but she curses him and the hunter burns to ash. Damayanti is given shelter by a group of travelling merchants, but Kali makes them believe she is a witch and they beat her. Finally, Damayanti arrives in the town of her aunt Bhanumati, where she stays on as a maid. She is falsely accused of stealing a necklace, but Damayanti prays to God and curses the thief. Kali, who had been hiding in the niche above the door, runs off, tearing off the wooden peg and dropping the necklace on the floor. Seeing this, the queen and her daughter beg pardon.

Sudev, a Brahmin sent by Damayanti's parents to search for her, arrives in the town. Sudev recognises Damayanti, and reveals her identity to her aunt. The aunt's family is sorry and, now showing the appropriate respect, sends Damayanti to her father with Sudev as escort. Damayanti sends Sudev in search of Nala, charging him to sing the secrets of her life. In Ayodhya, Bahuka responds strangely to these verses. Upon hearing this, Damayanti sends Sudev to Rituparna's court once again, keeping this a secret from her parents. Sudev bears the message that there will be a second swayamvara for Damayanti the next day.

With the help of Bahuka, who knows the Ashwa-mantra, Rituparna reaches Damayanti's palace the following day. On the way, Bahuka and Rituparna exchange their knowledge of the Ashwa-mantra and mathematics. The power of these two sciences drives away the evil Kali. Rituparna is unaware of this change. Having heard of Kali's good and evil characteristics, Nala allows Kali to reside in a behada tree, and forbids him to enter his kingdom. Damayanti tests Bahuka in various ways, including with the boons of gods, trying to ascertain his real identity. Finally, she sends the children to him, and this gives her clear confirmation that he is Nala. The two are happily reunited.

== Reception ==
Nalakhyan is the most popular poetic work by Premanand in Gujarati literature. Critic Mansukhlal Jhaveri wrote that Nalakhyan was 'decidedly' the best akhyan in Gujarati literature, adding that Premanand is at his best in bringing out the humour and pathos of the tale.

According to critic Chimanlal Trivedi, the main sentiment of the story is Karuṇā (pathos). According to him, Nalakhyan reflects the Hindu ideal of married life.

== Editions ==
Title	Year of Publication	Editors	Notes
Mahakavi Premanand Krut Nalakhyana (Cantos 1 to 25)	1905 (6th ed.)	Damubhai Dayabhai Mehta, Chhaganlal Thakurdas Modi	With critical and explanatory notes and sketch of the poet's life
Mahakavi Premanand Krut Nalakhyana (Cantos 26 to 50)	1926	Chhaganlal Thakurdas Modi	With critical and explanatory notes and sketch of the poet's life
Nalakhyana, Premanand Krut	1873	–	Prepared for the high-school students of 5th & 6th standard
Premanand Krut Nalakhyana	1886	–	Prepared for the students of 3rd standard (Gujarati & English-medium), with a glossary of difficult words
Bhatt Premanand Krut Nalakhyan	1886 (3rd ed.)	Narmad	Student edition
