= Yagnik =

Yagnik is Hindu Brahmin surname found commonly in western Indian states such as Gujarat, Rajasthan and Maharashtra. It may refer to:

- Alka Yagnik (born 1966), Indian playback singer
- Amrutlal Yagnik, 20th century Indian Gujarati critic, biographer, essayist, editor and translator
- Gangabai Yagnik (1868–1937), Indian Gujarati writer
- Dishant Yagnik (born 1983), Indian cricketer
- Indulal Yagnik (1892–1972), Indian independence activist
- Krishnadev Yagnik (born 1984), Indian film director and screenwriter
