= Amrutlal =

Amrutlal is an Indian masculine given name. Notable people with the name include:

- Amrutlal Yagnik, 20th century Indian Gujarati critic, biographer, essayist, editor, and translator
- Vipul Amrutlal Shah (born 1967), Indian film producer and director
