= Akhyana =

Medieval and traditional genre of music

Akhyana was a traditional musical theatre as well as medieval genre of Gujarati poetry and Rajasthani poetry. It was primarily practiced in Gujarat and Rajasthan states of India.

== Etymology and definition ==
Akhyana literally means to tell or narrate in Sanskrit. The 12th century polymath Hemchandra defined Akhyana in his Kavyanusashana as a side story from religious texts narrated by Granthika (professional storyteller) to instruct audience accompanied by singing and acting. This definition does not include the narration of other non-mythological stories like that of Narsinh Mehta. In general, Akhyana can be defined as the stories narrated by story teller for religious instructions to audience accompanied by singing and acting. Dolarrai Mankad defined it as a form of poetry with musical components and scope of acting.

== Akhyana ==
=== Performers ===
The narrator or professional storytellers who recited Akhyanas were called Manabhatt or Gagaria-bhatt. They set poetry to musical tunes and do mono acting. They wore silver or copper rings on their fingers which were used to sound the beats on overturned copper-made water pitcher or large globular metal pot having a narrow mouth and bloated mid-part. Mana or Gagar literally means pot in Gujarati. Further musical accompaniment was provided by cymbals (jhanjh), barrel drum (pakhavaj), tabla, and harmonium.

Akhyana were recited by Manabhatts belonged to Brahmin caste only thus the Akhyana authored by the person of other castes were given to them for recitation. Nakar is recorded as one such non-Brahmin, Bania caste author in medieval Gujarati literature. They chiefly belonged to south Gujarat.

=== Subjects ===
It is a form of enactment of religious episodes from mythological stories as well as epics like Ramayana, Mahabharata and Bhagavata. Sometimes non-mythological stories of religious devotees like Narsinh Mehta were also enacted.

=== Form ===
Akhyana are divided in several stanzas called Kadavun. Kadavun is derived from Sanskrit word, Kadavak which means 'derived from the conglomeration of lines in different musical tunes and metres'. Kadavun or the recitation has three parts: Mukhabandh (introduction or preamble), Dhal (narration) and Valan (Summary). Mukhabandh is a first two lines which introduces the subject or incident of narration. Dhal is a narration of incident in detail. Valan are the last two lines, first describing summary of incident narrated and second the incident to be narrated. All Akhyanas are narrated in these three part Kadavun. Sometimes when emotions are intense, Pada form is used between narrative and descriptive parts of Akhyana.

As Akhyana is closely related with religious poetry, it begins with obeisance to Ganesha, the god who removes all obstacles, followed by Saraswati, the goddess of learning. After this, the narrator introduced the incident to be narrated taken from mythologies, epics or lives of devotees. After narration, at the end, the narrator cites colophon. The colophon includes the name of author, the date of composition, and some autobiographical information like his residence or place, his father's name or preceptor, information about his family. The poem ends with one or more than one phalashruti, the material benefits of hearing Akhyana. It is added for the purpose of attracting audience. The audience were promised with benefits like eradication of all sins, moksha, end of bodily ailments, child births, wealth. For giving authority to the story, sometimes the original source of story and even cantos were declared. Though the stories are taken from epics and mythologies, sometimes the stories were presented in different manner to entertain the audience. They were tweaked to include the customs and culture of the time to make them contemporary. All Akhyana ends with happy note as seen in Sanskrit theatre tradition.

The length of Akhyana varied greatly, like Sudamacharit which lasts three to four hours when recited to Nalakhyan which was recited to several days.

== History ==
Akhyana is described as form of poetry in the 12th century work of Hemchandra, Kavyanusashana. The 15th century poet, Bhalan wrote large number of Akhyanas including the popular one, Nalakhyan depicting story of Nala-Damayanti. Kunwarbainu Mameru related to life of Narsinh Mehta was also very popular. Nakar of 16th century was one of few non-Brahmin author. Bhoja Bhagat and Shamal Bhatt (17th century) wrote several Akhyana. Veerji (17th century) wrote Balirajanu Akhyan based on story of Mahabali. The Akhyana reached it peak during 16th-17th century. One of the most popular exponents of the art during the time was Premanand Bhatt. He wrote Okhaharan based on Aniruddha-Usha story. It was an important fixture in the religious lives of middle-class Gujaratis for several hundred years. The trend continued to decline thereafter and became almost extinct by 19th century. Later some Gujarati poets of modern times like Balmukund Dave wrote Akhyana as genre of poetry but the performance of Akhyana was never revived. Now it is performed by the groups from Surendranagar and other small towns of Saurashtra.
