= Nakar =

16th-century Gujarati-language poet from Gujarat

Nakar was a 16th-century Gujarati poet from Gujarat who wrote several Akhyanas.

== Biography ==
Very little is known about his life as his verses are the only source regarding his life. His lived in sixteenth century, though it was initially believed that he lived in seventeenth century. He belonged to Disaval Bania caste and lived in Vadodara. He wrote several Akhyana which were recited in public by Manabhatt (professional storytellers belonging to Brahmin caste) as only Brahmins were allowed to do so.

== Works ==
He wrote several poems but only seven are published. Most of them are in Akhyana form to be recited by professional storytellers. He did not write poems in metres but in local tunes (ragas) like Ramagri, Ashavari and Sameri. He wrote Harishchandrakhyan (1516, Vikram Samvat 1572) in Umreth based on story of Harishchandra. His other works include Shiva-vivah (marriage of Shiva, 1544), Chandrahasakhyan, Lavkushakhyan, Dhruvakhyan (1544), Mrigalisamvad, Bhiladi na Bar Mas. Shiva-vivah and Dhruvakhyan were written earlier than 1544 but a Brahmin for whom he wrote was not pleased with its short form so he rewrote and expanded them in 1544. Bhaktamal is about saints of Gujarat which resemble Sadhu Charita of Vasto.

== Studies ==
Chimanlal Trivedi has published a Ph. D. thesis Kavi Nakar - Ek Adhyayan (1966) on him and his published and unpublished works. The followups to this work are included in Nakar (1979) of Gujarati Granthkar series as well as in Gujarati Sahityano Itihas - Volume 2.

== See also ==
- List of Gujarati-language writers
