= Lalsinh Raol =

Indian ornithologist (1925–2019)

Lalsinh Mansinh Raol (26 March 1925 – 21 July 2019) was an Indian ornithologist, nature conservationist and writer from Gujarat. He served on boards of several institutions and wrote some Gujarati books on birds of Gujarat.

== Biography ==
Raol was born on 26 March 1925 in Limbdi (now in Surendranagar district, Gujarat, India) where he studied till matriculation. He studied B.A. (Honors) at Samaldas College, Bhavnagar, between 1943 and 1948. During his college years, he developed an interest in birdwatching and began studying the birds around Bhavnagar. He was mentored by Lavkumar Khachar. He worked in Public Works Department of Government of Gujarat from 1955 to 1983, after which he served for four years from 1985 at the Centre for Environmental Education (CEE) located at Thaltej Tekra, Ahmedabad.

He trained numerous young people in nature camps for environmental preservation and bird conservation. He also served as the President of the Bird Conservation Society Gujarat (BCSG) and was a member of the regional executive of the World Wildlife Fund (India). He has also served as an advisor of BCSG's English mouthpiece Flamingo as well as of Gujarati quarterly Vihang.

He died on 21 July 2019, at the age of 94, in Rajpipla, Gujarat.

== Books ==
He collected information about the birds of Gujarat and wrote several Gujarati books on birds. He coined Gujarati names of several local birds.

- Pankhioni Bhaibandhi (Brotherhood of Birds, 1983)
- Prakruti Parichay (Nature Introduction) series (4 books)
  - Jeevanbharna Sathi – Aaspasna Pankhi (Lifelong Companions – Birds Around Us)
  - Paani na Sangathi (Companions of Water)
  - Weed, Vaghdana Pankhi (Birds of the Forest)
  - Van, Upvan na Pankhi (Garden Birds)
- Birds, Birds, Birds
- Gujarat nu Pankhi Jagat (World of Bird of Gujarat)
- Jeevshrishti (The Living World)
- Pakshio Ane Jantuo (Birds and Insects)

His book Jeevanbharna Sathi – Aaspasna Pankhi received recognition from both the Gujarat Sahitya Akademi and the Gujarati Sahitya Parishad. His work Paani na Sangathi was also honoured with an award by the Gujarat Sahitya Akademi.
