= Yashwant Trivedi =

Indian poet (1934–2024)

Yashwant Trivedi (16 September 1934 – 3 May 2024) was an Indian Gujarati poet, essayist and critic.

== Early life and career ==
Yashwant Trivedi was born on 16 September 1934 in Palitana (now Bhavnagar district, Gujarat) to Ramshankar and Rambhaben. His family belonged to Mahuva. He completed B. A. in Economics and Statistics from Samaldas College, Bhavnagar in 1956. He completed M. A. in Gujarati in 1965. He was awarded Ph.D. in 1979 for his thesis, Kavyani Paribhasha. He served as a professor of Gujarati in several colleges of Mumbai. Later he served as the professor and head of the department of Gujarati in the University of Mumbai. He retired from there. He was the president of literature department of Kalagurjari institute.

== Works ==
Trivedi started writing in 1956. He wrote modern poetry. His first poetry collection Kshitijne Vansvan (1971) has songs and non-metrical poetry. It is followed by Pariprashna (1975). Paridevna (1976) and Pashchima have poems written on the occasion of death of his writer friend Priyakant Maniar and his foreign visit respectively. His other poetry collections are Ashlesh (1988), Enu Koi Naam Hot...! (1998), Radhakrishna Geetika (2000), Gopigeet Bhramargeet (2006), Akhkhi Prithvi Taro Prempatra Chhe (1996). Parishesh (1978) has hundred poems selected by Pramodkumar Patel. Pralambita (1981) has 76 poems explained by various critics and edited by Ramesh Shukla.

Grusdain Got (1982) is his travelogue. Thodik Vasant Todak Bhagvanna Ansu (1982) and Vishwa Pravasna Yadgar Prasango (2004) are the collections of narrative essays near to poetry. Aa Rasto Akash Sudhi Jay Chhe? (2003) and Anam Akash (2003) are his other essay collections. Ahimsanu Darshan (1983), Man Ane Parbrahma (1983), Premdharmnu Jagran (1983), Purnatanu Achchadan (1983), Dharm-Adhyatmachintan (2004), Aa Jindagi Paramatmae Lakheli Parikatha (2005) show him as a thinker and a prose writer. Anadpuram Aavo Chho Ne? (2007) is his novel. Jalvithi (1985) is his short novel exploring love and compassion in aftermath of war. E Sooraj Uge Chhe (1956), Chir Vasant (1960) and Surdasi (1962) are his short story collections. Ashesh Akash (on poets, 1988) and Vishwani Amar Vibhutio (2004) are biographical works.

Kavitano Anandkosh (1970) and Zummaro (1976) are his poetry criticism works for students. Kavyani Paribhasha (1978) is his expansive study on literature. Ishika (1978) and Ashesh Akash (1988) are his works of criticism. Interview (1986) has collections of literary interviews. Bhashavihar (1963) is the work on grammar. Gandhikavita (1969), Swatantryottar Kavita (1973), Ane Sahitya (1975), Sahityakvad (1982), Nagar Jivanna Kavyo (2006) are edited by him.

Trivedi translated Pratiyuddhkavyo (Anti-war Poems, 1977), Pablo Neruda ni Kavita (Pablo Neruda's Poetry, 1981) and Antarrashtriya Kavio (International Poets, 1983) in Gujarati. Yashwant Trivedi - Selected Poems (1979), Gujarati: Language and Literature, The Beacon Light are his English works.

== Personal life and death ==
Trivedi married Jyotsana in Mumbai in 1960 and they had a daughter and a son.

Trivedi died at P. D. Hinduja National Hospital and Medical Research Centre in Mumbai from pneumonia on 3 May 2024, at the age of 89.

== Awards ==
Trivedi was awarded Soviet Land Nehru Award in 1978 for Pratiyuddh Kavyo. He was felicitated with Amruta Sahitya Sanman. He was also awarded Kaka Kalelkar Award for the best essays of the decade. He has also received Best Journalist Award, Chandulal Selarka Sahitya-Kala Gaurav Puraskar, Saraswati Samman, National Award of Sursingar Sansad's National Award for post-independence poetry, five Sahitya Akademi Prizes, Kanaiyalal Munshi Award (2010).

== See also ==
- List of Gujarati-language writers
