= Krishnalal Jhaveri =

Indian writer, scholar and literary historian

Dewan Bahadur Krishnalal Mohanlal Jhaveri
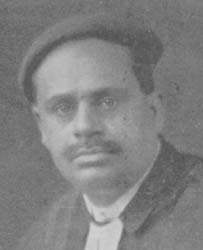
- Born: 30 December 1868; Broach, now Bharuch, British India
- Died: 15 June 1957 (aged 88); Mumbai, India
- Education: MA, LLB
- Alma mater: Elphinstone College
- Occupations: Scholar, literary historian, translator
- Writing career
- Pen name: Rafeeq, Hakir
- Language: Gujarati, English, Persian

Diwan Bahadur Krishnalal Mohanlal Jhaveri (30 December 1868 – 15 June 1957) was an Indian writer, scholar, literary historian, translator, and judge from what is now Gujarat, India. His works have been published in Gujarati, English, and Persian. Jhaveri served as president of the Gujarati Sahitya Parishad from 1931 to 1933.

== Life ==
Krishnalal Jhaveri was born on 30 December 1868 in Broach into a family of educators. His grandfather, Ranchhoddas Girdhardas Jhaveri, was a pioneer in the field of education and laid the foundations for educational services in Gujarat. Jhaveri's father, Mohanlal Ranchhodlal, was co-founded several primary schools in the Surat District.

After finishing school in Broach, Surat, and Bhavnagar, Jhaveri attended Samaldas Arts College in Bhavnagar where he earned a Bachelor of Arts in English and Persian in 1888. In 1890, he finished a Master of Arts degree in English and Persian at Elphinstone College where he began working as a lecturer of the Persian language. After completing a Bachelor of Laws in 1892, he started his career as a lawyer in 1893. Jhaveri practised on the appellate side of the High Court of Bombay from 1903 to 1905. At the Presidency Court of Small Causes he served as a judge from 1905 to 1917 and as a chief judge from 1918 to 1928. Jhaveri also served as chief judge at the High Court of Palanpur State.

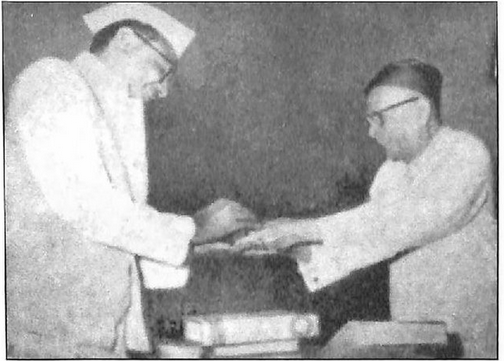
Jhaveri awarding gold medal to Jaybhikhkhu

He was appointed president of Gujarati Sahitya Parishad from 1931 to 1933. He was the president of the Forbes Gujarati Sabha for three decades, one of the founding members of the Bharatiya Vidya Bhavan, a member of the Syndicate of Bombay University, and the vice-chancellor of Shreemati Nathibai Damodar Thackersey Women's University. He was a member of Government Book Committee and Bombay Presidency Social Reform Association and served as joint secretary of Pleader's Association.

He died on 15 June 1957, aged 88, in Mumbai, India.

== Works ==
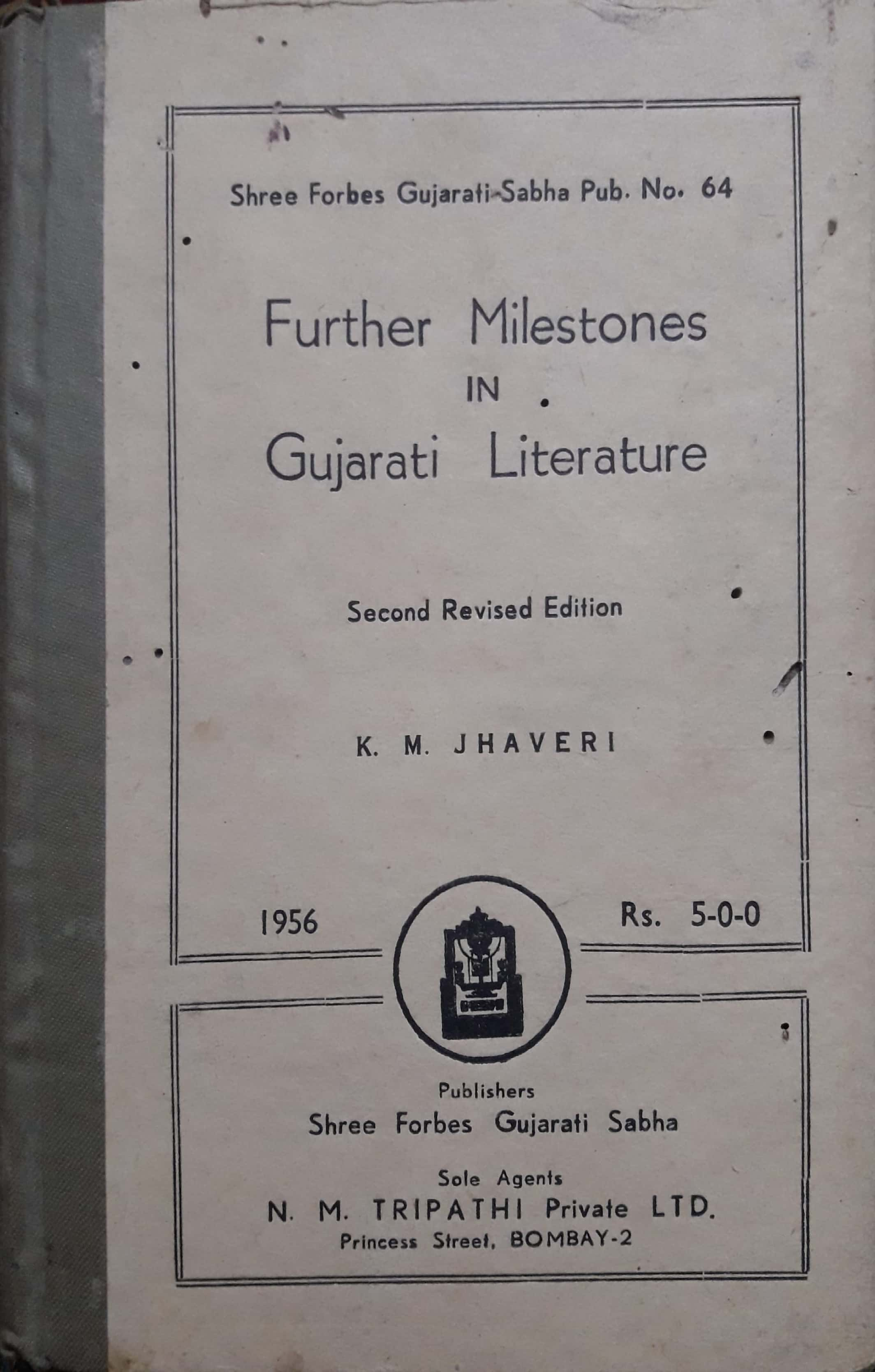
Further Milestones In Gujarati Literature, second revised edition cover, 1956

Jhaveri wrote under the pseudonyms Rafeeq and Hakir. He was a profound scholar of Persian and contributed significantly to the field of literary history.

He wrote the books Milestones in Gujarati Literature (1914) and Further Milestones in Gujarati Literature (1921) which give a detailed history of Gujarati literature from its initial stage to the modern period. Both books have been translated by Ramlal Modi, Motilal Modi, and Hiralal Parekh into Gujarati as Gujarati Sahityana Margasuchak Stambho (1930) and Gujarati Sahityana Vadhu Margasuchak Stambho (1930). He was one of the first to publish a book on Gujarati literary history in English. His other significant works in history include Haiderali Ne Tipu Sultan (1894), Dayaram ane Haphejh (1895), Badshahi Faramano, and Gujarati Lakhela Parsi Granth (1945). He translated several works from Persian, Marathi, Urdu, Bengali and English. Jhaveri translated into Gujarati Ali Muhammad Khan's Mirat-e-Ahmadi, a political and statistical history of Gujarat composed by Khan, an Imperial dewan at Ahmedabad. Jhaveri reviewed a number of Gujarati works and published in Modern Review, a literary journal edited by Ramananda Chatterjee.

== See also ==
- List of Gujarati-language writers
