= Vasantavilas =

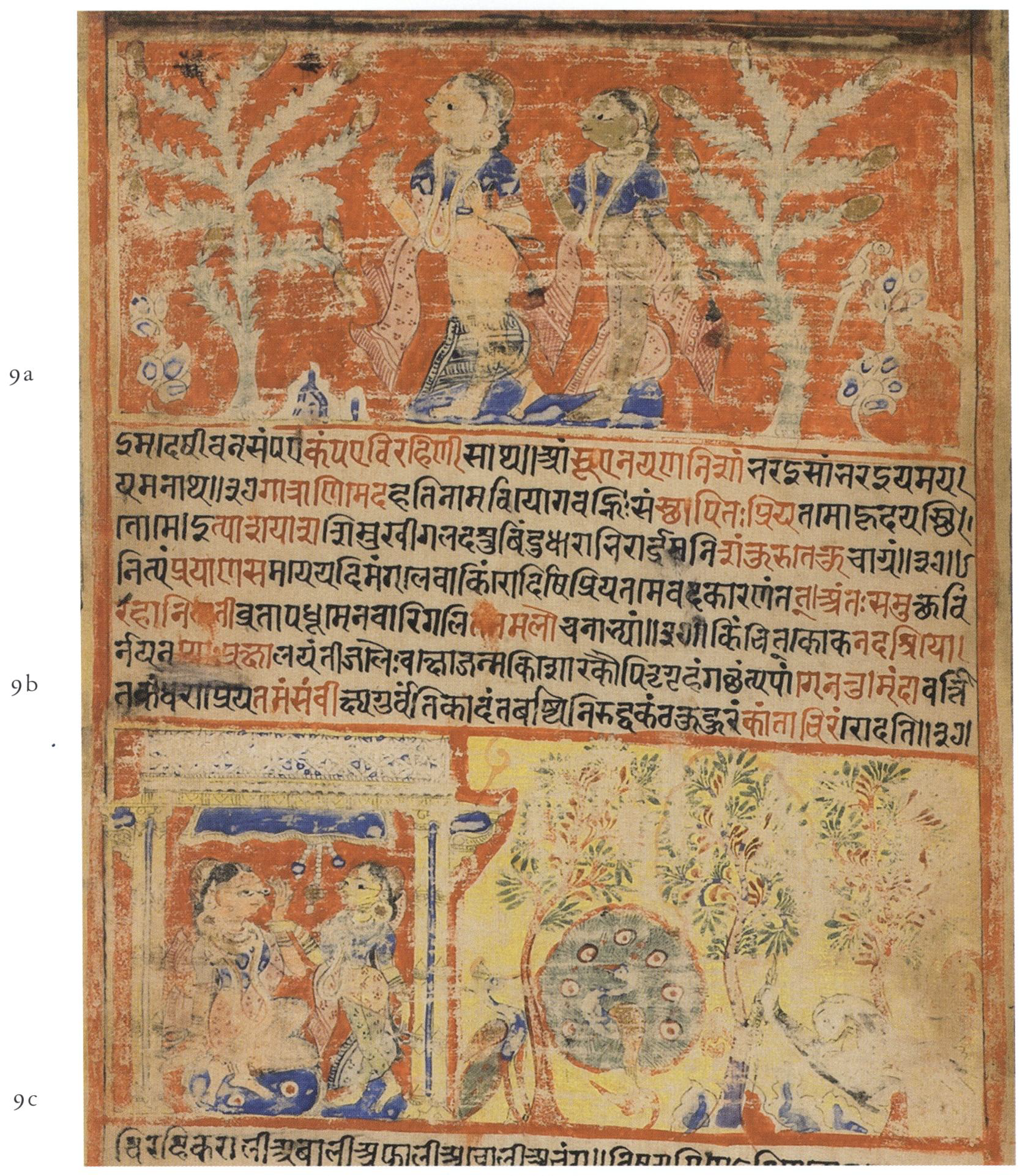
- Structures of desire, Folio from Vasanta Vilasa, 1451 CE manuscript
- Author(s): Unknown
- Language: Old Gujarati
- Date: first half of the 14th-century
- Manuscript(s): Illustrated manuscript containing painting
- First printed edition: 1923 by Keshav Harshad Dhruv
- Genre: Fagu
- Subject: Shringara

Vasantavilas (lit. The Joys of Spring) is a fagu poem by unknown author written in old Gujarati language, believed to be written in first half of the 14th-century. Its theme is the depiction of Shringara, an erotic sentiments. The poem has a significant historical value as it provides linguistic evidence of Old Gujarati.

== Overview ==
Gujarati scholar Keshav Harshad Dhruv first discovered an illustrated manuscript of the Vasantavilas copied in 1455, and published it in Shalapatra. The published version seemed unsatisfied to him as the version needed many editing, he published it again with notes in Haji Muhammad Smarak Granth (1923). In the meanwhile, he found another manuscript from the Bhandarkar Oriental Research Institute, Pune, and with its help, he re-edited the text. In 1943, another scholar Kantilal Vyas published another carefully edited edition of the poem, which aroused interest among scholars in India and abroad. Vyas published its English translation in 1946.

== Authorship and dates ==
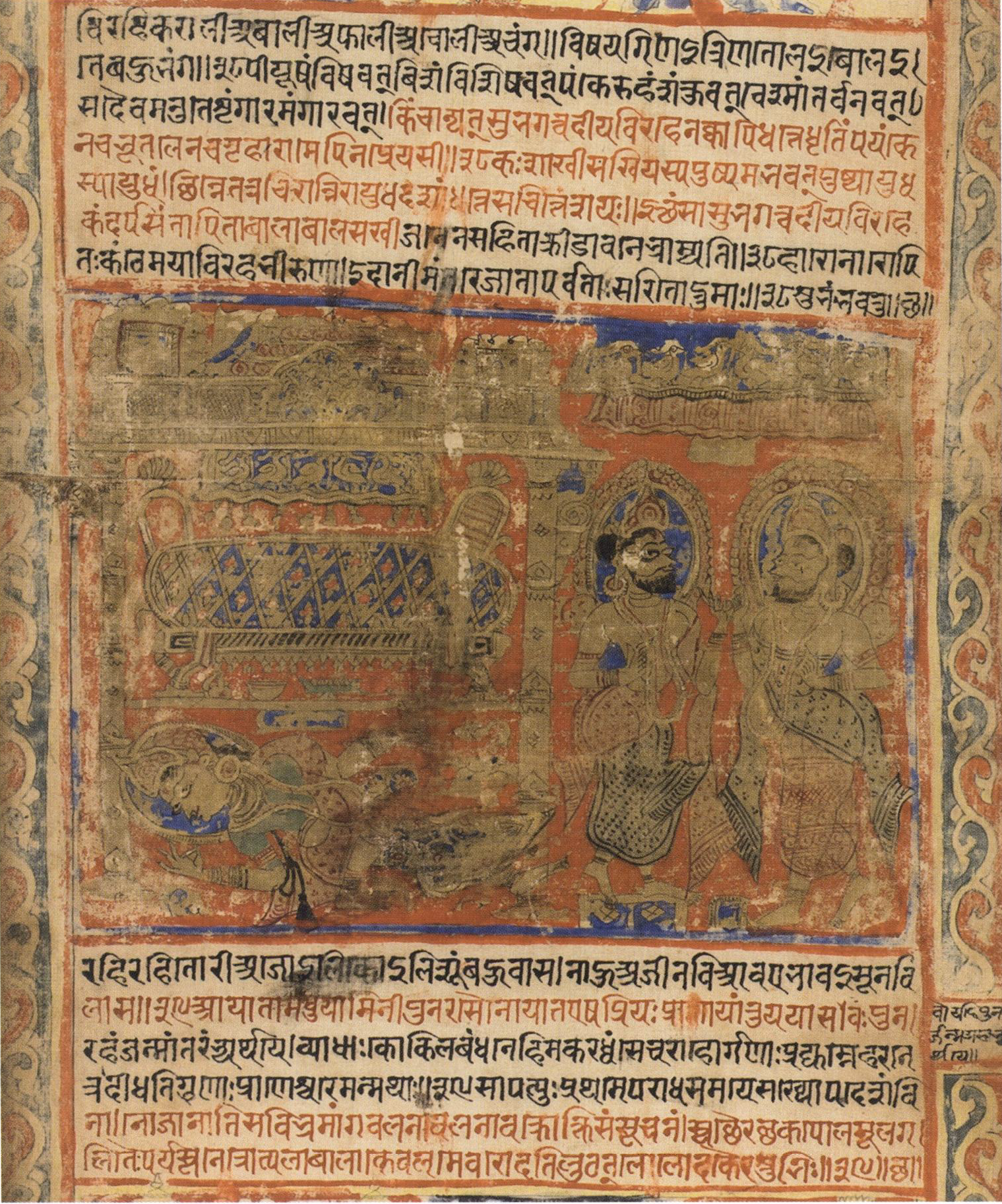
Example of the interweaving of languages and pictorial images, Vasanta Vilasa, 1451 CE manuscript

The colophon of all manuscripts have no details about the author, but according to some scholars the poem was composed by Muni Deva, uncle of Someshvardeva, the royal priest of last Chaulukya king Vastupal. This assumption is based on the discussion in Girvan Vasantiki (Descripation of Spring in Sanskrit Literature). The last verse (Munja vayan ini thai) of the poem referenced to Munja also support this hypothesis.

The fact is uncertain that whether the writer of this poem was a Jain or non-Jain. No mention found in any of the manuscripts. After analyzing the opinions of other scholars and considering the evidence provided by the text itself K. B. Vyas concluded that this is not the work of a Jain, but probably of someone belonging to one of the Brahmanical sects. He sets the date of composition somewhere around V.S. 1400-1425 (1343- 1368 A.D.), basing his decision upon the orthography of the manuscripts and his comparison of the phonology and the morphology of the text with linguistic specimens from the different periods of Old Gujarati.

== Structure ==
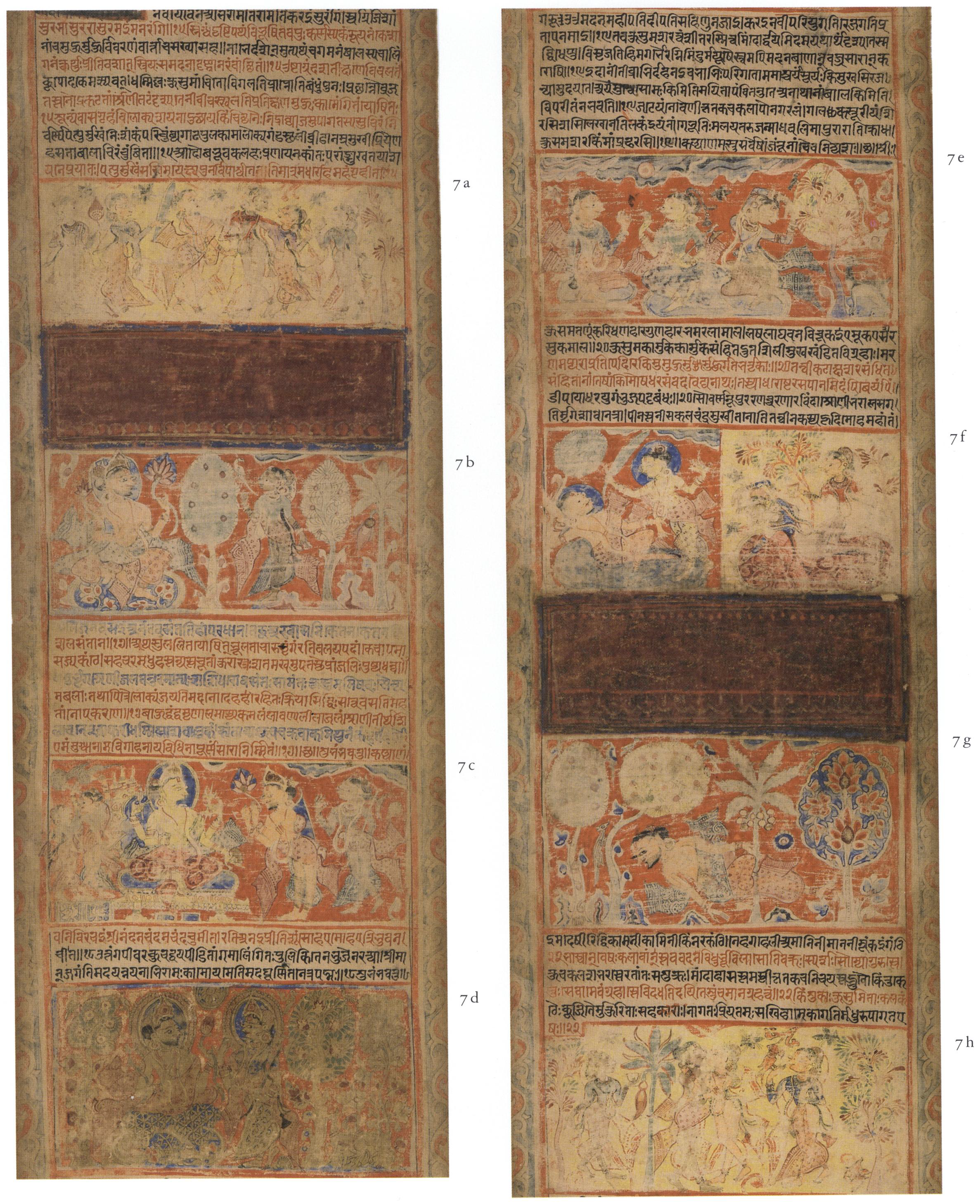
Section of the Vasanta Vilasa, 1451 CE

The poem was found in an illustrated manuscript containing painting in the style of Ajanta.

There are two texts are available of Vasantavilas. First is consist of 52 stanzas while other have 84 stanzas. As the author seems to be a well versed and genuine lover of poetry and beauty, he quoted many Sanskrit and Prakrit verse of renowned poets in this poem. Its metrical form is 'upadohaka', a variety of Doha, a medieval poetic meter. Thematically the poems are divided into two parts. The first part consist of 1 to 45 stanzas which narrates 'separation of couples', and the second part consist of 46 to 84 and it deals with 'union of couples'.

== Synopsis ==
"The breasts are not going to remain stiff for ever; do not behave like a fool, you i diot!
Why are you cross? Youth lasts just for a day or two."

"Get thee gone, you bee! do please leave us alone. Our body is reduced to a fraction, and why do you torture my frame,
O moon! We, certainly, have no old scores to settle."

— Vasantavilas

The poems contains an erotic sentiments (Shringara rasa) with the background of the beauty of spring.

The poem begin with a prayer addressed to Saraswati, the goddess of learning. Then the poet describes the arrival of spring season and its impact on the united or separated couples. Then the garden or the forest described metaphorically as the city of Kamadeva, the god of love. Then it describes the pain of women whose husbands are away. When the husbands return, the couples are engaged in love-ecstasies with full abandon. The women wears new clothes and adorn themselves with beautiful ornaments to celebrate their reunion. Some ladies playfully taunt their lovers for their flirtations when they were away from home. The poem ends with a praise of love.

== Reception ==
The work has significant historical value as it provides linguistic evidence of Old Gujarati. Muni Jinvijay considered Vasantavilas as one of the brightest gems of old Gujarati literature. Kantilal Vyas wrote:

The poem is unique in old Gujarati literature in many respects. In an age when all worthwhile literature was invariably linked up with religion, this poem broke new ground by portraying the exotic sentiment of the common man, eschewing all mythological references. Its language has a rare freshness ad elegance, with a wide classical Sanskrit base. The interspersing of Sanskrit shlokas from well-known classics, the internal alliteration in every verse replete with wonderful imagery, and restrained portrayal of the erotic, render it unique in Gujarati literature.

== Editions ==
- Vasanta Vilasa, an Old Gujarati Phagu, ed. K. B. Vyas, published in 1942 by N. M Tripathi & Co. (with introduction and notes)
- The Vasanta Vilasa, ed. W. Norman Brown, published in 1962 (American Oriental Series), (critical edition with translation and introduction of paintings, with 48 plates)
