= Mangalacharana =

Benedictory verse in Hindu literature

A mangalacharana (Sanskrit: मङ्गलाचरणम्, romanized: maṅgalācaraṇam) or a mangalashloka is a benedictory verse traditionally featured in the beginning of a Hindu text. Composed in the form of an encomium, a mangalacharana serves both as an invocation and a panegyric to an author's favoured deity, teacher, or patron, intended to induce auspiciousness (maṅgalam). The verse may also be in the form of a divine supplication for the removal of obstacles that might obstruct the completion of the work.

The mangalacharana is a common convention in works of Hindu philosophy, beginning and sometimes also ending with the invocation of a deity. It is sometimes regarded to contain the essence of a given text to which it belongs.

== Literature ==
=== Bhagavata Purana ===
The mangalacharana of the Bhagavata Purana addresses Krishna:

oṁ namo bhagavate vāsudevāya
janmādy asya yato ’nvayād itarataś cārtheṣv abhijñaḥ svarāṭ
tene brahma hṛdā ya ādi-kavaye muhyanti yat sūrayaḥ
tejo-vāri-mṛdāṁ yathā vinimayo yatra tri-sargo ’mṛṣā
dhāmnā svena sadā nirasta-kuhakaṁ satyaṁ paraṁ dhīmahi

=== Mahabharata ===
The mangalacharana of the Mahabharata, also featured in the Bhagavata Purana, invokes Narayana (Vishnu), the sages Nara-Narayana, Saraswati, and Vyasa:

nārāyaṇaṁ namaskṛtya naraṁ caiva narottamam
devīṁ sarasvatīṁ vyāsaṁtato jayam udīrayet

=== Vishnu Purana ===
The mangalacharana of the Vishnu Purana propitiates Vishnu:

om namo bhagavate vāsudevāya
om jitam te puṇḍarīkākṣa namaste viśvabhāvana
namaste 'stu hṛṣīkeśa mahāpuruṣa pūrvaja

== See also ==
- Phalashruti
