= Nautam Bhatt =

Indian physicist (1909–2005)

Nautam Bhagwanlal Bhatt (10 April 1909 – 6 July 2005) was an Indian physicist born in Jamnagar, Gujarat. He was the founding Director Solid State Physics Laboratory, Delhi. Nautam was a recipient of Padma Shri Award for his contributions to "Science and Engineering".

== Education and career ==
Bhatt had his schooling in Bhavnagar and early college education at Samaldas College, Bhavnagar, Gujarat. He received his B.A. degree from the Gujarat College in Ahmedabad. He then received his MSc degree in physics under the Nobel Laureate, C. V. Raman, at the Indian Institute of Science (IISc), Bangalore. Following a year of teaching at Samaldas College, Bhatt was awarded a fellowship by the Maharaja of Bhavnagar to pursue the doctorate program at Massachusetts Institute of Technology where he earned his Ph.D. degree in physics in 1939.

He has started his career under Dr. CV Raman in Indian Institute of Science as Scholar of Physics. After Indian Independence he started to work for country and founded "Defense Science Laboratory" and worked for development of defense technologies.

His Major Contributions for science and technology are:

1. Development and deployment of the VT Fuse for the Department of Defense in the mid-1960s.
2. He designed the acoustics of several moderate sized concert halls specifically for Indian Classical Music for a more natural sound.
3. He established the Solid State Physics Laboratory in Delhi and was its founding Director.
4. He established the Central Electronics Engineering Research Institute (CEERI), Pilani.
5. He founded the Electrical Communications Engineering Department at Indian Institute of Science, Bangalore.
6. He was a founding member of the Institution of Electronics and Telecommunication Engineers (IETE).

In 1969 he was awarded the prestigious Padma Shri Award by Indian President Zakir Husain for his great work in the field of "Science and Engineering".

Dr. Bhatt designed the acoustics for several theatres and auditoriums in India, including the Odeon and Sheila Cinemas in New Delhi and the Legislative Assembly Hall in Gandhinagar, Gujarat. He was also a founding member of the Bharatiya Kala Kendra, New Delhi.
