= Old Western Rājasthāni =

Ancestor of the modern Gujarati and Western Rajasthani languages

- Era: Developed around the 8th century and gave rise to the Western Rajasthani languages and Middle Gujarati by the 14th century
- Language family: Indo-European: Indo-Iranian; Indo-Aryan; Western; Old Western Rājasthāni
- Early forms: Vedic Sanskrit: Classical Sanskrit; Shauraseni Prakrit; Gurjar Apabhraṃśa
- Writing system: Devanagari; Mahajani

Language codes
- ISO 639-3: –
- Glottolog: None

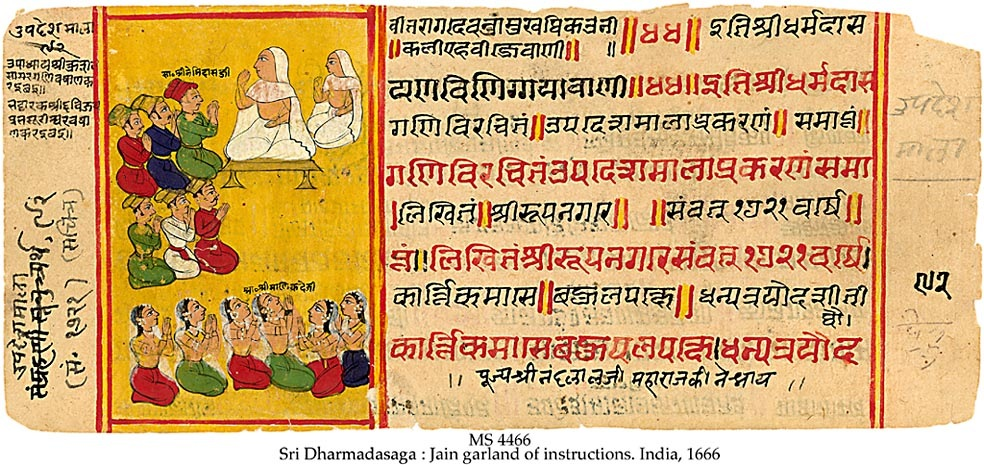
Updeshmala, Manuscript in Jain Prakrit and Old Gujarati on paper, Rupnagar, Rajasthan, India, 1666, 76 ff. (−16 ff.), 11x25 cm, single column, (10x22 cm), 4 lines main text, 2–4 lines of interlinear commentary for each text line, in Jain Devanagari book script, filled with red and yellow, 17 paintings in colours mostly of Śvetāmbara Jain monks, influenced by the Mughal style. The text is a Prakrit didactic work of how best to live a proper Jain life, aimed probably at the laity. The Śvetāmbara pontiff, Sri Dharmadasagaî, lived in the mid-6th century. The Old Gujarati prose commentary was written in 1487. The colophon gives the place, date, and the name of the religious leader, Sri Nandalalaji, on whose order the work was transcribed.

Old Western Rājasthāni (also known as Maru-Gurjari, Old Gujarātī) is the common ancestor of the modern Gujarati and Western Rajasthani languages which developed from Sanskrit and the Prakrit Apabhraṃśas, and was spoken around 8-14th centuries in Western India. The literary form of Old Western Rājasthāni, the Dingala language was in use as early as the 12th century. While the spoken Old Western Rajasthani gave way to medieval forms of Western Rajasthani and Gujarati, it flourished in its literary form as Dingala till the 19th century.

Early texts of the language display characteristic features such as direct/oblique noun forms, postpositions, and auxiliary verbs. It had three genders, as Gujarati does today, and by about the 14th century, a fairly standardized form of this language emerged. The belief that modern Rajasthani sporadically expressed a neuter gender was based on the incorrect conclusion that the [ũ] that came to be pronounced in some areas for masculine [o] after a nasal consonant was analogous to Gujarati's neuter [ũ]. A formal grammar, Prakrita Vyakarana, of the precursor to this language, Gurjar Apabhraṃśa, was written by Jain monk and eminent scholar Acharya Hemachandra Suri in the reign of Chaulukya king Jayasimha Siddharaja of Anhilwara (Patan).

== Literature ==
Major works were written in various genres, for the most part in verse form, such as:

- rāsa, predominantly didactic narrative, of which the earliest known is Śālibhadrasūri's Bhārateśvarabāhubali (1185).
- phāgu, in which springtime is celebrated, of which the earliest is Jinapadmasūri's Sirithūlibadda (c. 1335). The most famous is the Vasantavilāsa, of unknown authorship, which is undeterminedly dated to somewhere in 14th or 15th century, or possibly earlier.
- bārmāsī, describing natural beauty during each of the twelve months.
- ākhyāna, in which sections are each in a single metre.

Narsinh Mehta (c. 1414–1480) is traditionally viewed as the father of modern Gujarati poetry. By virtue of its early age and good editing, an important prose work is the 14th-century commentary of Taruṇaprabha, the Ṣaḍāvaśyakabālabodhavr̥tti.
