= Samaldas Arts College =

College in Bhavnagar, India

- Former names: Samaldas College
- Established: January 1885; 141 years ago
- Founders: Takhtsinhji
- Academic affiliations: Maharaja Krishnakumarsinhji Bhavnagar University
- Location: Bhavnagar, Gujarat, India; 21.75678°N 72.14214°E
- Website: Official website

Samaldas Arts College or Samaldas College is a college in Bhavnagar, Gujarat, India. It was founded in 1885 by Takhtsinhji, the Maharaja of Bhavnagar State in memory of his Diwan (minister) Samaldas Paramananddas Mehta. It is one of the oldest colleges in western India. It is affiliated to Maharaja Krishnakumarsinhji Bhavnagar University.

== History ==
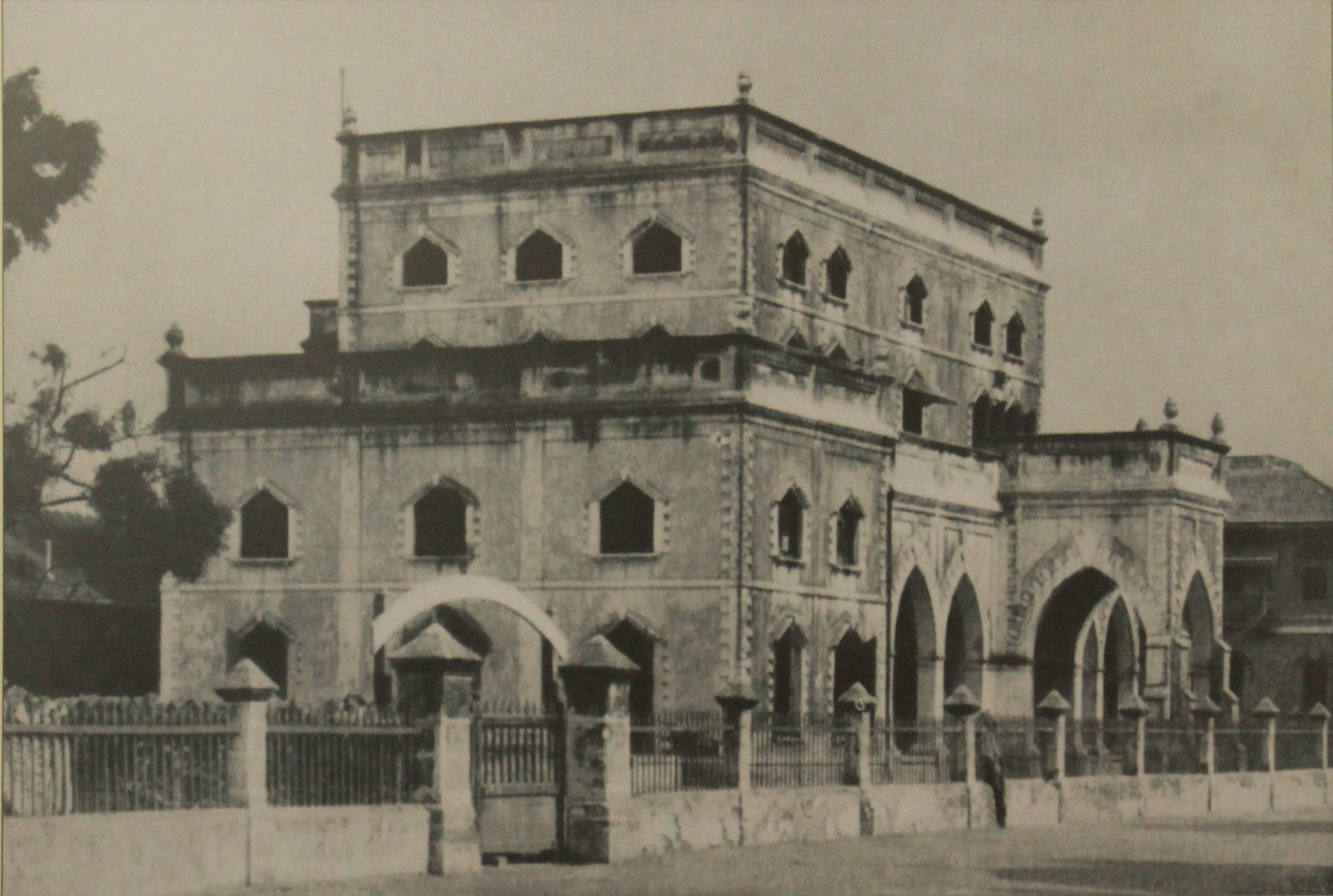
Majiraj Girls High School building from which Samaldas College operated from 1885 to 1893

Samaldas College was established by Takhtsinhji, the Maharaja of Bhavnagar State in memory of his Diwan Samaldas Paramananddas Mehta. The college was affiliated to University of Bombay and the classes were opened in January 1885 in Majiraj Girls High School building.

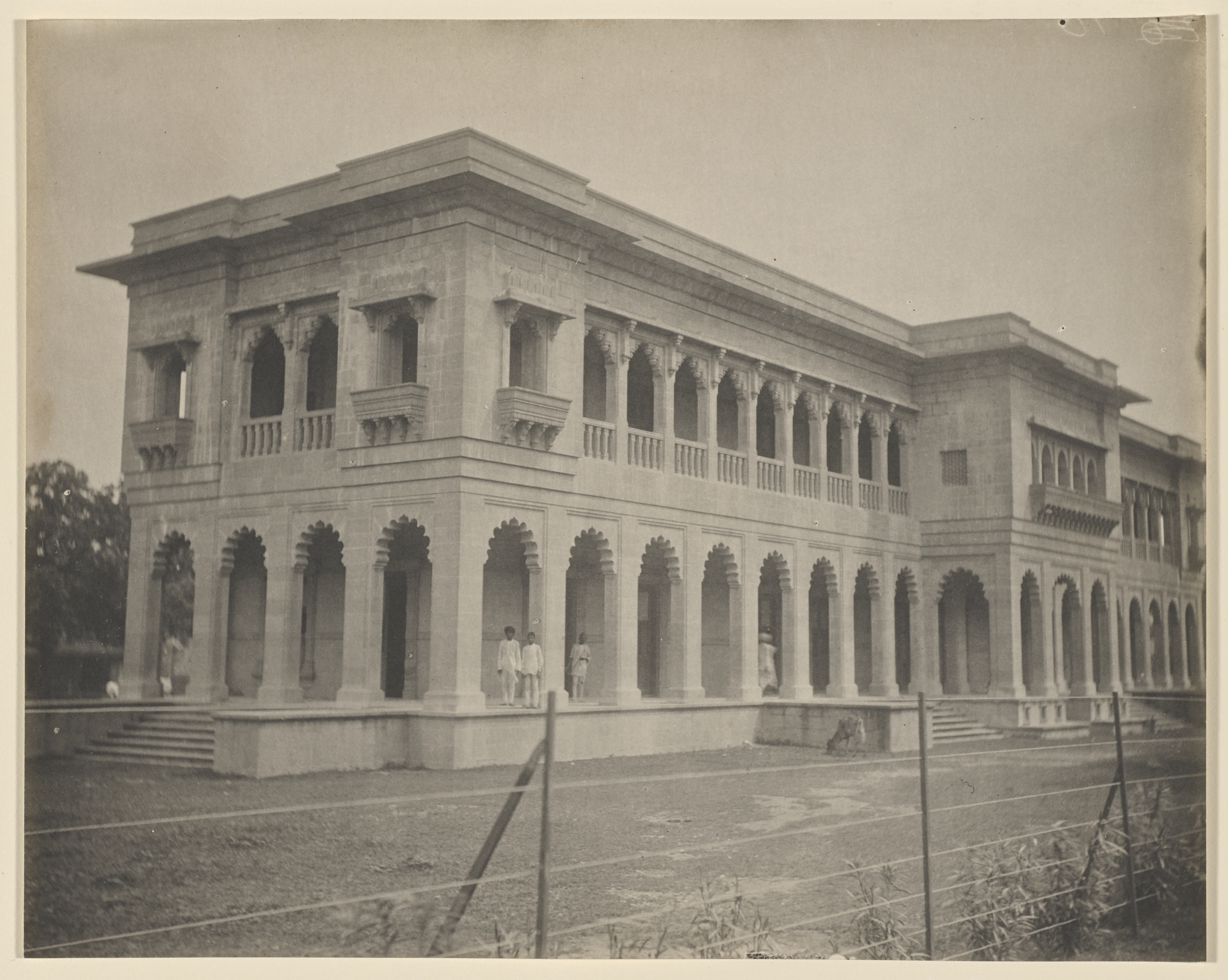
Shamaldas College building (1893-1932), now Sheth J. P. Ayurveda college

The foundation stone of the building opposite Peel Garden was laid on 25 November 1884 by James Furgusson, Governor of Bombay. The building was opened on 17 December 1886 by Lord Reay, Governor Bombay. The building was occupied in 1893. The building was constructed by R. Proctor Sims, the Public Works Councillor. The building is now used as the Sheth J. P. Ayurveda College.

In 1932, Krishnakumarsinhji, Maharaja of Bhavnagar, built a new building for the college on Vaghawadi Road. The building is used as the P. P. Institute of Science since June 1963.

On 1 November 1955, Jawaharlal Nehru, the first Prime Minister of India, laid the foundation of the present building of the college. The college is now affiliated to Maharaja Krishnakumarsinhji Bhavnagar University.

== Principals ==
The principal were as follows:

- R. H. Gunion (1885―1890)
- J. N. Unwalla (1890―1905)
- K. J. Sanjana (1905―1906)
- B. A. Enti (1906)
- K. J. Sanjana (1907―1923)
- T. K. Shahani (1923―1948)
- J. B. Sendil (1952―62)
- B. C. Desai (1962―66)
- S. M. Shah (1967―70)
- A. S. Prabhudesai (1975―77)
- A. A. Shaikh (1994―)

== Notable alumni ==
- Mahatma Gandhi (January 1888 ― June 1888), Indian independence leader
- Nautam Bhatt, physicist
- H. J. Kania, the first Chief Justice of India
- Anantrai Raval, critic and editor
- Yashwant Trivedi, poet, essayist and critic
- Harivallabh Bhayani, linguist, researcher, critic and translator
- Kundanika Kapadia, novelist, story writer, essayist
- Nanabhai Bhatt, educationist
- Amrutlal Yagnik, critic, biographer, essayist, editor and translator
- Sanat Mehta, politician and social activist
- Hardwar Goswami, poet, writer, and playwright
- Mansukhlal Jhaveri, poet, critic, and literary historian
- Harindra Dave, poet, journalist, playwright and novelist
- Krishnalal Jhaveri, writer, scholar, literary historian, translator, and judge
- Ramnarayan V. Pathak, poet, writer
- Lalsinh Raol, ornithologist, nature conservationist and writer

== Notable faculty ==
- Manilal Dwivedi, writer and philosopher
- Kantilal Vyas, linguist, critic and editor
