= Middle Gujarati =

Ancient form of Gujarati

- Era: Developed around 14th century and gave rise to Modern Gujarati by the 19th century
- Language family: Indo-European: Indo-Iranian; Indo-Aryan; Western; Gujarati languages; Middle Gujarati
- Early forms: Gurjar Apabhraṃśa: Old Gujarati

Language codes
- ISO 639-3: –
- Glottolog: None

Middle Gujarati refers to the stage of the Gujarati language spoken between 1300 AD and 1800. It split off from Old Western Rājasthāni, and developed the phonemes ɛ and ɔ, the auxiliary stem ch-, and the possessive marker -n-. Major phonological changes characteristic of the transition between Old and Middle Gujarati are:

- i, u develop to ə in open syllables
- diphthongs əi, əu change to ɛ and ɔ in initial syllables and to e and o elsewhere
- əũ develops to ɔ̃ in initial syllables and to ű in final syllables

These developments would have grammatical consequences. For example, Old Gujarati's instrumental-locative singular in -i was leveled and eliminated, having become the same as Old Gujarati's nominative/accusative singular in -ə.
