= Amrutlal Yagnik =

Amrutlal Bhagwanji Yagnik (8 August 1913 – 3 January 1991) was an Indian Gujarati critic, biographer, essayist, editor and translator.

== Life ==
Amrutlal was born on 8 August 1913 at Dhrangadhra. He completed his education until matriculation from Dhrangadhra. He completed B. A. in 1936 and Masters in Arts in 1939 in English and Gujarati from Samaldas College. He worked as a part-time lecturer in Ramnarayan Ruiya College from 1939 to 1940 and later as a full-time lecturer of Gujarati from 1940 to 1960. He also served as the founder principal of K. J. Somaiya College, Ghatkopar, Mumbai from 1960 to 1961. He later served as the principal of Mithibai College. He died on 3 January 1991.

== Works ==
His works are chiefly associated with education, literature and social culture. His critical writing is collected in Chidghosh (1971). Mukhad Kya Dekho Darpan Mein (1979) is work on education and society. He wrote short biographies of Kishorelal Mashruwala (1980) and Gulabdas Broker (1983) under Gujarati Granthkar Shreni.

Jagagangana Vehta Neer (1970), Atmagangotrina Punit Jal (1974), Jagine Joun To (1976), Samajgangana Vaheno (1981), Kutumbjeevanna Rekhachitro (1987) and Vidyasrishtina Pranganma (1987) are collections of essays on education, society and experiences.

Yagnik edited two works on literature; Loksahityanu Samalochan (1946) and Gujaratma Gandhiyug: Aitihasik and Sahityik Avlokan (1968). He also co-edited Kavyasushma (1959), Vangmayvihar (1964), Akshar Aradhna (1980) and Sahtyik Vada (1980).

Dhairyashiloni Veerkathao (1959), Shikshan ane Lokshahi (1964), Americani Sanskritini Rooprekha (1964), Kumaran Asan (1979) are his translations.

== See also ==
- List of Gujarati-language writers
