= Premanand Bhatt =

Gujarati Poet

Premanand Krushanram Bhatt (1636–1714), also known as Premanand, was a medieval Gujarati poet and Maanbhatt (professional story teller) known for his Akhyana compositions.

== Life ==
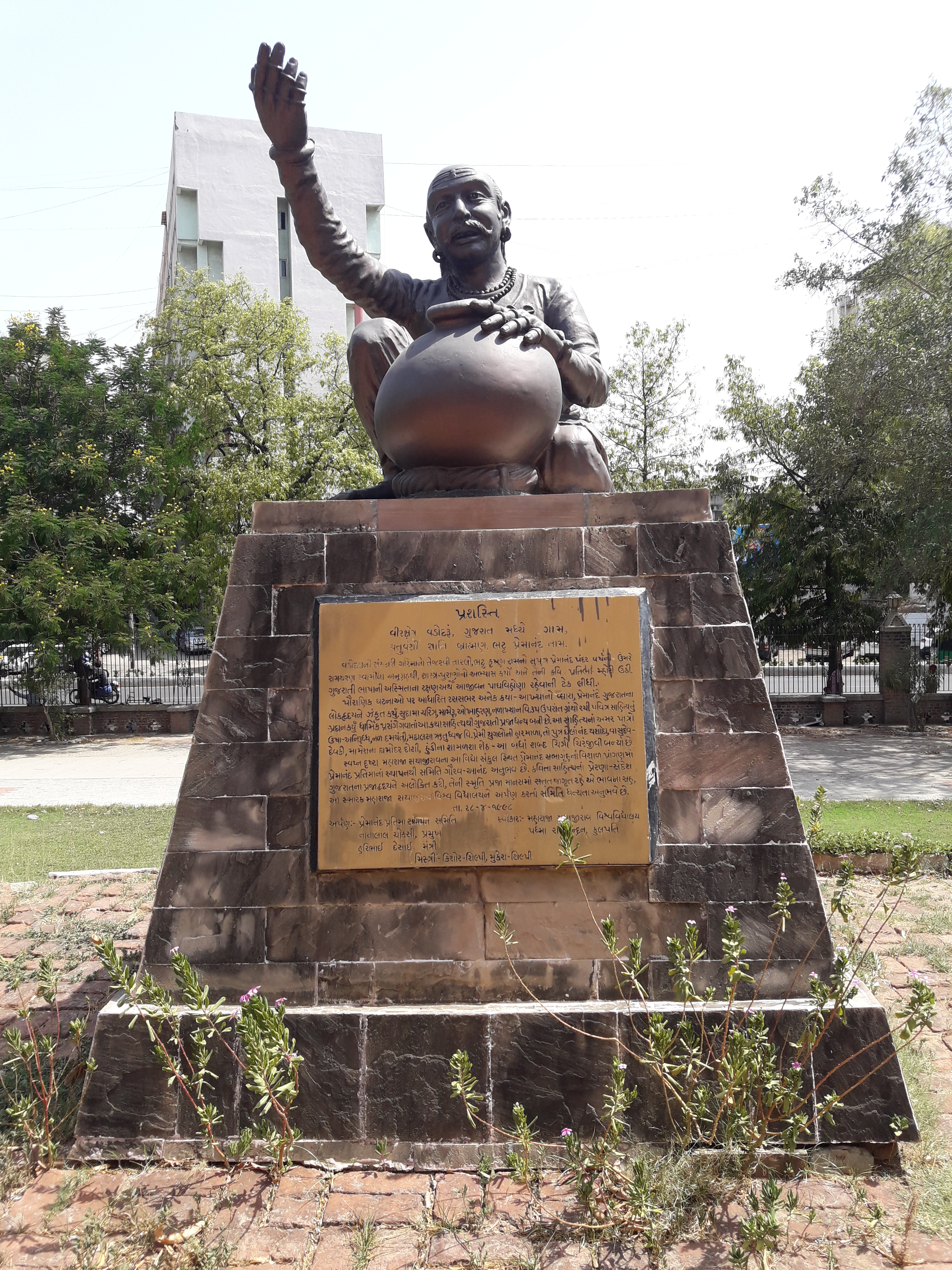
Statue of Premanand placed near Faculty of Arts in M. S. University, Vadodara

He was born in 1636 at Vadodara in the caste of the Nandora Chaturvanshi Brahmins. In colophons of his Akhyanas, he remarked such as, "Place of braves called Vadodara, Situated in the middle of Gujarat, caste Chaturvanshi Bramins, Bhatt Premanand is the name". In those times, Gujarat was ruled by Mughal governor Aurangzeb. At that time it was openly said:

"Marwari language is valued at 16 aanas (equiv. to 1 Rupee), Kachhi language is valued at 12 aanas; Marathi language is valued at 8 aanas, while Gujarati language is valued at 4 paise (equiv. to 1 aana)".

Born at the time when Gujarati language was devalued in such a manner, Premanand vowed that:

"I shall not put on a Turban on my head till the time I earn a respectable position for Gujarati Language".

By supposed divine inspiration, Premanand undertook the commendable but Herculean task of taking The Ramayan, Mahabharat, Bhagwat, Harivansh Puraan and life episodes of Devout-Poet Narsinh Mehta through "Maankala" (with the help of playing Maan) across numerous villages of Gujarat. Premanand provided invaluable service to Gujarati Language as well as to the people of society by poetically narrating the religious and social inheritance of Middle Ages, i.e. episodes from epics and scriptures in a simple and effective language and also performed valuable act of cultural awakening. Premanand's creations are priceless possessions of Gujarati literature; they are the cultural inheritance of Gujarati populace.

Renowned Gujarati Poet Narmad has noted that:

"Premanand's language is universally uniform. The depiction of customs, traditions and nature of people; and verbal depiction of incidents garnished with exaggerated descriptions have found their prominent place in the vernacular language. This is the beauty of Premanand's verses.

And the eminent Gujarati novelist Navalram has mentioned:

"It is not surprising that Premanand who hails from Vadodara, who has written poetry on pure and profound love and whose name has become so dear to those art-loving people who have experienced divine love and pleasure; enjoys the supreme position amongst the contemporary poets. I personally believe that it is his modesty and humbleness that he obliges the other three frontline poets by allowing them to sit near the steps of his artistic kingdom! Really! Gujarati people should be proud of Premanand".

Raskavi Premanand has structured his poetic verbal recitals as per time and incidences. For example, importance of "Okhaharan" (Abduction of girl named Okha) in the month of "Chaitra" (6th month of the Vikram year), the pleasure of listening to a detailed poetic depiction of the marriage of "Shamalsha" (son of Narsinh Mehta) in the month of "Vaishakh" (7th month of the Vikram year) which is the season for marriages, while in "Bhadarvo" (11th month of the Vikram year) – the month of making ceremonial offerings to the dead ancestors – he would present a poetic recital on the description of such offerings to the deceased father of Narsinh Mehta. He wrote Okhaharan.

== Contribution ==
He was known by the title of "Ras-Kavi". His known creations are "Nalakhyan", "Sudamacharitra", "Dashamskandh", "Rannyagna", Okhaharan, Kunvarbainu Mameru.

Name of Raskavi (Poet of sentiments) Premanand is on the top of the list of "Aakhyankars".
