= Phalashruti =

Meritorious verse in Hindu literature

A phalashruti (Sanskrit: फलश्रुति, romanized: phalaśruti) is a meritorious verse in Hindu literature, appearing at the end of a text or one of its constituent sections. Such a verse offers a description of the benefits that could be accrued by an adherent from the recitation or listening to a given text. It may also extol the prominence of a work, as well as provide the appropriate context for its perusal.

== Etymology ==
Phalaśruti is a Sanskrit compound word consisting of the words phala (lit. 'fruit') and śruti (lit. 'listening'), literally translating to, "fruits of listening".

== Literature ==
The phalashruti is featured in a number of genres of Hindu literature such as the Upanishads, the Brahmanas, the Puranas, and the Itihasas.

=== Bhagavata Purana ===
The phalashruti of the Bhagavata Purana states that he who gifts the text on a full moon in the month of Bhadrapada would achieve the highest goal after their death. The verse acclaims the greatness of the text among other texts of the Purana genre, stating it to be analogous to the river Ganga and the deity Vishnu in terms of its virtue.

=== Mahabharata ===
The phalashruti of the Mahabharata describes the benefits of success, progeny, good fortune, and victory to its listeners. It also describes the purification of the listener from sins, as well as allowing them to obtain heaven and become one with Brahman. A brief account of the composition of the text is also featured in the verse.

=== Ramayana ===
The phalashruti of the Ramayana describes the benefits of longevity, good fortune, and the destruction of all sins accrued by its listeners. It also states that offspring and wealth would be granted to its listeners, along with favourable prospects after their death. The time periods of noon and dusk are described in the verse to be auspicious for the recitation of the epic.

=== Shiva Purana ===
The phalashruti of the Shiva Purana describes the benefits of worldly pleasure, the destruction of sins, and liberation to its listeners. It encourages the work to be recited to the devotees of Shiva over others. It states that the repeated listening of the text leads to increased devotion, culminating in the achievement of salvation.

== See also ==
- Mangalacharana
