= Chimanlal Trivedi =

Indian Gujarati-language critic (1929–2015)

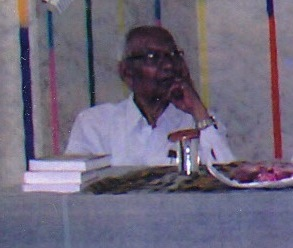
- Trivedi at Gujarati Sahitya Parishad
- Born: Chimanlal Shivshankar Trivedi; 2 June 1929 Mujpur, Gujarat, India
- Died: 30 January 2015 (aged 85)
- Occupation: Writer, literary critic, editor
- Language: Gujarati
- Notable awards: Ranjitram Suvarna Chandrak (2009)

Academic background
- Thesis: Kavi Nakar: Ek Adhyayan (Poet Nakar: A Study) (1960)
- Doctoral advisor: Kantilal Vyas

Chimanlal Shivshankar Trivedi (2 June 1929 – 30 January 2015) was a Gujarati critic and editor from Gujarat, India.

== Life ==
Chimanlal Trivedi was born on 2 June 1929 at Mujpur village (now in Patan district, Gujarat, India). He completed BA in 1950, MA in 1952 and PhD in 1961. He taught Gujarati at various colleges since 1951 including St. Xavier's College, Ahmedabad.

He died on 30 January 2015.

== Works ==
Pingal Darshan (1953) is an introductory work on metres. Urmikavya (1966) is a work on lyrical poetry, its form, development and types. His Ph.D. thesis Kavi Nakar - Ek Adhyayan (1966) is a study of medieval Gujarati poet Nakar and his published and unpublished works. The followups to this work are included in Nakar (1979) of Gujarati Granthkar series as well as in Gujarati Sahityano Itihas - Volume 2. Chosathnu Granthasth Vagmay (1972) is criticism of works of various genres. Bhavlok (1976) and Bhavmudra (1983) discuss poetry and works of well known and unknown poets of medieval and modern era. His essay Gujarati Chhandorachana in Bhavmudra investigates the use of metres in Gujarati literature.

He co-edited Apana Khandkavyo (1957), Sudamacharitra (1963), Kunwarbainu Mameru (1964), Abhimanyu Akhyan (1967), Virat Parva (1969), Kalelkar Granthavali (1981). He has also co-edited Gujarati Sahityano Itihas and Granth Ane Granthkar Part 11 (1966), both published by Gujarati Sahitya Parishad. He co-edited Madhya Yugin Urmikavyo (1998), a compilation of medieval Gujarati poems, with Chinu Modi.

== Awards ==
He was awarded Ranjitram Suvarna Chandrak in 2009.

== See also ==
- List of Gujarati-language writers
