= Fagu =

Genre of poetry

Fagu, also spelled Phagu, is a genre of poetry in Old Gujarati language popular during early period of Gujarati literature.

== Etymology ==
Fagu is derived from Sanskrit word Falgu. As an adjective, it means beautiful, handsome, fine, etc. As a noun, it became synonyms of the Spring season. Falguna (also spelled Phalguna), a spring season month according to Hindu calendar, is origin of this word.

== Form ==
Fagu is a lyrical form depicting beauty of nature during spring. It also portrays joys and pleasures of love, fears and hopes separation and union of lovers. This form was popular among Jain poets who were mostly monks, so many of these Fagu start with erotic sentiments and ends with renunciation or self restraints.

== History ==
An oldest known Fagu is Jinachandra Suri Fagu (about 1225) by Jinapadma Suri. It has 25 verses with 6 to 20 verses missing. The first complete Fagu is Sthulibhadra Fagu composed between 1234 and 1244 or in 1344 or 1334. It describes rainy season instead of spring. The separation of Rajula and Jain Tirthankara Neminatha was a popular theme among Jain poets. Some examples are Neminatha Fagu (1344) by Rajshekhar, Neminatha Fagu (1375) by Jayashekhar and Rangasagara Neminatha Fagu (1400) by Somsundar. A poem Neminatha Chatushpadika (1269) by Vinaychandra depicted the same story. There are twelve known Fagus of these period and majority of them are written by Jain monks. Only two Fagus, Vasanta Vilas Fagu and Narayana Fagu, written by unknown authors are of non-Jain poets. Vasanta Vilas Fagu written in the fourteenth century by unknown author is beautiful Fagu without any religious sentiments. Narayana Fagu (1441) is about Krishna.
