= Gurjara Apabhraṃśa =

Ancient language of North India

- गुर्जर अपभ्रंश
- Era: Developed into Old Gujarati by the 8th century
- Language family: Indo-European: Indo-Iranian; Indo-Aryan; Western; Gurjara Apabhraṃśa
- Early forms: Vedic Sanskrit: Classical Sanskrit; Shauraseni Prakrit
- Writing system: Devanagari

Language codes
- ISO 639-3: –
- Glottolog: None

The Gurjara Apabhraṃśa was one of the many Apabhraṃśas to descend from Shauraseni Prakrit. It was spoken in the Gurjaradesha region of western India, throughout the Chaulukya dynasty. A formal grammar of this language, Prakrita Vyakarana, was written by Jain monk and scholar Hemachandra in the reign of Chaulukya king Jayasimha Siddharaja of Anhilwara (Patan). Marugurjari descended from this language which is ancestral to modern Gujarati and Rajasthani languages.
