= Gujarati language =

Indo-Aryan language

Gujarati
- ગુજરાતી Gujarātī
- The word "Gujarātī" in Gujarati script
- Pronunciation: [ɡudʒəˈɾɑt̪i]
- Native to: India; Pakistan
- Region: Western India: Gujarat; Union-territories Dadra and Nagar Haveli and Daman and Diu
- Ethnicity: Gujaratis
- Speakers: L1: 57 million (2011 census); L2: 5.0 million (2011 census); Total: 62 million (2011)
- Language family: Indo-European: Indo-Iranian; Indo-Aryan; Western Indo-Aryan; Gujarati languages; Gujarati
- Early forms: Shauraseni Prakrit: Gurjar Apabhraṃśa; Old Gujarati; Middle Gujarati
- Standard forms: Standard Gujarati
- Dialects: Inner: Amdawadi Gujarati Old Standard Ahmedabad Standard Broach Nāgarī Bombay Suratī Saurashtra Anāvla or Bhāṭelā Pārsī Eastern Broach Carotarī Pāṭīdār Vaḍodarī Gāmaḍiā of Ahmedabad, Paṭanī Thar and Parkar Cutch Kāṭhiyāvāḍī Musalmān (Vhorāsī, Kharwā and Lisan ud-Dawat) Paṭṇulī, Kākarī, and Tārīmukī or Ghisāḍi Ghisadi Kharwa Kakari Tarimuki Kathiawari; Outer: East African Gujarati Mauritius Réunion
- Writing system: Gujarati script; Gujarati Braille

Official status
- Official language in: India; Gujarat; Dadra and Nagar Haveli and Daman and Diu
- Recognised minority language in: South Africa (protected language)
- Regulated by: Gujarat Sahitya Akademi, Government of Gujarat

Language codes
- ISO 639-1: gu
- ISO 639-2: guj
- ISO 639-3: guj
- Glottolog: guja1252
- Linguasphere: 59-AAF-h
- Map of the Gujarati language. Light red are regions with significant minorities, dark red a majority or plurality

Gujarati (Note: /ˌɡʊdʒəˈrɑːti/ GUUJ-ə-RAH-tee; Gujarati script: ગુજરાતી, romanised: Gujarātī, IPA: [ɡudʒəˈɾɑti]) is an Indo-European language of the Indo-Aryan branch native to the Indian state of Gujarat and spoken predominantly by the Gujarati people. Gujarati is descended from Old Gujarati (c. 1100–1500 CE). In India, it is the official language of the state of Gujarat, as well as one of the official languages of the union territory of Dadra and Nagar Haveli and Daman and Diu. Gujarati is also one of the 22 scheduled languages of India. As of 2011, Gujarati is the 6th most widely spoken language in India by number of native speakers, spoken by 55.5 million speakers which amounts to about 4.5% of the total Indian population. It is the 26th most widely spoken language in the world by number of native speakers as of 2007.

Gujarati, along with Meitei (alias Manipuri), hold the third place among the fastest growing languages of India, following Hindi (first place) and Kashmiri language (second place), according to the 2011 census of India.

Outside of Gujarat, Gujarati is spoken in many other parts of South Asia by Gujarati migrants, especially in Mumbai and Pakistan (mainly in Karachi). Gujarati is also widely spoken in many countries outside South Asia by the Gujarati diaspora. In North America, Gujarati is one of the fastest-growing and most widely spoken Indian languages in the United States (especially in New Jersey and New York City) and Canada. In Europe, Gujaratis form the second largest of the British South Asian speech communities, and Gujarati is the fourth most commonly spoken language in the UK's capital, of London. Gujarati is also spoken in Southeast Africa, particularly in Kenya, Tanzania, Uganda, Zambia, and South Africa. Elsewhere, Gujarati is spoken to a lesser extent in Hong Kong, Singapore, Australia, and Middle Eastern countries such as Bahrain, and the United Arab Emirates.

== History ==
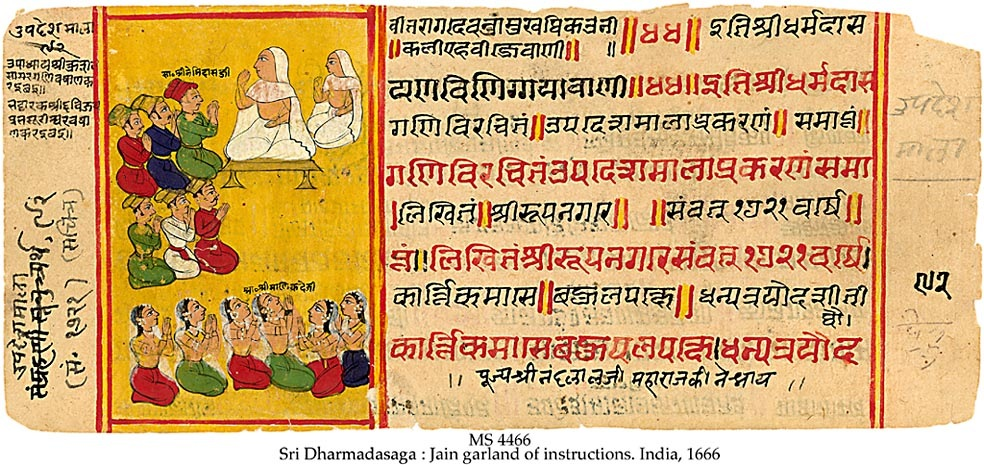
1666 manuscript of a 6th-century Jain Prakrit text with a 1487 commentary in Old Gujarati

Gujarati (sometimes spelled Gujerati, Gujarathi, Guzratee, Guujaratee, Gujrathi, and Gujerathi) is a modern Indo-Aryan (IA) language evolved from Sanskrit. The traditional practice is to differentiate the IA languages on the basis of three historical stages:

1. Old IA (Vedic and Classical Sanskrit)
2. Middle IA (various Prakrits and Apabhramshas)
3. New IA (modern languages such as Hindi, Punjabi, Bengali, etc.)

Another view postulates successive family tree splits, in which Gujarati is assumed to have separated from other IA languages in four stages:

1. IA languages split into Northern, Eastern, and Western divisions based on the innovate characteristics such as plosives becoming voiced in the Northern (Skt. danta "tooth" > Punj. dānd) and dental and retroflex sibilants merging with the palatal in the Eastern (Skt. sandhya "evening" > Beng. śājh).
2. Western, into Central and Southern.
3. Central, in Gujarati/Rajasthani, Western Hindi, and Punjabi/Lahanda/Sindhi, on the basis of innovation of auxiliary verbs and postpositions in Gujarati/Rajasthani.
4. Gujarati/Rajasthani into Gujarati and Rajasthani through development of such characteristics as auxiliary ch- and the possessive marker -n- during the 15th century.

The principal changes from the Middle Indo-Aryan stage are the following:

=== Phonological changes ===
==== Changes in common with other New Indo-Aryan languages ====
- Reduction of geminates to single consonants with lengthening of previous vowel (sometimes with spontaneous nasalisation) (#NIA-1/2)
- Loss of final vowels (#NIA-3)
- Lengthening of vowel in -VNC- sequences and consequent nasalisation (#NIA-4)
- Loss of unaccented vowels in non-final positions common (#NIA-5)
- Vowels in direct succession coalesce into long vowels or form diphthongs (#NIA-6)
  - Coalescence of vowels of like quality (#NIA-6a)
  - With unlike vowels, the first vowel is generally dominant (#NIA-6b)
  - aï and aü eventually become ε and ɔ (#NIA-6b-3)
- Retroflextion of lateral approximant: -l- > -ḷ- (#SD-1c)
- Exception to #NIA-1 when a long vowel follows the geminate and the word is longer than two syllables (#SD-2)

| Middle Indo-Aryan | Gujarati | English | Rule | Ref |
|---|---|---|---|---|
| hattha | hāth | hand | #NIA1 | |
| aṭṭha | āṭh | eight | #NIA1 | |
| akkhi | ā̃kh | eye | #NIA2 | |
| jibbhā | jībh | tongue | #NIA3 | |
| gaṇṭhi | gā̃ṭh | knot | #NIA4 | |
| cittaāra | citāro | painter | #NIA-6a | |
| *khava | kho- | lose | #NIA-6a | |
| ghia | ghī | ghee | #NIA-6b | |
| caükkiā | cɔk | courtyard, square | #NIA-6b-3 | |
| phala | phaḷ | fruit | #SD-1c | |
| kappūra | kapūr | camphor | #SD-2 | |

=== Morphology and Syntax ===
- Morphological
  - Reduction in the number of compounds
  - Merger of the dual with plural
  - Replacement of case affixes by postpositions
  - Development of periphrastic tense/voice/mood constructions
- Syntax
  - Split ergativity
  - More complex agreement system

Gujarati is then customarily divided into the following three historical stages:

=== Old Gujarati ===
Old Gujarātī (જૂની ગુજરાતી; 1200 CE–1500 CE), which descended from Prakrit and the ancestor of modern Gujarati and Rajasthani, was spoken by the Gujjars, who were residing and ruling in Gujarat, Punjab, Rajputana, and central India. The language was used as a literary language as early as the 12th century. Texts of this era display characteristic Gujarati features, such as direct/oblique noun forms, postpositions, and auxiliary verbs. It had three genders, as Gujarati does today, and by around the time of 1300 CE, a fairly standardised form of this language emerged. While generally known as Old Gujarati, some scholars prefer the name Old Western Rajasthani, based upon the argument that Gujarati and Rajasthani were not yet distinct. Factoring into this preference was the belief that modern Rajasthani sporadically expressed a neuter gender, based on the incorrect conclusion that the [ũ] that came to be pronounced in some areas for masculine [o] after a nasal consonant was analogous to Gujarati's neuter [ũ]. A formal grammar, Prakrita Vyakarana, of the precursor to this language, Gurjar Apabhraṃśa, was written by the Jain monk and eminent scholar Acharya Hemachandra Suri, in the reign of Chaulukya king Jayasimha Siddharaja of Anhilwara (Patan).

=== Middle Gujarati ===
Middle Gujarati (AD 1500–1800) split off from Rajasthani, and developed the phonemes ɛ and ɔ, the auxiliary stem ch-, and the possessive marker -n-. Major phonological changes characteristic of the transition between Old and Middle Gujarati are:

- i, u develop to ə in open syllables
- diphthongs əi, əu change to ɛ and ɔ in initial syllables and to e and o elsewhere
- əũ develops to ɔ̃ in initial syllables and to ű in final syllables

These developments would have grammatical consequences. For example, Old Gujarati's instrumental-locative singular in -i was levelled and eliminated, having become the same as Old Gujarati's nominative/accusative singular in -ə.

=== Modern Gujarati (1800–present) ===
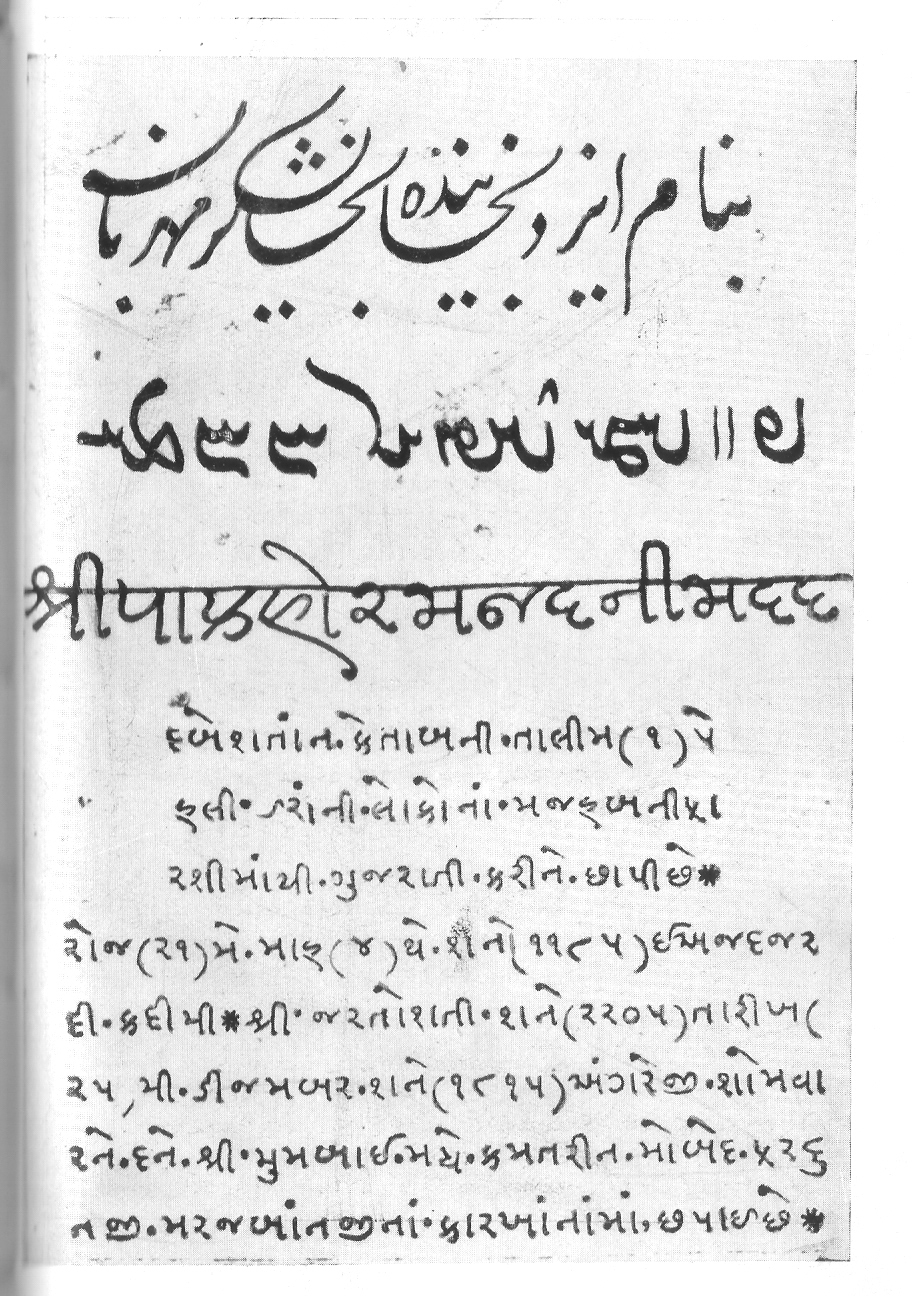
A page from the Gujarati translation of Dabestan-e Mazaheb prepared and printed by Fardunjee Marzban (25 December 1815)

A major phonological change was the deletion of final ə, such that the modern language has consonant-final words. Grammatically, a new plural marker of -o developed. In literature, the third quarter of the 19th century saw a series of milestones for Gujarati, which previously had verse as its dominant mode of literary composition. In the 1920s, the efforts to standardise Gujarati were carried out.

== Demographics and distribution ==
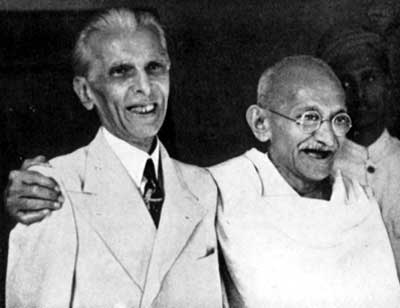
Muhammad Ali Jinnah and Mahatma Gandhi were both native Gujarati speakers but the former advocated for the use of Urdu.

Of the approximately 62 million speakers of Gujarati in 2022, roughly 60 million resided in India, 250,000 in Tanzania, 210,000 in Kenya, and some thousands in Pakistan. Many Gujarati speakers in Pakistan are shifting to Urdu; however, some Gujarati community leaders in Pakistan claim that there are 3 million Gujarati speakers in Karachi.

Mahatma Gandhi used Gujarati to serve as a medium of literary expression. He helped to inspire a renewal in its literature, and in 1936 he introduced the current spelling convention at the Gujarati Literary Society's 12th meeting.

Some Indo-Mauritians and many Réunion islanders are of Gujarati descent and some of them still speak Gujarati.

A considerable Gujarati-speaking population exists in North America, especially in the New York City Metropolitan Area and in the Greater Toronto Area, which have over 100,000 speakers and over 75,000 speakers, respectively, but also throughout the major metropolitan areas of the United States and Canada. According to the 2016 census, Gujarati is the fourth most-spoken South Asian language in Toronto after Hindustani, Punjabi and Tamil.

The UK has over 200,000 speakers, many of them situated in the London area, especially in North West London (in Harrow and Wembley), but also in Birmingham, Manchester, and in Leicester, Coventry, Rugby, Bradford and the former mill towns within Lancashire. A portion of these numbers consists of East African Gujaratis who, under increasing discrimination and policies of Africanisation in their newly independent resident countries (especially Uganda, where Idi Amin expelled 50,000 Asians), were left with uncertain futures and citizenships. Most, with British passports, settled in the UK. Gujarati is offered as a GCSE subject for students in the UK.

Some Gujarati parents in the diaspora are not comfortable with the possibility that their children will not be fluent in the language. In a study, 80% of Malayali parents felt that "Children would be better off with English", compared to 36% of Kannada parents and only 19% of Gujarati parents.

Besides being spoken by the Gujarati people, many non-Gujarati residents of Gujarat also speak it, among them the Kutchis (as a literary language) and the Parsis (adopted as a mother tongue).

=== Official status ===
Gujarati is one of the twenty-two official languages. It is the official language of the state of Gujarat and the union territory of Dadra and Nagar Haveli and Daman and Diu.

Gujarati is recognised and taught as a minority language in the states of Rajasthan, Madhya Pradesh, Maharashtra, and Tamil Nadu and the union territory of Delhi.

== Dialects ==
According to British historian and philologist William Tisdall, who was an early scholar of Gujarati grammar, three major varieties of Gujarati exist: a standard 'Hindu' dialect, a 'Parsi' dialect and a 'Muslim' dialect.

However, Gujarati has undergone contemporary reclassification with respect to the widespread regional differences in vocabulary and phrasing; notwithstanding the number of poorly attested dialects and regional variations in naming.

- Standard Gujarati: this forms something of a standardised variant of Gujarati across news, education and government. It is also spoken in pockets of Maharashtra. The varieties of it include Mumbai Gujarati, Nagari.
- Saurashtra: spoken primarily by the Saurashtrians who migrated from the Lata region of present-day Gujarat to Southern India in the Middle Ages. Saurashtra is closely related to Gujarati and the older dialects of Rajasthani and Sindhi. The script of this language is derived from the Devanagari script and shares similarities with modern-day Gujarati.
- Amdawadi Gujarati: spoken primarily in Ahmedabad and the surrounding regions, in addition to Bharuch and Surat, where it is colloquially known as 'Surati'. The varieties of it include Ahmedabad Gamadia, Anawla, Brathela, Charotari, Eastern Broach Gujarati, Gramya, Patani, Patidari, Surati, Vadodari.
- Kathiawari: a distinctive variant spoken primarily in the Kathiawar region and subject to significant Sindhi influence. The varieties of it include Bhavnagari, Gohilwadi, Holadi/Halari, Jhalawadi, Sorathi.

Kharwa, Kakari and Tarimuki (Ghisadi) are also often cited as additional varieties of Gujarati.

- Parsi: spoken by the Zoroastrian Parsi minority. This highly distinctive variety has been subject to considerable lexical influence by Avestan, the liturgical Zoroastrian language.
- Lisan ud-Dawat: spoken primarily by Gujarati Muslim Bohra communities, it has been subject to greater lexical influence by Arabic and Persian and is written in the Arabic script.

Kutchi is often referred to as a dialect of Gujarati, but most linguists consider it closer to Sindhi. In addition, the Memoni is related to Gujarati, albeit distantly.

Furthermore, words used by the native languages of areas where the Gujarati people have become a diaspora community, such as East Africa (Swahili), have become loanwords in local dialects of Gujarati.

The Linguistic Survey of India noted nearly two dozen dialects of Gujarati: Standard, Old, Standard Ahmedabad, Standard Broach, Nāgarī, Bombay, Suratī, Anāvla or Bhāṭelā, Eastern Broach, Pārsī, Carotarī, Pāṭīdārī, Vaḍodarī, Gāmaḍiā of Ahmedabad, Paṭanī, Thar and Parkar, Cutch, Kāṭhiyāvāḍī, Musalmān (Vhorāsī and Kharwā), Paṭṇulī, Kākarī, and Tārīmukī or Ghisāḍī. A manuscript containing Judeo-Gujarati, Gujarati written in Hebrew characters, by Rahamim Jacob Kohen is preserved in the Alalay microfilms of the British Library's Asia, Pacific and Africa Collections.

== Phonology ==
=== Vowels ===
| | Front | Central | Back |
|---|---|---|---|
| Close | i | | u |
| Close-mid | e | ə | o |
| Open-mid | ɛ | ə | ɔ |
| Open | (æ) | ɑ | |

=== Consonants ===
Consonants
| | | Labial | Dental/ Alveolar | Retroflex | Post-alv./ Palatal | Velar | Glottal |
|---|---|---|---|---|---|---|---|
| Nasal | | m | n | ɳ | ɲ | ŋ | |
| Stop/ Affricate | voiceless | p | t | ʈ | tʃ | k | |
| Stop/ Affricate | voiced | b | d | ɖ | dʒ | ɡ | |
| Stop/ Affricate | aspirated | pʰ | tʰ | ʈʰ | tʃʰ | kʰ | |
| Stop/ Affricate | murmured | bʱ | dʱ | ɖʱ | dʒʱ | ɡʱ | |
| Fricative | voiceless | (f) | s | ʂ | ʃ | | |
| Fricative | voiced | | (z) | | | | ɦ |
| Approximant | | ʋ | l | ɭ | j | | |
| Flap | | | ɾ | ɽ, ɽʱ | | | |

== Writing system ==
Similar to other Nāgarī writing systems, the Gujarati script is an abugida. It is used to write the Gujarati and Kutchi languages. It is a variant of the Devanāgarī script, differentiated by the loss of the characteristic horizontal line running above the letters and by a small number of modifications in the remaining characters.

The Gujarati alphabet, called Kakko, has between 47 and 48 letters. Many letters of the Kakko highlight the utilization of breath when speaking. For instance, the pronunciation of ક (ka) versus ખ (kha) relies on the placing an emphasis on "kh" for the latter letter.

== Vocabulary ==
=== Categorisation and sources ===
These are the three general categories of words in modern Indo-Aryan: tadbhav, tatsam, and loanwords.

==== Tadbhav ====
તદ્ભવ tadbhava, "of the nature of that". Gujarati is a modern Indo-Aryan language descended from Sanskrit (old Indo-Aryan), and this category pertains exactly to that: words of Sanskritic origin that have demonstratively undergone change over the ages, ending up characteristic of modern Indo-Aryan languages specifically as well as in general. Thus the "that" in "of the nature of that" refers to Sanskrit. They tend to be non-technical, everyday, crucial words; part of the spoken vernacular. Below is a table of a few Gujarati tadbhav words and their Old Indo-Aryan sources:

| Old Indo-Aryan | | Gujarati | | Ref |
|---|---|---|---|---|
| I | ahám | hũ | | |
| falls, slips | khasati | khasvũ | to move | |
| causes to move | arpáyati | āpvũ | to give | |
| attains to, obtains | prāpnoti | pāmvũ | | |
| tiger | vyāghrá | vāgh | | |
| equal, alike, level | samá | samũ | right, sound | |
| all | sárva | sau/sāv | | |

==== Tatsam ====
તત્સમ tatsama, "same as that". While Sanskrit eventually stopped being spoken vernacularly, in that it changed into Middle Indo-Aryan, it was nonetheless standardised and retained as a literary and liturgical language for long after. This category consists of these borrowed words of (more or less) pure Sanskrit character. They serve to enrich Gujarati and modern Indo-Aryan in its formal, technical, and religious vocabulary. They are recognisable by their Sanskrit inflections and markings; they are thus often treated as a separate grammatical category unto themselves.

| Tatsam | English | Gujarati |
|---|---|---|
| lekhak | writer | lakhnār |
| vijetā | winner | jītnār |
| vikǎsit | developed | vikǎselũ |
| jāgǎraṇ | awakening | jāgvānũ |

Many old tatsam words have changed their meanings or have had their meanings adopted for modern times. પ્રસારણ prasāraṇ means "spreading", but now it is used for "broadcasting". In addition to this are neologisms, often being calques. An example is telephone, which is Greek for "far talk", translated as દુરભાષ durbhāṣ. Most people, though, just use ફોન phon and thus neo-Sanskrit has varying degrees of acceptance.

So, while having unique tadbhav sets, modern IA languages have a common, higher tatsam pool. Also, tatsams and their derived tadbhavs can also co-exist in a language; sometimes of no consequence and at other times with differences in meaning:

| Tatsam | | Tadbhav | |
|---|---|---|---|
| karma | Work—Dharmic religious concept of works or deeds whose divine consequences are experienced in this life or the next. | kām | work [without any religious connotations]. |
| kṣetra | Field—Abstract sense, such as a field of knowledge or activity; khāngī kṣetra → private sector. Physical sense, but of higher or special importance; raṇǎkṣetra → battlefield. | khetar | field [in agricultural sense]. |

What remains are words of foreign origin (videśī), as well as words of local origin that cannot be pegged as belonging to any of the three prior categories (deśaj). The former consists mainly of Persian, Arabic, and English, with trace elements of Portuguese and Turkish. While the phenomenon of English loanwords is relatively new, Perso-Arabic has a longer history behind it. Both English and Perso-Arabic influences are quite nationwide phenomena, in a way paralleling tatsam as a common vocabulary set or bank. What's more is how, beyond a transposition into general Indo-Aryan, the Perso-Arabic set has also been assimilated in a manner characteristic and relevant to the specific Indo-Aryan language it is being used in, bringing to mind tadbhav.

==== Perso-Arabic ====
India was ruled for many centuries by Persian-speaking Muslims, amongst the most notable being the Delhi Sultanate, and the Mughal dynasty. As a consequence Indian languages were changed greatly, with the large scale entry of Persian and its many Arabic loans into the Gujarati lexicon. One fundamental adoption was Persian's conjunction "that", ke. Also, while tatsam or Sanskrit is etymologically continuous to Gujarati, it is essentially of a differing grammar (or language), and that in comparison while Perso-Arabic is etymologically foreign, it has been in certain instances and to varying degrees grammatically indigenised. Owing to centuries of situation and the end of Persian education and power, (1) Perso-Arabic loans are quite unlikely to be thought of or known as loans, and (2) more importantly, these loans have often been Gujarati-ized. dāvo – claim, fāydo – benefit, natījo – result, and hamlo – attack, all carry Gujarati's masculine gender marker, o. khānũ – compartment, has the neuter ũ. Aside from easy slotting with the auxiliary karvũ, a few words have made a complete transition of verbification: kabūlvũ – to admit (fault), kharīdvũ – to buy, kharǎcvũ – to spend (money), gujarvũ – to pass. The last three are definite part and parcel.

Below is a table displaying a number of these loans. Currently some of the etymologies are being referenced to an Urdu dictionary so that Gujarati's singular masculine o corresponds to Urdu ā, neuter ũ groups into ā as Urdu has no neuter gender, and Urdu's Persian z is not upheld in Gujarati and corresponds to j or jh. In contrast to modern Persian, the pronunciation of these loans into Gujarati and other Indo-Aryan languages, as well as that of Indian-recited Persian, seems to be in line with Persian spoken in Afghanistan and Central Asia, perhaps 500 years ago.

| Nouns | | | | | | | | | Adjectives | | |
| m | | | n | | | f | | | Adjectives | | |
|---|---|---|---|---|---|---|---|---|---|---|---|
| fāydo | gain, advantage, benefit | A | khānũ | compartment | P | kharīdī | purchase(s), shopping | P | tājũ | fresh | P |
| humlo | attack | A | makān | house, building | A | śardī | common cold | P | judũ | different, separate | P |
| dāvo | claim | A | nasīb | luck | A | bāju | side | P | najīk | near | P |
| natījo | result | A | śaher | city | P | cījh | thing | P | kharāb | bad | A |
| gusso | anger | P | medān | plain | P | jindgī | life | P | lāl | red | P |

Lastly, Persian, being part of the Indo-Iranian language family as Sanskrit and Gujarati are, met up in some instances with its cognates:

| Persian | Indo-Aryan | English |
|---|---|---|
| marăd | martya | man, mortal |
| stān | sthān | place, land |
| ī | īya | (adjectival suffix) |
| band | bandh | closed, fastened |
| shamsheri | aarkshak | policeman |

Zoroastrian Persian refugees known as Parsis also speak an accordingly Persianized form of Gujarati.

Loan words in Gujarati
| Gujarati | Source language |

==== English ====
With the end of Perso-Arabic inflow, English became the current foreign source of new vocabulary. English had and continues to have a considerable influence over Indian languages. Loanwords include new innovations and concepts, first introduced directly through British colonial rule, and then streaming in on the basis of continued Anglophone dominance in the Republic of India. Besides the category of new ideas is the category of English words that already have Gujarati counterparts which end up replaced or existed alongside with. The major driving force behind this latter category has to be the continuing role of English in modern India as a language of education, prestige, and mobility. In this way, Indian speech can be sprinkled with English words and expressions, even switches to whole sentences. See Hinglish, Code-switching.

In matters of sound, English alveolar consonants map as retroflexes rather than dentals. Two new characters were created in Gujarati to represent English /æ/'s and /ɔ/'s. Levels of Gujarati-ization in sound vary. Some words do not go far beyond this basic transpositional rule, and sound much like their English source, while others differ in ways, one of those ways being the carrying of dentals. See Indian English.

As English loanwords are a relatively new phenomenon, they adhere to English grammar, as tatsam words adhere to Sanskrit. That is not to say that the most basic changes have been underway: many English words are pluralised with Gujarati o over English "s". Also, with Gujarati having three genders, genderless English words must take one. Though often inexplicable, gender assignment may follow the same basis as it is expressed in Gujarati: vowel type, and the nature of word meaning.

==== Portuguese ====
The smaller foothold the Portuguese had in wider India had linguistic effects. Gujarati took up a number of words, while elsewhere the influence was great enough to the extent that creole languages came to be (see Portuguese India, Portuguese-based creole languages in India and Sri Lanka). Comparatively, the impact of Portuguese has been greater on coastal languages and their loans tend to be closer to the Portuguese originals. The source dialect of these loans imparts an earlier pronunciation of ch as an affricate instead of the current standard of [ʃ].

=== Loans into English ===
Bungalow—

1676, from Gujarati bangalo, from Hindi bangla "low, thatched house," lit. "Bengalese," used elliptically for "house in the Bengal style."

Coolie—

1598, "name given by Europeans to hired laborers in India and China," from Hindi quli "hired servant," probably from koli, name of an aboriginal tribe or caste in Gujarat.

Tank—

c.1616, "pool or lake for irrigation or drinking water," a word originally brought by the Portuguese from India, ult. from Gujarati tankh "cistern, underground reservoir for water," Marathi tanken, or tanka "reservoir of water, tank." Perhaps from Skt. tadaga-m "pond, lake pool," and reinforced in later sense of "large artificial container for liquid" (1690) by Port. tanque "reservoir," from estancar "hold back a current of water," from V.L. *stanticare (see stanch). But others say the Port. word is the source of the Indian ones.

== Grammar ==
Gujarati is a head-final, or left-branching language. Adjectives precede nouns, direct objects come before verbs, and there are postpositions. The word order of Gujarati is SOV, and there are three genders and two numbers. There are no definite or indefinite articles. A verb is expressed with its verbal root followed by suffixes marking aspect and agreement in what is called a main form, with a possible proceeding auxiliary form derived from to be, marking tense and mood, and also showing agreement. Causatives (up to double) and passives have a morphological basis.

== Sample text ==
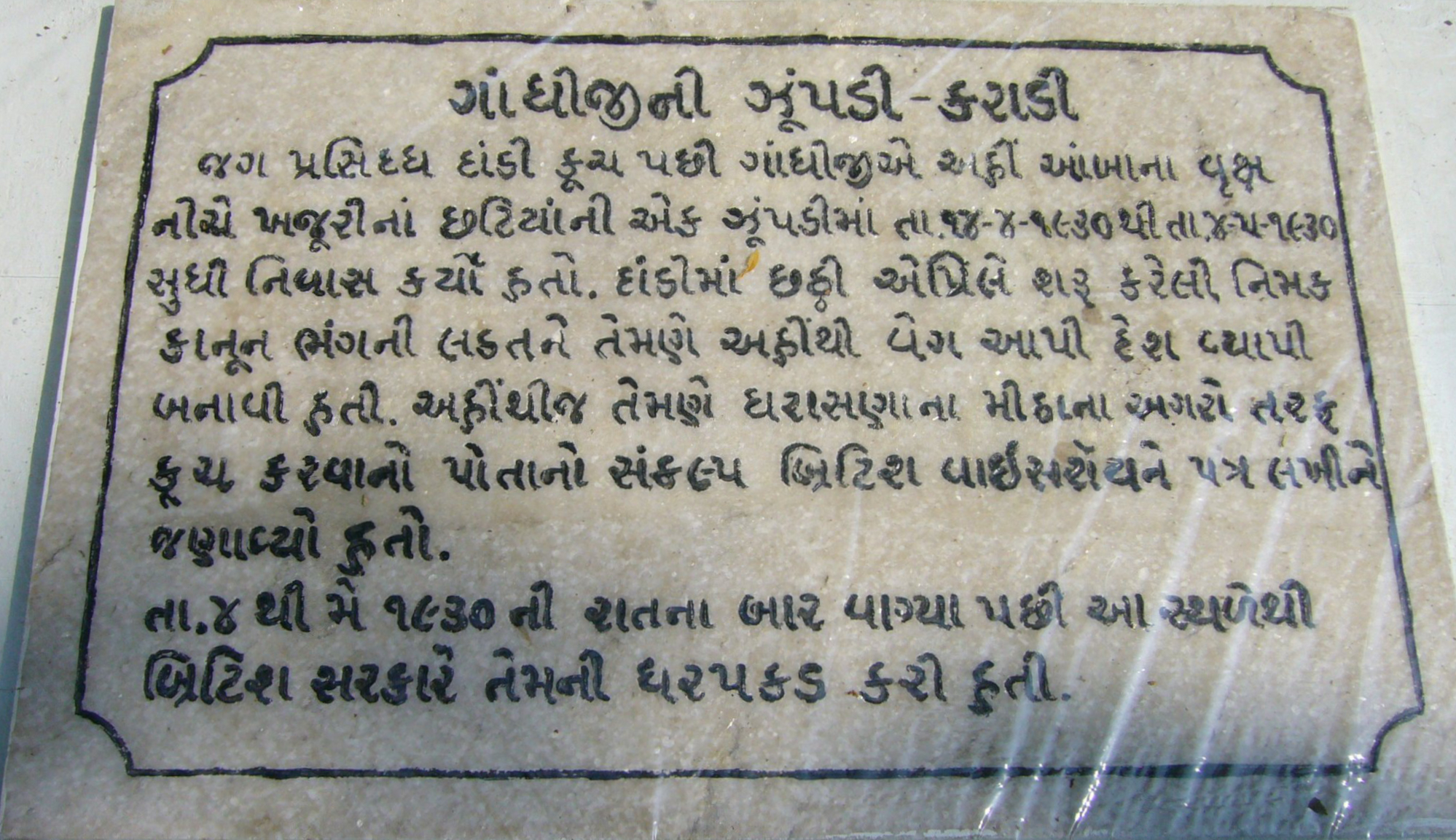
Gujarati sample (Sign about Gandhi's hut)

Gujarati script—

ગાંધીજીની ઝૂંપડી-કરાડી

જગ પ્રસિદ્ધ દાંડી કૂચ પછી ગાંધીજીએ અહીં આંબાના વૃક્ષ નીચે ખજૂરી નાં છટિયાંની એક ઝૂંપડીમાં તા.૧૪-૪-૧૯૩૦ થી તા.૪-૫-૧૯૩૦ સુધી નિવાસ કર્યો હતો. દાંડીમાં છઠ્ઠી એપ્રિલે શરૂ કરેલી નિમક કાનૂન (મીઠાના સત્યાગ્રહ) ભંગની લડતને તેમણે અહીંથી વેગ આપી દેશ વ્યાપી બનાવી હતી. અહીંથી જ તેમણે ધરાસણાના મીઠાના અગરો તરફ કૂચ કરવાનો પોતાનો સંકલ્પ બ્રિટિશ વાઈસરૉયને પત્ર લખીને જણાવ્યો હતો.

તા.૪ થી મે ૧૯૩૦ની રાતના બાર વાગ્યા પછી આ સ્થળેથી બ્રિટિશ સરકારે તેમની ધરપકડ કરી હતી.

Transliteration (IAST)—

gāndhījīnī jhūmpḍī-karāḍī

jag prasiddh dāṇḍī kūc pachī gāndhījīe ahī̃ āmbānā vrukṣ nīce khajūrī nā̃ chaṭiyānnī ek jhūmpḍīmā̃ tā.14-4-1930 thī tā.4-5-1930 sudhī nivās karyo hato. dāṇḍīmā̃ chaṭhṭhī eprile śarū karelī nimak kānūn (mīṭhānā satyāgraha) bhaṅgnī laḍatne temṇe ahīnthī veg āpī deś vyāpī banāvī hatī. ahīnthī ja temṇe dharāsṇānā mīṭhānā agro taraph kūc karvāno potāno saṅkalp briṭiś vāīsarôyane patra lakhīne jaṇāvyo hato.

tā.4thī me 1930nī rātnā bār vāgyā pachī ā sthaḷethī briṭiś sarkāre temnī dharapkaḍ karī hatī.

Transcription (IPA)—

[ɡɑndʱid͡ʒini d͡ʒʱũpɽi-kəɾɑɽi]

[d͡ʒəɡ pɾəsɪddʱ ɖɑɳɖi kut͡ʃ pət͡ʃʰi ɡɑndʱid͡ʒie ə̤ȷ̃ ɑmbɑnɑ ʋɾʊkʃ nit͡ʃe kʰəd͡ʒuɾnɑ̃ t͡ʃʰəʈijɑ̃ni ek d͡ʒʱũpɽimɑ̃ tɑ _________tʰi tɑ|| _______ sudʱi niʋɑs kəɾjoto|| ɖɑɳɖimɑ̃ t͡ʃʰəʈʰʈʰi epɾile ʃəɾu kəɾeli nimək kɑnun bʱəŋɡni ləɽətne tɛmɳe ə̤ȷ̃tʰi ʋeɡ ɑpi deʃ ʋjɑpi bənɑʋiti|| ə̤ȷ̃tʰid͡ʒ tɛmɳe dʱəɾɑsəɽ̃ɑnɑ miʈʰɑnɑ əɡəɾo təɾəf kut͡ʃ kəɾʋɑno potɑno səŋkəlp bɾiʈiʃ ʋɑjsəɾɔjne pətɾə ləkʰine d͡ʒəɽ̃ɑʋjoto]

[tɑ| __tʰi me ____ni ɾɑtnɑ bɑɾ ʋɑɡjɑ pət͡ʃʰi ɑ stʰəɭetʰi bɾiʈiʃ səɾkɑɾe tɛmni dʱəɾpəkəɽ kəɾiti]

Simple gloss—

gandhiji's hut-karadi

world famous dandi march after gandhiji here mango's tree under palm date's bark's one hut-in date.14-4-1930-from date.4-5-1930 until residence done was. dandi-in sixth April-at started done salt law break's fight (-to) he here-from speed gave country wide made was. here-from he dharasana's salt's mounds towards march doing's self's resolve British viceroy-to letter written-having notified was.

date.4-from May 1930's night's twelve struck after this place-at-from British government his arrest done was.

Transliteration and detailed gloss—

| gāndhījī-n-ī | jhū̃pṛ-ī-∅ | Karāṛī |
| gandhiji–GEN–FEM | hut–FEM–SG | karadi |

| jag | prasiddh | dāṇḍī | kūc | pachī | gāndhījī-e | ahī̃ | āmb-ā-∅-n-ā | vṛkṣ | nīce |
| world | famous | dandi | march | after | gandhiji–ERG | here | mango–MASC.OBL–SG–GEN–MASC.OBL | tree | under |

| khajūr-ī-∅-n-ā̃ | chaṭiy-ā̃-n-ī | ek | jhū̃pṛ-ī-∅-mā̃ | tā. | 14 4 1930thī | tā. | 4 5 1930 | sudhī |
| palmdate–FEM–SG–GEN–NEUT.OBL | bark–NEUT.PL.OBL–GEN–FEM.OBL | one | hut–FEM–SG–in | date | 14 4 1930–from | date | 4 5 1930 | until |

| nivās | kar-y-o | ha-t-o | . | dāṇḍī-mā̃ | chaṭhṭhī | epril-e | śarū | kar-el-ī | nimak |
| residence.MASC.SG.OBJ.NOM | do–PERF–MASC.SG | be–PAST–MASC.SG | . | dandi–in | sixth | April–at | started | do–PAST.PTCP–FEM | salt |

| kānūn | bhaṅg-n-ī | laṛat-∅-ne | te-m-ṇe | ahī̃-thī | veg | āp-ī | deś | vyāpī |
| law | break–GEN–FEM.OBL | fight.FEM.OBJ–SG–ACC | 3.DIST–HONORIFIC–ERG | here–from | speed–OBJ | give–CONJUNCTIVE | country | wide |

| ban-āv-∅-ī | ha-t-ī | . | ahī̃-thī-j | te-m-ṇe | dharāsaṇā-n-ā |
| become–CAUS–PERF–FEM | be–PAST–FEM | . | here–from–INTENSIFIER | 3.DIST–HONORIFIC–ERG | dharasana–GEN–MASC.PL |

| mīṭh-ā-n-ā | agar-o | taraph | kūc | kar-v-ā-n-o | potā-n-o |
| salt–NEUT.SG.OBL–GEN–MASC.PL | mound.MASC–PL | towards | march.MASC.SG | do–INF–OBL–GEN–MASC.SG | REFL–GEN–MASC.SG |

| saṅkalp | briṭiś | vāīsarôy-∅-ne | patra | lakh-īne | jaṇ-āv-y-o | ha-t-o | . | tā. |
| resolve.MASC.SG.OBJ.ACC | British | viceroy.OBJ–SG–DAT | letter | write–CONJUNCTIVE | know–CAUS–PERF–MASC.SG | be–PAST–MASC.SG | . | date |

| 4-thī | me | 1930-n-ī | rāt-∅-n-ā | bār | vāg-y-ā | pachī | ā | sthaḷ-e-thī | briṭiś |
| 4-th | may | 1930–GEN–FEM.OBL | night.FEM–SG–GEN–MASC.OBL | twelve | strike–PERF–OBL | after | 3.PROX | place–at–from | British |

| sarkār-e | te-m-n-ī | dharpakaṛ | kar-∅-ī | ha-t-ī | . |
| government–ERG | 3.DIST–HONORIFIC–GEN–FEM | arrest.FEM.SG.OBJ.ACC | do–PERF–FEM | be–PAST–FEM | . |

Translation—

Gandhiji's hut-Karadi

After the world-famous Dandi March Gandhiji resided here in a date palm bark hut underneath a/the mango tree, from 14-4-1930 to 4-5-1930. From here he gave speed to and spread country-wide the anti-Salt Law struggle, started in Dandi on 6 April. From here, writing in a letter, he notified the British Viceroy of his resolve of marching towards the salt mounds of Dharasana.

The British government arrested him at this location, after twelve o'clock on the night of 4 May 1930.

Translation (provided at location)—

Gandhiji's hut-Karadi

Here under the mango tree in the hut made of palm leaves (khajoori) Gandhiji stayed from 14-4-1930 to 4-5-1930 after the world famous Dandi march. From here he gave impetus to the civil disobedience movement for breaking the salt act started on 6 April at Dandi and turned it into a nationwide movement. It was also from this place that he wrote a letter to the British viceroy expressing his firm resolve to march to the salt works at Dharasana.

This is the place from where he was arrested by the British government after midnight on 4 May 1930.

== See also ==
- Gujarati journalism
- Gujarati literature
- Lisaan ud-Da'wat il-'Alaviyah (Language of Alavi Bohras)
- Lists of Gujarati-language writers
- Old Gujarati language
- Rathwi Bareli

== Bibliography ==
- Belsare, M.B. (1904) An etymological Gujarati-English Dictionary.
- Deshpande, P.G. & Parnwell, E.C. (1977) Oxford Picture Dictionary. English-Gujarati. Oxford University Press.
- Mehta, B.N. & Mehta, B.B. (1925) The Modern Gujarati-English Dictionary.
- Suthar, B. (2003) Gujarati-English Learner's Dictionary (1 Mb)
- Waghmar, Burzine (2009). Gujarati. In Keith Brown and Sarah Ogilvie (eds.), Concise Encyclopedia of the Languages of the World. Oxford: Elsevier, pp. 468–469.
- Turner, Ralph Lilley (1966), A Comparative Dictionary of the Indo-Aryan Languages, London: Oxford University Press.
- Cardona, George (1965), A Gujarati Reference Grammar, University of Pennsylvania Press.
- Tisdall, W.S. (1892), A Simplified Grammar of the Gujarati Language.
- Gajendragadkar, S.N. (1972), Parsi Gujarati, Bombay: University of Bombay.
- Masica, Colin (1991), The Indo-Aryan Languages, Cambridge: Cambridge University Press, ISBN 978-0-521-29944-2.
- Mistry, P.J. (1996), "Gujarati Writing", in Daniels; Bright (eds.), The World's Writing Systems, Oxford University Press.
- Mistry, P.J. (1997), "Gujarati Phonology", in Kaye, A.S (ed.), Phonologies of Asia and Africa, Winona Lake: Eisenbrauns.
- Mistry, P.J. (2001), "Gujarati", in Garry, Jane; Rubino, Carl (eds.), An encyclopedia of the world's major languages, past and present, New England Publishing Associates.
- Mistry, P.J. (2003), "Gujarati", in Frawley, William (ed.), International Encyclopedia of Linguistics, vol. 2 (2nd ed.), Oxford: Oxford University Press.
- Platts, John T. (John Thompson) (1884), A dictionary of Urdu, classical Hindi, and English, London: W.H. Allen & Co.
- Dalby, Andrew (1998). Dictionary of Languages: The Definitive Reference to More Than 400 Languages. Columbia University Press. ISBN 0-231-11568-7.
- Dwyer, Rachel (1995), Teach Yourself Gujarati, London: Hodder and Stoughton, archived from the original on 2 January 2008.
- Cardona, George; Suthar, Babu (2003), "Gujarati", in Cardona, George; Jain, Dhanesh (eds.), The Indo-Aryan Languages, Routledge, ISBN 978-0-415-77294-5
