= Kalki Jayanti =

Hindu festival dedicated to Kalki

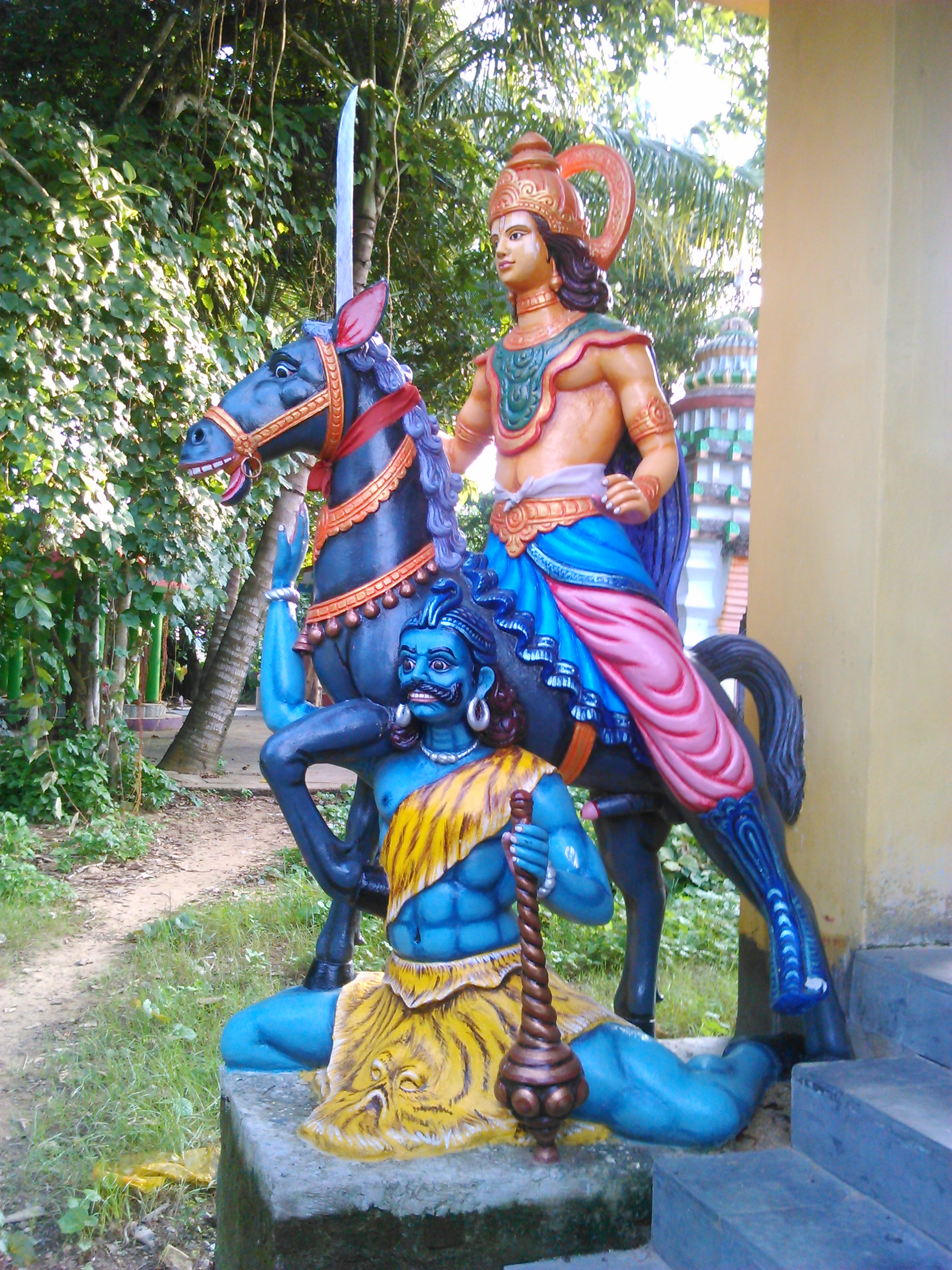
A murti of Kalki defeating a man, who could be a representation of evil at the Sakhibata temple, Kendrapara, Odisha, India.

Kalki Jayanti (Sanskrit: कल्किजयन्ती, romanized: Kalkijayantī) is a Hindu festival that celebrates the prophesied birth of Kalki, the final avatar of Vishnu, who is set to be born near the end of the Kali Yuga to eradicate vices, slay the asura Kali and restore dharma, turning the Wheel of Time to the Satya Yuga. Kalki's birth ceremony is observed on the Dwadashi (12nd day) of the Shuklapaksha of the Bhadrapada month (Shashthi (6th day) of Shukla Paksha in the month of Shravan) as per the traditional Hindu calendars, while in the Gregorian calendar it is the twelfth day of the waxing phase of the moon.

== Significance ==
The Puranas state that Kalki would be born in the village of Shambala, to a Brahmin family, whose parents would be named Vishnuyasha and Sumati (Vishnu Keerthi) This event commences near the end of Kali Yuga, which is described that when Kalki grows up and becomes a trained warrior, he will ride on a divine white horse named Devadatta with a blazing sword, accompanied by a talking parrot, Shuka, who knows everything; the past, present, and future. He then goes around the world to fight evil kingdoms and Kali, who is a demon that has the powers of a yogi to control beings and make them commit adharma. He then restores dharma and returns to his kingdom, and finally to Vaikuntha.

== Celebration ==
During the festival, the devotees wake up early in the morning and take a bath before sunrise The performance of the puja (worship) starts with the bijamantra. After the chanting, an offering of a seat (asana) to Kalki takes place. The murti is then washed with panchamrita as abhisheka, with the offerings of flowers, diya, and incense.

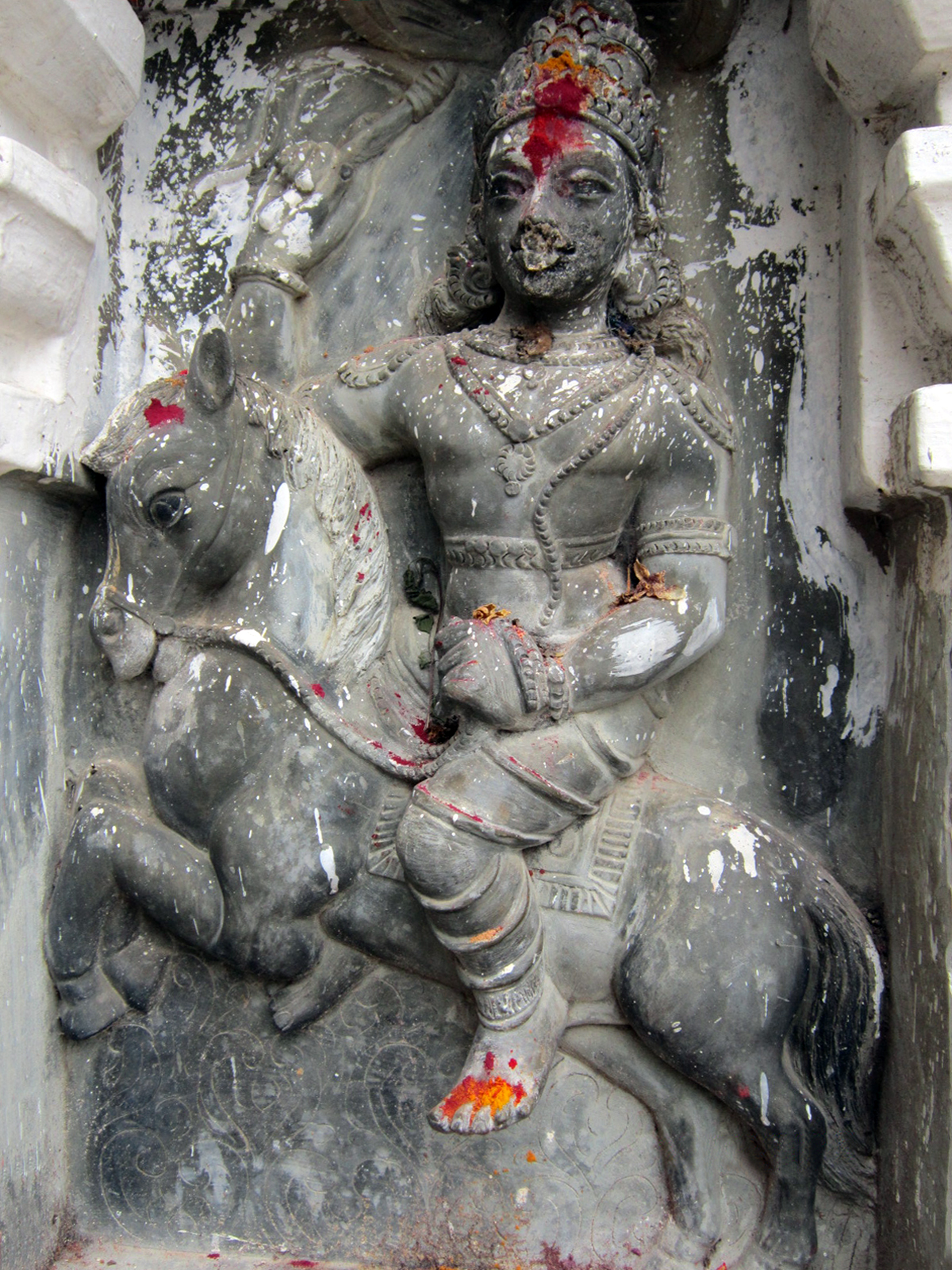
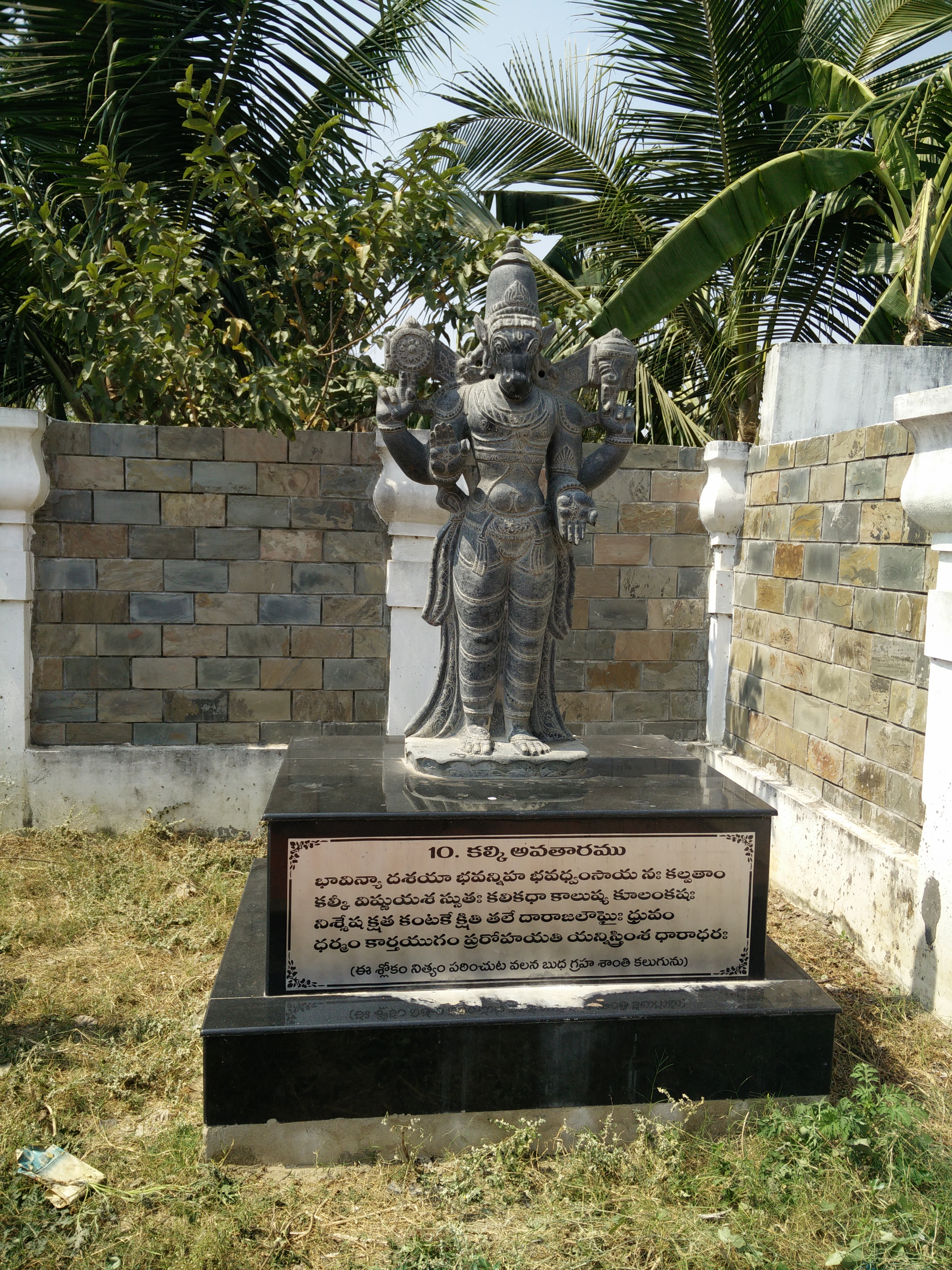
Kalki in his murti (physical, "idol" form) is worshiped in two forms, whereby in the first, he is with a sword while on top of a horse, sometimes trampling over an evil assailant. This form is commonly depicted in North India. The other form depicts him standing upright with a face of a horse, which is common in South India.

During this period, the recitation of the Hari Stotra, Vishnu Sahasranama, Om Namo Bhagavate Vasudevaya, and other mantras are carried out 108 times. The worshippers would then perform dana.

== See also ==
- Kalki
- Kalki Purana
- Dashavatara
