= Trishna =

Trishna may refer to

- TRISHNA, a planned Indo-French satellite
- Taṇhā, the Buddhist concept of thirst or desire
- Trishna (Vedic thought), the Vedic concept of thirst or desire
- Trishna (1978 film), a drama directed and produced by Sippy Films in India
- Thrishna, a 1981 Indian Malayalam-language film by I. V. Sasi
- Trishna (2009 film), an Indian romance film directed by Pritam Jalan
- Trishna (2011 film), a film adaptation of Tess of the d'Urbervilles and directed by Michael Winterbottom
- Trishna (restaurant), in London
- Trishna (TV show), a romantic Indian TV show on Doordarshan
- Trishna (yacht), a yacht belonging to the Corps of Engineers of the Indian Army
- Krishna and Trishna, Bangladeshi conjoined twins
