= Deen-e-Illahi =

Deen-e-Illahi, which literally means "religion of God", may refer to:

- Din-e Ilahi, a syncretic religion founded by the Mughal emperor Akbar the Great in 1582 AD.
- Deen-e-Illahi, a controversial book on the topic of spirituality and mysticism by Riaz Ahmed Gohar Shahi published in 2000.
