= Messiah Foundation International =

Spiritual Organization

- Abbreviation: MFI
- Formation: 2002; 24 years ago
- Type: Organisation
- Legal status: Foundation
- Headquarters: London
- Location: United Kingdom
- Region served: Worldwide
- Leader: Riaz Ahmed Gohar Shahi
- Key people: Younus AlGohar (Co-founder and CEO), Farah Naz (Guardian of MFI)
- Affiliations: Kalki Avatar Foundation, Mehdi Foundation International, Interfaith Institute of Divine Love
- Website: http://www.goharshahi.gs

Messiah Foundation International (Urdu: مہدی فاونڈیشن انٹرنیشنل) (or MFI) is a spiritual organisation formally established in 2002 to promote the Goharian Philosophy of Divine Love. MFI is the successor of RAGS International, a spiritual organisation founded by Pakistani spiritual leader Riaz Ahmed Gohar Shahi in 1980. The organisation claims to be a syncretic fulfilment of Christian, Muslim, Jewish and Hindu prophecy, with Shahi depicted as the messianic figure of many religions, given the title of Mehdi, Messiah, and Kalki Avatar as well as the generic "Awaited One" prophesied by other religions.

Adherents propose to promote the reduction of hatred, promotion of divine love and world peace, and raise awareness of miraculous images of spiritual figures they claim are on the face of such objects as the moon, sun, and the Black Stone in Mecca. According to MFI, these images were put on these locations by God. The MFI claims that Gohar Shahi's image on the moon has spoken to people in different languages and conferred spiritual grace on those seeking divine love. They declare that the titles of the Messiah, Kalki Avatar and Imam Mehdi are different titles for one personality, whom they depict as Shahi. Members of the MFI refer to themselves as Goharians, due to their affiliation with Shahi.

== History ==
MFI was previously known as "RAGS International" until the year 2002, when Younus AlGohar became the CEO and formally established the organisation. At this time, AlGohar also formed MFI's sister organisation, Kalki Avatar Foundation, under the apparent guidance of Shahi. After Shahi's disappearance in 2001, Shahi's followers in the MFI declared it to be akin to miraculous occultation and continued their activities under the leadership of AlGohar, who they claim is the personally appointed representative of Shahi. In June 2018, Shahi's daughter, Farah Naz, expressed her support of the MFI and was appointed the role of 'Guardian' of the MFI.

The organisation's stated objectives are to promote Shahi's teachings on divine love and global peace. They consider it their responsibility to propagate alleged images of Shahi, Jesus, Durga, and others on the Moon, Sun, and the Black Stone, which they say are "divine signs". Though MFI has not released an official count of its members, Younus AlGohar has stated that the number is in the thousands.

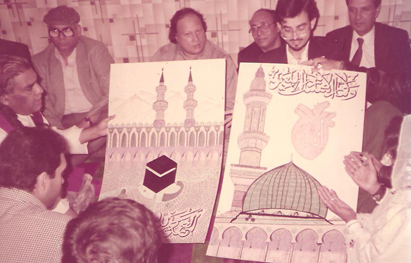
Shahi's message presented to Nusrat Fateh Ali Khan and Ghulam Farid Sabri by an MFI qawalist, Hafiz Nadeem Siddiqui.

== Shahi's alleged meeting with Jesus ==
Shahi claimed to have met with Jesus on 29 May 1997 in Taos, New Mexico. When asked what was discussed between him and Jesus, Shahi stated that it was confidential and would be revealed at "an appropriate time". After this incident, an image of Jesus, which the photograph's owner claimed had appeared miraculously from pictures taken of sacred places, was shown to Shahi in Tucson, Arizona. It was then announced by Shahi to be the "original image of Jesus Christ." The MFI has taken this to mean Shahi has the support of Jesus and propagates Jesus as a "universal figure of divinity" who is for humanity rather than being confined to Christianity.

== Teachings and Beliefs ==
They profess to be peace-promoting. They condemn hate-preaching, especially in the context of religion. Their teachings, based on the Goharian Philosophy of Mystical Sciences and Divine Love, are purported to be acceptable to all regardless of religious affiliation or nationality.

=== Method ===
According to their methodology, God's love is implanted in the heart when one's heart is initiated with God's name. In this approach, the name of God is supposed to become synchronised within the heartbeats to produce "divine energy" which would then clean the heart and implant love of God so as to connect the aspirant with God. It is referred to Zikr-e-Qalb in Islamic terminology and "Simran" in Hindu terminology. The MFI claims not to be influenced by any one religion or faith and does not discriminate against anyone based on "nation, religion, cast, creed", etc. The organisation asserts that religions have both an inner dimension and an outer dimension. The teachings state that the outer aspect of the religion is ritual and bodily worship. In contrast, the inner religion is purification of the heart and souls to gain connection with God. In their beliefs, the inner religion is the core while the outer religion is like a "potato skin". They further claim that the spiritual system within the religions today has diminished. They seek to "convert the heart towards divine love" rather than to a particular religion. AlGohar asserts that because the MFI does not emphasize rituals and worship, people from different religions can follow their teachings while practicing their faith.

=== Eschatology ===
The MFI maintains that the world is passing through its twilight phase. Members propagate that the world is supposed to end in 2026, when a comet would collide with Earth in accordance with Shahi's predictions in The Religion of God. They also declare that the only hope for humanity is Shahi and that his image they propagate to be on the Moon will provide salvation for humanity "when calamity strikes".

=== Claimed miracles ===
- The MFI believes in spiritual healing, offering that service to the wider community. It claims to heal all diseases and ailments, including HIV and AIDS, and also claims that it has done so in the past. They also publicise that the alleged image of Shahi on the Moon performs healing.
- The MFI claims divine intervention caused a sandstorm during an attack on an MFI procession in Faisalabad, Pakistan. Members were allegedly attacked with bricks and bullets by local Muslims angered by the claims that Shahi represented the Mehdi. Reports provided show that such had happened, but none of the members were injured, to which the members credited the "miracle".

== The Religion of God by Shahi ==
Before his disappearance, Shahi wrote a book titled Deen-e-Ilahi (literally "the Religion of God"). Deen-e-Ilahi explains the secrets of spirituality as per the understanding of Shahi. On the front cover, Shahi states, "This book requires unruffled concentration and attention, pondering and research from all religious sects and every man. It poses a challenge for those who reject the existence of Spirituality." Originally Deen-e-Ilahi was written in Urdu, the native tongue of Shahi, however the book is available in English, Dutch, Arabic, French, German, Hindi, Italian, Persian, Portuguese, Sindhi, Spanish, Thai, and Tamil as well.

MFI distributes the book for free and through Balboa Press, which republished it in English on 17 May 2012. As of 29 June 2012, it was #5 on the publisher's Best Seller's List. Deen-e-Ilahi is now banned in Pakistan, due to it allegedly carrying material offensive to Muslims.

== Controversy ==
MFI has been opposed by religious groups, particularly in Pakistan. In many cases, which later proved false, have been instigated against Shahi. Concerning this subject, the following is written in The Religion of God, written by Shahi:

The Wahhabi denomination has very religiously taken it to persecute, discourage, entrap, and eradicate His Divine Eminence Gohar Shahi. Hence, they instigated various false cases against His Divine Eminence Gohar Shahi. They have been threatened by the universality of His Divine Eminence’s message of Divine Love and His ever-increasing fame in the global sphere.

The government of Pakistan also banned The Religion of God and its author's magazine Hatif-e-Mehdi for allegedly "...[containing] matter which is objectionable and maliciously intended to outrage the religious feelings of the Muslims and these should be seized".

AlGohar has also been persecuted by the government of Pakistan, having been issued a death sentence for allegedly blaspheming, though details of his blasphemy have not been disclosed.

MFI claims that the Pakistani government has persecuted and jailed some 50 MFI members under false charges of blasphemy against Islam. First Information Reports have been registered against officials of MFI in Pakistan.

In a related incident, an armed group hijacked a bus in Faisalabad, claimed that their leader was the Imam Mehdi, and went on to have a shootout with the police. This had been falsely attributed to Messiah Foundation International. The leader, Shahbaz Khan, claimed in an interview with a Pakistani newspaper to be supported by the alleged billionaire and hypnotist Younus AlGohar. These claims were not verified.

A press release by MFI stated, "The false claimant Shahbaz has no association with MFI. Shahbaz is a severely misguided and blasphemous to His Holiness Gohar Shahi. Shahbaz, the impostor has demanded the government to deal with Goharians harshly which suggests that he does not belong to MFI". It is also stated in the same press release that MFI believes Shahi to be the only awaited Imam Mehdi and does not support Shahbaz Khan. In an open letter to the former president of Pakistan Pervez Musharraf, Younus AlGohar demanded justice be served to the 50 or so MFI members who had been persecuted because Khan claimed to be associated with MFI. In addition, the Sunday Telegraph stated that "There is no suggestion that [Messiah Foundation International] either organised [Shahbaz] Ahmed's actions in Pakistan or knew what he and his disciples were planning".

Due to the nature of topics covered in speeches by AlGohar released onto the internet, some Muslims in Pakistan have staged protests against MFI and declared them infidels. Furthermore, newspapers in Pakistan reported protesters demanding that MFI members be punished.

== Persecution ==
Extract written by Eric Lubbock, 4th Baron Avebury, in his report on the MFI.

On 11 August 2008, a blasphemy case 295A, PPC was registered against eight MFI members by the Khatam-e-Nabuwwat (FIR No. 281/2008, Date of Occurrence 8 August 2008), at Police Station Kotri, District Jamshoro, Sindh Province, Pakistan. (See copy of English translation of FIR, attached) On 5 August 2008 two MFI members (Mustaqeem and Umer) were severely beaten by extremists, but an FIR was registered against MFI members (FIR No. C/31/08, Date of Report 6 August 2008, Police Station Sharif Abad, District Karachi, Sindh Province, Pakistan) (See copy of English translation of FIR, attached)

On 18 October 2008 at 03.30 Mr Mohammad Iqbal (whose family was active in MFI) was murdered (FIR No. 995/2008, Offence u/s 302, 148, 149 PPC, Date of Report 16 October 2008 at 0500 AM, Police Station Factory Area, District Shaikhupura, Punjab Province, Pakistan)(See copy of English translation of FIR, attached). Hatred has been incited against the MFI members in Pakistan, who are accused of blasphemy, and these incidents are examples of the result. The National Human Rights Commission (NHRC), New Delhi, wrote on 4 September 2008, to the Ministry of Home Affairs, Government, setting out the case well. It was reported on 4 August 2009 in the daily Safeer, that Mr. Paras Masih, organiser for the Christian community of the MFI, had been murdered in Karachi.

In another case, members of MFI in Pakistan were arrested and charged for claiming Shahi as being the Imam Mehdi. According to Dawn.com,

2005 – December 23: Five members of the Mehdi Foundation International were arrested in Wapda Town, Lahore, for putting up posters of their leader, Riaz Gohar Shahi, showing him as 'Imam Mehdi'. The Anti-Terrorism Court sentenced each to five years' imprisonment under Section 295-A of the PPC. Their prisoners' records posted outside the cell falsely indicate that they had been sentenced under 295-C – the Blasphemy Law.

The prisoners "were forced to parade naked, hung up in the air and beaten", and were sexually abused in jail by staff members.

=== MFI Members in Tihar Jail ===
On 23 April 2007, 63 Pakistani MFI members, who had obtained tourist visas for India, protested outside the Pakistani Embassy in Yantra Mantra, New Delhi, India, against the government of Pakistan. They asked India for asylum, refusing to return to their homeland. During their protests, they burnt their passports and travel documents that tied them to Pakistan, Pakistani flags, and effigies of Pervez Musharraf and Maulana Fazlur Rehman. They were subsequently arrested for having no travel documentation and therefore being in India illegally. It is reported that they feared for their lives in Pakistan, where if they went back they would be charged with the Blasphemy Law, the penalty for which is death. According to Zee News, IBN Live, Outlook India and other newspapers, the Pakistani government had banned their practice of faith in Pakistan.

Among the 63 members were 19 women, 5 of whom are pregnant in "advanced stages" and 7 children. The DNA reports, "The Pakistani judges said they were shocked to see 16 Pakistani prisoners had lost their mental balance in Amritsar jail." Later, the United Nations Human Rights Council in New Delhi recommended to the government of India that the Pakistani nationals should not be deported back "till a proper decision on their request for asylum is taken by the government."

On 22 May 2007, in front of Indian Embassy in London, the MFI staged a demonstration to bring attention to the situation of their members in jail and the dangers they faced if the Indian government decided to deport them to Pakistan.

In the 2007 annual report on Pakistan, Human Rights Without Frontiers appealed to the National Human Rights Commission in India about the MFI case: "Is the Commission aware of the case of the planned deportation by India of 62 Pakistani citizens...? [India]is a secular democracy observing high standards of human rights including the right of peaceful practice of religion, and Pakistani Muslims consider that the religious beliefs of the Mehdi Foundation International are blasphemous, making its followers vulnerable to criminal charges for which the penalty is death under the controversial Pakistani Blasphemy Act."

The NHRC stated in reply that "The Commission...will examine...the most appropriate follow-up". However, the Telegraph in Calcutta, as well as other Indian newspapers, reported on 26 November 2009 that the plea to involve the National Human Rights Commission had been rejected by the government of India and that the Pakistani nationals were being put in the process of deportation despite the fact that, upon deportation, they would be charged under the blasphemy laws in Pakistan. In December 2010, however, the Hindustan Times reported that the Delhi high court had issued a protection order for the inmates, preventing their deportation for 70 days as of 2 December. Mail Today reported in March 2011 that the UNHCR was asked by the Indian High Commission to conduct interviews of the jail members and grant them asylum in countries other than India within 6 weeks of 2 December 2010. This was extended another 3 weeks, but the possibility of them being deported to Pakistan had not been ruled out. In April 2011, though the Centre wished to deport the Pakistani nationals, the Delhi High Court ordered the Centre to wait until it made a decision on a plea to hand them over to the United Nations High Commission of Refugees. On 21 April 2011, the Times of India and other Indian newspapers reported that the Indian government had granted the MFI members in jail refugee status and had requested the UNHCR to search for a third country for their relocation.

In December 2011, several newspapers reported that 65 MFI members from Tihar Jail had been granted refugee status and were being sent to Canada and the United States. They are now settled in said countries.

=== Protests ===
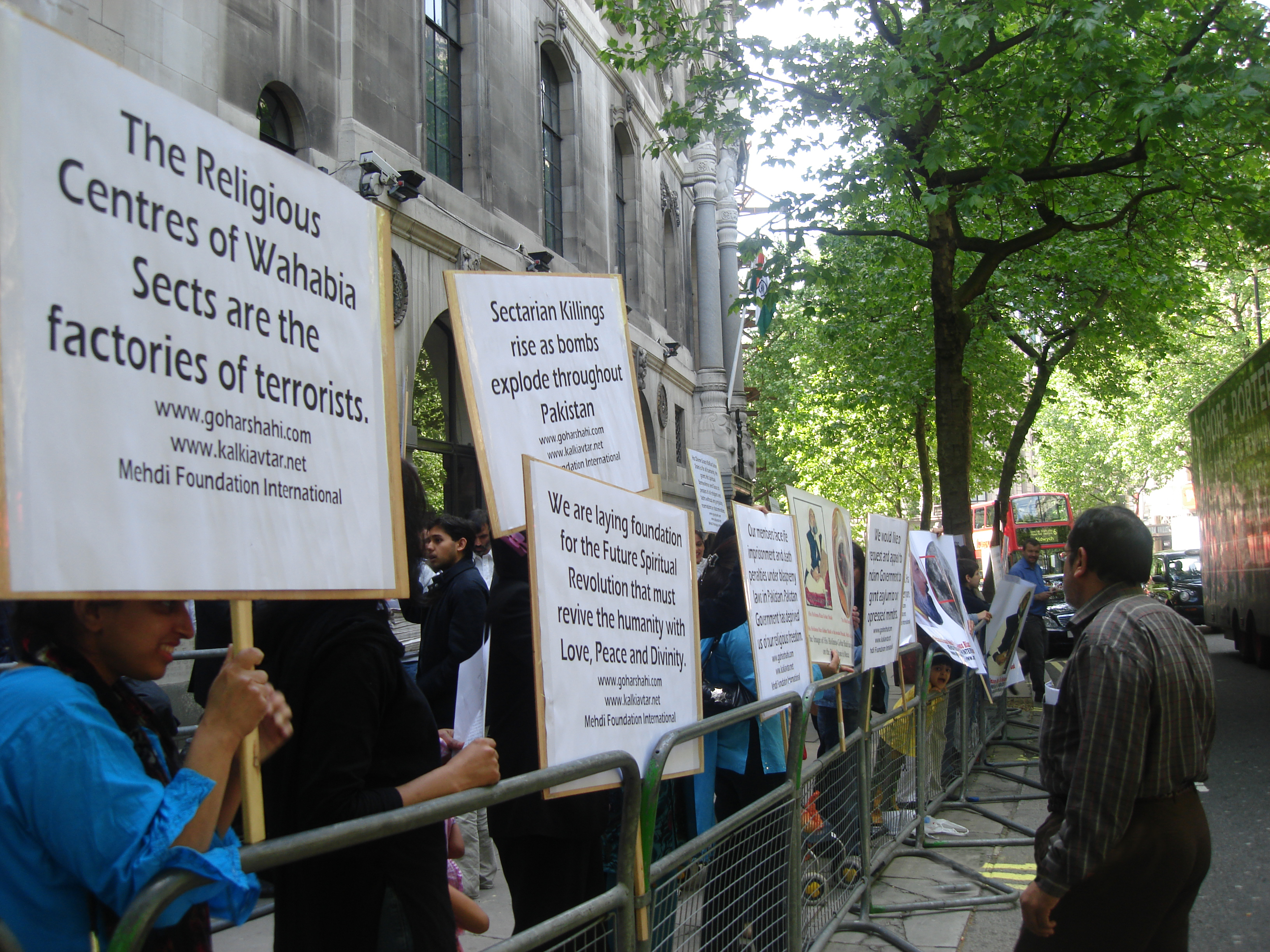
Protestors occupying the street outside the Indian Embassy, London

MFI has held numerous protests and rallies over the years to draw attention to how its members are treated in Pakistan and to its cause. They staged demonstrations on 16 August 2005 in front of the Pakistan high commission in London and on 25 August 2005 on 10 Downing Street, London, UK. On 25 July 2005, MFI members in Pakistan staged a rally in front of the Parliament of Pakistan in Islamabad to express their support for Pervez Musharraf in his anti-terrorism endeavours.

The MFI has also called for Wahhabism to be banned in the United States of America, the United Kingdom, and India, due to its alleged link to terrorism and hate preaching. Due in part to their efforts in India to raise awareness of Zakir Naik's link to Wahhabism, he was declared a proclaimed offender by the National Investigation Agency and his Indian passport was revoked.

== Expansion ==
Messiah/Mehdi Foundation International has centres in Canada, the United States of America, the United Kingdom, Australia, India, Greece, Thailand, Taiwan, South Korea, Nepal, Japan, Bangladesh, and Pakistan. In association with their sister organisation, Kalki Avatar Foundation, the organisation has centres located in Sri Lanka and India, where they have been featured on television. Representatives of MFI often visit spiritualist expositions and programmes as well as hold events.

== Media ==
MFI also puts out monthly newspapers. Their newspaper, 'Hatif-e-Mehdi' ('The Voice of Mehdi') is distributed in Urdu, English, and Arabic and is authored by Shahi. Their literature is circulated worldwide. The organisation has received media attention primarily for cases against its members in India and Pakistan. They have received attention for their activities in Sri Lanka and Canada. They launched free apps for Apple's iPhone, iPod Touch and iPad in September 2010. In June 2011, they launched the "Imam Mehdi" Application for the Android system. The MFI also has official YouTube channels. The MFI has an official blog and an official Twitter account. They are also on Facebook.
