= Kalki Avatar Foundation =

New religious movement

- Abbreviation: KAF
- Formation: 2000
- Type: Organisation
- Purpose: Promotion of divine love, global peace, spiritual sciences, and teachings of Riaz Ahmed Gohar Shahi
- Headquarters: London
- Region served: Worldwide
- Leader: Younus AlGohar (Founder)
- Affiliations: Messiah Foundation International
- Website: http://www.kalkiavatarfoundation.com/

The Kalki Avatar Foundation is a spiritual organization headquartered in London, United Kingdom. Foundation's goals include raising awareness of the spiritual sciences, promoting divine love and tolerance among all peoples, and propagating the belief that Shahi is the awaited Kalki Avatar.

== History ==
The Kalki Avatar Foundation was founded in 2000 by Younus AlGohar under the guidance of Riaz Ahmed Gohar Shahi, and bases its principles on his teachings. It is a sister organisation of Messiah Foundation International.

== Operations ==
Headquartered in London, United Kingdom, the organization operates in several countries, including Sri Lanka, India, Nepal, Bangladesh, Pakistan, the United States of America, Canada, Australia, Japan, and South Korea as well. The organisation is particularly active in Sri Lanka.
