= Durukti =

Wife of the asura Kali in Hindu mythology

- Calumny
- Devanagari: दुरुक्ति
- Sanskrit transliteration: Durukti
- Affiliation: Asura
- Texts: Kalki Purana; Bhagavata Purana

Genealogy
- Parents: Krodha (anger) (father); Himsa (violence) (mother)
- Siblings: Kali
- Children: Bhaya (fear) (son); Mrutyu (death) (daughter)

Durukti (Sanskrit: दुरुक्ति, romanized: Durukti) is the sister and wife of the asura Kali in Hindu mythology.

== Etymology ==
Durukti is derived from the Sanskrit roots दुर् (dur): "bad" and उक्ति (ukti): "speech"; lit. bad or offensive speech.

== Legend ==
Durukti is the daughter of Krodha (anger) and Himsa (violence). She begets a son named Bhaya (fear) and a daughter named Mrutyu (death). She is also the grandmother of a boy named Niraya (hell) and a girl named Yatana (torture) begotten by her children Bhaya and Mrutyu. Durukti and Kali belong to the lineage of Adharma (impropriety), who grows up from the Malinapataka, a deadly dark and sinful affliction produced from Brahma's back at the time of creation. Durukti is the granddaughter of Lobha (greed) and Nikriti (dishonesty), great-granddaughter of Dambha (vanity) and Maya (illusion), and great-great-granddaughter of Adharma and Mithya (falsehood).

According to the Kalki Purana, Durukti dies shortly before Kali.

=== Television ===
Television serial	Played by
Namah Lakshmi Narayan	Sara Khan as Kali's wife

== Sources ==
- Kalki Purana of Sri Veda Vyasa (Sanskrit), edited and published by Sri Jibananda Vidyasagara Bhattacharya at Narayana Press (Calcutta) in 1890, Section 1: Chapter 1 & Section 3: Chapter 7. Retrieved 5 September 2017.
- The Penguin Book of Hindu Names, by Maneka Gandhi, pg 125. Retrieved 5 September 2017.
- Sinhalese English Dictionary, by B. Clough, pg 796. Retrieved 5 September 2017.
- Book. The Telegraph (Calcutta). 11 February 2013. Retrieved 5 September 2017.
