= Dhok Gohar Shah =

- Village
- Country: Pakistan
- Province: Punjab (Pakistan)
- District: Rawalpindi
- Time zone: UTC+5 (PST)

Dhok Gohar Shah is a village in Rawalpindi District in the Punjab province of Pakistan.

The Mausoleum of Syed Ali Gohar Shah, also known Baba Gohar Ali Shah, is also in Dhok Gohar Shah. Originally he was from Kashmir, however, later he migrated to a suburb of Rawalpindi near Gujar Khan, the place is dedicated to his name and called Dhok Gohar Shah means village of Gohar Shah.

== Notable people ==
- Riaz Ahmed Gohar Shahi, religious leader who mysteriously disappeared in 2001
