= Kalki (novel) =

1978 novel by Gore Vidal

- Cover of the British first edition
- Author: Gore Vidal
- Language: English
- Publisher: Random House
- Publication date: 1978
- Publication place: United States
- Media type: Print (hardcover & paperback)
- Pages: 255 pp
- ISBN: 0-394-42053-5
- OCLC: 3516173
- Dewey Decimal: 813/.5/4
- LC Class: PZ3.V6668 Kal PS3543.I26

Kalki is a 1978 pre/post-apocalyptic novel by American author Gore Vidal.

Kalki is narrated by Theodora (Teddy) Ottinger, a Southern Californian aviator ("aviatrix" in the text) and author, who, after publishing a book called Beyond Motherhood, comes to the attention of Kalki, the leader of a Kathmandu-based religious cult. The cult secretly makes its money through selling drugs and then gives it away using lotus lotteries. Kalki claims to be God, as well as the final Avatar of Vishnu, who is going to end the human race on April 3. The planet will then be rid of the wicked and a fresh, clean start will usher in a new golden age. Ottinger suspects that Kalki will create a worldwide nuclear chain reaction which will annihilate every living thing and leave the planet uninhabitable. When the threatened apocalypse does occur, however, it does not take the form which Ottinger had feared, as only the human species succumbs to extinction.

The novel covers many cultural and political topics such as overpopulation, birth control, bisexuality and feminism.

== Plot summary ==
James J. Kelly, a former soldier in the American military, finds out that the American and Soviet governments are about to conduct tests of a new kind of neutron bomb called the model b or the nC, which will kill every living thing on the planet, leaving it uninhabitable for centuries. The American generals know the cataclysmic effects of conducting these tests but they acquiesce to the tests anyway, ignoring a report provided to the National Security Council which predicts the end of the world if six or more nCs are simultaneously exploded. Mistakenly assured that the Soviets would not explode reciprocating nCs, the generals are unwittingly about to destroy the whole world.

Kelly decides to save the human race through an elaborate religious hoax, declaring himself to be Kalki and announcing the end of the world. His secret plan is to kill off everyone in the world except for himself and his wife Lakshmi. They would become the Adam and Eve to a new human race by giving birth to three sons and six daughters over the next twelve years, who would then intermarry; in approximately two centuries the world would be fairly well populated again.

In addition to himself and his wife, Kalki decides to bring along three more people to his new world, teachers called Perfect Masters, chosen for their knowledge and the fact that they are all sterile. These three people will teach various fields of science to the new race. Teddy Ottinger will teach engineering, Geraldine O'Connor biology and genetics, and Dr. Giles Lowell medicine. Kalki's wife Lakshmi is herself a physicist, and Kalki is a chemical engineer.

Kalki succeeds in carrying out his plan and the entire world dies, leaving behind only Kalki, his wife Lakshmi and the three other Perfect Masters. However, Kalki's plans go awry when Lakshmi miscarries the first baby girl and it is learnt that Lakshmi is incapable of having children with Kalki. At this point, the only other male in the group, Dr. Lowell, announces that he never had a vasectomy and is now the only one with whom Lakshmi can conceive a child. It had been his plan all along to be the one to father the new human race with Lakshmi, whom he claims to be in love with. When Dr. Lowell admits his treachery, Kalki kills him.

The story ends with a postscript from Kelly/Kalki, 43 years after the apocalyptic plague. In the interim period, Teddy died 27 years after the plague and Geraldine (Teddy's lover and Kalki's second consort) died, as has Lakshmi. Kalki has become the last human alive, and with his death, the human species will become extinct. It is implied that simians will inherit the post-apocalyptic world.

== Characters ==
The five Perfect Masters

- Kalki, formerly James J. Kelly – Ex-US Army chemical-warfare chemist and purported 10th reincarnation of the god Vishnu; eventual last human survivor.
- Lakshmi, formerly Doris Pannicker – Nuclear physicist and reincarnation of Vishnu's wife.
- Dr. Giles Lowell (also CIA agent Dr. Ashok in disguise) – Medical doctor and avatar of Ravana.
- Geraldine O'Connor – Biochemist and geneticist.
- Theodora Hecht Ottinger (Teddy) – Engineer, aviatrix, and the novel's narrator.

== Reception ==
Kalki was a finalist for the 1978 Nebula Award for Best Novel.

Christopher Lehmann-Haupt gave Kalki a mixed review, saying that while the story is initially entertaining, "an icy wind blows throughout the novel, and when all is said and done that wind has blasted the characters and plot of Kalki into just so many opinions ... By the end, it doesn't seem like fiction at all that we're reading, but just another clever dissertation by Gore Vidal."

Time critic R. Z. Sheppard took a more favorable view, finding the novel "an amusing, brittle tissue of truths culled largely from the journalistic sources Vidal enjoys satirizing." He described Kalki as "an apocalyptical extravaganza that craftily combines feminism, homosexuality, mysticism, science fiction, fiction science, the second law of thermodynamics, the first law of survival, high fashion and low animal cunning" and its plot as "diabolically clever."

Orson Scott Card, writing expressly from a genre perspective, faulted Vidal's narrator as "intensely boring," but praised the apocalyptic conclusion: "Kalki left me with the haunting feeling that there was something grateful about four billion people leaving life suddenly, without panic, without a chance to soil their last moments with repentance or greed."
