= Younus AlGohar =

British-Pakistani activist

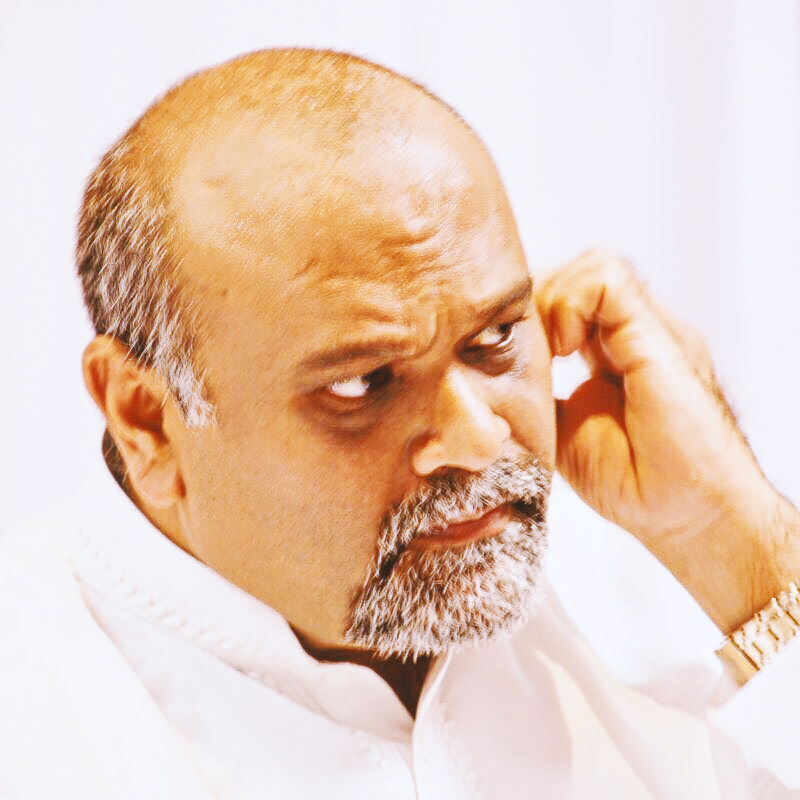
- Younus AlGohar (September 2015)
- Born: 16 June 1968 (age 58); Karachi, Pakistan
- Other names: Sayyedi (Honourable), AlGohar, Mohammad Younus
- Education: Manchester University, Cambridge University
- Organization(s): Messiah Foundation International, Mehdi Foundation International, Kalki Avatar Foundation
- Awards: 'Man of Valour', 'Universal Peace Ambassador'

Younus AlGohar (یونس الگوھر, born Mohammad Younus; 16 June 1969) is a British co-founder of Messiah Foundation International (also known as Kalki Avatar Foundation and Mehdi Foundation International), a spiritual organisation which advocates for Riaz Ahmed Gohar Shahi mystical teachings and claims he is the Messiah (Mahdi). He authored the books Mysterious Horizons – Beyond God (2007), and Nisāb-e-Mehdi نصا ب مہدی (2010).

== Biography ==
Riaz Ahmed Gohar Shahi and Younus AlGohar during a program in the UK

In 1983, at the age of 15 he met Riaz Ahmed Gohar Shahi and spent 18 years as a close disciple, until Shahi's disappearance in 2001.

== Messiah Foundation International ==
RAGS International was founded by Riaz Ahmed Gohar Shahi in 1980, and renamed in 2000 as Messiah Foundation International. The first centre for MFI was established in London, which is the headquarters of MFI. MFI has grown to include centres in Canada, USA, South Korea, Sri Lanka, Japan, Australia, India, Greece, Thailand, Bangladesh, Taiwan and Pakistan and Nepal.

== Beliefs and views ==
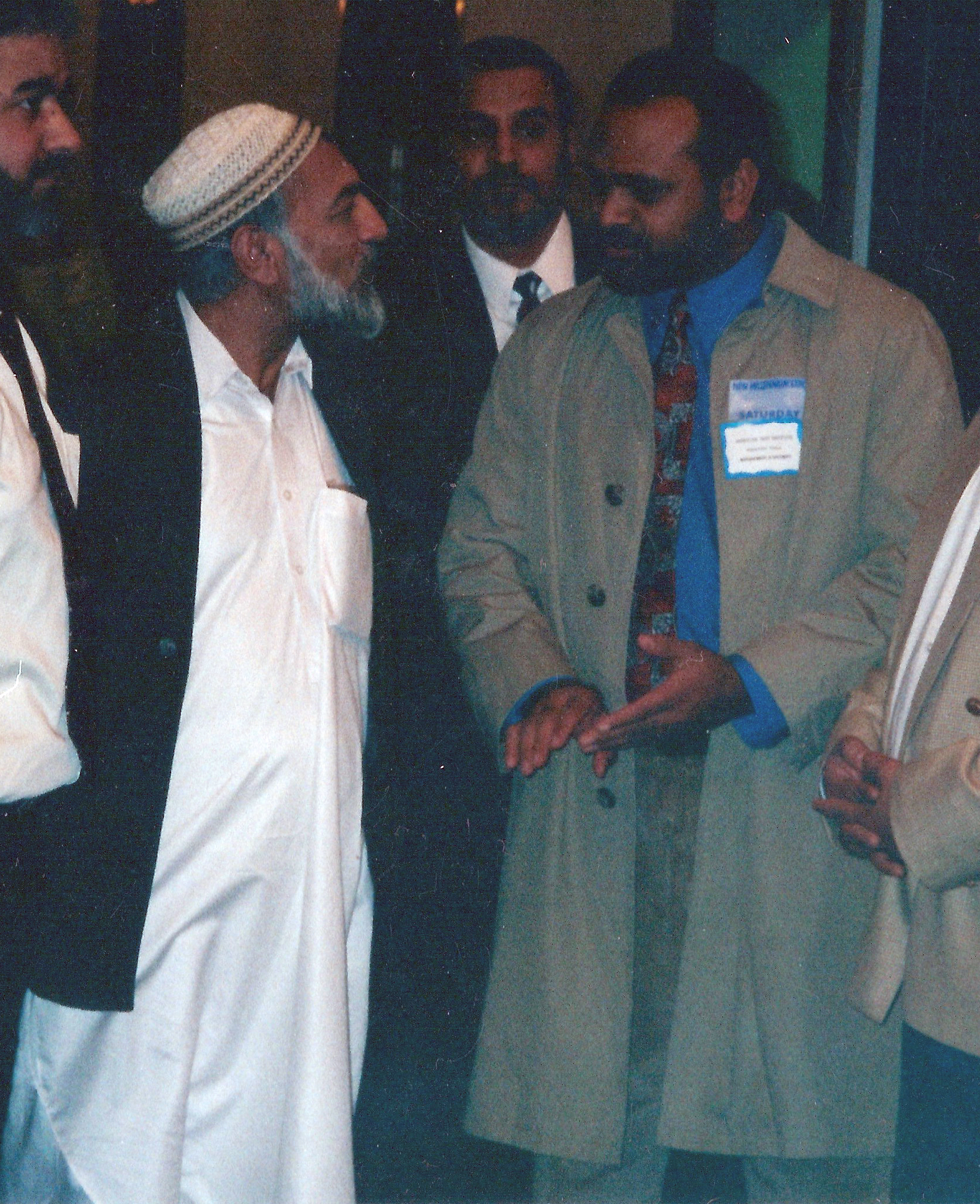
Riaz Ahmed Gohar Shahi and Younus AlGohar at an event held in USA, 1999

AlGohar considers himself a "devout servant" of Shahi who practices "The Religion of God", which AlGohar says Shahi has introduced to humanity. According to AlGohar, he believes in all the Prophets, the Messengers and the saints regardless of their religion. He asserts that he does not reject or hate any religion but believes that the spiritual system in all religions, which helped humanity find God, has diminished due to modifications in the religions. According to him, his goals include preaching spirituality irrespective of religious or cultural boundaries, revolutionising humanity by reviving spiritual insight, establishing inner and outer peace, eliminating hatred from society, enlightening hearts with divine energy, and heralding the second coming of Jesus Christ and Riaz Ahmed Gohar Shahi. He has openly challenged Islamic Scholars to have "a healthy debate on this topic should it arise a theological reservation among the minds of petty scholars." In particular, AlGohar has challenged Muhammad Tahir-ul-Qadri to debates on spirituality, saints, Imam Mehdi and Islam. AlGohar also declares that the world is in the end times.

=== Stand against Terrorism ===
AlGohar opposes Wahhabism which he considers a threat to Islam and the entire world. He has spoken out against ISIS. He believes that Wahhabism is the ideology of Islamic militants, stating that madrassas teaching the Wahhabi ideology are engaging in hate preaching and are producing terrorists. He has urged world leaders to impose sanctions on Saudi Arabia for their role in promoting terrorism. He has called for Wahhabism to be banned in the United Kingdom, United States of America and India. He engages in efforts to de-radicalise Muslim youth by promoting Sufism and has started an initiative called Young Sufis of the Great Britain with the Messiah Foundation International for this purpose.

=== Malaysian Court Ruling ===
AlGohar criticised the October 2013 Malaysian court ruling banning non-Muslims from using the word, 'Allah'. He accused the judges who made the decision of being 'highly ignorant, shortsighted and prejudiced.' He argued that to confine Allah to Islam was to suggest that the God of Muslims was different from the God of all others and that it was shirk.

== Prosecution and Persecution ==
Many attempts were made on the lives of Gohar Shahi and Younus AlGohar including a petrol bomb thrown into AlGohar's residence in Manchester, where Shahi stayed when he toured the United Kingdom.

In August 2014, AlGohar was a vocal supporter of Imran Khan's rally against electoral fraud in Pakistan's 2013 elections. AlGohar's support of Imran Khan and Pakistan Tehreek-e-Insaf was a matter of controversy in the Pakistani media, drawing comments from Nusrat Javed and Mushtaq Minhas, who alleged on Bolta Pakistan that AlGohar was funding Imran Khan's campaign and conspiring against Pakistan. Immediately after the episode was aired, Mehdi Foundation International posted AlGohar's video response on their YouTube channel, in which AlGohar stated that he had no affiliation with Imran Khan, but was rather hoping for justice. Shireen Mazari soon issued a statement distancing Pakistan Tehreek-e-Insaf from AlGohar. AlGohar later withdrew his support of Imran Khan.

In 2013, AlGohar was convicted of benefit fraud. He pleaded guilty to 11 out of 12 charges of dishonesty under the Social Security Administration Act 1992. AlGohar was ordered to pay a £6000 fine and perform 240 hours of community service.

=== Media coverage ===
AlGohar was featured in an article by the Lakbima newspaper and was interviewed by the Sri Lankan newspaper, The Island. He was featured by Your Local Guardian in 2009. He was also interviewed by various Sri Lankan media in 2011, 2012 and 2015, including The Sunday Leader and the Island. He was covered by Tamil language newspapers and television stations. In addition, he was invited by the Brahma Kumaris to speak on 'The Call of Time' in Sri Lanka and by Good Morning Sri Lanka to discuss spirituality. AlGohar was also invited by TNL TV in Sri Lanka to explain the message of Kalki Avatar Foundation. During his tour of Sri Lanka in December 2013, he was interviewed on TNL TV again and spoke on ITN Prime TV's Face On. His visit was also covered by national Tamil-language newspapers. AlGohar's comments on the Malaysian court ruling regarding the prohibition of the word 'Allah' for non-Muslims were published in Free Malaysia Today in January and February 2014. In Phoenix, Arizona, he was interviewed by Asia Today about his beliefs, Shahi and Messiah Foundation International. His next interviews with the Island were published in September 2015 and May 2016. His article entitled 'Dysfunctionality of Religions' was published by Asia Today in September 2016. His commentary on Saudi Arabia's links to Wahhabism were noted in an article published in News Rescue.

== Bibliography ==
Name of Book	In Urdu	Translation	Year of Publication	Content
Rukhsār-e-Riaz	رخسار ریاض	The Face of Riaz	2002	Poetry
Malfoozāt-e-Mehdi	ملفوظات مہدی	Sayings Pertaining to the Mehdi	2002	Educational Book
Dastoor-e-Riaz	دستور ریاض	The Riazian Constitution	2002	Educational Book
Mysterious Horizons – Beyond God	–	–	2007	Educational Book
Nisāb-e-Mehdi	نصاب مہدی	The Chapter of the Mehdi	2010	Educational Book
Imam um Mubeen	امام مّبین	The Elusid Imam	2012	Educational Book
