= Koka and Vikoka =

Generals of Kali in Hindu mythology

Koka (Sanskrit: कोक, romanized: Koka) and Vikoka (Sanskrit: विकोक, romanized: Vikoka) are asura brothers from Hindu literature. They are twin generals who are described to aid the asura Kali in his battle against Kalki, the 10th and final avatar of the god Vishnu, whose coming is believed to herald the end of the age. The story is told in the Kalki Purana.

== Etymology ==
The etymology of Koka's name is obscure, and the Monier-Williams Sanskrit dictionary gives no ready definition; Vikoka's name is formed by adding Vi-, used to form names from other names, to "Koka".

== Legend ==
The prophecy of Kalki and his battle with Kali appears in the Kalki Purana, a collection of predictions concerning when, where and why Kalki will manifest himself and what he will do. According to Hindu cosmology the world will experience four long ages, or yugas, of which the Kali Yuga is the last in a cycle. Kali, the asura-king of the Kali Yuga, will be assisted by his generals, the twin brothers Koka and Vikoka, who will threaten to defeat Kalki by raising themselves from the dead, faster than he can kill them. The god Brahma eventually appears to Kalki and reveals to him that no earthly or celestial weapon can kill the brothers if they are allowed to hold on to one another; the only way Kalki can defeat them is to separate and attack them both simultaneously. Kalki then forces himself between the two and lands crushing blows to each asura's temple at the same time. They both die, this time forever.

The Kalki Purana states that Koka and Vikoka in their previous births were the grandsons of Shakuni and sons of Vrikasura, who are not to be confused with the Shakuni and Vrikasura from the Mahabharata - the former are father and son, whereas the latter are unrelated.

== Source ==
- Kalki Purana ISBN 81-288-0588-6
