= Kali (demon) =

Personification of sin and strife in Hindu mythology

- Personification of Sin
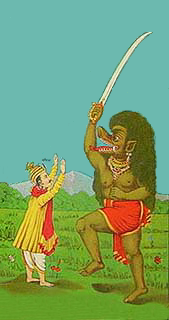
- Depiction of Kali
- Devanagari: कलि/कली
- Sanskrit transliteration: Kali
- Affiliation: Deva-Gandharvas (in Mahabharata); Asura (in Puranas)

Kali (Devanāgari: कलि, IAST: Kali, with both vowels short; from a root kad, 'suffer, hurt, startle, confuse') is the personification of sin which presides over the Kaliyuga, the present era characterized by moral decline and disorder in Hinduism. His origins and role in the cosmic cycle are detailed in various texts, including the Mahābhārata and Bhāgavata Purāṇa.

According to the Mahābhārata, Kali is a sinister deva-gandharva, born as the fifteenth son of the progenitor sage Kashyapa and Munni. As the lord of the Kaliyuga, Kali exerts his influence by promoting sinful acts, confined by King Parikshit to five domains: gambling, drinking, prostitution, murder, and gold. His narrative intertwines with figures like Nala, whom he possessed and tormented, and Duryodhana, considered his incarnation in the Mahābhārata.

Later Puranic texts reinterpret his origins, making him more fearsome and powerful, as well as associating him with personifications of malevolent forces such as Adharma (unrighteousness), Krodha (anger), Himsa (violence), Mithya (falsehood), Durukti (slander), and Alakshmi (misfortune). The Kalki Purāṇa focus on his role as the nemesis of Kalki, the tenth and final avatar of the Hindu preserver deity, Vishnu. At the close of the Kaliyuga, he is prophesied to face Kalki in a climactic battle that will end his reign and restore righteousness, restarting the cycle of four yugas.

== Mahabharata ==
According to the Mahabharata, Kali was born as the fifteenth son of Kashyapa and his wife Muni. Kaśyapa, a prominent sage and progenitor, fathered sixteen sons, among whom Kali was classified as a deva-gandharva (a divine being associated with celestial musicians). His siblings included other gandharvas—Bhīmasena, Ugrasena, Suparṇa, Varuṇa, Dhṛtarāṣṭra, Gopati, Suvarcas, Satyavāk, Arkaparṇa, Prayuta, Viśruta, Citraratha, Śāliśiras, Parjanya, and Nārada.

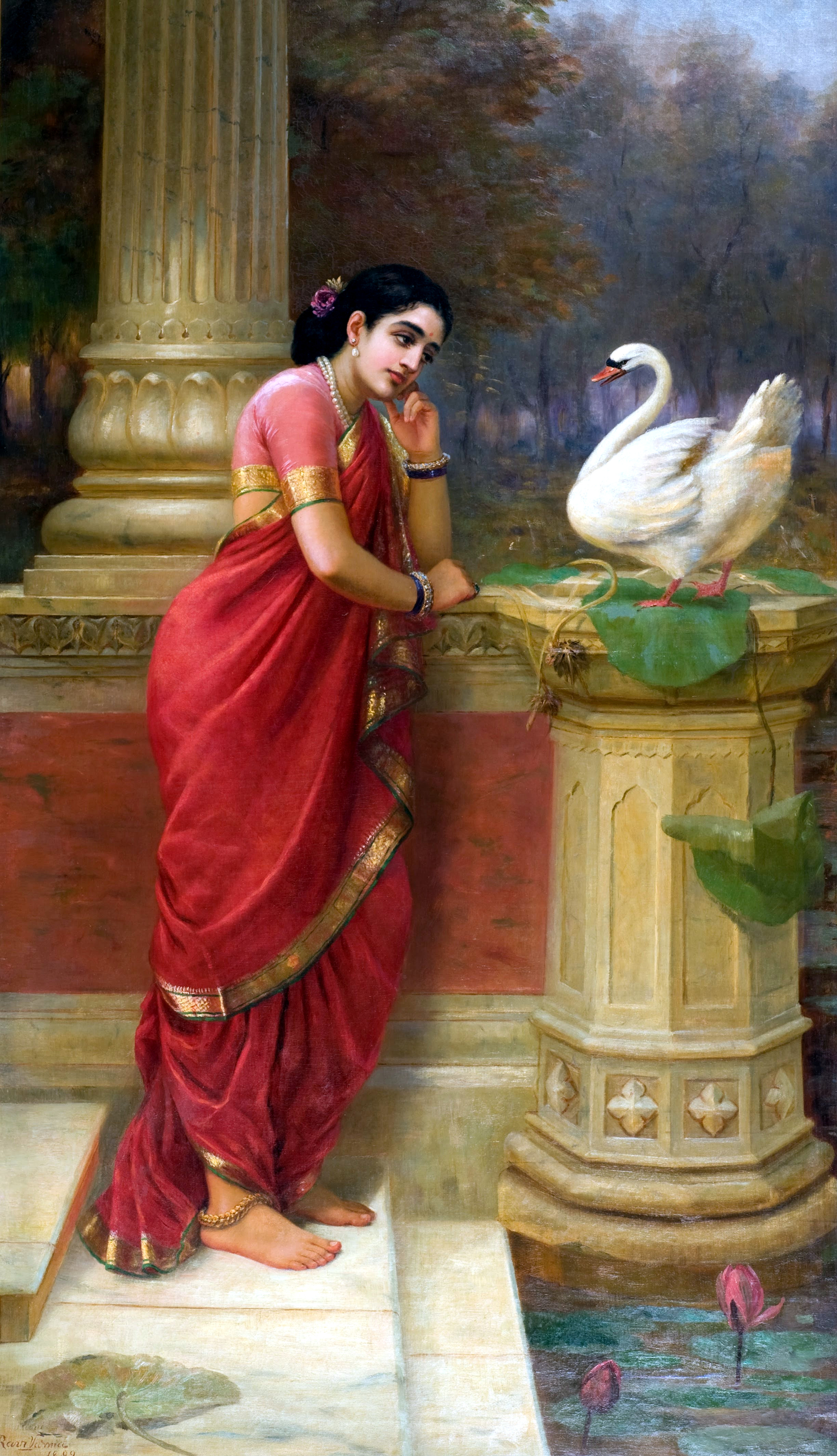
Damayanti speaking with a celestial swan

The gandharva Kali became jealous when he was late to Princess Damayanti's Swayamvara ceremony and discovered she had overlooked the deities Indra, Agni, Varuna, and Yama (and ultimately himself) to choose Nala as her husband. In anger, Kali spoke to his companion Dvapara, the personification of Dvapara Yuga:

I am ill able, O Dvapara, to suppress my anger. I shall possess Nala, deprive him of his kingdom, and he shall no more sport with Bhima's daughter. Entering the dice, it behoveth thee to help me.

Kali travelled to the great Nala's kingdom of Nishadhas and waited twelve long years for the right moment to strike. Because Nala had rendered himself impure by not washing his feet before his prayers, Kali was able to bewitch his soul. Kali then appeared before Pushkara and invited him to play a game of dice with his brother, guaranteeing Nala's downfall. Dvapara took the form of the Vrisha die that would be used in the fixed game. Kali forced Nala to lose and, each time, he would raise the stakes higher despite the protest of his advisors and wife. Finally, Nala lost his kingdom to Pushkara. Both he and Damayanti were exiled to the forest.

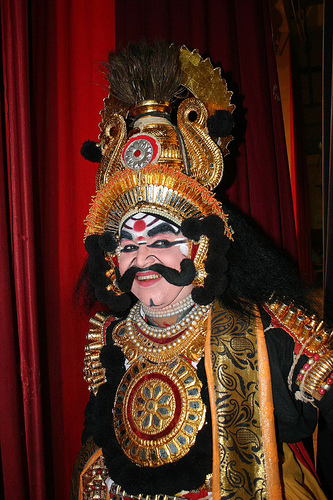
Duryodhana as depicted in Yakshagana, a popular drama from Karnataka

During their exile, Kali drove Nala to abandon Damayanti, who later enacted a curse against everyone that had caused the downfall of her husband. She eventually returned home after a short time as a handmaiden to the Princess of Chedi. Nala, meanwhile, saved the naga Karkotaka from fire (where he was cursed to suffer by sage Narada). Intending to exorcise the devil within him, the serpent bit Nala, injecting him with deadly poisons that forever tortured Kali. The venom also changed Nala into an ugly dwarf named Bahuka. He later became the charioteer of the Ayodhya King Rituparna, who was a master mathematician and dice player.

Years later, King Rituparna revealed to Bahuka the supreme skill of controlling the dice in exchange for horsemanship lessons. This skill awakened Nala from Kali's control and allowed him (with the help of Damayanti's curse and Karkotaka's venom) to exorcise the asura (demon); vomiting him in the form of poison from his mouth. Nala forced Kali's trembling spirit into a Vibhitaka tree. He then counted the fruits of the tree and left in search of his wife and later regained his true form. Kali returned to his abode as well.

Kali was then later incarnated as king Duryodhana, eldest of the one hundred Kaurava brothers. His companion Dvapara became his uncle Shakuni. The day Duryodhana was born, he unleashed a donkey-like scream which the donkeys outside the home replied to. Despite the advice from Vidura to discard the evil baby, Duryodhana's father Dhritarashtra kept the child because of his blind love for his son and overlooked his responsibility as the King.

At the onset of Kali Yuga, once king Parikshit went hunting in the forest. Just then in the middle of the way, Kali appeared before him and asked permission to enter his kingdom, which the king denied. Upon insisting, Parikshit allowed him five places to reside: where there is gambling, alcohol consumption, prostitution, animal slaughter and illicitly acquired gold. Kali smartly entered into Parikshit's golden crown (which Bhima had claimed after killing Jarasandha and had kept in the palace, Parikshit was attracted to the beauty of the crown and started wearing it from then on) and spoiled his thoughts. Parikshit entered the hut of a sage named Shamika as he was thirsty. He found the sage in deep meditation. He bowed to him several times but there was no response. In anger, he took a dead snake and threw it around the sage's neck. Later when the sage's son, Shringin, heard of this incident he cursed the king to die of snake bite on the seventh day. On hearing this, the king forswore the throne for his son Janamejaya and spent his last seven days listening to the discourses of sage Shuka, compiled as the Bhagavata Purana under the banyan tree of Shukratal. As prophesied, the snake king Takshaka bit Parikshita, who left his mortal remains behind and attained Moksha.

== Puranic accounts ==
The Kalki Purana describes him as a huge being, the color of soot, with a large tongue, and a terrible stench. From his birth, he carried an Upasthi (worship) bone. The Kalki Purana says that this asura (demon) chose gambling, liquor, prostitution, slaughter and illicitly obtained gold as his permanent abodes. The Sanskrit-English Dictionary states Kali is "of a class of mythic beings (related to the Gandharvas, and supposed by some to be fond of gambling)". The Bhagavata Purana describes Kali as wearing the garments of a king and portrays him as a brownish-skinned asura (demon) with a dog-like face, protruding fangs, pointed ears and long green bushy hair, wearing a red loin cloth and golden jewelry.

=== Markandeya Purana ===
According to Markandeya Purana, the Brahmin Pravara was given a magical ointment that allowed him to fly. But when he flew to the Himalayas, the ointment was washed away from the bottoms of his feet keeping him from returning home to his wife. During this time, the nymph Varuthini fell madly in love with him and begged the Brahmin to stay with her forever. But eventually, he rejected her. He prayed to Agni who returned him home safely.

The gandharva Kali was in love with ‘‘Varuthini’’ and had been rejected by her in the past. He saw how she hungered for the Brahmin, so he took on the appearance of Pravara and came before the courtesan. He led her into the bedchamber and told her to close her eyes during their sex [sambhoga]. As they made love, Varuthini noticed that his body became flaming hot and believed it was because his Brahmin spirit was infused with the sacrificial fire. After climax, Kali, still-as-Pravara, left the apsara and returned to his abode. Varuthini soon became pregnant and nine months later gave birth to a human child that not only looked like the Brahmin but possessed his soul as well. The authors of the book Science in Culture comment this was an example of the Sanskrit phrase "from his semen and from her thinking," meaning the child was indeed Pravara's child because she believed it was his.

In another version, Kali stipulates that he would only marry the apsara if she keeps her eyes closed while they are in the forest (presumably having sex). However, Kali leaves after their marriage and the birth of their son Svarocisa. Svarocisa grows up to become a very learned scholar of the Vedas and learns to speak the languages of all creatures from one of his three wives. He later marries a goddess and fathers Svarocisa Manu, one of the progenitors of mankind.

=== Bhagavata Purana ===
The Bhagavata Purana states the very day and moment avatar Krishna left this earth, Kali, "who promotes all kinds of irreligious activities", came into this world.

After setting off to wage war against the evils of the world with his armies, Emperor Parikshit, the grandson of Arjuna, came across a Sudra dressed as a king who was beating a cow and an ox with a club. Parikshit immediately led his chariot over to the scene and angrily berated the sudra for abusing the sacred cow and her mate. However, this was no ordinary sudra and these were no ordinary bovine, for the sudra was Kali and the cow and ox were embodiments of the earth goddess and Dharma. The Emperor noticed the ox was standing on one of his legs because the other three had been broken by Kali. Dharma explained his four legs represented "austerity, cleanliness, mercy and truthfulness", but he had only the leg of "truth" to stand on since the other three had been broken by Kali over the preceding yugas. Kali was intent on breaking all the legs that supported the reign of dharma so he could effect the expansion of his own dark reign on earth. The earth goddess cried for she had once been plentiful, but when Krishna ascended to heaven, she was forsaken and all of the prosperity left from the world. She feared evil kings like Kali would continue to lay waste to the earth.

When Parikshit raised his sword to kill Kali, the sudra stripped himself of his royal garments and prostrated himself at the emperor's feet. The emperor knew Kali tainted the world with his evil and so had no place in it and raised his sword once more. But Kali interceded again and begged the emperor to spare his life and allow him a place to live within his empire. Parikshit decided that Kali would live in "gambling houses, in taverns, in women and men of unchaste lives, in slaughtering places and in gold". And as long as Parikshit ruled India, Kali stayed within the confines of these five places. This act allowed Dharma to regain his legs and the earth to be relieved of much burden. However, Parikshit was later cursed to die by snake bite after hunting in the forest and throwing a dead snake on an unresponsive sage practicing austerities. Upon the emperor's death, "Kali made his way to other places like wild fire and established his power throughout the length and breadth of the whole world."

In another version of the tale, Kali enters into the Emperor's crown when Parikshit gives him permission to reside wherever there is gold. Upon returning home after offending the sage, Parikshit says to himself, Kali Yuga's abode is in gold; this was on my head; hence I had so evil a thought that, having taken a dead snake cast it on the sage’s neck. Therefore, I now understand that Kali Yuga has taken his revenge on me. How shall I escape this grievous sin?"

=== Vamana Purana ===
Vamana Purana states that during Bali's rule (before Vishnu's incarnation as Vamana), all the people were very righteous, causing Kali to lose his influence. He told Brahma about this and asked him for a solution. Thereafter, Kali went to the forest of Vibhitaka and the Satya Yuga began following Kali Yuga's downfall.

=== Kalki Purana ===
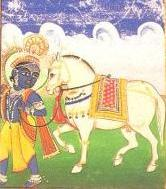
Kalki

The beginning of the Kalki Purana describes Kali's lineage starting with the Brahma, his great-great-grandfather, and ending with the birth of his grandchildren. Instead of being born of poison from the churning of the ocean of milk, he is the product of a long line of incestuous monsters born from Brahma's back. (See Family Lineage below) Kali and his family were created by Brahma to hurry the dissolution of the cosmos after the pralaya period was over. When his family takes human form on earth, they further taint the hearts and minds of mankind to bring about the end of Dvapara Yuga and the beginning of Kali Yuga. During the first stage of Kali Yuga, the varnashrama breaks down and God-worship is forsaken by man. All through the second, third, and fourth stages, man forgets the name of god and no longer offers yajna (offerings) to the devas. It is at this point when Vishnu reincarnates as Kalki in the name of the devas and all of mankind to rid the cosmos of Kali's dark influence.

The remainder of the tale describes Kalki's childhood, military training under the immortal Parashurama and assisting, training and teaching Kalki on Dharma, Karma, Artha and knowledge of most ancient and necessary wisdom with military and social perspective but also help, support and join his fight against evils as greater guidance, his marriage, his preparation for war against the asura Kali, and the decisive war between the two. Kalki kicks off his campaign by performing the Ashvamedha sacrifice and leading his armies behind the horse as it runs freely from kingdom to kingdom. If any evil king tries to stop the horse, Kalki engages them in combat. After defeating them, he continues to follow the horse until all evil kingdoms are vanquished. When Kali finally faces Kalki's forces, his entire family blood line is wiped out by the avatar's generals and he presumably dies from wounds inflicted by Dharma and Satya Yuga personified. Kalki, meanwhile, battles and simultaneously kills the asura's most powerful generals, Koka and Vikoka, twin devils adept in the dark arts.

==== Churning of the ocean of milk ====
According to a lesser known Madhva version of the legend, during the churning of the ocean of milk, a great poison known as halahala was produced, which Vayu, the god of wind, rubbed in his hands to reduce its potency. Then a small portion was given to god Shiva, turning his throat blue. The rest was collected in a golden vessel and digested by Vayu. (One source states he drank the Kalakuta poison of Vasuki nāga. Still others more commonly state that Shiva drank alone.) A little portion of poison that wasn't swallowed by Shiva became the body of Kali. From this poison also came, "cruel objects like snakes, wolves, and tigers."

Later, when the asura Rahu was decapitated by Vishnu's Mohini avatar, the demon's allies attacked her and all except Kali were killed. Having the power to possess the bodies of immortal and mortal beings, he entered the hearts of man and escaped, using the men he possessed to corrupt the primordial scriptures by deliberately miswriting them, generating widespread chaos. Because Kali was "invisible, unimaginable, and present in all" the only way to correct the chaos born from the miswritten texts was to completely renew the sacred scriptures entirely. Thus Vishnu descended to earth as Vyasa, the compiler of the sacred scriptures Vedas and the writer of the Puranas.

==== Death ====
Kali dies one-third of the way through the Kalki Purana. During the decisive battle between Kali and Kalki's armies, Kali tried to face both Dharma and Satya Yuga personified, but was overwhelmed and fled on his donkey because his chariot had been destroyed, leaving his owl-charged war flag to be trampled on the battlefield. Kali retreated to the citadel of his capital city of Vishasha where he discovered his body had been mortally stabbed and burned during his battle with the two devas. The stench of his blood billowed out and filled the atmosphere with a foul odor. When Dharma and Satya burst into the city, Kali tried to run away, but, knowing his family had been destroyed, coupled with his grievous wounds, he "entered his unmanifested years". This might lead some to believe he died, but one version of the Kalki Purana in the book The Origins of Evil in Hindu Mythology states Kali does not die but, instead, escapes through time and space to live in the Kali Yuga of the next kalpa. The author comments, "Unlike most battles between devas and asuras, however, this apparent victory is immediately undercut, for Kali escapes to reappear in 'another age'—in our age, or the next Kali Age." Since he had the power to manifest himself in human form on earth, he was able to forsake his dying corporeal form to escape in spirit.

=== Family lineage ===
In Kalki Purana, Kali is the great-great-grandson of Brahma. He is the son of Krodha (Anger) and his sister-turned-wife Himsa (Violence). He is the grandson of Dambha (Vanity) and his sister Maya (Illusion). He is the great-grandson of Adharma (Impropriety) and his wife, Mithya (Falsehood). Adharma was originally created from Brahma's back as a malina pataka (a very dark and deadly sinful object).

B. K. Chaturvedi, a modern translator of the Kalki Purana, states in a footnote that the growth of this dark sinful object into Adharma seems to "convey the growth of Kali Yuga and its obnoxious offshoots."

==== Vishnu Purana ====
Kali's family lineage is told differently in the Vishnu Purana, which is a father purana to the Kalki Purana:

The wife of Adharma (vice) was Himsá (violence), on whom he begot a son Anrita (falsehood), and a daughter Nikriti (immorality): they intermarried, and had two sons, Bhaya (fear) and Naraka (hell); and twins to them, two daughters, Maya (deceit) and Vedaná (grief), who became their wives. The son of Bhaya and Máyá was the destroyer of living creatures, or Mrityu (death); and Dukha (pain) was the offspring of Naraka and Vedaná. The children of Mrityu were Vyádhi (disease), Jará (decay), Soka (sorrow), Trishńa (greediness), and Krodha (wrath). These are all called the inflictors of misery, and are characterised as the progeny of Vice (Adharma). They are all without wives, without posterity, without the faculty to procreate; they are the terrible forms of Vishńu, and perpetually operate as causes of the destruction of this world. On the contrary, Daksha and the other rishis, the elders of mankind, tend perpetually to influence its renovation; whilst the Manus and their sons, the heroes endowed with mighty power, and treading in the path of truth, constantly contribute to its preservation.

In this version, Himsa is Adharma's wife instead of his granddaughter.

==== Bhagavata Purana ====
According to the Bhagavata Purana, Adharma is the husband of Mrishá (falsehood), and the father of Dambha (hypocrisy) and Máyá (deceit), who were adopted by Nirritti (Hindu goddess of misery). The series of their descendants is also somewhat varied from our text; being in each descent, however, twins which intermarry, or Lobha (covetousness) and Nikriti, who produce Krodha (wrath) and Hinsá: their children are, Kali (wickedness) and Durukti (evil speech): their progeny are, Mrityu (death) and Bhí (fear); whose offspring are, Niraya (hell) and Yátaná (torment).

In this version, Mrisha is the wife of Adharma and not Himsa or Mithya.

==== Linga Purana ====
The Linga Purana enumerates Adharma among the Prajapatis (Lords of Creatures).

==== Dharma personified ====
Since Dharma is one of the major antagonists of Kali, this personified deity has his own line of offspring that work against the asura and his family to bring balance to the world. The following comes from the Vishnu Purana:

The progeny of Dharma by the daughters of Daksha were as follows: by Shraddha he had Kama (desire); by Lakshmi, Darpa (pride); by Dhriti, Niyama (precept); by Tushti, Santosha (content); by Pushti, Lobha (cupidity); by Medhá, Sruta (sacred tradition); by Kriya, Danda, Naya, and Vinaya (correction, polity, and prudence); by Buddhi, Bodha (understanding); by Lajja, Vinaya (good behaviour); by Vapu, Vyavasaya (perseverance). Santi gave birth to Kshema (prosperity); Siddhi to Sukha (enjoyment); and Kírtti to Yasas. These were the sons of Dharma; one of whom, Kama, had Harsha (joy) by his wife Nandi (delight).

Again, the Bhagavata Purana gives a different account of his children's names.

It is described in Mahabharata as the eldest Pandava brother, Yudhishthira was the son of Dharma.

==== Progeny ====
Kali's sister-turned-wife, Durukti (Calumny), gave him two offspring: a son named Bhayanaka (Fear) and a daughter named Mrityu (Death). His son and daughter gave him two grandchildren: a boy named Naraka (Hell) and a girl named Yatana (Torture). Again, there are some discrepancies here. The Vishnu Purana says Mrityu and Bhayanak are his brother and sister. Mrityu is even represented as male instead of female.

Kali is the grandfather of Svarocisa Manu, one of the progenitors of mankind. As previously mentioned, Kali had a son named Svarocisa with the Apsara Varuthini. Svarocisa once traveld to Mt. Mandara and was met by Manorama, a cursed-woman being chased by an asura. In the past, she had made fun of a sage practicing Tapasya austerities on Mt. Kailas and was cursed to be captured by an asura. When her friends Vibhavari and Kalavati berated the sage for enacting a curse for such a minor offence, he cursed one to be a leper and the other a carrier of diseases. Manorama had knowledge of a powerful spiritual weapon, but did not know how to wield it, so she taught it to Svarocisa. When the asura leaped out of the forest and grabbed ahold of the woman, Svarocis called forth the weapon. But the asura stayed his hand and explained he was actually Manorama's father, Indivara. He had also been cursed to become an asura by the sage Brahmamitra because he tried to covertly obtain the secrets of Ayurveda medicine without the sage's knowledge. The sage told him that the curse would end when he was about to eat his own daughter. Once he regained his true form, Indivara taught Svarocisa the Ayurveda medication, which he used to cure Manorama's friends. He later married the three and had three sons with them. He learned the languages of all creatures from Vibhavari and the Padmini vidya from Kalavati.

Despite his prosperity, Svarocis was unhappy in his life and could hear the ducks and deer talking about him behind his back. One day he went hunting and took aim at a boar, but a deer came through the clearing and asked to be shot in its place. When he enquired why, the deer told him that she was really the goddess of the forest and wished to marry Svarocisa. So he embraced the deer and she turned into a beautiful woman. Together, they had a son named Dyutiman, who later became the Svarocisa Manu.

One source states, "Kali's wife Alakshmi and her sons who supervise evil also came from Kshirasagara [the ocean of milk]." Alakshmi is the elderly twin sister of the Goddess Lakshmi, the consort of Vishnu. Since the Kalki Purana states his wife Durukti is his sister, Alakshmi would be a second wife because she is not directly related to him.

There are a number of connections and similarities between Kali and Alakshmi. First and foremost, Alakshmi's sister is the consort of Vishnu, who sent his Kalki avatar to earth to defeat Kali. Second, legends say she was born either from the churning of the ocean of milk, the poison from Vasuki (who helped churn the ocean) or the back of Prajapati. As previously mentioned, Kali is said to have been born from the halahala poison created from churning the ocean or from a lineage created from Brahma’s back. Third, Alakshmi takes the form of an owl. Kali's emblem on his war flag is of an owl. Fourth, whenever Alakshmi enters a house, families fight and turn on one another. The presence of Kali and his family on earth causes mankind to fight and turn on one another. Finally, Alakshmi is said to ride a donkey. Kali also rides a donkey in the Kalki Purana.

== Contemporary representation ==
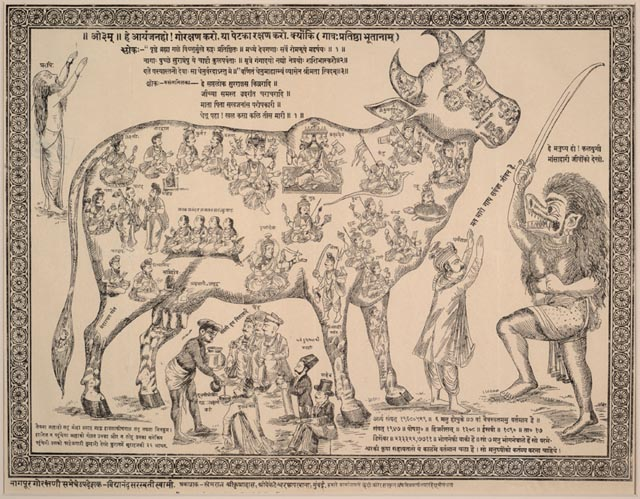
Anti-beef eating pamphlet (1890 CE) showing Kali (far right) attempting to slaughter a sacred cow

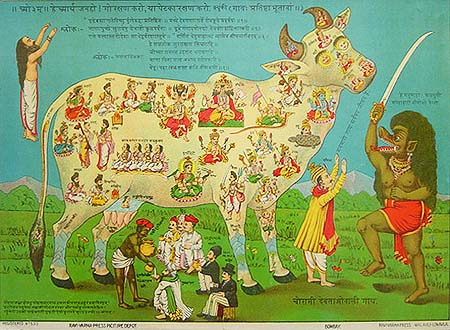
The color version run by the Ravi Varma Press (c. 1912)

Kali's image was used in several pamphlets circulated by various Agorakshanasabh ("cow protection leagues") and "wandering ascetics" as a protest against the Muslim practice of beef-eating during the British Raj]. These pamphlets were produced in a time when Hindu-Muslim riots over cow slaughter occurred in several areas of India; including Azamgarh district (1893), when a total of 100 people died in similar conflagrations throughout the empire; Ayodhya (1912–1913); and Shahabad (1917). One such pamphlet entitled "The Present State" showed a cow being slaughtered by a trio of "Muhammadan" butchers. Another portrayed Kali raising a sword above the head of a sacred cow, whose body was illustrated to be a microcosmic paradise in which all the Hindu gods resided. There were many different editions of this version. For instance, one showed a woman labeled "The Hindu" waiting with bowl-in-hand for the cow's calf to finish suckling before she could get milk. A form of Krishna labeled Dharmaraj ("Ruler of Dharma") stood behind the cow and Kali was, again, harassing her with his sword. Still, a different one deleted the woman and calf and instead portrayed Dharmaraj in front of the cow pleading mat maro gay sarv ka jivan hai ("don't kill the cow, everyone is dependent on it"), while Kali rebuts he manusyaho! Kaliyugi Mansahari jivom ko dekho ("mankind, look at the meat-eating souls of the Kali Yuga").

Some Hindus considered Kali's presence in the picture to be a representation of the Muslim community. When one of the versions of these pamphlets came into the possession of a state official in 1893, he commented that the image "contained a representation of a Musalman [Muslim] advancing to slay the cow ...". One book states, "The Magistrate [at Deoria] found Muhammadans excited because they heard a picture was in circulation representing a Muhammadan with a sword drawn sacrificing a cow, and this they considered an insult." In 1915, a color version of this picture run by the Ravi Varma Press caught the attention of the colonial censors and was presumably censored in some way.

== In popular culture ==
Nala Damayanti (1921): This big-budget film depicts a famous episode from the Mahabharata, starting with Narada's ascent of Mount Meru. It shows Swarga, the Heaven of Indra, the transformation in the clouds of the Four Gods into impersonations of King Nala, the Swan Messengers of Love, the transformation of Kali into a serpent, and the meeting of Kali and Dwarpa and the Four Gods amidst the Blue Air.

To differentiate him from the goddess Kali, the asura Kali is sometimes referred to as "Kalipurush" (Kali the being), pairing the name with Purusha.

=== Film ===
Films	Played by
Nala Damayanti (1921 film)	Khorshedji Bilimoria
Nal Damayanti (1988)	Nalin Dave

=== Television ===
Television serial	Played by
Krishna (TV series)	Pramod Kapoor as Kali (cameo appearance)
Namah Lakshmi Narayan	Raviz Thakur as Kali

== See also ==
- Antichrist
- Dajjal
