= Kalki =

Tenth and final avatar of Hindu deity Vishnu

- Member of Dashavatara
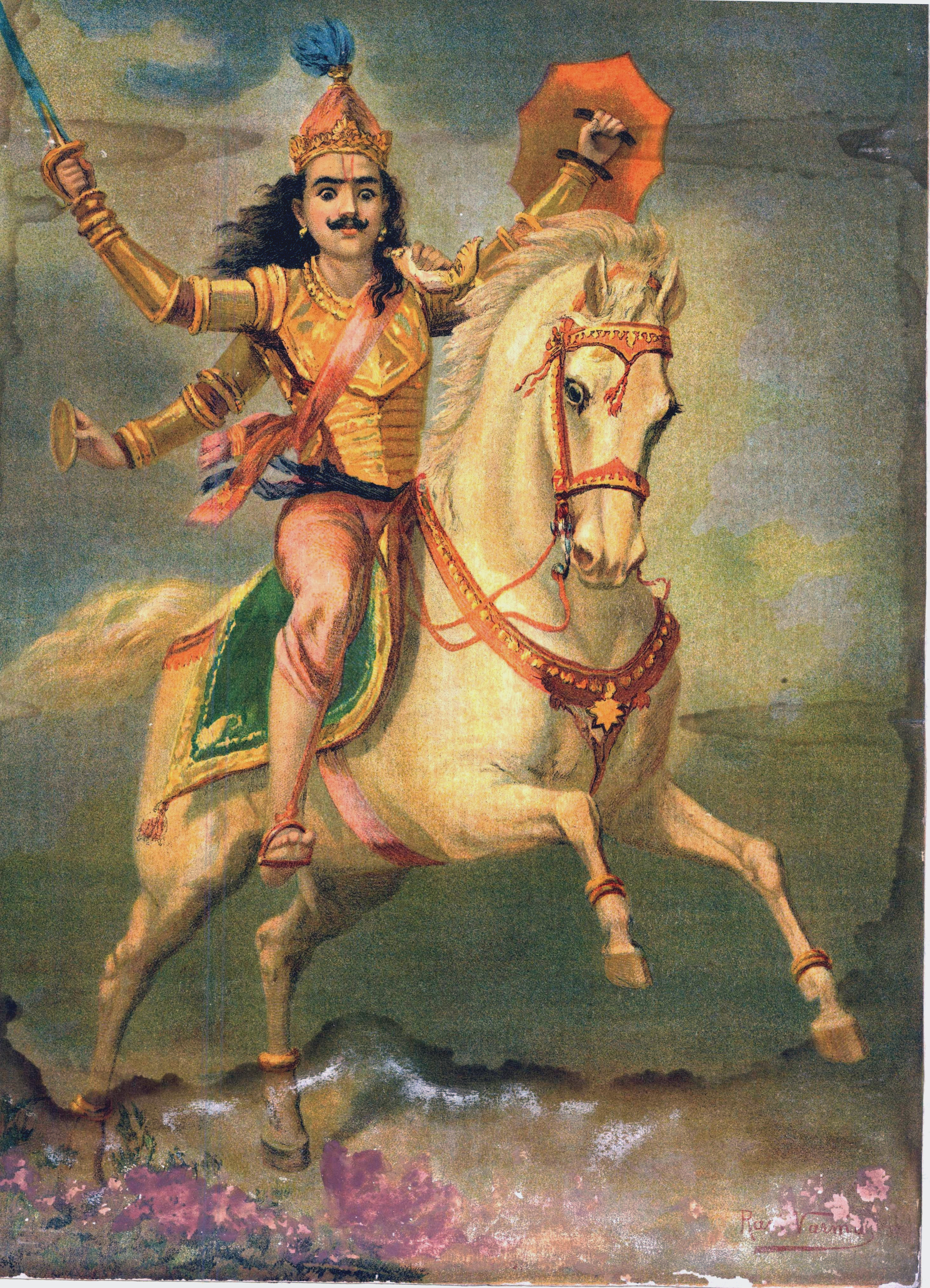
- Kalki by Raja Ravi Varma
- Affiliation: Vaishnavism
- Weapon: Nandaka or Ratnamaru (Sword) Bow and Arrows; Brahmastra; Varunastra; Agneyastra; Garudastra; Vayavyastra
- Mount: Horse
- Festivals: Kalki Jayanti

Genealogy
- Parents: Vishnuyashas (father), Sumati (mother)
- Spouse: Padmavati and Ramā Vaishno Devi (in regional traditions)
- Children: Jaya and Vijaya (From Padmavati) (Upapuranas) Meghamala and Balahaka (From Rama) (Kalki Purana)

Dashavatara Sequence
- Predecessor: Buddha

Kalki (Sanskrit: कल्कि), also called Kalkin, is the prophesied tenth and final incarnation of the Hindu god Vishnu. According to Vaishnava cosmology, Kalki is destined to appear at the end of the Kali Yuga, the last of the four ages in the cycle of existence (Krita). His arrival will mark the end of the Kali Yuga and herald the beginning of the Satya Yuga, the most virtuous age, before the ultimate dissolution of the universe (Mahapralaya).

In the Puranas, Kalki is depicted as the avatar who will rejuvenate existence by ending the darkest period of adharma (unrighteousness) and restoring dharma (righteousness). He is described as riding a white horse named Devadatta and wielding a fiery sword. The portrayal of Kalki varies across different Puranas, and his narrative is also found in other traditions, including the Kalachakra-Tantra of Tibetan Buddhism and Sikh texts.

== Etymology ==
The name Kalki is derived from Kal, which means "time" (Kali Yuga). The original term may have been Karki (white, from the horse) which morphed into Kalki. This proposal is supported by two versions of Mahabharata manuscripts (e.g. the G3.6 manuscript) that have been found, where the Sanskrit verses name the incarnation to be Karki.

== Description ==
=== Hindu texts ===
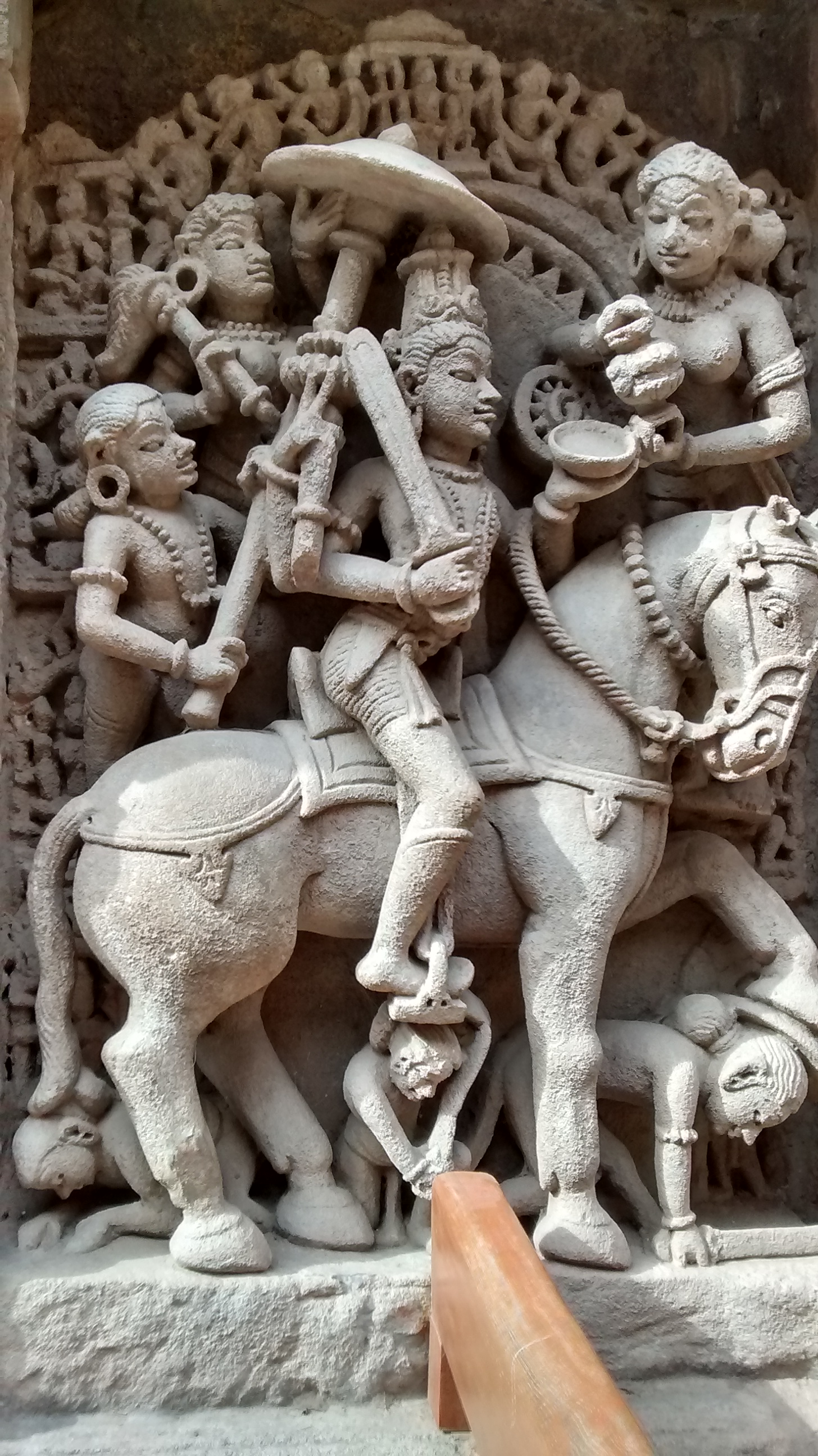
Statue of Kalki's incarnation on a wall of Rani Ki Vav (The Queen's Stepwell) at Patan, Gujarat, India

Kalki is an avatara of Vishnu. Avatar means "descent", and refers to a descent of the divine into the material realm of human existence. Kalki appears for the first time in the Mahabharata.

The Garuda Purana lists ten incarnations, with Kalki being the final one. He is described as the incarnation who appears at the end of the Kali Yuga. He ends the darkest, degenerating, and chaotic stage of the Kali Yuga to remove adharma and ushers in the Satya Yuga, while riding a white horse with a fiery sword. He restarts a new cycle of time. He is described as a Brahmin warrior in the Puranas. It is mentioned in the Puranas that the immortal Chiranjivis will assist him in various stages of his life.

A minor text named Kalki Purana is a relatively recent text, likely composed in Bengal. Its dating floruit is the 18th-century. Wendy Doniger dates the Kalki Purana to between 1500 and 1700 CE.

In the Kalki Purana, Kalki is born into the family of Vishnuyashas and Sumati, in a village called Shambala, on the thirteenth day during the fortnight of the waxing moon. At a young age, he is taught the holy scriptures on topics such as dharma, karma, artha, jñāna, and undertakes military training under the care of the Parashurama (the sixth incarnation of Vishnu). Soon, Kalki worships Shiva, who gets pleased by the devotion and provides him in return a divine white horse named Devadatta (a manifestation of Garuda), a powerful sword, whereby its handle is bedecked with jewels, and a parrot named Shuka, who is an all-knower; the past, the present and the future. Other accessories are also given by other devas, devis, saints, and righteous kings. He fights an evil army and in many wars, ending evil, but does not end existence. Kalki returns to Shambala, inaugurates a new Yuga for the good, and then goes to Vaikuntha. In the Kalki Purana, there is a mention of a Buddhist city whose residents don't adhere to dharma (not worshipping the devas, ancestors, and not upholding the varna system), which Kalki fights and conquers.

The Agni Purana describes Kalki's role:

Kalki, as the son of Viṣṇuyaśas, (and having) Yājñavalkya as the priest would destroy the non-Aryans, holding the astra (weapon) and having a weapon. He would establish moral law in four-fold varṇas in the suitable manner. The people (would be) in the path of righteousness in all the stages of life.

— Agni Purana, Chapter 16, Verses 8 - 9

The Devi Bhagavata Purana features the devas hailing Vishnu, invoking his Kalki avatara:

When almost all the persons in this world will turn out in future as Mleccas and when the wicked Kings will oppress them, right and left, Thou wilt then incarnate Thyself again as Kalki and redress all the grievances! We bow down to Thy Kalki Form! O Deva!

— Devi Bhagavata Purana, Chapter 5

=== Buddhist texts ===
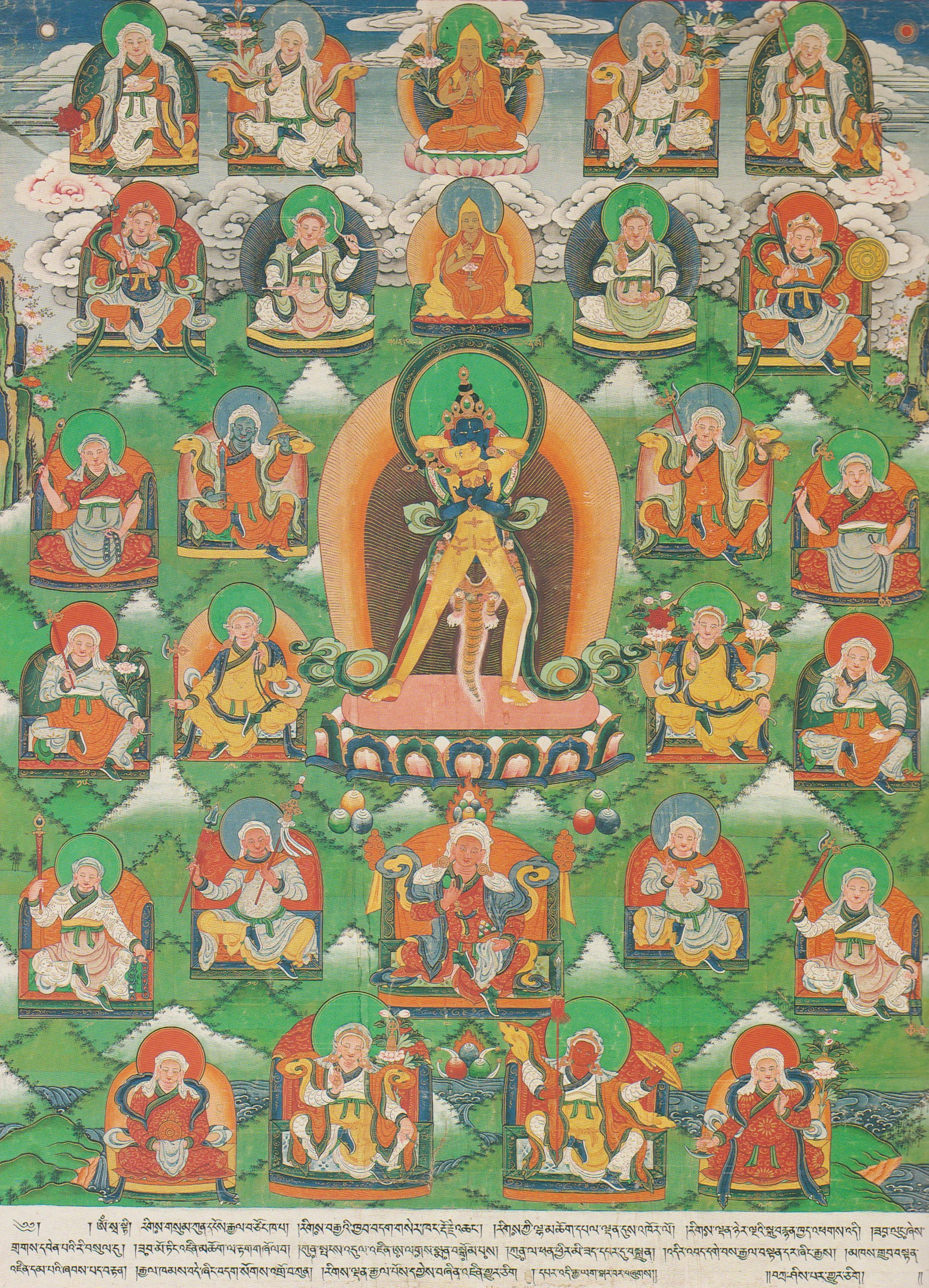
The central figure is a Yidam, a meditation deity. The 25 seated figures represent the 25 Kings Of Shambhala. The middle figure in the top row represents Tsongkhapa, who is in the top two middle rows. This comes from the scriptures that is part of the Indo-Tibetan Vajrayana Buddhist Tradition.

In the Buddhist Text Kalachakra Tantra, the righteous kings are called Kalki (Kalkin, lit. chieftain) living in Sammu. There are many Kalki in this text, each fighting barbarism, persecution and chaos. The last Kalki is called "Rudra Cakrin" and is predicted to end the chaos and degeneration by assembling a large army to eradicate a barbarian army. A great war, which will include an army of both Hindus and Buddhists, will destroy the barbaric forces, states the text. This is most likely borrowed from Hinduism to Buddhism due to the arrival of Islamic kingdoms from the west to the east, mainly settled in West Tibet, Central Asia and the Indian Subcontinent. According to Donald Lopez – a professor of Buddhist Studies, Kalki is predicted to start the new cycle of perfect era where "Buddhism will flourish, people will live long, happy lives and righteousness will reign supreme". The text is significant in establishing the chronology of the Kalki idea to be from post-7th century, probably the 9th or 10th century. Lopez states that the Buddhist text likely borrowed it from Hindu vedic texts. Other scholars, such as Yijiu Jin, state that the text originated in Central Asia in the 10th-century, and Tibetan literature picked up a version of it in India around 1027 CE.

=== Sikh texts ===
The Kalki incarnation appears in the historic Sikh Texts, most notably in Dasam Granth, a text that is traditionally attributed to Guru Gobind Singh. The Chaubis Avatar (24 incarnations) section mentions Sage Matsyanra describing the appearance of Vishnu incarnations to fight evil, greed, violence and ignorance. It includes Kalki as the twenty-fourth incarnation to lead the war between the forces of righteousness and unrighteousness.

=== Regional traditions ===
According to the traditional narrative of the shrine, the goddess was originally a maiden named Trikuta, who is considered an incarnation of Tridevi, During the Treta Yuga, she performed intense penance to win the avatar Rama as her husband. Because Rama was already devoted to his wife Sita, he declined but promised to marry Vaishno Devi during his future incarnation as Kalki in the Kali Yuga. According to this belief, Vaishno Devi currently resides in the cave on Trikuta mountain, where she awaits Kalki's arrival.

== Development ==
While there is no mention of Kalki in the Vedic literature, the epithet "Kalmallkinam", meaning "Brilliant Remover Of Darkness", is found in the Vedic Literature for Rudra (later Shiva), has been interpreted to be "Forerunner Of Kalki".

Kalki appears for the first time in the great war epic Mahabharata. The mention of Kalki in the Mahabharata occurs only once, over the verses 3.188.85–3.189.6. The Kalki incarnation is found in the Maha Puranas such as Vishnu Purana, Matsya Purana, and the Bhagavata Purana. However, the details relating the Kalki mythologies are divergent between the epic and the Puranas, as well as within the Puranas.

In the Mahabharata, according to Hiltebeitel, Kalki is an extension of the Parashurama incarnation legend, where a Brahmin warrior destroys Kshatriyas who were abusing their power to spread chaos, evil, and the persecution of the powerless. The epic character of Kalki restores dharma, restores justice in the world, but does not end the cycle of existence. The Kalkin section in the Mahabharata is present in the Markandeya section. There, states Luis Reimann, can "hardly be any doubt that the Markandeya section is a late addition to the epic. Making Yudhishthira ask a question about conditions at the end of Kali and the beginning of Krta — something far removed from his own situation — is merely a device for justifying the inclusion of this subject matter in the epic."

According to Cornelia Dimmitt, the "clear and tidy" systematization of Kalki and the remaining nine incarnations of Vishnu is not found in any of the Maha Puranas. The coverage of Kalki in these Hindu texts is scant, in contrast to the legends of Matsya, Kurma, Varaha, Vamana, Narasimha, and Krishna, all of whom are repeatedly and extensively described. According to Dimmitt, this was likely because just like the concept of the Buddha as a Vishnu Incarnation, the concept of Kalki was "somewhat in flux" when the major Puranas were being compiled.

This Kalki concept may have further developed in the Hindu texts both as a reaction to the invasions of the Indian subcontinent by various armies over the centuries from its northwest, and in reaction to the mythologies these invaders brought with them. Similarly, the Buddhist Literature dated to the late 1st millennium, a future Buddha Maitreya is depicted as Kalki. According to John Mitchiner, the Kalki concept owes "in some measure" to Jewish, Christian, Zoroastrian and other concepts. Mitchiner states that some Puranas such as the Yuga Purana do not mention Kalki and offer a different cosmology than the other Puranas. The Yuga Purana mythologizes in greater details the post-Maurya era Indo-Greek and Saka era, while the Manvantara theme containing the Kalki idea is mythologized greater in other Puranas. Luis Gonzales-Reimann concurs with Mitchiner, stating that the Yuga Purana does not mention Kalki. In other texts such as the sections 2.36 and 2.37 of the Vayu Purana, states Reimann, it is not Kalkin who ends the Kali Yuga, but a different character named Pramiti. Most historians, states Arvind Sharma, link the development of Kalki mythology in Hinduism to the suffering caused by foreign invasions. Unlike other messianic concepts, Kalki's purpose is to destroy the invaders and heretics in order to reverse the current age Kali Yuga, the age of evil.

=== Predictions about birth and arrival ===
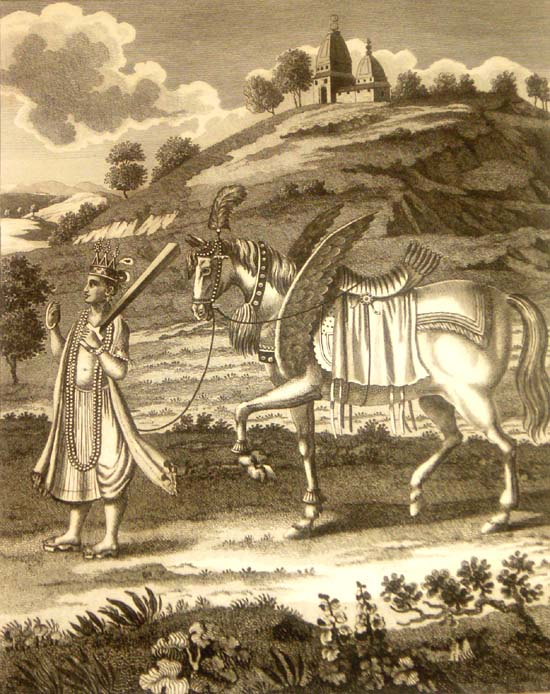
Kalki and Devadatta

In the Cyclic Concept Of Time (Puranic Kalpa), Kali Yuga is estimated to last 432,000 years. In some Vaishnava texts, Kalki is foretold to appear on a white horse on the day of pralaya to end Kali Yuga, to end the evil and wickedness, and to recreate the world anew along with A New Cycle Of Time (Yuga).

Kalki's description varies with manuscripts. Some state Kalki will be born to Awejsirdenee and Bishenjun, others in the family of Sumati and Vishnuyasha. In Buddhist manuscripts, Vishnuyasha is stated to be a prominent headman of the village called Shambhala. He will become the king, a "Turner Of The Wheel", and one who triumphs. He will eliminate all barbarians and robbers, end adharma, restart dharma, and save the good people. After that, humanity will be transformed and the golden age will begin state the Hindu manuscripts.

In the Kanchipuram temple, two relief Puranic panels depict Kalki, one relating to lunar (moon-based) dynasty as mother of Kalki and another to solar (sun-based) dynasty as father of Kalki. In these panels, states D.D. Hudson, the story depicted is in terms of Kalki fighting and defeating asura Kali. He rides a white horse called Devadatta, ends evil, purifies everyone's minds and consciousness, and heralds the start of Satya Yuga.

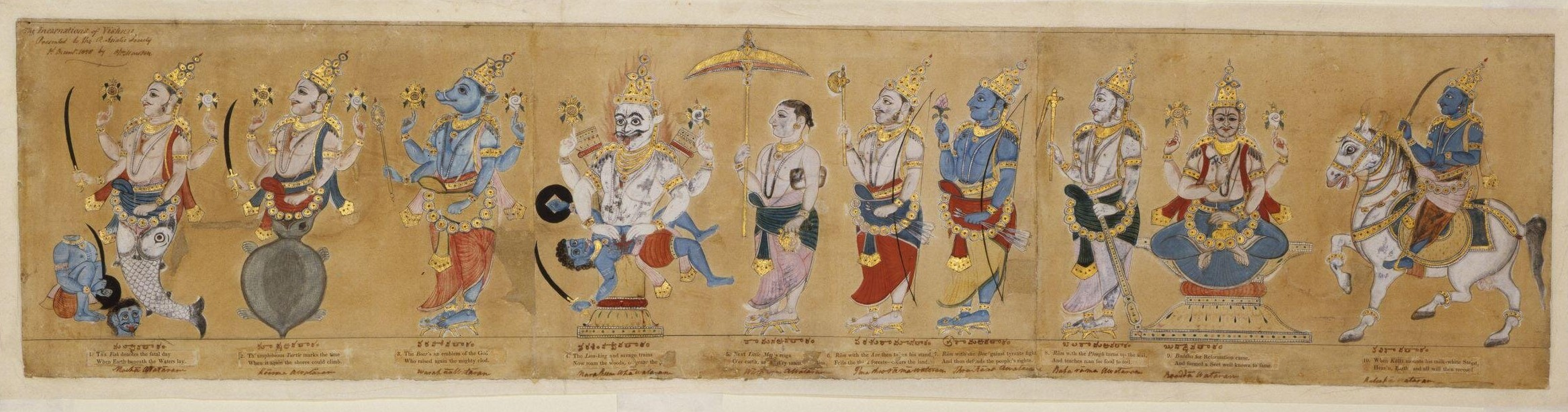
19th-century Dashavatara painting (from left): Matsya, Kurma, Varaha, Narasimha, Vamana, Parashurama, Rama, Krishna, Buddha, and Kalki.

== People who claimed to be Kalki ==
- Mirza Ghulam Ahmad, founder of the Ahmadiyya movement, claimed to be the Kalki Avatar, as well as the Mahdi.
- In the Baháʼí Faith, Baháʼu'lláh is identified as Kalki as well as the prophesied redeeming messenger of God at the end of the world, as claimed in the Bábí religion, Judaism (Mashiach), Christianity (Messiah), Islam (Masih and Mahdi), Buddhism (Maitreya), Zoroastrianism (Shah Bahram), and other religions.
- Kalki Bhagawan, born Vijaykumar Naidu, born on 7 March 1949, founder of Oneness University.
- Samael Aun Weor, founder of the Universal Christian Gnostic Movement.
- Riaz Ahmed Gohar Shahi of Kalki Avatar Foundation.

== See also ==
- Dashavatara
- Eschatology
- Kali
- Kalki (novel)
- Koka and Vikoka
- Lord of Light
- Mahabharata
- Mahdi
- Maitreya
- Paraclete
- Ramayana
- Second Coming
- Suchandra

== Sources ==
- Dalal, Rosen (2014). Hinduism: An aAlphabetical guide. Penguin. ISBN 978-8184752779.
- Dimmitt, Cornelia; van Buitenen, J. A. B. (2012) [1977]. Classical Hindu Mythology: A Reader in the Sanskrit Puranas. Temple University Press. ISBN 978-1-4399-0464-0.
- Rocher, Ludo (1986). The Puranas. Otto Harrassowitz Verlag. ISBN 978-3447025225.
