= Kalki Purana =

Sanskrit Hindu narrative text of Kalki

The Kalki Purana (Sanskrit: कल्किपुराण, romanized: Kalkipurāṇa) is a Vaishnava Hindu text about the tenth avatar of Vishnu named Kalki. The Sanskrit text was likely composed in Bengal during an era when the region was being ruled by the Bengal Sultanate or the Mughal Empire. Wendy Doniger dates it to sometime between 1500 AD and 1700 AD. It has a floruit of 1726 AD based on a manuscript discovered in Dhaka, Bangladesh.

== Structure ==
It is not one of the 18 Mahapuranas (great Puranas) and is counted as an Upapurana or secondary Purana. The extant text exists in many versions, which vary in structure and details. Some do not divide the text into sections and have about 35 chapters. One manuscript comprises three aṃśas (sections) consisting 7 and 21 chapters respectively.

== Content ==
=== Family lineage of Kali ===
The beginning of the Kalki Purana describes Kali's lineage starting with Brahma, his great-great-grandfather, and ending with the birth of his children's children. Instead of being born of poison from the churning of the ocean of milk according to other Hindu texts, he is the product of a long line of incestuous monsters born from Brahma's back. Kali is the great-great-grandson of Brahma. He is the son of Krodha (Anger) and his sister-turned-wife Himsa (Violence). He is the grandson of Dambha (Vanity) and his sister Maya (Illusion). He is the great-grandson of Adharma (Impropriety) and his wife, Mithya (Falsehood). Adharma was originally created from Brahma's back as a malinapataka (a very dark and deadly, sinful object). Kali and his family were created by Brahma to hasten the dissolution of the cosmos after the pralaya period was over. When his family takes human form on earth, they further taint the hearts and minds of mankind to bring about the end of the Dvapara Yuga and the beginning of the Kali Yuga. During the first stage of the Kali Yuga, the varnashrama breaks down and deific worship is forsaken by man. All through the second, third, and fourth stages, man forgets the name of god and no longer offers yajna (offerings) to the devas.

=== Manifestation of Kalki on Earth ===
Brahma and the devas approach Vishnu for protection from the evils of the Kali Yuga. After listening to accounts of violence and injustice occurring in the universe, Vishnu promises to be born into the family of Vishnuyashas and Sumati in Shambala.

At a young age, Kalki is taught the holy scriptures on topics such as dharma, karma, artha and jñāna, and undertakes military training under the care of the Parashurama (the sixth incarnation of Vishnu). Soon, Kalki worships Shiva, who gets pleased by the devotion and provides him in return a divine white horse named Devadatta (a manifestation of Garuda), a powerful sword, whereby its handle is bedecked with jewels, and a parrot named Shuka, who is all-knowing, knowing the past, the present and the future. Other accessories are also given by other devas, devis, saints, and righteous kings. Kalki then marries princess Padmavati (an incarnation of Lakshmi), the daughter of King Vrihadratha and Queen Kaumudi of Simhala (the island of the lion) and princess Ramā, the daughter of King Shashidhvaja and Queen Sushanta.

Kalki fights in many wars, ends evil, including Kali and his entire family bloodline, which is wiped out by the avatar's generals; he perishes from wounds inflicted by Dharma and Satya Yuga personified. Kalki, meanwhile, battles and simultaneously kills the asura's most powerful generals, Koka and Vikoka, twin asuras adept in the dark arts. Kalki then returns to Shambala to rule, inaugurates a new yuga for the good and divides the earth among his generals. Sumati and Vishnuyasha, his parents, will then travel to the holy place of Badrikashrama, where they will live. Kalki then leaves the earth to go to Vaikuntha as his dharma (duty) is completed.

== Origin ==
The Kalki Purana is a relatively recent text, likely composed in Bengal. Its dating terminus ante quem is the 18th-century. It is likely Bengal because its earliest manuscripts have been found in Bengal, and these are Sanskrit written in Bengali script, states the historian Sumit Sarkar. The colophons of these manuscripts places them in the 18th century. According to the Indologist Wendy Doniger, the Kalki Purana is broadly dated by scholars between 1500 and 1700 CE, though these earlier dates are "misguided conjectures". No manuscripts from or before the 17th century are known.

== Significance ==
According to Edwin Bernbaum, the Kalki Purana is a Hindu version of Shambala and its future references, there is no mythology in Hindi Scriptures has many features found in the Buddhist counterpart. Other scholars such as John Newman state that Buddhists borrowed the Hindu concept of Kalki and adapted the concept in the text Kalachakra Tantra. They combined their idea of Shambhala with Kalki to reflect the theo-political situation they faced after the arrival of Islam in Central Asia and western Tibet. The Buddhist texts also mention a king named Kalki from Shambhala who leads an army to destroy the Muslim persecutors of dhamma; then after the victory of good over evil and attainment of religious freedoms, Kalki ushers in a new era. The Buddhist text is dated to about the 10th-century. While the Kalachakra Tantra likely borrowed the Kalki concept, the Kalki Purana post dates the Kalachakra Tantra. The much later era Buddhist text Vimalaprabha, which comments on Kalachakra Tantra, also mentions Kalki and provides details not found in Kalki Purana such as the Shambala being north of River Shita. According to John Newman, this river is also called Tarim River in central Asia (east Turkistan).

== See also ==
- Ramayana
- Mahabharata

== Bibliography ==
- Himanshu Aneria, Kalki Purana, Fusion Books (1969) ISBN 81-288-0588-6
