= Riaz Ahmed Gohar Shahi =

Pakistani spiritual leader

Riaz Ahmed Gohar Shahi ریاض احمد گوہر شاہی
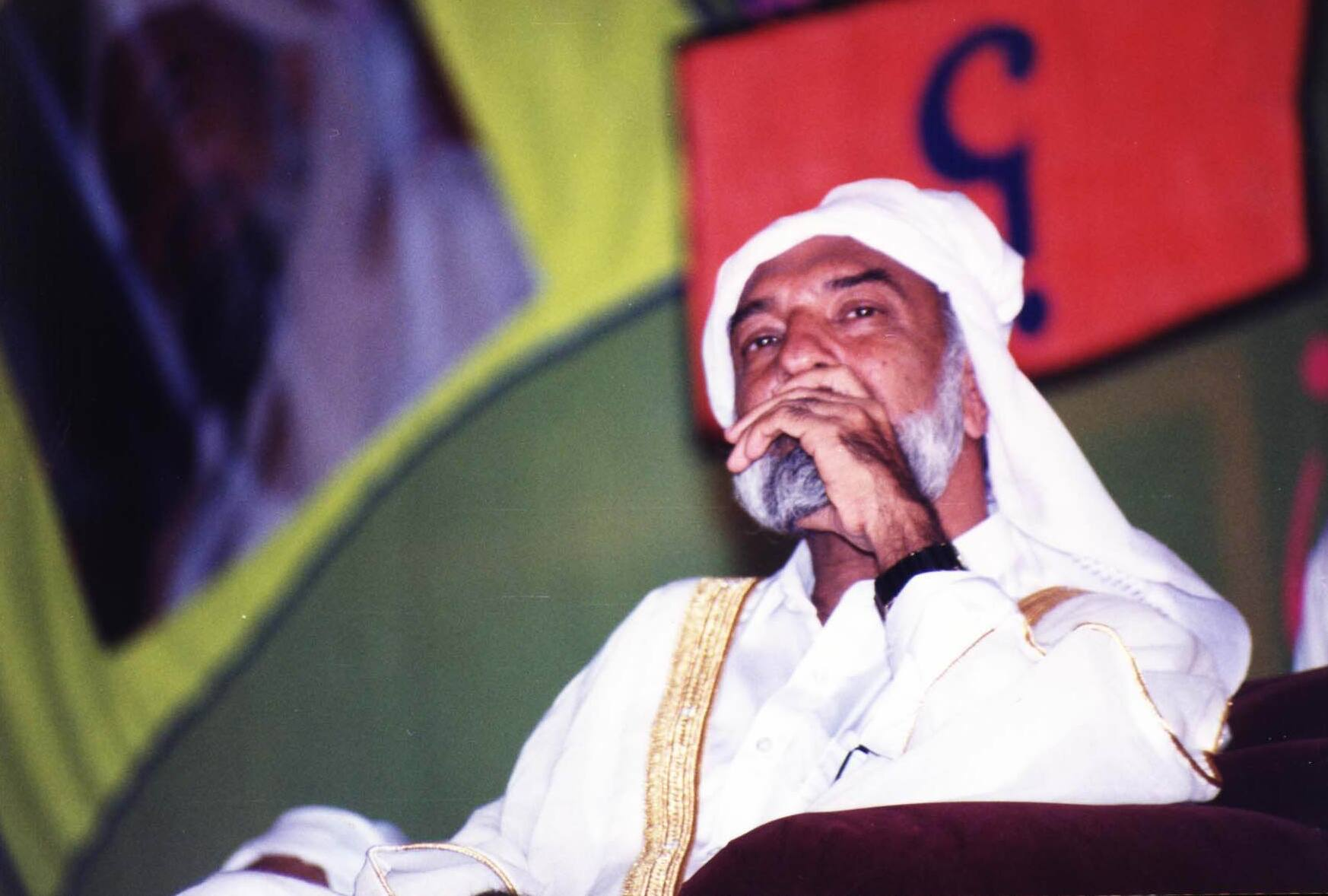
- Gohar Shahi during an event held in Pakistan
- Born: 25 November 1941; Dhok Gohar Shah, Mohra Noori, Rawalpindi, British India (now Pakistan)
- Disappeared: 2001
- Organization: Anjuman Sarfaroshan E Islam
- Movement: Spiritualism Teachings

Riaz Ahmed Gohar Shahi (Urdu: ریاض احمد گوھر شاہی) (born 25 November 1941) is a Sufi leader and founder of the spiritual groups RAGS International (now known as Messiah Foundation International) and Anjuman Serfaroshan-e-Islam.

He is the author of a number of Urdu books on topics relating to spirituality, the most successful among these being Deen-e-Ilahi "The Religion of God" (2000), which was republished by Balboa Press, a division of Hay House and translated into English and other languages by Messiah Foundation International in 2012.

RAGS International was renamed to Messiah Foundation International in 2000. MFI reports that Shahi claimed to be the Mahdi, Messiah, and Kalki Avatar. Shahi disappeared from public view in 2001. There have been claims that he died in that year or in 2003, but these are unconfirmed.

== Biography ==
=== Early life ===
Shahi was born on 25 November 1941 in the village of Dhok Gohar Shah in the district of Rawalpindi of British India. He is a fifth generation descendant of the Sufi Baba Gohar Ali Shah.

At the age of twenty, when he was the owner of F.Q. Steel Industries, Shahi began to search for spirituality. Eventually he became disillusioned in this search and returned to work. Shahi then married and had three children.

In 1975, he went to Sehwan for self-mortification; he spent a period of three years in the mountains of Sehwan Sharif and the forest of Laal Bagh in self-purification, "for the sake of God's love".

=== Career as spiritual leader ===
Shahi became popular as a Sufi preacher in Pakistan during the late 1970s. He formed RAGS International and Anjuman Serfaroshan-e-Islam in 1980. Of the two organisations, RAGS International is still active as Messiah Foundation International whereas Anjuman Serfaroshan-e-Islam was reported to have been dissolved and banned in Pakistan in 2011.

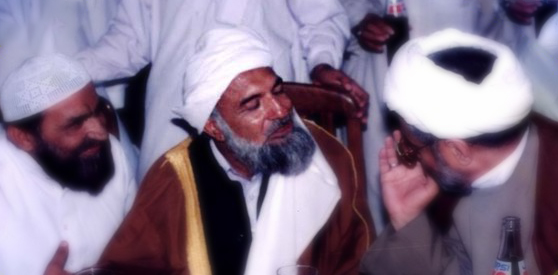
Shahi at an event at Imam Bargah-e-Noor-e-Iman Mosque, in Karachi, Pakistan. He is seen here speaking to two religious clerics from different sects within Islam: Shia Islam and Sunni Islam.

The CEO of Messiah Foundation International is Younus AlGohar. Shahi claimed to have met with Jesus Christ in 1997.

Lebanese American mystic Hisham Kabbani has sat at his feet, learned from him, and praised him. Singers such as Nusrat Fateh Ali Khan and Ghulam Farid Sabri have been presented the message of Shahi. Some singers such as Aziz Mian and Rahat Fateh Ali Khan have performed at Shahi related events. Yet, they had nothing to do with his beliefs, but only performed for the sake of entertainment.

=== Legal persecution and exile ===
He and many of his followers have been convicted under Islamic blasphemy laws by an antiterrorist court in Sindh. After he fled to England, Shahi was convicted in absentia, receiving sentences that totaled approximately 59 years.

=== Disappearance ===
Shahi was reported to have disappeared in 2001, in London; afterwards, sightings of him were reported around the world of people claiming to have met and received spiritual guidance from him.

In February 2002, prior to any decision on appeals filed with the High Court of Sindh, Ardeshir Cowasjee claimed in an article he wrote for the Pakistani newspaper Dawn, that unnamed people who identified themselves to him as office-bearers of the All-Faith Spiritual Movement told him that Gohar Shahi died abroad, but this report was unconfirmed.

There have been rumours of him dying, with some sources reporting that he died in 2001 and others saying he died in 2003. According to the Pakistani Press Foundation Shahi died in 2001. An article from 2006 in the Sunday Telegraph reports that Shahi died in 2003, and a 2009 article in Your Local Guardian also says that he was reported to have died in 2003. However, none of these reports have been confirmed, as there is no body.

On the other hand, the Indian news agency PTI reported in 2008 that Shahi was based in the United Kingdom after being convicted of blasphemy by the High Court of Sindh. This view is supported by the Indian Express which reported in 2008 that Shahi had fled to the United Kingdom and was presently based there. Zee News also supported this claim. The Hindustan Times has reported that he is "serving a life term". The Sunday Leader in Sri Lanka stated that Shahi disappeared in 2001 and sightings of him were thereafter reported around the world.

Of the two factions of Shahi's followers, the Anjuman Serfaroshan-e-Islam had asserted that Shahi died, and built a tomb for him at the Markazi Aastana in Kotri, where devotees performed pilgrimage. The MFI, in contrast, declares that he merely disappeared.

== Claims and criticism ==
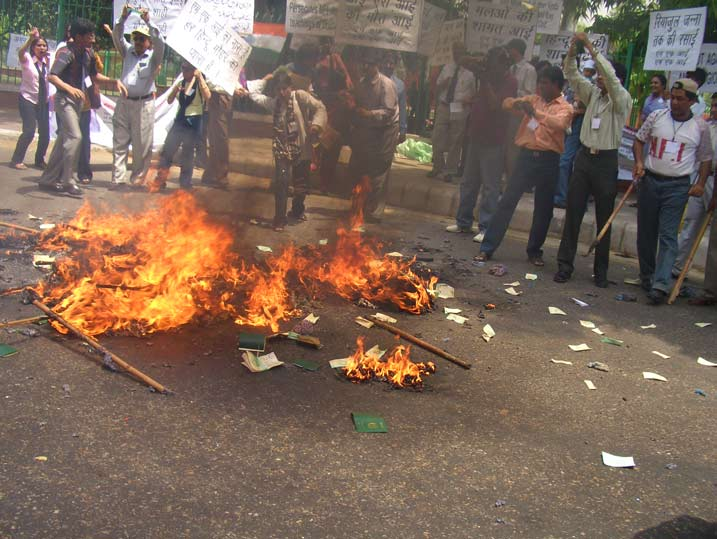
Pakistani followers of Shahi burning passports during a protest in India during April, 2007.

The teachings of Gohar Shahi have been a source of controversy. Many mainstream Muslim scholars have condemned his teachings as blasphemy.

Claims made by Shahi and his followers have been strongly opposed by orthodox Islamic theologians in Pakistan and abroad. Shahi has been accused of claiming the status of a prophet. His teachings have been condemned by Muslim religious leaders and the Pakistani government.

Shahi also predicts that the world would end in the year 2026 due to a comet heading towards earth. He claims the comet will be the cause of "total destruction" though mentions that "in order to intimidate [mankind]… God plans destruction on a small scale".

Many attempts were made on the lives of Shahi and Younus AlGohar including a petrol bomb thrown into AlGohar's residence in Manchester, where Shahi stayed when he toured the United Kingdom. A man attempted to attack him with a hand grenade during a discourse at his home in Kotri, Pakistan. A bounty was put on his head in Pakistan.

Shahi's books have been banned by the government of Pakistan, and his followers are not allowed to meet in public.

Gohar Shahi claimed to have met with Jesus in America. Shahi's supporters claim that his face became prominent on the Moon, Sun, nebula star and the Black Stone in Mecca, and that these appearances are signs from God that Gohar Shahi is the awaited Imam Mahdi, Messiah, and Kalki Avatar.

The alleged images induced greater legal and religious opposition. Shahi has also supported this claim, saying that God had revealed the images of Shahi on the Moon and various locations, for which Shahi himself was not responsible, and if questions should be raised, they should be raised to God. Messiah Foundation International asserts the alleged images to be signs from God, pointing to Shahi being the awaited Mahdi; they quote religious texts as well as sayings from the likes of Nostradamus, and Ja'far al-Sadiq to support it.

Journalists in Pakistan asked Shahi,

"Many believe that you are the Mahdi, and God has revealed signs unto them which say that you are the Mahdi, but you do not officially announce that you are the Mahdi. Why?" Shahi gestured towards himself and answered, "Does Imam Mahdi not know the law of Pakistan? He knows that the law of Pakistan declares that 'whosoever claims to be the Mahdi, put him in jail'. I have given the signs of his [Mahdi's] characteristics, which the Mahdi knows and none other. Now, it is up to people to recognise him and believe him".

On 18 November 1997, after appearing in court before Justice Rasheed A. Razvi of Sindh High Court Hyderabad Circuit, Shahi said, "The only justification to be Hazrat Imam Mahdi is the mark on [one's] back which can prove his existence".

Of the groups following Shahi, Messiah Foundation International claims that Shahi is the awaited Mahdi, Messiah, and Kalki Avatar while Anjuman Serfaroshan-e-Islam did not. According to MFI's website, Shahi is the Awaited Messiah, but they deny the notion that Shahi is another form of Jesus and claim that Jesus has also returned to support the Mahdi.

== Bibliography ==
Gohar Shahi authored a number of books, including one based on Sufi poetry known as Taryāq-e-Qalb which translates to the "'Cure of Hearts'". One of his most prominent books is Deen-e-Ilahi (The Religion of God). Works by Gohar Shahi include:

Title	Urdu	Translation	Date	Content
Taryāq-e-Qalb	تریاقِ قلب	The Cure of Hearts	1976	Sufi poetry
Menāra-e-Noor	مینارہِ نور	The Minaret of Light	1980	mysticism, spiritualism
Roshnās	روشناس	The Induction	1982	mysticism, spiritualism
Rouhani Safar	روحانی سفر	Spiritual Journey	1986	autobiography
Tohfa-tul Majālis	تحفةُ المجالس	The Gift of Congregations	1988	mysticism, spiritualism
Deen-e-Ilāhi	دینِ الٰہی	The Religion of God	2000	mysticism, spiritualism

In 2012, Messiah Foundation International republished The Religion of God with Balboa Press.

Messiah Foundation International considers Shahi to be the author of the "Goharian Philosophy of Divine Love", a set of principles upon which the organisation is founded. Shahi has also authored a monthly magazine, Hatif-e-Mahdi, which is banned in Pakistan for allegedly containing material offensive to the religious feelings of Muslims there.

== See also ==
- List of people who disappeared mysteriously: post-1970
- List of messiah claimants
- Messiah complex
