= Trishna (Vedic thought) =

Trishna (Sanskrit: तृष्णा) means – 'thirst' (Caitanya Caritamrta Adi 4.149), 'aspiration' (Caitanya Caritamrta Antya 14.44), 'longing', 'craving' or 'lusty desires' (Srimad Bhagavatam 9.19.18), or as तृष्णज् meaning covetous, greedy or thirsting. Trishna is the Eighth Nidana, spiritual love.

== Meaning ==
The Sanskrit root of the word Tṛishṇā (तृष्णा) is Tṛish (तृष्) meaning to be thirsty, to thirst, to thirst for (metaphorically), strong desire or long for. In the Vedas the accent is on the first syllable as in - Tṛishyā (to be thirsty), Tṛishṇākshaya (cessation of desire, tranquillity of mind, resignation, patience, content), Tṛishnāghna (quenching the thirst), Tṛishṇāmaya (ill with thirst), Tṛishṇāmāra (dying of thirst), Tṛishṇāri (enemy of thirst), Tṛishālu (thirsting much, very thirsty), Tṛishyat (thirsting) or Tṛishya (thirst). Trishna in Pali (tanha) means thirst for life.

== Vedic relevance ==
The word Trishna appears in the Rig Veda in a few mantras where it refers to greed, craving, hankering or longing, and the like. In mantra Rig Veda (I.XXXVII.6), Rishi Ghora Kanva states:

मो षु णः परा परा निर्ऋतिर्दुर्हणा बधीत् |
पदीष्ट तृष्णया सह ||

He speaks about the (unfavourable ) wind (निर्ऋतिः) which flows on greedily (तृष्णया). And, in mantra Rig Veda (I.LXXXV.11), Rishi Rahugano Gotama stating -

जिह्मं नुनुद्रेऽवतं तया दिशासिञ्चन्नुत्सं गोतमाय तृष्णजे |
आ गच्छन्तीमवसा चित्रभानवः कामं विप्रस्य तर्पयन्त धामभिः ||

speaks about the wise ones craving (तृष्णजे) for opportunities to sate the thirst of those hankering (तर्पयन्त ) for knowledge.

== Buddhist relevance ==
Gautama Buddha said that the cause of sorrow – the second of the Four Noble Truths – is desire; and the cause of desire is tanha or trishna.

The truth is - that deeds come from upādāna (clinging to existence), upādāna comes from trishna (craving), trishna comes from vedana (torture), the perception of pain and pleasure, the desire for rest; sensation (contact with objects) brings desire for life or the will to live.

Buddhism teaches the doctrine of inaction, i.e. cessation of activity, desiring or doing little. The extinction of craving of the desire for existence in all its forms and the consequent cessation of suffering is Nirvana (Nirvana is grasping nothingness and possessing nothing which state is reached through the knowledge of impermanence and voidness). Vivekananda holds that the Buddhist doctrine of giving up trishna ('greed') is an offshoot of Advaita Vedanta.

== Puranic relevance ==
According to the Puranas, Trishna is the daughter of Kamadeva or Kama, the god of love and husband of Rati; Aniruddha is her brother. Vishnu Purana tells us that Anrita ('falsehood') married his own sister, Nikritti ('immorality') and had two sons, Bhaya ('fear') and Naraka ('hell'), and two daughters, Maya ('illusion' or 'deceit') and Vedana ('torture') who again married each other. The son of Bhaya and Maya is Mrityu ('death'), and Dukha ('sorrow' or 'pain') is the son of Naraka and Vedana. From Mrityu descended Vyadhi ('disease'), Jara ('decay'), Shoka ('sorrow' or 'grief'), Trishna ('desire' or 'greed') and Krodha ('anger'). Trishna ('Greediness') is the wife or mistress of Lobha ('Greed').

== Vedantic relevance ==
Shankara explains that the intellect (buddhi) of those who perceive the Being as affected with difference of space etc., cannot be brought immediately to an intuition of the highest reality; Brahman is to be realized as attributeless. He states that even if the knowers of Brahman of themselves abstain from objects of sensual enjoyment yet the thirst (trishna) caused by being addicted to sensuality in different births cannot at once be converted. Renunciation is brahmacāryam or stri-vishaya-tyāga. Trishna, that causes dukkha, the philosophical translation of which is unsatisfactoriness rather than pain, is immoderate desire as such; Trishna is the will-to-live.

== Upanishadic relevance ==
In the Brihadaranyaka Upanishad (IV.iv.6) in the passage –

इति नु कामयमानः; अथाकाम्यमानः – योऽकामो निष्काम आप्तकाम आत्तकामो न तस्य प्राणा उत्क्रामन्ति, ब्रह्मेव सन्ब्रह्माप्येति ||

the word Kāma (काम) refers to desires – the man who desires migrates, but the man who is without desires never migrates; of him who is without desires, who is free from desires, the objects of whose desire have been attained, and to whom all objects of desire are but the Self – the organs do not depart, being Brahman, he is merged in Brahman. It is held that the main fundamental Buddhist thought, Nirvana i.e. the removal of suffering by removal of trishna, is an echo of the afore-cited Upanishadic doctrine of union with Brahman by the removal of Kāma.

In the Bhagavad Gita (Sloka XIV.7), Krishna tells Arjuna:

रजो रागात्मकं विद्धि तृष्णाऽऽसङ्गस्मुदभवम् |
तन्निबध्नाति कौन्तेय कर्मसङ्गेन देहिनम् ||

"Know that Rajas is essentially attachment; it is the source of craving and passion."
"O Son of Kunti! It binds the embodied Spirit with attachment to works."

Here, the word Rāga refers to attachment, and Trishna, refers to the craving for what is unattained.

== Implication ==
From the Chandogya Upanishad (VIII.viii.5, VIII.ix.1, VIII.xii.1-3) we learn that the term Asura (आसुर) signifies the natural and impulsive ('demonical') actions of the senses which are promoted by the desire for an object of pleasure called Asu (असु), and that the term Deva (देव), which is derived from the verb Div (दिव) signifying 'illumination', stands for the functions of the senses illuminated by reason. Prajapati tells Indra that the body which is mortal because it is covered by death is the seat of the self which is immortal and bodiless; anything embodied is within the range of the desirable and the non-desirable which two aspects cannot affect one who has become unembodied. The tranquil one having become established in his own nature after rising up from his body reaches the supreme Light and becomes Brahman. Vishnugupta (Chanakya) in his Chanakya Niti tells us that "anger is personification of Yama, ('the demi-god of death'), thirst is like hellish river Vaitarani, knowledge is like Kamadhenu ('the cow of plenty'), and contentment is like Nandanavana ('the garden of Indra')".
