= Adivasi =

Varied tribal groups in the Indian subcontinent

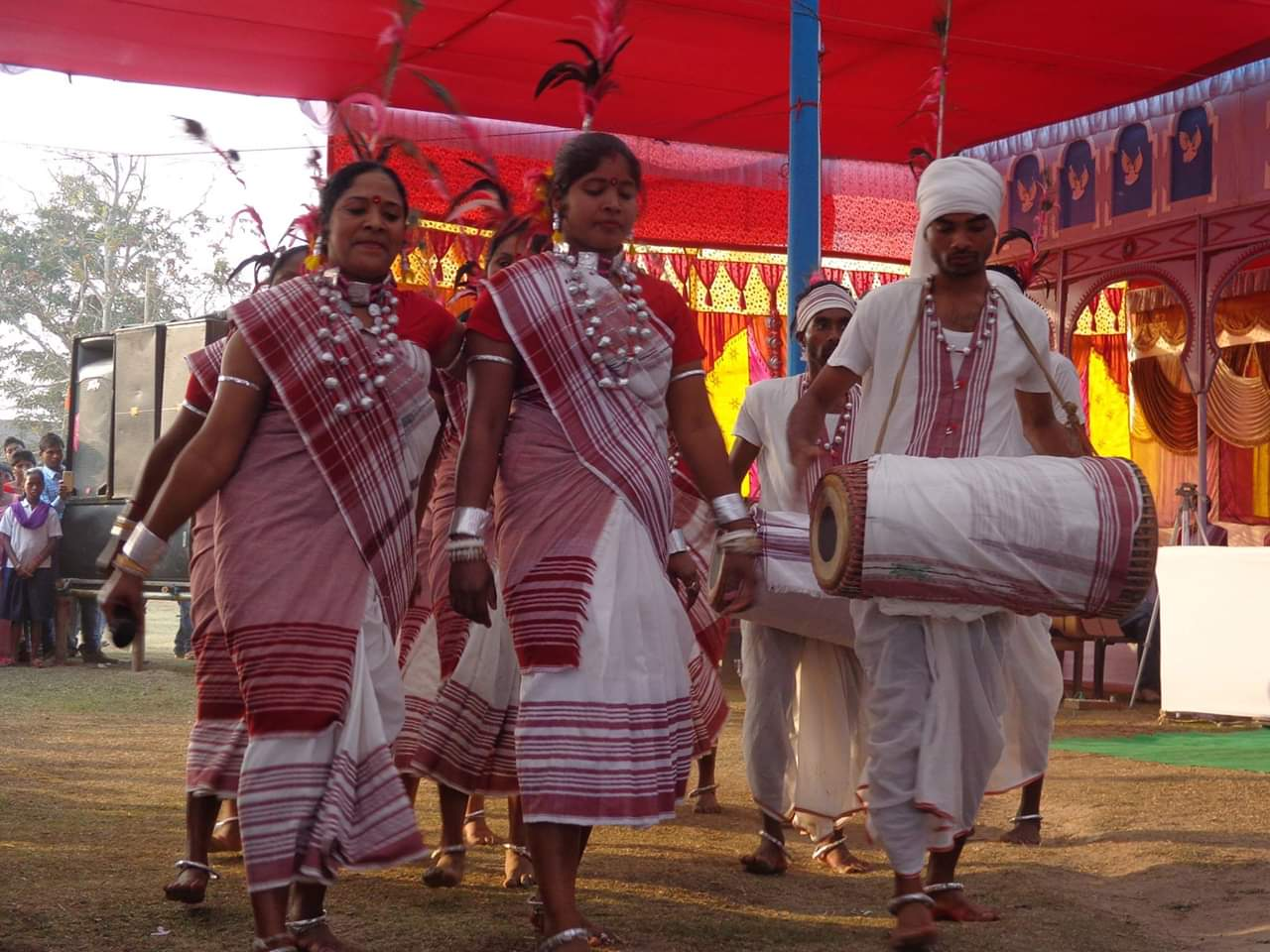
Dance of the Kurukh people, a tribe in eastern India

The Adivasi (also spelled Adibasi) are the heterogeneous tribal groups across the Indian subcontinent. The term Adivasi, a 20th-century construct meaning "ancient inhabitants", is now widely used as a self-designation by many of the communities who are officially recognised as "Scheduled Tribes" in India and as "Ethnic minorities" in Bangladesh. They constitute approximately 8.6% of India's population (around 104.2 million, according to the 2011 Census) and about 1.1% of Bangladesh's population (roughly 2 million, 2010 estimate).

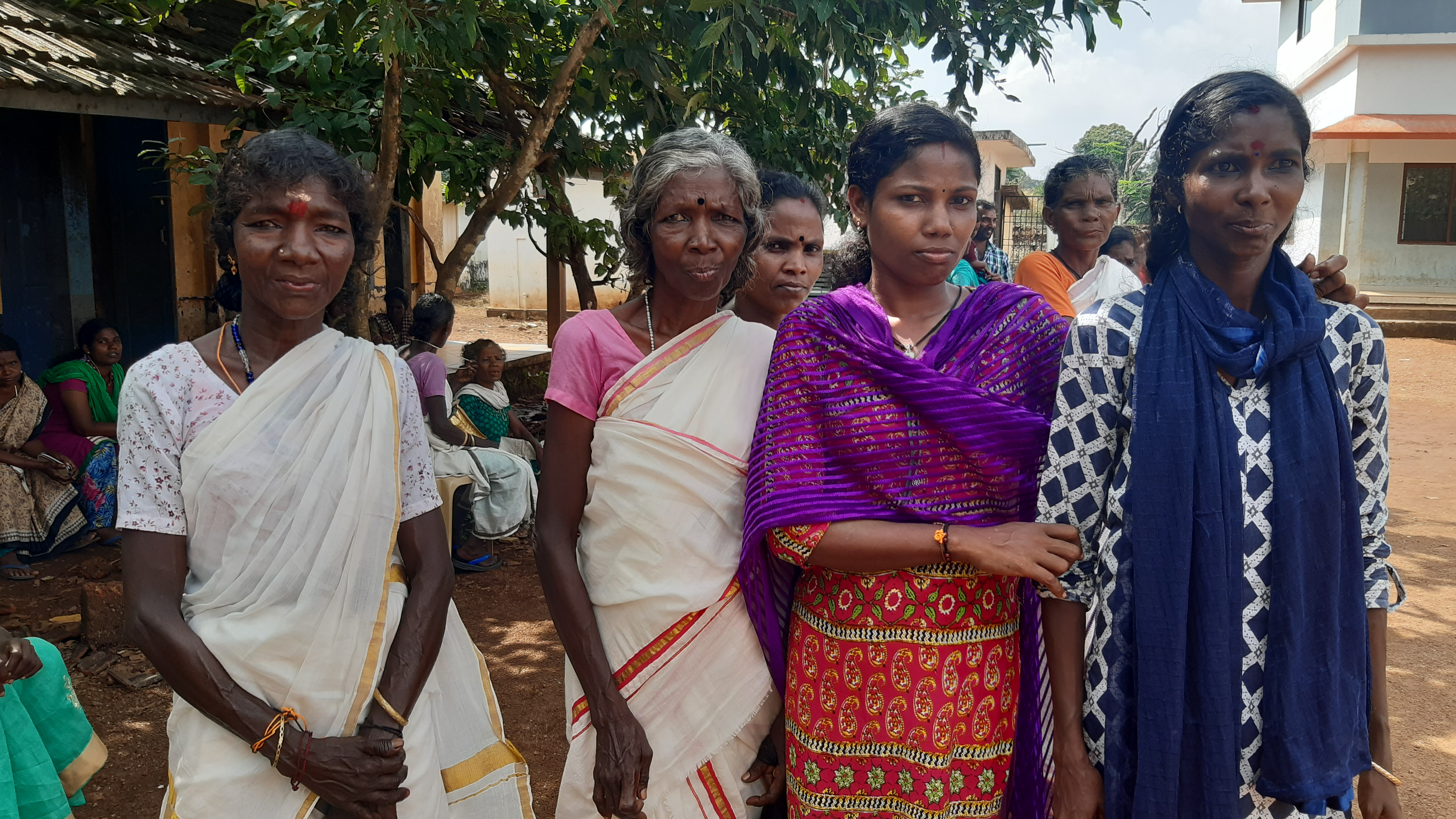
Paniya women in Kerala

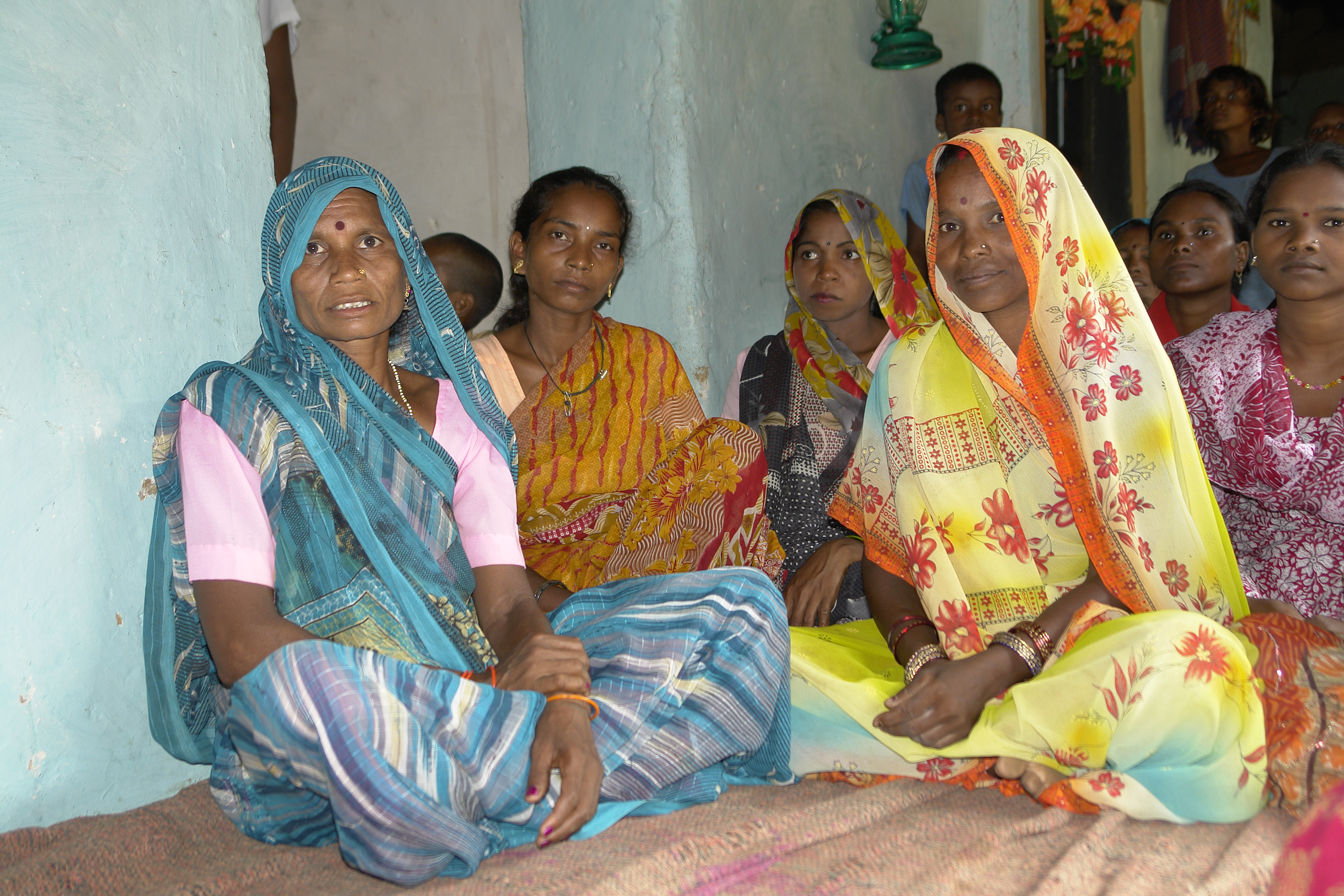
Gondi women in Umaria district, India

Claiming to be among the original inhabitants of the Indian subcontinent, many present-day Adivasi communities formed during the flourishing period of the Indus Valley Civilisation or after its decline, harbouring various degrees of ancestry from Dravidians, Indo-Aryan, Austroasiatic, and Tibeto-Burman peoples.

Adivasi studies is a new scholarly field, drawing upon archaeology, anthropology, agrarian history, environmental history, subaltern studies, indigenous studies, aboriginal studies, and developmental economics. It adds debates that are specific to the Indian context.

== Definition and etymology ==
Adivasi is the collective term for the tribes of the Indian subcontinent, who are claimed to be the indigenous people of India. It refers to "any of various ethnic groups considered to be the original inhabitants of the Indian subcontinent".

In most Indo-Aryan languages, such as Hindi and Bengali, Adivasi means "Original Inhabitants," The word is derived from the Sanskrit ādi 'beginning, origin'; and vāsin 'dweller' (itself from vas 'to dwell'), thus literally meaning 'beginning inhabitant'. Although terms such as atavika, vanavāsi ("forest dwellers"), or girijan ("mountain people") are also used for the tribes of India, adivāsi carries the specific meaning of being the original and autochthonous inhabitants of a given region, and the self-designation of those tribal groups. However, the use and acceptance of the term Adivasi vary across places, communities, and contexts and does not always carry its original connotation. For instance tribal people of North East India do not use the term adivasi for themselves, and prefer the words "Indigenous" or "Tribe". The term Adivāsi applies only to the immigrated Tea-tribes of Central Indian origin. In Bangladesh, the term adivasi is also used to refer tribal people of Central Indian affiliation, although not popularly as India, wherein the Adivasi have designated as "Ethnic minorities" (Khudro Nritattik Jonogoshti). Similarly the term Adivasi Janjati used in Nepal for hierarchically low-status ethnic groups in Nepal's caste system, having their own socio-cultural institutions, although the political context differed historically under the Shah and Rana dynasties. In Sri Lanka, the Vedda people are referred to as Adivasi.

The term Adivasi is a Sanskrit word specifically coined in 1930s by tribal political activists to give a distinct and collective indigenous identity to tribal people, alleging that Indo-Aryan and Dravidian ethnolinguistic groups are not indigenous to the land. The term was initially popularised by tribal activist organisations in present-day Jharkhand. Later, Thakkar Bapa used the word to advocate for a pan-Indian reference to the inhabitants of forests, a usage that was later adopted, although not popularly by Gandhi.

The Constitution of India, promulgated in 1950, designated the Adivasi communities as Scheduled Tribes (Anusuchit Janjati), grouping them together "as targets for social and economic development". Article 366 (25) defined Scheduled Tribes as "such tribes or tribal communities or parts of or groups within such tribes or tribal communities as are deemed under Article 342 to be Scheduled Tribes for the purposes of this constitution". Although Jaipal Singh Munda, a tribal member of the Constituent Assembly and president of the Jharkhand-based organisation Adivasi Mahasabha, advocated for the term 'Adivasi' over the replacement of 'aboriginal' with 'Scheduled Tribe' and its Hindi translation, 'Banjati', B. R. Ambedkar, chairman of the Drafting Committee, adopted 'Scheduled Tribe' for tribal people and 'Scheduled Caste' for untouchables. Explaining the choice, Ambedkar said: "why I substituted the word "scheduled" for the word "aboriginal" the explanation is ... the word 'scheduled tribe' has a fixed meaning, because it enumerates the tribes ... the word 'Adibasi' is really a general term which has no specific legal de jure connotation, something like the Untouchables [Dalits]. Anybody may include anybody in the term 'untouchable' [and Adibasi]. ... by this Constitution, we are conferring certain privileges, certain rights on these Adibasis. In order that, if the matter was taken to a court of law there should be a precise definition as to who are these Adibasis, it was decided to invent, so to say, another category or another term to be called 'Scheduled tribes' and to enumerate the Adibasis under that head." However, the term Adivasi maintained its influence in public discourse as a status quo, challenging the legally designated, state-specific administrative term Scheduled Tribes.

Judicially it remarked that "India is a country of old immigrants in which people have been coming in over the last ten thousand years or so ... who came mainly from the North-West, and to a lesser extent from the North-East ... At one time it was believed that the Dravidians were the original inhabitants. However, this view has been considerably modified subsequently, and now the generally accepted belief is that the original inhabitants of India were the pre-Dravidian aborigines, i.e. the ancestors of the present tribals or Adivasis (Scheduled Tribes). [sic]"

In India, although the terms "Tribe" and "Adivasi" are often used interchangeably, they have distinct contextual meanings. The former is an externally assigned anthropological term associated primarily with social characteristics, while the latter is a self-asserted socio-political term associated with autochthonous identity and broadly regarded as analogous to the global terms "Indigenous" and "Aboriginal". The use of term Adivasi as a socio-political construct has been scholarly critiqued for overlooking the regional historical complexities of indigeneity, including migration, linguistics, anthropology, and archaeology. On indigeneity, Hardiman argues that "the idea that Adivasis are autochthonous, or original, inhabitants is belied by the fact that many such groups are known to have migrated in recorded history into the areas in which they are now found, often displacing existing inhabitants in the process ... There have been so many migrations in and out of this region in past centuries that no particular jati [community] can have genuine grounds for making such a claim." but favours the term Adivasi, a self-designation arising from the nineteenth-century subjugation of previously autonomous communities, over "tribe", with its evolutionist connotations. Other scholars similarly hold that the meaning of "Adivasi" lies less in the literal claim of original inhabitancy than in a shared social position, as a relational identity shaped by historical marginalisation and by contrast with dominant groups and the state. In this view, both "tribe" and "Adivasi" are understood to have been shaped by colonial ethnography, forest policy, and administrative classification, and subsequently reworked by Adivasi movements as a basis for collective identity and political claims.

India does not exclusively recognise Adivasis a.k.a. Tribes a.k.a. Scheduled Tribes as indigenous people of India, rather considers all Indians as indigenous to the land. Thus, India has disagreed or refused at various international forums, when there is uncertainty in the concepts of indigeneity. For instance, although India initially ratified the International Labour Organization (ILO) Convention 107 on Indigenous and Tribal Populations Convention, 1957, in 1989, India refused to sign the ILO Convention 169. In 2007, considering all Indians as indigenous, India voted for the Declaration on the Rights of Indigenous Peoples in the United Nations General Assembly.

== Demographics ==
Percent of scheduled tribes in India by tehsils by census 2011

Scheduled Tribes distribution map in India by state and union territory according to 2011 Census. Mizoram and Lakshadweep had the highest % of its population as ST (≈95%), while Punjab and Haryana had 0%.

A substantial number of Adivasi a.k.a. tribal communities are recognised as Scheduled Tribes under the Constitution of India. Those Scheduled Tribes constitute 8.6% of India's population, while in Bangladesh they are designated as "Ethnic minority" and constitute around 1.1% of Bangladesh's population.

One concentration lies in a belt along the northwest Himalayas: consisting of Jammu and Kashmir, where are found many semi-nomadic groups, to Ladakh and northern Himachal Pradesh and Uttarakhand, where are found Tibeto-Burman groups.

In the northeastern states of Arunachal Pradesh, Meghalaya, Mizoram, and Nagaland, more than 90% of the population is tribal. However, in the remaining northeast states of Assam, Manipur, Sikkim, and Tripura, Adivasi form between 20 and 30% of the population.

The largest population of tribal people lives in a belt stretching from eastern Gujarat and Rajasthan in the west all the way to western West Bengal, a region known as the tribal belt. These tribes correspond roughly to three regions. The western region, in eastern Gujarat, southeastern Rajasthan, northwestern Maharashtra as well as western Madhya Pradesh, is dominated by Indo-Aryan speaking tribes like the Bhils. The central region, covering eastern Maharashtra and Madhya Pradesh, western and southern Chhattisgarh, northern and eastern Telangana, northern Andhra Pradesh and western Odisha is dominated by Dravidian tribes like the Gonds and Khonds. The eastern belt, centred on the Chhota Nagpur Plateau in Jharkhand and adjacent areas of Chhattisgarh, Odisha and West Bengal, is dominated by Munda tribes like the Bhumijs, Hos and Santals. Roughly 75% of the total tribal population live in this belt, although the tribal population there accounts for only around 10% of the region's total population.

Further south, the region near Bellary in Karnataka has a large concentration of tribal people, mostly Boyas/ Valmikis. Small pockets can be found throughout the rest of South India. By far the largest of these pockets is in found in the region containing the Nilgiris district of Tamil Nadu, Wayanad district of Kerala and nearby hill ranges of Chamarajanagar and Mysore districts of southern Karnataka. Further south, only small pockets of tribal settlement remain in the Western and Eastern Ghats.

The scheduled tribe population in Jharkhand constitutes 26.2% of the state. Adivasi in Jharkhand mainly follow Sarnaism, an animistic religion. Chhattisgarh has also over 80 lakh scheduled tribe population. Assam has over 40 lakh Adivasis primarily as tea workers. Adivasis in India mainly follow Animism, Hinduism and Christianity.

In the case of Bangladesh, most Adivasi groups are found in the Chittagong Hill Tracts along the border with Myanmar, and in the Northwestern parts of the country, with Chakma, Marma, Munda and Santal being the most populous. The Chittagong Hill Tracts are home to various Tibeto-Burman-speaking groups like the Chakma and Marma who are followers of Buddhism, and Tripuri who are Hindus. While the plains dwelling Santal and the Munda follow animism. A small percentage of adivasis in Bangladesh, like the Khasi, are Christians.

== History ==
=== Origin ===
Though claimed to be the original inhabitants of India, many present-day Adivasi communities formed after the decline of the Indus Valley Civilisation, harbouring various degrees of ancestry from ancient hunter-gatherers, Indus Valley Civilisation, Indo-Aryan, Austroasiatic and Tibeto-Burman language speakers. Only Adivasi of Andaman Islands remained isolated for more than 25,000 years.

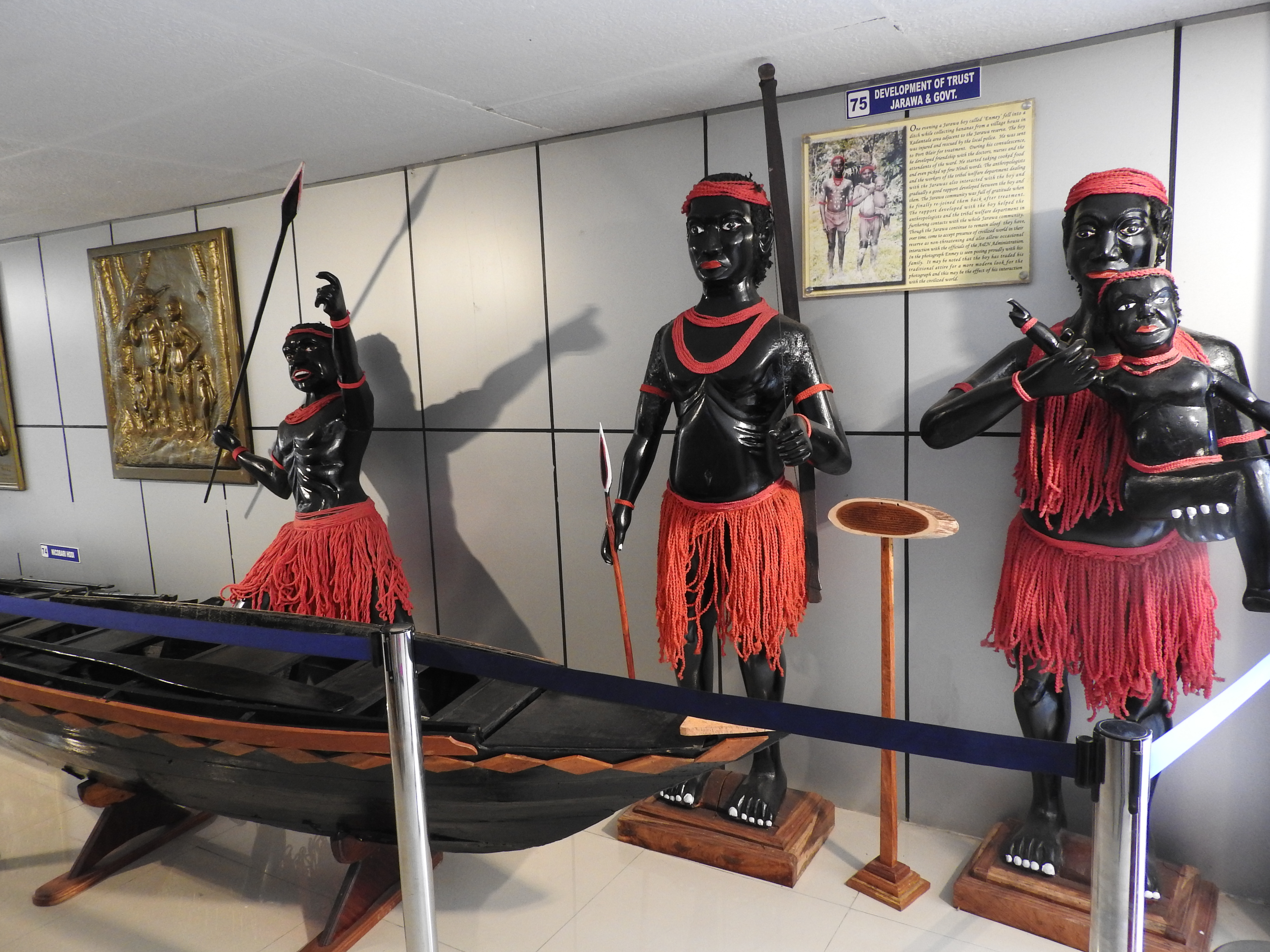
A Jarawa themed museum, showing casual clothing styles. The Jarawa are one of the indigenous tribes of the Andaman Islands in South Asia

=== Ancient and medieval period ===
According to linguist Anvita Abbi, tribes in India are characterised by distinct lifestyle and are outside of the caste system. Although considered uncivilised and primitive, Adivasis were usually not held to be intrinsically impure by surrounding populations (usually Dravidian or Indo-Aryan), unlike Dalits, who were. (Note: Barnes: "Although regarded by some British scholars as inferior to caste Hindus, the status of "adivasis" in practice most often paralleled that of the Hindus [...] In areas where they accounted for a large proportion of the population, adivasis often wielded considerable ritual and political power, being involved in investiture of various kings and rulers throughout central India and Rajasthan [...] In central India there were numerous "adivasi" kingdoms, some of which survived from medieval times to the nineteenth century.) Thus, the Adivasi origins of Valmiki, who composed the Ramayana, were acknowledged, as were the origins of Adivasi tribes such as the Garasia and Bhilala, which descended from mixed Rajput and Bhil marriages. Unlike the subjugation of the Dalits, the Adivasis often enjoyed autonomy and, depending on region, evolved mixed hunter-gatherer and farming economies, controlling their lands as a joint patrimony of the tribe. In some areas, securing Adivasi approval and support was considered crucial by local rulers, and larger Adivasi groups were able to sustain their own kingdoms in central India. The Bhil, Meenas and Gond Rajas of Garha-Mandla and Chanda are examples of an Adivasi aristocracy that ruled in this region, and were "not only the hereditary leaders of their Gond subjects, but also held sway over substantial communities of non-Adivasi who recognized them as their feudal lords."

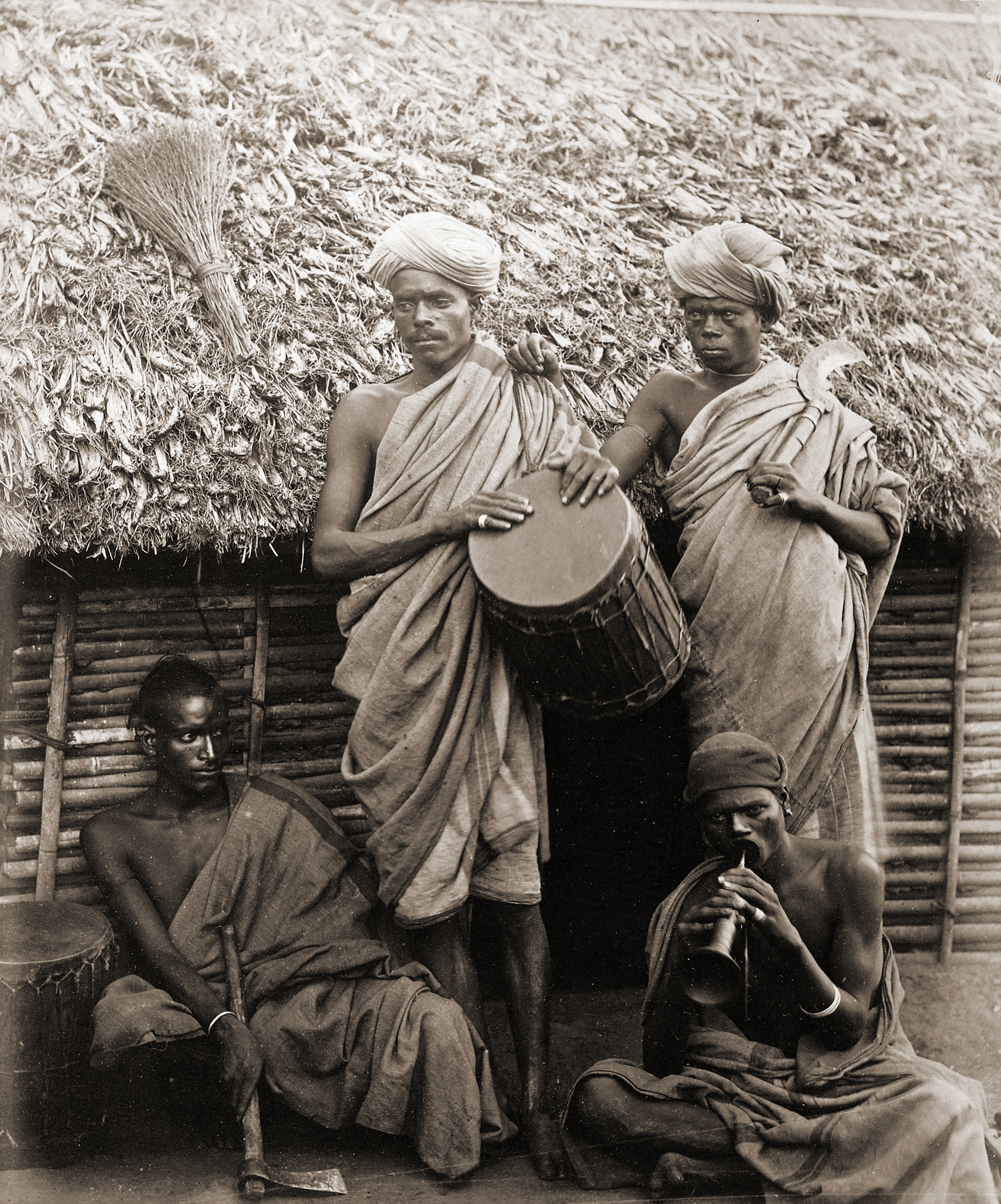
Irula men from the Nilgiri Hills in Tamil Nadu, c.1871

There are references to alliances between Ahom Kings of Brahmaputra valley and the hill Nagas. This relative autonomy and collective ownership of Adivasi land by Adivasis was severely disrupted by the advent of the Mughals in the early 16th century. Rebellions against Mughal authority include the Bhil Rebellion of 1632 and the Bhil-Gond Insurrection of 1643 which were both pacified by Mughal soldiers. With the advent of the Kachwaha Rajputs and Mughals into their territory, the Meenas were gradually sidelined and pushed deep into the forests. As a result, historical literature has completely bypassed the Meena tribe. The combined army of Mughals and Bharmal attacked the tribal king Bada Meena and killed him damaging 52 kots and 56 gates. Bada's treasure was shared between Mughals and Bharmal.

=== British period (c. 1857 – 1947) ===
During the period of British rule, the colonial administration encroached upon the adivasi tribal system, which led to widespread resentment against the British among the tribesmen. The tribesmen frequently supported rebellions or rebelled themselves, while their raja looked negatively upon the British administrative innovations. Beginning in the 18th century, the British added to the consolidation of feudalism in India, first under the Jagirdari system and then under the zamindari system. Beginning with the Permanent Settlement imposed by the British in Bengal and Bihar, which later became the template for a deepening of feudalism throughout India, the older social and economic system in the country began to alter radically. Land, both forest areas belonging to adivasis and settled farmland belonging to non-adivasi peasants, was rapidly made the legal property of British-designated zamindars (landlords), who in turn moved to extract the maximum economic benefit possible from their newfound property and subjects. Adivasi lands sometimes experienced an influx of non-local settlers, often brought from far away (as in the case of Muslims and Sikhs brought to Kol territory) by the zamindars to better exploit local land, forest and labour. Deprived of the forests and resources they traditionally depended on and sometimes coerced to pay taxes, many adivasis were forced to borrow at usurious rates from moneylenders, often the zamindars themselves. When they were unable to pay, they were forced to become bonded labourers for the zamindars. Often, far from paying off the principal of their debt, they were unable even to offset the compounding interest, and this was made the justification for their children working for the zamindar after the death of the initial borrower. In the case of the Andamanese adivasis, their protective isolation changed with the establishment of a British colonial presence on the islands. Lacking immunity against common infectious diseases of the Eurasian mainland, the large Jarawa communities in the southeastern regions of South Andaman Island experienced a massive population decline due to disease within four years of the establishment of a colonial presence on the island in 1789.

Land dispossession by the zamindars or interference by the colonial government resulted in a number of Adivasi revolts in the late eighteenth and early nineteenth centuries, such as the Bhumij rebellion of 1832-1833 and Santal hul (or Santhal rebellion) of 1855–56. Although these were suppressed by the governing British authority (the East India Company prior to 1858, and the British government after 1858), partial restoration of privileges to adivasi elites (e.g. to Mankis, the leaders of Munda tribes) and some leniency in levels of taxation resulted in relative calm in the region, despite continuing and widespread dispossession from the late nineteenth century onwards. The economic deprivation, in some cases, triggered internal adivasi migrations within India that would continue for another century, including as labour for the emerging tea plantations in Assam.

==== Participation in Indian independence movement ====
There were tribal reform and rebellion movements during the period of the British Empire, some of which also participated in the Indian independence movement or attacked mission posts. There were several Adivasis in the Indian independence movement including Birsa Munda, Dharindhar Bhyuan, Laxman Naik, Jantya Bhil, Bangaru Devi and Rehma Vasave, Mangri Oraon.

During the period of British rule, India saw the rebellions of several then backward castes, mainly Adivasis that revolted against British rule. These were:

- Halba rebellion (1774–79)
- Chakma rebellion (1776–1787)
- Chuar rebellion in Bengal (1795–1809)
- Bhopalpatnam Struggle (1795)
- Khurda Rebellion in Odisha (1817)
- Bhil rebellion (1822–1857)
- Ho-Munda Revolt(1816–1837)
- Paralkot rebellion (1825)
- Kol rebellion (1831–32)
- Bhumij rebellion (1832–33)
- Khond rebellion (1836)
- Tarapur rebellion (1842–54)
- Maria rebellion (1842–63)
- Santhal rebellion (1856–57)
- Bhil rebellion, begun by Tatya Tope in Banswara (1858)
- Koli revolt (1859)
- Great Kuki Invasion of 1860s
- Gond rebellion, begun by Ramji Gond in Adilabad (1860)
- Muria rebellion (1876)
- Rani rebellion (1878–82)
- Bhumkal (1910)
- Kuki Rebellion (1917–19)
- Rampa Rebellion of 1879, Vizagapatnam (now Visakhapatnam district)
- Rampa Rebellion (1922–1924), Visakhapatnam district
- Munda rebellion (1899–1900)

== Adivasi groups ==
There are more than 700 tribal groups in India. The major Scheduled Tribes (Adivasi) are:

- Andamanese
- Apatanis
- Asurs
- Baigas
- Bhils
- Bhotiyas
- Bhumijs
- Birhors
- Bodos
- Chakmas
- Cheros
- Deoris
- Dhodias
- Garos
- Gonds
- Ho
- Irulas
- Jarawas
- Kharias
- Khasis
- Kotas
- Koyas
- Kukis
- Marmas
- Meenas
- Mizos
- Mundas
- Nagas
- Nicobarese
- Onges
- Oraons
- Rabhas
- Sakachep/Khelmas
- Santhals
- Sentinelese
- Tharus
- Todas
- Tripuri
- Yenadis
- Warlis

== Language ==
Tribal languages can be categorised into five linguistic groupings, namely Andamanese; Austro-Asiatic; Dravidian; Indo-Aryan; and Sino-Tibetan.

- Arakanese
- Bawm
- Bhil
- Bhotiya
- Bhumij
- Bodo
- Bonda
- Chakma
- Chenchu
- Dhodia
- Gamit
- Garo
- Gondi
- Gujari
- Halbi
- Ho
- Irula
- Jaunsari
- Karbi
- Khasi
- Koch
- Koda
- Kokborok
- Koya
- Kora
- Kui
- Kuki
- Kurukh
- Mavchi
- Mizo
- Mundari
- Pangkhu
- Paniya
- Pnar
- Rathwa
- Sak
- Santali
- Shö
- Tharu
- Varli
- Vasavi

== Literature ==
Adivasi literature is composed in more than 100 languages. The tradition of tribal literature includes oral literature and written literature in tribal languages and non-tribal languages. The basic feature of tribal literature is the presence of tribal philosophy in it. Prominent tribal writers include Hansda Sowvendra Shekhar, Nirmala Putul, Vahru Sonawane, Temsula Ao, Mamang Dai, Narayan, Rose Kerketta, Ram Dayal Munda, Vandana Tete, Anuj Lugun etc.

== Religion ==
In the Census of India from 1871 to 1941, Adivasi and their religions were described in several ways: Forest tribe (1891); animist (1901); tribal animist (1911); hill and forest tribe (1921); primitive tribe (1931); and tribes (1941). However, since the census of 1951, the tribal population has been recorded separately, for each denomination. Some Adivasis have been converted to Christianity starting with British period and after independence. During the last two decades Adivasi from Odisha, Madhya Pradesh, Jharkhand have converted to Protestantism, as a result of increased presence of missionaries.

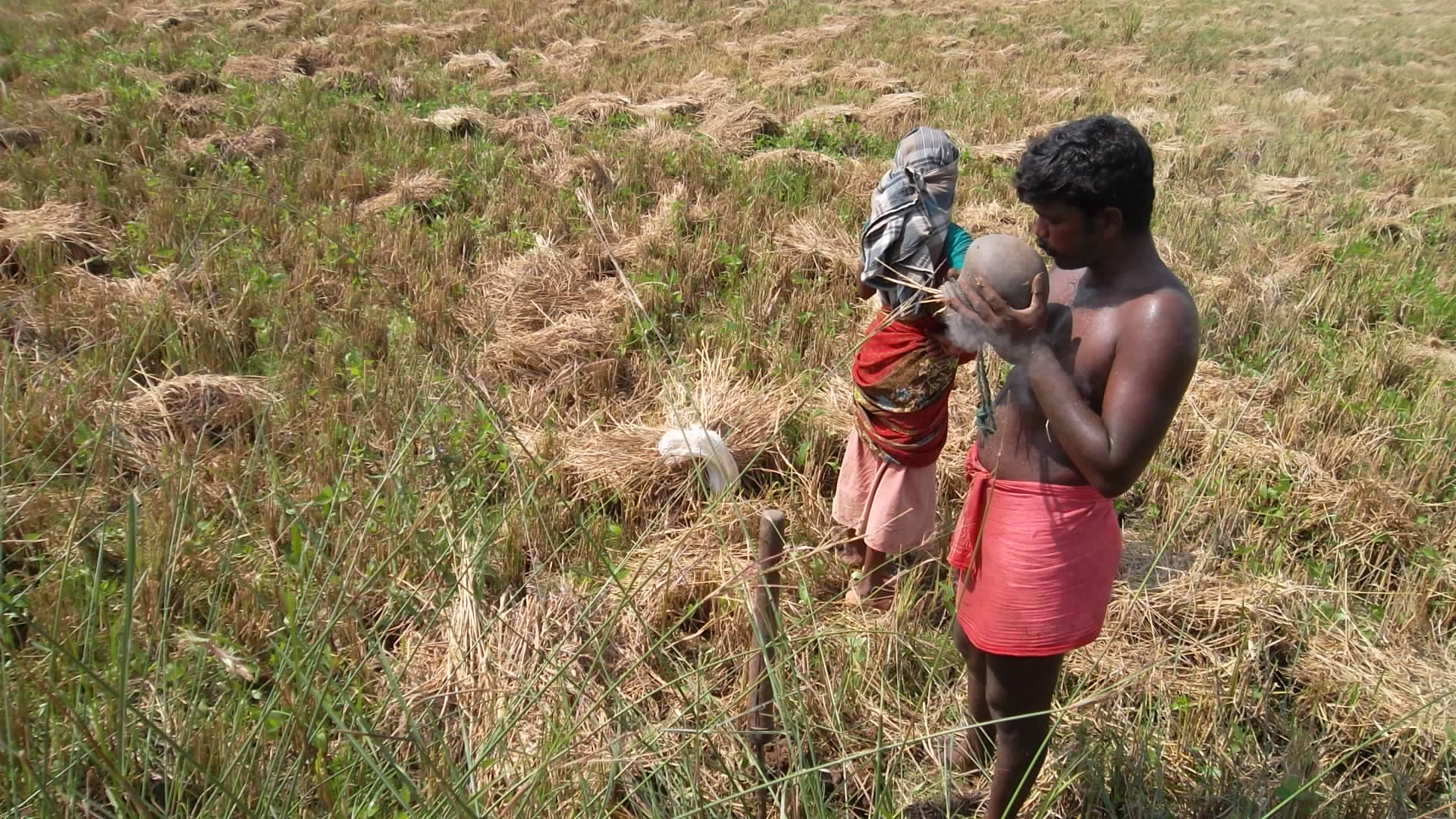
Irula man and woman.

Adivasi beliefs vary by tribe, and are usually different from the historical Vedic religion, with its monistic underpinnings, Indo-European deities (who are often cognates of ancient Iranian, Greek and Roman deities, e.g. Mitra/Mithra/Mithras), lack of idol worship and lack of a concept of reincarnation. Adivasi have their own distinct religions based in nature worship; most tribal people (more than 89%) identify as Hindus and follow the Hindu religion, some (5.53%) have embraced Christianity due to proselytisation by Christian Missionaries albeit not without social and cultural conflicts between their tribal roots and the newly adopted Christian traditions, and some Adivasi, mainly in Lakshadweep are Muslims and are believed to have embraced Islam during the 14th century; other Adivasi (4.19%) follow tribal religions. Conversion of Adivasi to Christianity has been a growing phenomenon from the days of the British rule. Christians have been jailed due to accusations of "forced conversions" of Adivasi. Conversion to Islam is a growing phenomenon in recent times. Adivasi in the Dang district, having their own distinct religions based in nature worship, are being proselytised to Hinduism, by Hindutva ideological groups such as the BJP & the Vishva Hindu Parishad (VHP). Tribal ancestor worshippers in the Nilgiris, have raised objections to be being labelled as Hindu, Muslim, or Christian.

=== Animism ===
Animism (from Latin animus, -i "soul, life") is the worldview that non-human entities (animals, plants, and inanimate objects or phenomena) possess a spiritual essence. The Encyclopaedia of Religion and Society estimates that 1–5% of India's population is animist. India's government recognises that India's indigenous subscribe to pre-Hindu animist-based religions.

Animism is used in the anthropology of religion as a term for the belief system of some indigenous tribal peoples, especially prior to the development of organised religion. Although each culture has its own different mythologies and rituals, "animism" is said to describe the most common, foundational thread of indigenous peoples' "spiritual" or "supernatural" perspectives. The animistic perspective is so fundamental, mundane, everyday and taken-for-granted that most animistic indigenous people do not even have a word in their languages that corresponds to "animism" (or even "religion"); the term is an anthropological construct rather than one designated by the people themselves.

==== Donyi-Polo ====
Donyi-Polo is the designation given to the indigenous religions, of animistic and shamanic type, of the Tani, from Arunachal Pradesh, in northeastern India. The name "Donyi-Polo" means "Sun-Moon".

==== Sarnaism ====
Sarnaism or Sarna (local languages: Sarna Dhorom, meaning "religion of the holy woods") defines the indigenous religions of the Adivasi populations of the states of Central-East India, such as the Munda, the Ho, the Santali, the Khuruk, and the others. The Munda, Ho, Santhal and Oraon tribe followed the Sarna religion, where Sarna means sacred grove. Their religion is based on the oral traditions passed from generation-to-generation. It involves worship of village deity, Sun and Moon.

==== Other tribal animist ====
Animist hunter gatherer Nayaka people of Nilgiri hills of South India.

Animism is the traditional religion of Nicobarese people; their religion is marked by the dominance and interplay with spirit worship, witch doctors and animal sacrifice.

=== Hinduism ===
==== Adivasi roots of modern Hinduism ====
Some historians and anthropologists assert that many Hindu practices might have been adopted from Adivasi culture. This also includes the sacred status of certain animals such as monkeys, cows, fish (matsya), peacocks, cobras (nagas) and elephants and plants such as the sacred fig (pipal), Ocimum tenuiflorum (tulsi) and Azadirachta indica (neem), which may once have held totemic importance for certain adivasi tribes.

==== Adivasi saints ====
A sant is an Indian holy man, and a title of a devotee or ascetic, especially in north and east India. Generally, a holy or saintly person is referred to as a mahatma, paramahamsa, or swami, or given the prefix Sri or Srila before their name. The term is sometimes misrepresented in English as "Hindu saint", although "sant" is unrelated to "saint".

- Sant Dhira or Kannappa Nayanar, one of 63 Nayanar Shaivite sants, a hunter from whom Lord Shiva gladly accepted food offerings. It is said that he poured water from his mouth on the Shivlingam and offered the Lord swine flesh.
- Sant Dhudhalinath, Gujarati, a 17th or 18th-century devotee (P. 4, The Story of Historic People of India-The Kolis)
- Sant Gurudev Kalicharan Brahma or Guru Brahma, a Bodo who founded the Brahma Dharma aimed against Christian missionaries and colonialists. The Brahma Dharma movement sought to unite peoples of all religions to worship God together and survives even today.
- Sant Kalu Dev, Punjab, related with Fishermen community Nishadha
- Sant Kubera, ethnic Gujarati, taught for over 35 years and had 20,000 followers in his time.
- Sant Tirumangai Alvar, Kallar, composed the six Vedangas in beautiful Tamil verse
- Saint Kalean Guru (Kalean Murmu) is the most beloved person among Santal Tribes community who was widely popular 'Nagam Guru' Guru of Early Histories in fourteen century by the references of their forefathers.

==== Sages ====
- Bhakta Shabari, a Nishadha woman who offered Shri Rama and Shri Laxmana her half-eaten ber fruit, which they gratefully accepted when they were searching for Shri Sita Devi in the forest.

==== Maharishis ====
- Maharshi Matanga, Matanga Bhil, Guru of Bhakta Shabari. In fact, Chandalas are often addressed as 'Matanga 'in passages like Varaha Purana 1.139.91

==== Avatars ====
- Kirata – the form of Lord Shiva as a hunter. It is mentioned in the Mahabharata. The Karppillikkavu Sree Mahadeva Temple, Kerala adores Lord Shiva in this avatar and is known to be one of the oldest surviving temples in Bharat.
- Vettakkorumakan, the son of Lord Kirata.
- Kaladutaka or 'Vaikunthanatha', Kallar (robber), avatar of Lord Vishnu.

==== Other Adivasi and Hinduism ====
Some Hindus do not believe that Indian Adivasi are close to the romantic ideal of the ancient silvan culture of the Vedic people. Madhav Sadashiv Golwalkar said:

The tribals "can be given yajñopavîta (...) They should be given equal rights and footings in the matter of religious rights, in temple worship, in the study of Vedas, and in general, in all our social and religious affairs. This is the only right solution for all the problems of casteism found nowadays in our Hindu society."

At the Lingaraja Temple in Bhubaneswar, there are Brahmin and Badu (tribal) priests. The Badus have the most intimate contact with the deity of the temple, and only they can bathe and adorn it.

The Bhils are mentioned in the Mahabharata. Ekalavya considered Darona as his guru, and he had the honour to be invited to Yudhishthira's Rajasuya Yajna at Indraprastha. Indian Adivasi were also part of royal armies in the Ramayana and in the Arthashastra.

Shabari was a Bhil woman who offered Rama and Lakshmana jujubes when they were searching for Sita in the forest. Matanga, a Bhil, became a Brahmana.

==== Brahmanisation and Rajputisation ====
Bhangya Bhukya notes that during the final years of the British Raj, while education introduced Westernisation in the hilly areas of central India, the regions also parallelly underwent the Hinduisation and Rajputisation processes. The Gond people and their chiefs started doing the "caste–Hindu practices" and frequently claimed "Rajput, and thus kshatriya status". The British government used to support these claims as they viewed the Adivasi society to be less civilised than the caste society and believed that Adivasi peoples' association with the castes would make the Adivasis "more civilized and sober" and "easier for the colonial state to control". Bhukya also points out that central India's "Raj Gond families" had already adopted the religious and social traditions of the Rajputs before the British Raj in India, and there were "matrimonial relations" between a number of Gond and Rajput Rajas. However, the British governments' policies of offering "zamindari rights, village headships and patelships" fuelled the process.

According to Patit Paban Mishra, "the 'ksatriyaization' of tribal rulers and their surroundings, resulted in the Hinduization of tribal areas".

=== Demands for a separate religious code ===
Some Adivasi organisations have demanded that a distinct religious code be listed for Adivasis in the 2011 census of India. The All India Adivasi Conference was held on 1 and 2 January 2011 at Burnpur, Asansol, West Bengal. 750 delegates were present from all parts of India and cast their votes for Religion code as follows: Sari Dhorom – 632, Sarna – 51, Kherwalism – 14 and Other Religions – 03. Census of India.

== Education ==
Tribal communities in India are the least educationally developed. First generation learners have to face social, psychological and cultural barriers to get education. This has been one of the reasons for poor performance of tribal students in schools. Poor literacy rate since independence has resulted in absence of Adivasi in academia and higher education. The literacy rate for STs has gone up from 8.5% (male – 13.8%, female – 3.2%) in 1961 to 29.6% (male – 40.6%, female – 18.2%) in 1991 and to 40% (male – 59%, female – 37%) in 1999–2000. States with large proportion of STs like Mizoram, Nagaland and Meghalaya have high literacy rate while states with large number of Adivasi like Madhya Pradesh, Odisha, Rajasthan and Andhra Pradesh have low tribal literacy rate. Tribal students have very high drop-out rates during school education.

Extending the system of primary education into tribal areas and reserving places for needing them, they say, to work in the fields. On the other hand, in those parts of the northeast where tribes have generally been spared the wholesale onslaught of outsiders, schooling has helped Adivasi to secure political and economic benefits. The education system there has provided a corps of highly trained tribal members in the professions and high-ranking administrative posts. tribal children in middle and high schools and higher education institutions are central to government policy, but efforts to improve a tribe's educational status have had mixed results. Recruitment of qualified teachers and determination of the appropriate language of instruction also remain troublesome. Commission after commission on the "language question" has called for instruction, at least at the primary level, in the students' native language. In some regions, tribal children entering school must begin by learning the official regional language, often one completely unrelated to their tribal language.

Many tribal schools are plagued by high drop-out rates. Children attend for the first three to four years of primary school and gain a smattering of knowledge, only to lapse into illiteracy later. Few who enter continue up to the tenth grade; of those who do, few manage to finish high school. Therefore, very few are eligible to attend institutions of higher education, where the high rate of attrition continues. Members of agrarian tribes like the Gonds often are reluctant to send their children to school,

An academy for teaching and preserving Adivasi languages and culture was established in 1999 by the Bhasha Research and Publication Centre. The Adivasi Academy is located at Tejgadh in Gujarat.

== Economy ==
Most tribes are concentrated in heavily forested areas that combine inaccessibility with limited political or economic significance. Historically, the economy of most tribes was subsistence agriculture or hunting and gathering. Tribal members traded with outsiders for the few necessities they lacked, such as salt and iron. A few local Hindu craftsmen might provide such items as cooking utensils.

In the early 20th century, however, large areas fell into the hands of non-Adivasi, on account of improved transportation and communications. Around 1900, many regions were opened by the British government to settlement through a scheme by which inward migrants received ownership of land free in return for cultivating it. For Adivasi, however, land was often viewed as a common resource, free to whoever needed it. By the time Adivasi accepted the necessity of obtaining formal land titles, they had lost the opportunity to lay claim to lands that might rightfully have been considered theirs. The colonial and post-independence regimes belatedly realised the necessity of protecting Adivasi from the predations of outsiders and prohibited the sale of tribal lands. Although an important loophole in the form of land leases was left open, tribes made some gains in the mid-twentieth century, and some land was returned to Adivasis despite obstruction by local police and land officials.

In the 1970s, Adivasis came again under intense land pressure, especially in central India. Migration into tribal lands increased dramatically, as Adivasi lost the titles to their lands in many ways – lease, forfeiture from debts, or bribery of land registry officials. Other non-Adivasi simply squatted or even lobbied governments to classify them as tribal to allow them to compete with the formerly established tribes. In any case, many tribal members became landless labourers in the 1960s and 1970s, and regions that a few years earlier had been the exclusive domain of tribes had an increasingly mixed population of Adivasi and non-Adivasi. Government efforts to evict nontribal members from illegal occupation have proceeded slowly; when evictions occur at all, those ejected are usually members of poor, lower castes.

Improved communications, roads with motorised traffic, and more frequent government intervention figured in the increased contact that Adivasis had with outsiders. Commercial highways and cash crops frequently drew non-Adivasi into remote areas. By the 1960s and 1970s, the resident nontribal shopkeeper was a permanent feature of many tribal villages. Since shopkeepers often sell goods on credit (demanding high interest), many tribal members have been drawn deeply into debt or mortgaged their land. Merchants also encourage Adivasi to grow cash crops (such as cotton or castor-oil plants), which increases tribal dependence on the market for necessities. Indebtedness is so extensive that although such transactions are illegal, traders sometimes 'sell' their debtors to other merchants, much like indentured peons.

The final blow for some tribes has come when non-Adivasi, through political jockeying, have managed to gain legal tribal status, that is, to be listed as a Scheduled Tribe.

Tribes in the Himalayan foothills have not been as hard-pressed by the intrusions of non-tribal. Historically, their political status was always distinct from the rest of India. Until the British colonial period, there was little effective control by any of the empires centred in peninsular India; the region was populated by autonomous feuding tribes. The British, in efforts to protect the sensitive northeast frontier, followed a policy dubbed the "Inner Line"; non-Adivasi were allowed into the areas only with special permission. Post-colonial governments have continued the policy, protecting the Himalayan tribes as part of the strategy to secure the border with China.

=== Ecological threats ===
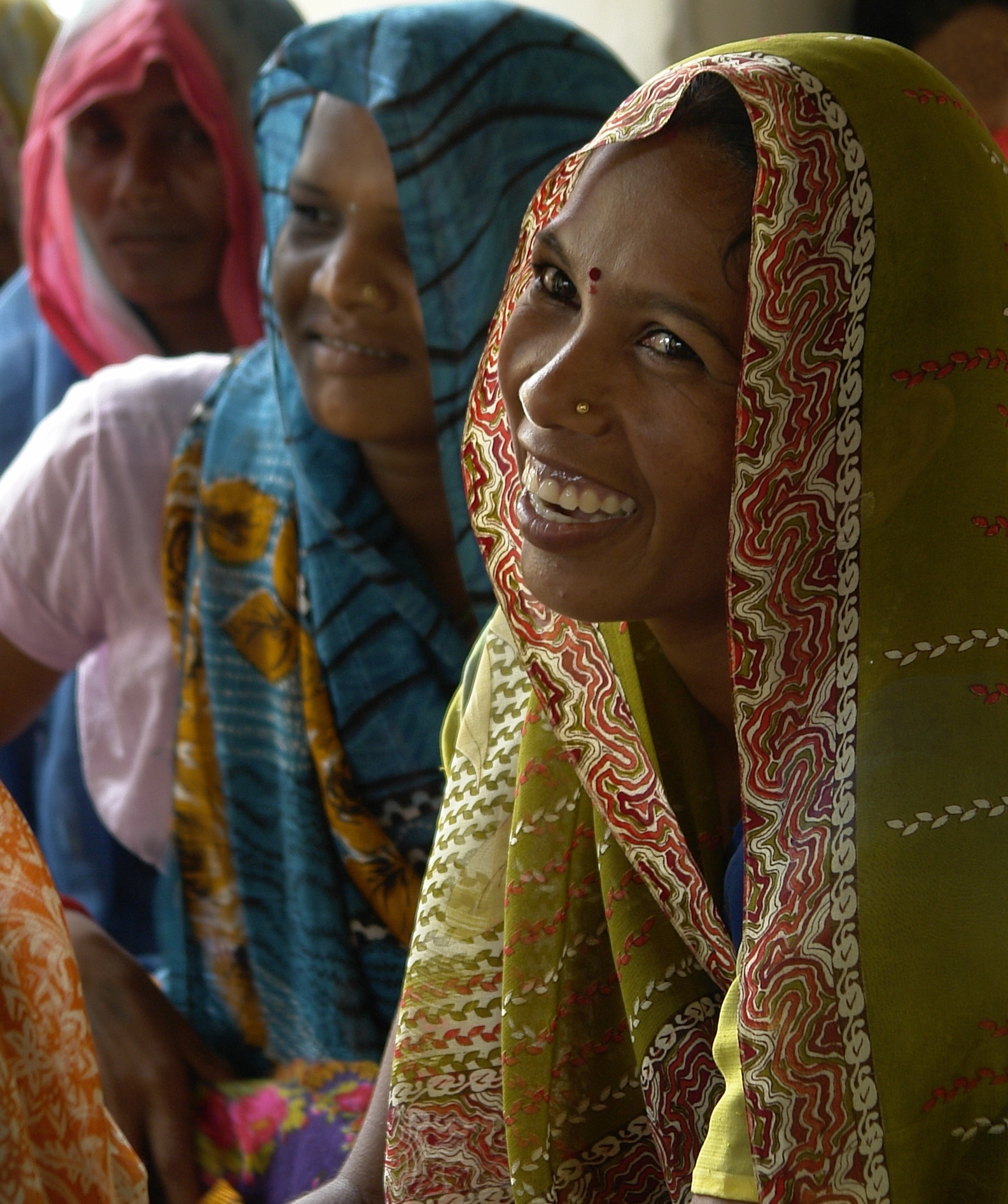
Women in a tribal (Gond adivasi) village, Umaria district, India. Picture taken during a meeting organised by Ekta Parishad about land rights, the main grievance of the Adivasi people.

Many smaller tribal groups are quite sensitive to ecological degradation caused by modernisation. Both commercial forestry and intensive agriculture have proved destructive to the forests that had endured swidden agriculture for many centuries. Adivasis in central part of India have been victims of the Salwa Judum campaign by the Government against the Naxalite insurgency.

Government policies on forest reserves have affected Adivasis profoundly. Government efforts to reserve forests have precipitated armed (if futile) resistance on the part of the Adivasis involved. Intensive exploitation of forests has often meant allowing outsiders to cut large areas of trees (while the original tribal inhabitants were restricted from cutting), and ultimately replacing mixed forests capable of sustaining tribal life with single-product plantations. Non-Adivasi have frequently bribed local officials to secure the effective use of reserved forest lands.

The northern tribes have thus been sheltered from the kind of exploitation that those elsewhere in South Asia have suffered. In Arunachal Pradesh (formerly part of the North-East Frontier Agency), for example, tribal members control commerce and most lower-level administrative posts. Government construction projects in the region have provided tribes with a significant source of cash. Some tribes have made rapid progress through the education system (the role of early missionaries was significant in this regard). Instruction was begun in Assamese but was eventually changed to Hindi; by the early 1980s, English was taught at most levels. Northeastern Adivasi have thus enjoyed a certain measure of social mobility.

The continuing economic alienation and exploitation of many adivasis was highlighted as a "systematic failure" by the Indian prime minister Manmohan Singh in a 2009 conference of chief ministers of all 29 Indian states, where he also cited this as a major cause of the Naxalite unrest that has affected areas such as the Red Corridor.

== Issue and politics ==
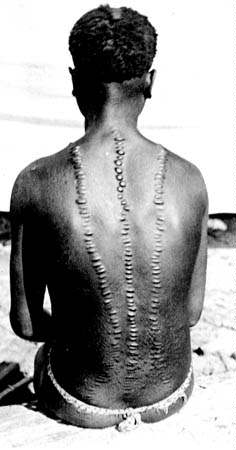
Scarification, a traditional symbol of Great Andamanese tribal identity (1901 photo)

The criteria presently followed for specification of a community as a Scheduled Tribe are : (i) indications of primitive traits, (ii) distinctive culture, (iii) geographical isolation, (iv) shyness of contact with the community at large, and (v) backwardness.

Population complexities, and the controversies surrounding ethnicity and language in India, sometimes make the official recognition of groups as Adivasis (by way of inclusion in the Scheduled Tribes list) political and contentious. However, regardless of their language family affiliations, tribal groups that have survived as distinct forest, mountain or island-dwelling tribes in India and are often classified as Adivasi. The relatively autonomous tribal groups of Northeastern India (including Khasis, Apatani and Nagas), who are mostly Austro-Asiatic or Tibeto-Burman speakers, are also considered to be Adivasi: this area comprises 7.5% of India's land area but 20% of its tribal population. However, not all autonomous northeastern groups are considered Adivasi; for instance, the Tibeto-Burman-speaking Meitei of Manipur were once tribal but, having been settled for many centuries, are caste Hindus.

It is also difficult, for a given social grouping, to definitively decide whether it is a "caste" or a "tribe". A combination of internal social organisation, relationship with other groups, self-classification and perception by other groups has to be taken into account to make a categorisation, which is at best inexact and open to doubt. These categorisations have been diffused for thousands of years, and even ancient formulators of caste-discriminatory legal codes (which usually only applied to settled populations, and not Adivasis) were unable to come up with clean distinctions.

=== Demands for tribal classification ===
The additional difficulty in deciding whether a group meets the criteria to be Adivasi or not are the aspirational movements created by the federal and state benefits, including job and educational reservations, enjoyed by groups listed as scheduled tribes (STs). In Manipur, Meitei commentators have pointed to the lack of scheduled tribe status as a key economic disadvantage for Meiteis competing for jobs against groups that are classified as scheduled tribes. In Assam, Rajbongshi representatives have demanded scheduled tribe status as well. In Rajasthan, the Gujjar community has demanded ST status, even blockading the national capital of Delhi to press their demand. However, the Government of Rajasthan declined the Gujjars' demand, stating the Gujjars are treated as upper caste and are by no means a tribe. In several cases, these claims to tribalhood are disputed by tribes who are already listed in the schedule and fear economic losses if more powerful groups are recognised as scheduled tribes; for instance, the Rajbongshi demand faces resistance from the Bodo tribe, and the Meena tribe has vigorously opposed Gujjar aspirations to be recognised as a scheduled tribe.

=== Endogamy, exogamy and ethnogenesis ===
Part of the challenge is that the endogamous nature of tribes is also conformed to by the vast majority of Hindu castes. Indeed, many historians and anthropologists believe that caste endogamy reflects the once-tribal origins of the various groups who now constitute the settled Hindu castes. Another defining feature of caste Hindu society, which is often used to contrast them with Muslim and other social groupings, is lineage/clan (or gotra) and village exogamy. However, these in-marriage taboos are also held ubiquitously among tribal groups, and do not serve as reliable differentiating markers between caste and tribe. Again, this could be an ancient import from tribal society into settled Hindu castes. Tribes such as the Muslim Gujjars of Kashmir and the Kalash of Pakistan observe these exogamous traditions in common with caste Hindus and non-Kashmiri adivasis, though their surrounding Muslim populations do not.

Adivasi are not part of the caste system. Some anthropologists, however, draw a distinction between tribes who have continued to be tribal and tribes that have been absorbed into caste society in terms of the breakdown of tribal (and therefore caste) boundaries, and the proliferation of new mixed caste groups. In other words, ethnogenesis (the construction of new ethnic identities) in tribes occurs through a fission process (where groups splinter-off as new tribes, which preserves endogamy), whereas with settled castes it usually occurs through intermixture (in violation of strict endogamy).

Adivasi and are often regarded as constituting egalitarian societies. However, many scholars argue that the claim that Adivasi are an egalitarian society in contrast to a caste-based society is a part of a larger political agenda by some to maximise any differences from tribal and urban societies. According to scholar Koenraad Elst, caste practices and social taboos among Indian Adivasi date back to antiquity:

The Munda tribals not only practise tribal endogamy and commensality, but also observe a jâti division within the tribe, buttressed by notions of social pollution, a mythological explanation and harsh punishments.

=== Other criteria ===
Unlike castes, which form part of a complex and interrelated local economic exchange system, tribes tend to form self-sufficient economic units. For most Adivasi, land-use rights traditionally derive simply from tribal membership. Tribal society tends to the egalitarian, with its leadership based on ties of kinship and personality rather than on hereditary status. Tribes typically consist of segmentary lineages whose extended families provide the basis for social organisation and control. Tribal religion recognises no authority outside the tribe.

Any of these criteria may not apply in specific instances. Language does not always give an accurate indicator of tribal or caste status. Especially in regions of mixed population, many tribal groups have lost their original languages and simply speak local or regional languages. In parts of Assam—an area historically divided between warring tribes and villages—increased contact among villagers began during the colonial period, and has accelerated since independence in 1947. A pidgin Assamese developed, whereas educated tribal members learnt Hindi and, in the late twentieth century, English.

Self-identification and group loyalty do not provide unfailing markers of tribal identity either. In the case of stratified tribes, the loyalties of clan, kin, and family may well predominate over those of tribe. In addition, tribes cannot always be viewed as people living apart; the degree of isolation of various tribes has varied tremendously. The Gonds, Santals, and Bhils traditionally have dominated the regions in which they have lived. Moreover, tribal society is not always more egalitarian than the rest of the rural populace; some of the larger tribes, such as the Gonds, are highly stratified.

The apparently wide fluctuation in estimates of South Asia's tribal population through the twentieth century gives a sense of how unclear the distinction between tribal and nontribal can be. India's 1931 census enumerated 22 million Adivasi, in 1941 only 10 million were counted, but by 1961 some 30 million and in 1991 nearly 68 million tribal members were included. The differences among the figures reflect changing census criteria and the economic incentives individuals have to maintain or reject classification as a tribal member.

These gyrations of census data serve to underline the complex relationship between caste and tribe. Although, in theory, these terms represent different ways of life and ideal types, in reality, they stand for a continuum of social groups. In areas of substantial contact between tribes and castes, social and cultural pressures have often tended to move tribes in the direction of becoming castes over a period of years. Adivasis with ambitions for social advancement in Indian society at large have tried to gain the classification of caste for their tribes. On occasion, an entire tribe or part of a tribe joined a Hindu sect and thus entered the caste system en masse. If a specific tribe engaged in practices that Hindus deemed polluting, the tribe's status when it was assimilated into the caste hierarchy would be affected.

=== Constitutional safeguards for Scheduled Tribes ===
A number of constitutional and juridical safeguards for Adivasi have been encoded. (Note: Educational & Cultural Safeguards: The Hindu Marriage Act is not applicable to the members of the Scheduled Tribe as per Section 2(2) of the Hindu Marriage Act. If that be so, the directions issued by the Family Court under Section 9 of the Hindu Marriage Act is not applicable to the appellant."; Art. 15(4) – Special provisions for advancement of other backward classes (which includes STs); Art. 29 – Protection of Interests of Minorities (which includes STs); Art. 46 – The State shall promote, with special care, the educational and economic interests of the weaker sections of the people, and in particular, of the Scheduled Castes, and the Scheduled Tribes, and shall protect them from social injustice and all forms of exploitation, Art. 350 – Right to conserve distinct Language, Script or Culture; Art. 350 – Instruction in Mother Tongue.; Social Safeguard: Art. 23 – Prohibition of traffic in human beings and beggar and other similar form of forced labour; Art. 24 – Forbidding Child Labour.; Economic Safeguards: Art.244 – Clause(1) Provisions of Fifth Schedule shall apply to the administration & control of the Scheduled Areas and Scheduled Tribes in any State other than the states of Assam, Meghalaya, Mizoram and Tripura which are covered under Sixth Schedule, under Clause * (2) of this Article.; Art. 275 – Grants in-Aid to specified States (STs &SAs) covered under Fifth and Sixth Schedules of the Constitution.; Political Safeguards: Art.164 (1) – Provides for Tribal Affairs Ministers in Bihar, MP and Orissa; Art. 330 – Reservation of seats for STs in Lok Sabha; Art. 332 – Reservation of seats for STs in State Legislatures; Art. 334 – 10 years period for reservation (amended several times to extend the period); Art. 243 – Reservation of seats in Panchayats; Art. 371 – Special provisions in respect of NE States and Sikkim; Fifth and Sixth schedules of Indian constitution; Safeguards under Various laws: The Scheduled Castes and Scheduled Tribes (Prevention of Atrocities) Act,1989 and the Rules 1995 framed there under.; Bonded Labour System (Abolition) Act 1976 (in respect of Scheduled Tribes); The Child Labour (Prohibition and Regulation) Act1986; States Acts & Regulations concerning alienation & restoration of land belonging to STs; Forest Conservation Act 1980; Forests Right's Act 2006; Panchayatiraj (Extension to Scheduled Areas) Act 1996; Minimum Wages Act 1948.)

=== Particularly vulnerable tribal groups ===
The Scheduled Tribe groups who were identified as more isolated from the wider community and who maintain a distinctive cultural identity have been categorised as "Particularly Vulnerable Tribal Groups" (PVTGs) previously known as Primitive Tribal Groups by the Government at the centre. So far 75 tribal communities have been identified as 'particularly vulnerable tribal groups' in 18 States and UT of Andaman & Nicobar Islands of India. These hunting, food-gathering, and some agricultural communities have been identified as less acculturated tribes among the tribal population groups and in need of special programmes for their sustainable development. The tribes are awakening and demanding their rights for special reservation quota for them.

== See also ==
- Chakma
- C. K. Janu
- Chhotanagpur Front
- Chhotanagpur Plateau Praja Parishad
- Eklavya Model Residential School
- Great Andamanese
- Hanumappa Sudarshan
- India tribal belt
- Jarawa people (Andaman Islands)
- Krantikari Mukti Morcha
- Kumar Suresh Singh
- List of indigenous peoples of South Asia
- List of Scheduled Tribes in India
- Patalkot
- Shompen people
- Tribal religions in India

== Sources ==
- Basu, Analabha; Sarkar-Roya, Neeta; Majumder, Partha P. (9 February 2016), "Genomic reconstruction of the history of extant populations of India reveals five distinct ancestral components and a complex structure", Proceedings of the National Academy of Sciences of the United States of America, 113 (6): 1594–1599, Bibcode:2016PNAS..113.1594B, doi:10.1073/pnas.1513197113, PMC 4760789, PMID 26811443
- Karlsson, Bengt T.; Subba, T.B., eds. (2006). Indigeneity In India. Routledge. doi:10.4324/9780203041048. ISBN 978-0-203-04104-8.
- De, Debasree (2025). Indigenous Peoples and the Politics of Indigeneity in India: A Local Perspective on a Global Movement. People, Cultures and Societies: Exploring and Documenting Diversities. Singapore: Springer Nature Singapore. doi:10.1007/978-981-96-3632-7. ISBN 978-981--963631-0.
- Narasimhan, Vagheesh M.; Patterson, N.J.; et al. (2019), "The Formation of Human Populations in South and Central Asia", Science, 365 (6457) eaat7487, Bibcode:2019Sci...365t7487N, doi:10.1126/science.aat7487, hdl:10278/3722735, PMC 6822619, PMID 31488661, archived from the original on 29 December 2020
- Reich, David; Thangaraj, Kumarasamy; Patterson, Nick; Price, Alkes L.; Singh, Lalji (2009), "Reconstructing Indian population history", Nature, 461 (7263): 489–494, Bibcode:2009Natur.461..489R, doi:10.1038/nature08365, ISSN 0028-0836, PMC 2842210, PMID 19779445
- Rycroft, Daniel J.; Dasgupta, Sangeeta, eds. (29 March 2011). The Politics of Belonging in India: Becoming Adivasi. Taylor & Francis. ISBN 978-1-136-79115-4.
