= KSY =

KSY or ksy may refer to:

- KSY, the IATA code for Kars Harakani Airport, Turkey
- ksy, the ISO 639-3 code for Kharia Thar language, India
- Kadhalil Sodhappuvadhu Yeppadi, a 2012 Indian film
