= Papiya =

Papiya is an Indian given name. Papiya may refer to:

== People ==
- Papiya Adhikari, Indian actress
- Papiya Ghosh, Indian historian, academic
- Papiya Sengupta, Indian television actress

== Other ==
- Papiya Nunatak, a rocky hill in Graham Land, Antarctica
