= Archana Soreng =

Indian environment activist (born 1996)

- Born: 1995 or 1996 (age 30–31); Rajgangpur, Sundergarh, Odisha, India
- Education: Patna Women's College; Tata Institute of Social Sciences (TISS)
- Occupations: Research officer, activist
- Organization: Vasundhara Odisha
- Known for: Environmental activism
- Parents: Bijay Kumar Soreng (father); Usha Kerketta (mother)
- Website: www.vasundharaodisha.org

Archana Soreng (born 1995 or 1996) is an environmental activist belonging to the indigenous Kharia Tribe from Bihabandh Village of Rajgangpur in Sundergarh, Odisha, India. She has been working for awareness about climate change and documentation, preservation, and promotion of the traditional knowledge and practices of indigenous communities.

In August 202, Soreng was selected as one of the seven members of Youth Advisory Group on Climate Change established by the Secretary-General of the United Nations as a part of Youth2030 Strategy.

== Early life and education ==
Archana Soreng was born in 1995 or 1996, and grew up in the Bihabandh Village of Rajgangpur in Sundergarh, Odisha, India. She is from the Khadia Tribe.

She graduated from Patna Women's College and later went on to earn her master's degree from the Tata Institute of Social Sciences in regulatory governance, where she was also the president of the students' union.

== Activism ==
Soreng first began to get involved in activism after her father's death. She has been working for awareness about climate change and documentation, preservation, and promotion of the traditional knowledge and practices of indigenous communities.

Soreng is the former National Convener of Tribal Commission, also known as Adivasi Yuva Chetna Manch, one of the initiatives of the All India Catholic University Federation (AICUF). She is also active in the Indian Catholic Youth Movement.

In August 2020, Soreng was selected as one of the seven members of Youth Advisory Group on Climate Change established by the Secretary-General of the United Nations as a part of UN Youth Strategy.

As of November 2021 she was working as a research officer at Vasundhara Odisha, a policy advocacy organisation in Bhubaneswar.
