= Patna Women's College =

College in Bihar

- Type: Undergraduate and Postgraduate College
- Established: 1940 (85 years ago)
- Chancellor: Governor of Bihar
- Vice-Chancellor: Prof. Dr KC Sinha
- Principal: Dr. Sister M. Rashmi A.C
- Location: Patna, Bihar, India; 25.6114°N 85.1249°E
- Campus: Urban
- Affiliations: Patna University
- Website: patnawomenscollege.in

Patna Women's College, established in 1940, is a women's college in Patna, Bihar. It is affiliated to Patna University, and offers undergraduate and postgraduate courses in science, arts, commerce and vocational.

== Accreditation ==
Patna Women's College was awarded A++ grade by the National Assessment and Accreditation Council (NAAC).

== Notable alumni ==
- Papiya Ghosh, Noted Historian
- Dipali, Indian Idol Fame
- Archana Soreng, Indian Environmental Activist
