= Kharia people =

Austroasiatic speaking ethnic group from India

Kharia
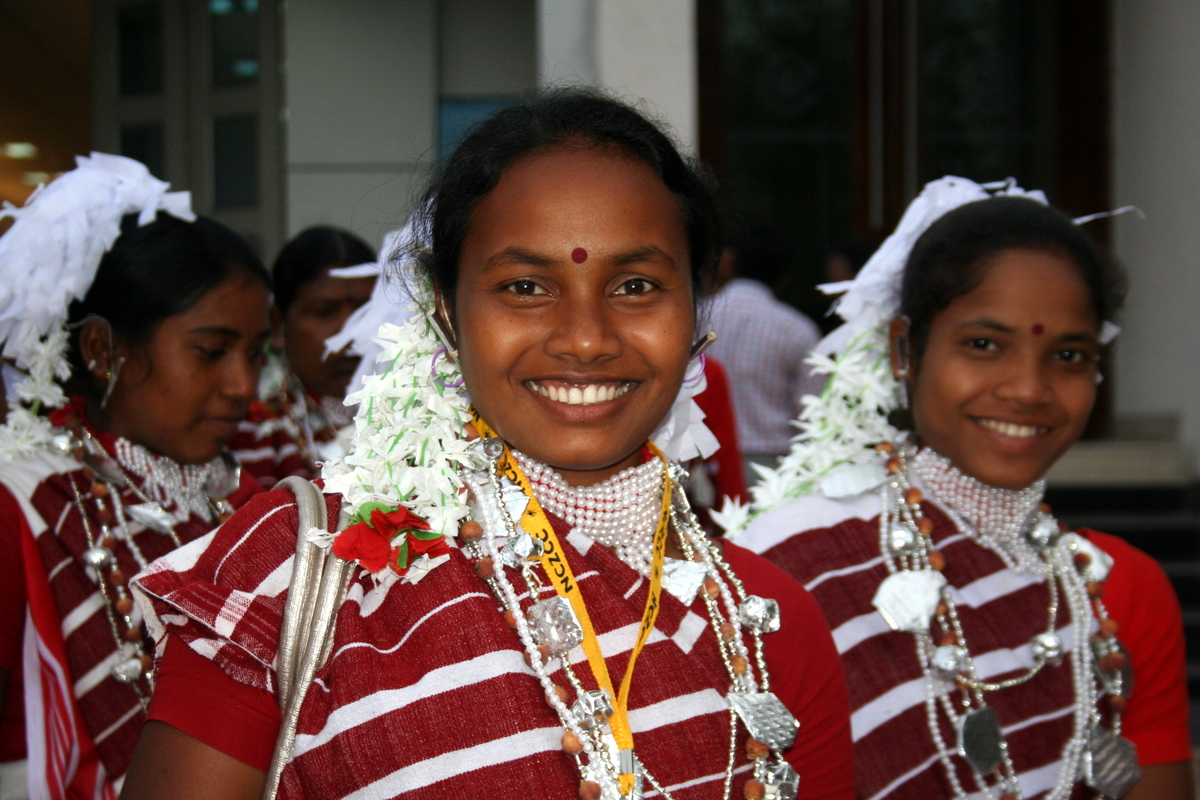
- Kharia women in traditional dress

Total population
- 482,754 (2011)

Regions with significant populations
- India
- Odisha: 222,844
- Jharkhand: 196,135
- West Bengal: 108,707 (Note: population clustered with the Lodhas)
- Chhattisgarh: 49,032
- Bihar: 11,569
- Madhya Pradesh: 2,429
- Tripura: 1,409

Languages
- Kharia; Kharia Thar; Odia; Sadri

Religion
- Christianity, Hinduism, Sarnaism

Related ethnic groups
- Other Munda peoples

The Kharia are an Austroasiatic tribal ethnic group from east-central India. They speak the Kharia language, which belongs to Munda branch of Austroasiatic languages. They are sub-divided into three groups known as the Hill Kharia, Delki Kharia and the Dudh Kharia. Among them, the Dudh Kharia is the most educated community.

== History ==
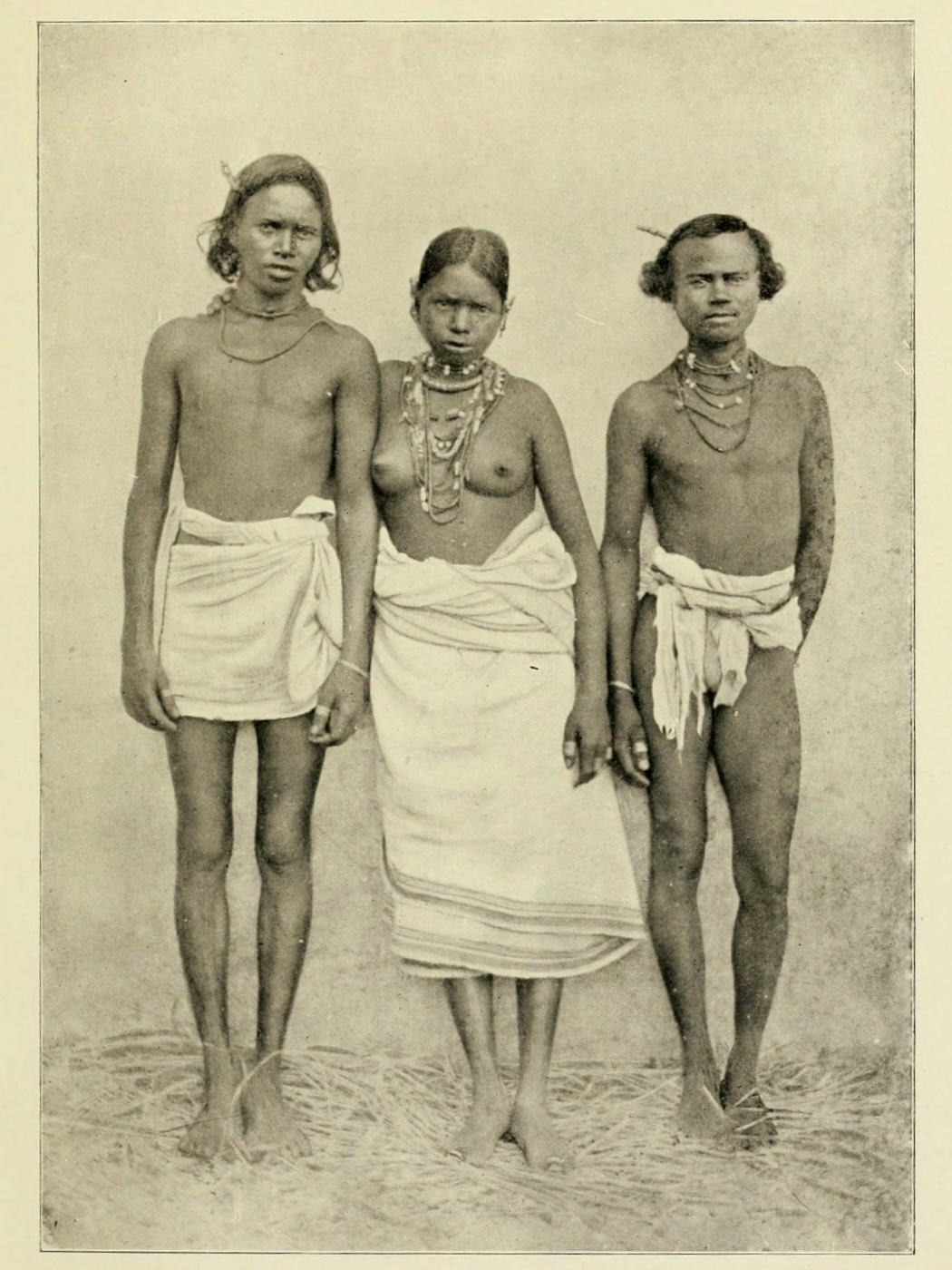
A photograph of Kharia people in Ranchi, 1903

According to linguist Paul Sidwell, Munda languages arrived on the coast of Odisha from Southeast Asia about 4000–3500 years ago. The Austroasiatic language speaker spread from Southeast Asia and mixed extensively with local Indian populations.

== Social divisions ==
The Kharia comprise three tribes, the Dudh Kharia, Dhelki Kharia, and Hill Kharia. The first two speak an Austroasiatic language, Kharia, but the Hill Kharia have switched to an Indo-Aryan language, Kharia Thar. There has not been any language development efforts made for Kharia Tar.

The Dudh Kharia and Dhelki Kharia formed together one compact tribe. These Kharia people were attacked by an Ahir chief and then moved on to the Chota Nagpur Plateau.

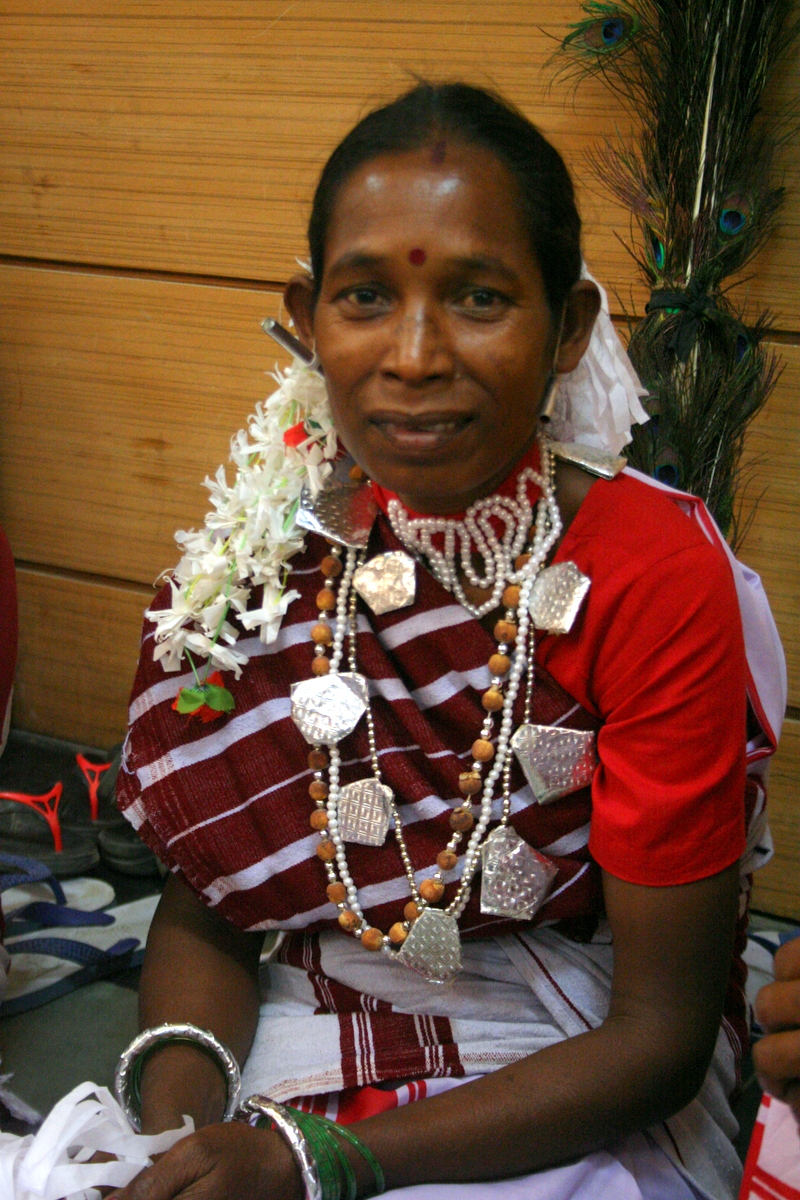
Kharia tribal woman

In Odisha, the Hill Kharia are mainly found in Jashipur and Karanjia Blocks of Mayurbhanj district. A few villages are also found in Morada block. In Jharkhand, they are concentrated in East Singhbhum, Gumla, Simdega districts. Though widely found in this district, Musabani, Dumaria and Chakulia Blocks are the blocks where they live in large numbers. And in West Bengal, they are in West Midnapur, Bankura and Purulia districts. The majority are in Purulia.

The Hill Kharia are also called Pahari (meaning “Hill”) Kharia, Savara/Sabar, Kheria, Erenga, or Pahar. Outsiders call them Kharia but they call themselves as Sabar. They are called “Pahari (Hill) Kharia” because they live in the midst of forest and depend upon forest produces.

The Hill Kharia community encompasses various gotras (clans), including Alkosi, Baa, Bhunia, Bilung, Dhar, Digar, Dolai, Dungdung, Gidi, Golgo, Kerketta, Kharmoi, Khiladi, Kiro, Kotal, Kullu, Laha, Nago, Pichria, Rai, Sal, Saddar, Sandi, Sikari, Soreng, Suya, Tesa, Tete, and Tolong. Among these, the Bilung clan appears to hold prominence.

Dhelki kharia clans:-

1. Mudhu ((Nayak)
2. Samad ( Dandsena)￼
3. Hasda ( Pradhan)
4. ￼Suren (Manjhi)
5. ￼Charhat
6. Baghe/ Baghwar
7. Moil
8. Topno
9. Lugun

== Distribution ==
They mainly inhabit Jharkhand, Madhya Pradesh, Odisha and West Bengal, Maharashtra. In Tripura. Few families can be found in Assam and Andaman Islands. According to 1981 census, their population in Bihar (now mostly Jharkhand) is 141,771, in Odisha it is 144,178, and in Madhya Pradesh it is 6892.

== Culture ==
=== Lifestyle ===
The Kharia who were under zamindars during British rule are now land owning farmers in independent India. All Kharia speak their traditional dialect. The Language spoken by them is a part of the Munda Languages, which are part of the Austroasiatic languages. They are very close to the nature and culture of the tribe is influenced by its ecological and cultural surroundings.

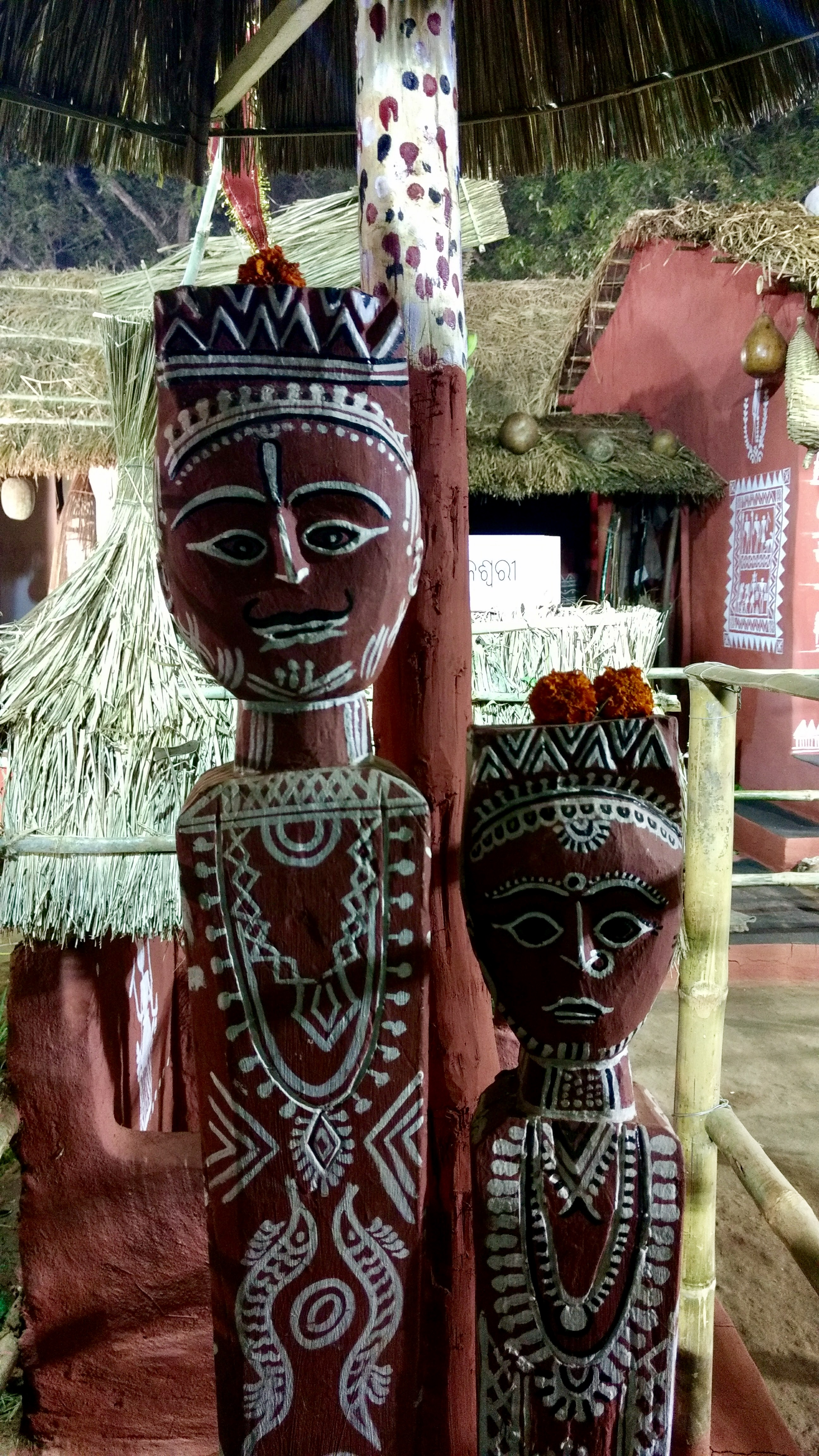
Roadside gods of the Hill Kharia Tribe

=== Dress ===
The Hill Kharia have preserved their traditional dress pattern and rest of the Kharia have been influenced by the modern contacts and changed their dressing style. Traditionally, they wear Dhoti called Bhagwan. women wear saree falling up to the ankles. A part of the saree covers their bosom. The traditional dress is nowadays going out of use. Both men and women wear ornaments generally made of Brass, Nickel, Aluminium, Silver and rarely of Gold. Dudh Kharia women prefer Gold ornaments.

=== Economy ===
Different levels of economic developments on sectional basis exist among Kharia. The Hill Kharia is a food gathering, hunting and labourer community. The Dhelkis are agricultural labourers and agriculturalists, while Dudh Kharia are exclusively agriculturists in their primary economy.

Kharia people are skilled in cottage industries.

=== Religion ===
According to the 2011 Census on Kharias in all states of India, 46.1% are Christians, followed by 43.4% Hindus and Sarnas. Minor populations follow Islam, Buddhism, Jainism, Sikhism and other religions.

=== Dances ===
Kharia are said to be the great dancers. Youth of both sexes dance together. sometimes they form two groups each of males and females and sing one after the other. It is like a conversation is going on between boys and girls in the form of the song.

The following dance patterns are prevalent among Kharias: Hario, Kinbhar, Halka, Kudhing and Jadhura.

A Kharia Yo-Yo Daay Durang dance song

A Kharia bidaai (bridal farewell) song

== Notable people ==
- Gladson Dungdung, tribal right activist
- Sylvanus Dung Dung, hockey player
- Rose Kerketta, writer
- Telanga Kharia, freedom fighter
- Jyoti Sunita Kullu, hockey player
- Archana Soreng, Activist
- Salima Tete, hockey player
