= Bhangya Bhukya =

Indian historian

Bhangya Bhukya is an Indian historian and a public intellectual who has made a significant contribution to the study of Banjara and Gond tribes of India. He is the author of several books including Subjugated Nomads: The Lambadas Under the Rule of the Nizams (2010) and Roots of the Periphery: A History of the Gonds of Deccan India (2017).

== Career ==
He is Professor of History at the University of Hyderabad. He has served as associate professor at the English and Foreign Languages University, Hyderabad, and as assistant professor at Osmania University, Hyderabad. Dr Bhukya has specialized in modern Indian history and his work focuses on the history of subaltern and marginalized groups. He did his MA and MPhil from University of Hyderabad, India, and his PhD from the University of Warwick, UK, on a Ford Foundation International Fellowship. His opinion pieces published in several platforms like The Wire (India), The Indian Express and The Quint.

== Bibliography ==
- A Cultural History of Telangana: From the Earliest Times to 1724 AD (2017) Orient Blackswan
- History of Modern Telangana Orient Blackswan (2017)
- The Roots of the Periphery. A History of the Gonds of Deccan India (2017) Oxford University Press
- Colonialism and Its Nomads in South India (2012) Nehru Memorial Museum and Library
- Subjugated Nomads: The Lambadas under the Rule of the Nizams (2010) Orient Blackswan
- The Lambadas: A Community Besieged (2002)
