= Papiya Ghosh =

Indian historian

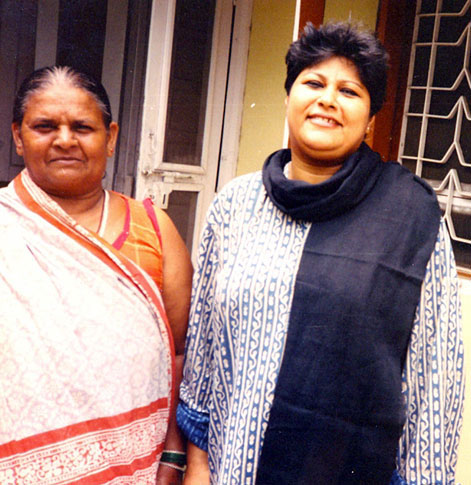
- Papiya Ghosh (right) and Malti Devi (left)
- Born: 8 October 1953; Dumka, Bihar, India
- Died: 3 December 2006 (aged 53); Patna, Bihar, India
- Occupation: Historian

Papiya Ghosh was a historian of South Asian history and a professor of the University of Patna, Patna, India. She was found murdered on 3 December 2006, along with her elderly housemaid, Malti Devi, apparently as a result of an attempted burglary.

Ghosh, an ethnic Bengali, was the sister of Tuktuk Kumar, an officer of Indian Administrative Service from the West Bengal cadre, and a close associate of the writer Jug Suraiya from the Times of India.

== Life ==
Papiya Ghosh was born on 8 October 1953, in Dumka (Bihar, India). She was the third of four daughters of Ujjal Kumar Ghosh, an IAS officer of the Bihar Cadre, and his wife Purnima Ghosh. Her father was a victim of what was widely held to be a political murder in 1957. The four sisters were subsequently brought up by their mother, who took up a job as a school teacher to support her daughters after the murder of her husband.

Papiya attended St Joseph's Convent High School in Patna, where she was school topper and elected Head Girl in 1971. She earned an undergraduate degree in history from the Patna Women's College (Patna University) and was also elected Premier of the Students' Union. Papiya was an avid debater, dramatist and writer from an early age, and, together with her sister Tuktuk, became something of a household name as a regular contributor to Kookie Kol, a column in the Junior Statesman, which was a popular youth magazine of the time.

As Patna University was closed down indefinitely in 1975 during Jayaprakash Narayan's agitation, Papiya Ghosh moved to Delhi University where she completed her MPhil and PhD, studying the pre-independence civil disobedience movement in Bihar (1930–34). After her PhD, she taught history at Delhi University for two years. In 1979, she decided to move back to Patna. This was in part to support her mother, who was by then living on her own, but also because she wanted to live and work in the midst of the land, people and society which formed the main focus of her academic research.

In Patna, Papiya taught first at Patna Women's College and then at the history department at Patna University. A highly regarded teacher, she went to great lengths to ensure that the content and quality of instruction her students received was at par with the best universities in the country. This was especially challenging given the general decline of standards at Patna University, the very limited funding available, deteriorating facilities, and official indifference.

Professional recognition was hard to come by, given the situation in Patna and its remoteness from the more high-profile academic centres of India. Nevertheless, she was awarded the prestigious Rockefeller Foundation Fellowship (twice), as well as fellowships from the Indian Institute of Advanced Study (Shimla) and Teen Murti Bhavan (New Delhi). She also contributed a number of scholarly articles to prestigious academic journals.

A follower of the philosopher Rumi, Papiya Ghosh was drawn towards Sufi mysticism, which she saw as a unique amalgam of influences truly representative the assimilative culture of the Indian sub-continent. She also had a keen interest in modern literature, especially writings by and about Indian and Pakistani women.

== Murder ==
Papiya Ghosh was murdered on the night of 2/3 December 2006, along with her elderly maid, Malti Devi. The post-mortem report listed 34 stab wounds inflicted on her, including to the eyes, throat and stomach. Of the six men accused on the murder, four have been arrested, tried and convicted and two of the named accused, who were absconding, have since been arrested in August 2012 by Bihar Police. However, the trial in their case has yet to commence.

== Work ==
After her PhD, Papiya Ghosh taught history at Daulat Ram College (Delhi University) briefly, and then at the Hindu College, University of Delhi for two years. In 1979, she moved back to Patna, where she taught at her alma mater, Patna Women's College (Patna University), until 1991. She was subsequently promoted and moved to the Department of History, Patna University.

Her research subjects related, inter-alia, to the impact of Partition in 1947, the plight of Dalit Muslims, peoples' movements, popular syncretic culture, secularism, the contribution of the underprivileged to political processes etc. She was particularly interested in questions of identity, especially how people identify themselves individually and collectively when removed from their place of origin. She spent much of her time travelling to remote areas, meeting key sources (within and outside the country), and conducting first-hand primary research using her own limited resources. She would devote hours on translation, roping in friends and well-wishers to help. She taught herself to read and write Urdu, as many of the manuscripts she studied were written in the Nastaliq script. She immersed herself in local traditions (many obscure, some dying out) and was also a keen student of diasporic sub-continental populations, both contemporary (such as the Bangladeshi population in London) and historical (such as in Mauritius and the West Indies).

She was:

- Rockefeller Fellow at the University of Chicago, 1994;
- Rockefeller Fellow at the Triangle South Asia Consortium at North Carolina State University, 1996–97;
- Fellow at the Indian Institute of Advanced Study, Shimla (India), 1993–96
- Visiting Scholar at the Nehru Memorial Museum and Library, Teen Murti Bhavan, New Delhi, 1988–91;
- Adviser to the Asian Development Research Institute, Patna; and
- Visiting Scholar at the Centre for Historical Studies, Jawaharlal Nehru University, New Delhi.

== Books ==
- Ghosh, Papiya (2010). Muhajirs and the Nation: Bihar in the 1940s. New Delhi: Routledge. ISBN 978-0-415-54458-0.
- Ghosh, Papiya (2008). The Civil Disobedience Movement in Bihar. New Delhi: Manak. p. 290. ISBN 978-81-7827-000-5.
- Ghosh, Papiya (2008). Community and Nation: Essays on Identity and Politics in Eastern India. New York: Oxford University Press, USA. ISBN 978-0-19-569300-3. Collected Essays
- Ghosh, Papiya (2007). Partition and the South Asian diaspora: Extending the Subcontinent. New York: Routledge. ISBN 978-0-415-42409-7.

Details of other publications are available at https://web.archive.org/web/20090627075058/http://www.papiyaghosh.com/. The Nobel laureate Amartya Sen released a commemorative volume in Papiya Ghosh's memory – Resurrection of the State, A Saga of Bihar – on 4 February 2013 in Patna. The volume is edited by Sunita Lall and Shaibal Gupta.

== Memorials ==
The following awards have been instituted in Papiya Ghosh's name by the Purnujjal Papiya Ghosh Memorial Trust:

- Patna Women's College, Patna University, for the Topper in BA History
- Department of History, Patna University, for the Topper in MA History
- Hindu College, Delhi University, for the Topper in MA History
- The Professor Papiya Ghosh National Award, instituted by the Indian History Congress
- The Papiya Ghosh Memorial Prize for the best MPhil Thesis in Development Studies, at Oxford University
- A Memorial Fund for PhD and Short Term fellowships in Papiya Ghosh's memory has been set up at the Centre for Studies in Social Sciences, Calcutta, for young women academicians from non-metropolitan areas of the country. This has been supported by, among others, the Dorabji Tata Trust, and friends and family of Papiya Ghosh.
- The Syndicate of Patna University has approved, on 3 May 2007, the setting up of the Papiya Ghosh Centre for Gender Studies to promote research in this area.
