= Nishadha kingdom =

Ancient Indian tribe

The Nishada (IAST: Niṣāda) was a tribe of ancient India that lived in a country of the same name.

== History ==
Veerasena was a king of the Nishada kingdom, and the father of Nala. Nala, the son of Veerasena, became the king after his father. He was the husband of Damayanti, and their story is told in the Mahabharata. Their story is also told in Shriharsha's Sanskrit epic named Naishadha Charita.

== See also ==
- Nala and Damayanti
