= Kharia Thar language =

Indic language of India

Kharia Thar
- Native to: India, also Nepal
- Region: Jharkhand, Orissa and West Bengal states
- Ethnicity: Hill Kharia
- Native speakers: 25,000 (2007)
- Language family: Indo-European: Indo-Iranian; Indo-Aryan; Eastern; Bengali–Assamese; Kharia Thar

Language codes
- ISO 639-3: ksy
- Glottolog: khar1283

Kharia Thar is an Indic language spoken by the Hill Kharia culture of India.
