= Rose Kerketta =

Indian writer and activist (1940–2025)

- Born: 5 December 1940; Kaisara, Bolba, Ranchi District, Bihar Province, British India
- Died: 17 April 2025 (aged 84)
- Education: Simdega College, Ranchi University
- Occupations: Writer, poet, thinker and tribal rights activist
- Notable work: Kharia lok kathaon ka sahitik aur Sanskritik adhayayan; Premchandao Ludkoe(Kharia translation of Premchand's Story); Sinkoe Sulolo(Collections of Kharia story)
- Spouse: Sureshchandra Tete
- Children: Bandana Tete, Sonel Prabhajan Tete
- Parent(s): Martha Kerketta(mother), Pyara Kerketta(father)
- Awards: Rani Durgabati Samman; Ayodhya Prasad Khatri Samman; Pravawati Samman

Rose Kerketta (5 December 1940 – 17 April 2025) was an Indian writer, poet, thinker and tribal rights activist. She was born in Kaisara, Ranchi District, Bihar which is now Simdega District, Jharkhand to a Kharia family. She wrote several books about tribal language and culture. Kerketta died on 17 April 2025, at the age of 84.
