= Uttamlal Trivedi =

Gujarati writer from India (1872-1923)

- Born: 16 December 1872; Ahmedabad, British India
- Died: 9 December 1923 (aged 50)
- Education: B.A., LL.B.
- Alma mater: Gujarat College
- Occupations: writer and translator
- Writing career
- Language: Gujarati

Uttamlal Keshavlal Trivedi (pronounced [uttəmlal keʃəvlal trivedi]) (16 December 1872 – 9 December 1923) was a Gujarati writer and translator from India.

== Biography ==
Uttamlal Trivedi was born on 16 December 1872 at Ahmedabad in British India. After passing matriculation examination in 1887, he attended the Gujarat College from where he received a B.A. in 1891. After passing LL.B. examination, he started his legal practice at Rajkot. In 1904, he moved to Bombay to work as a lawyer. Sometime later he moved to business field with some other people of his caste and suffered financial loss.

He died on 9 December 1923.

== Works ==
In Bombay, Trivedi was associated with several social and literary institutions such as Kelavni Parishad, Sahitya Parishad and Nagar Mandal. He served as a secretary of Forbes Gujarati Sabha for sometime. He wrote articles on contemporary political issues and letters to the press regarding social, political and literary issues. He was in close association with several writers including Govardhanram Tripathi, Anandshankar Dhruv, Narsinhrao Divetia and Keshav Harshad Dhruv.

His articles were mainly published in Gujarati journals Vasant and Samalochak. He worked as an editor of the latter for sometime. He published articles in periodicals including Parsi ane Prajamitra, Sanj Vartaman, Hindustan and Indian Review. He served as an editor of Daily Mail for sometime in 1919.

Trivedi's criticism of Govardhanram's epic-novel Saraswatichandra is considered to be a remarkable work. He wrote a series of articles entitled Saraswatichandra ane Aapno Grihasansar (Saraswatichandra and the Web of Our Family-life), in which he analysed and evaluated Saraswatichandra from the points of view of plot-construction and characterisation. Trivedi also wrote on the public life of Narmad, and on literary life of Manilal Dwivedi. The other articles Trivedi has written include: G. M. Tripathi: A Hindu Idealist, A Historical Survey of National Indian Politics and Constitutional Theory of Hindu Law.

He translated Gita Rahasya by Lokmanya Tilak into Gujarati. His other translations include British Hindustan No Arthik Itihas (1990) and Akbar (1923).

A collection of Trivedi's writings was compiled and edited by Ramprasad Bakshi and Ramanlal Joshi under the title Uttamlal Trivedi Ni Gadyariddhi, published by Gujarati Sahitya Parishad in 1971.

== See also ==
- List of Gujarati-language writers
