= Govardhanram: Chintak ne Sarjak =

1962 Book by Vishnuprasad Trivedi

- Cover page
- Author: Vishnuprasad Trivedi
- Original title: ગોવર્ધનરામ: ચિંતક ને સર્જક
- Language: Gujarati
- Subject: Govardhanram Tripathi
- Genre: Critical study
- Publisher: N. M Tripathi Pvt. Ltd., Bombay
- Publication date: 1962
- Publication place: India
- OCLC: 24511423

Govardhanram: Chintak ne Sarjak (English: Govardhanram: The Thinker and Creative Artist), which was written by Indian writer Vishnuprasad Trivedi, is a 1962 Gujarati critical text about Gujarati writer Govardhanram Tripathi. It is considered an important work on Govardhanram.

== Publication history ==
Vishnuprasad Trivedi delivered a series of five lectures at Gujarat University from 16 August to 20 August 1960 at the inaugural session of the Govardhanram Madhavram Tripathi Lecture Series, which was sponsored by N. M. Tripathi Pvt. Ltd., a Bombay-based publisher. The lectures were published as a book titled Govardhanram: Chintak ne Sarjak by N. M. Tripathi Pvt. Ltd. in 1962.

== Contents ==
The first lecture introduces Govardhanram's philosophy of life. The next chapter presents a study of Saksharjivan (Life of Scholar), a work by Govardhanram that reflects his concept of scholarly and literary life. The third lecture evaluates Govardhanram's poetry and the fourth lecture evaluates Govardhanram's best-known work, a novel titled Saraswatichandra. While discussing the novel, Trivedi discusses the techniques and prose style adapted by Govardhanram.

Trivedi tries to argue Govardhanram is greater as a "Sarjak" – a creative artist – than as a "Chintak", a reflective thinker.

== Reception ==
Critic Mansukhlal Jhaveri cited these lectures as "an important contribution' to literature on Govardhanram. Reviewer R. M. Patel wrote; "perhaps it is the best study and evaluation of Govardhanram done so far".
