= Atmanimajjan =

1895 collection of poems by Manilal Dwivedi

- Cover page of 3rd edition (1959), edited by Dhirubhai Thaker
- Author: Manilal Dwivedi
- Original title: આત્મનિમજ્જન
- Language: Gujarati
- Genre: Ghazal, song, bhajan, metrical poems
- Publication date: 1895
- Publication place: British India
- OCLC: 46352716
- Dewey Decimal: 891.471

Atmanimajjan (pronounced [a.tmə.ni.mə.ɟɟən]) (transl. Drowning in the Self) is an 1895 collection of poems in Gujarati by Indian writer Manilal Dwivedi. The poems in the collection are heavily influenced by Advaita (non-dual) philosophy, which was at the core of Manilal's philosophical thinking. Uniquely in Gujarati poetry, for each poem Manilal wrote a long commentary, interpreting it in terms of Advaita philosophy.

The poems have been noted for their romantic mood, philosophical content, and variety of poetic forms. Manilal's best-known poem, the ghazal "Amar Asha" (Eternal hope), was reviewed by Mahatma Gandhi, who published it in his magazine, Indian Opinion, in South Africa.

== Publication history ==
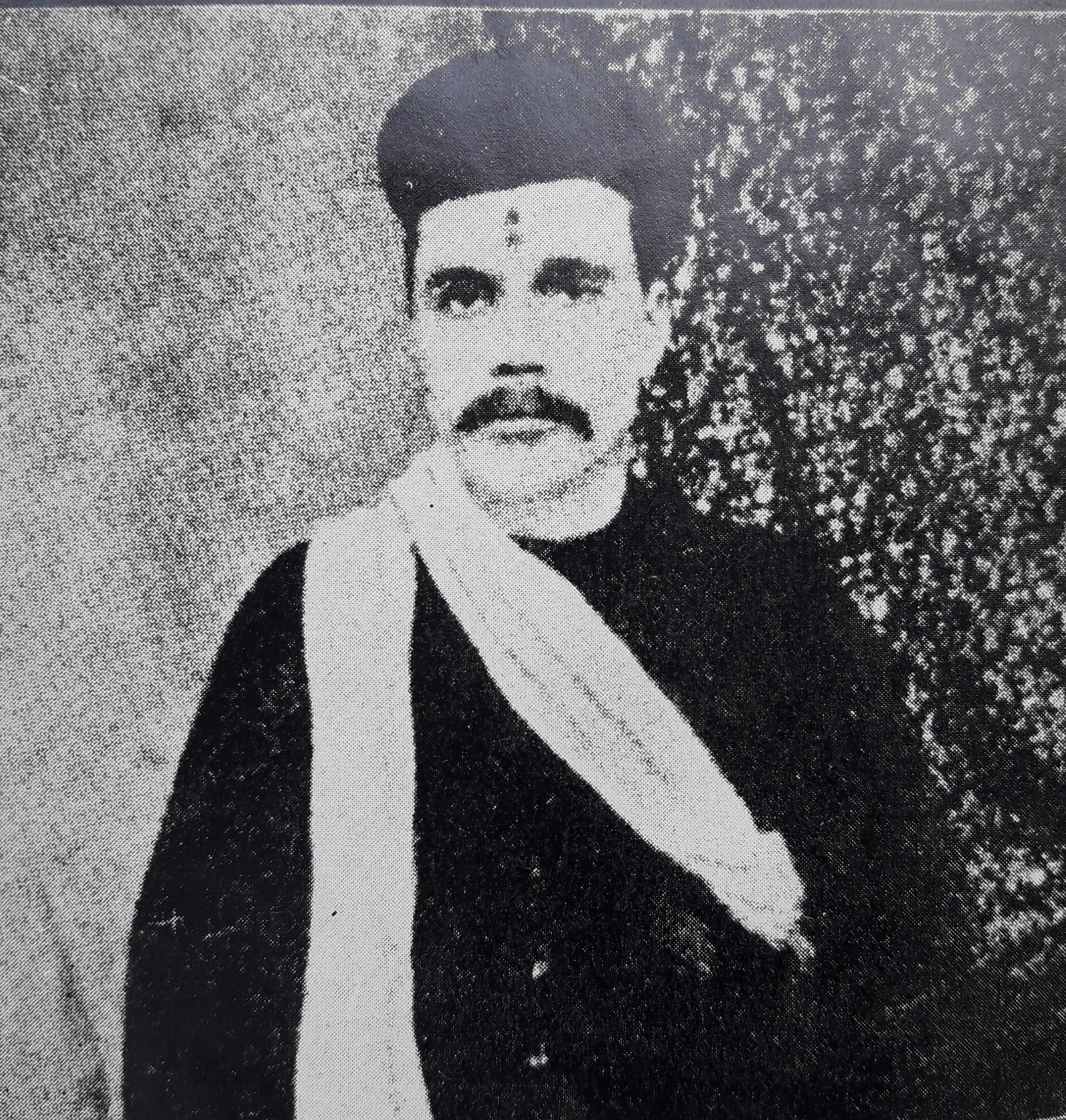
Manilal Dwivedi

In 1876, when Manilal passed his matriculation exam, he published a collection of 101 poems, Shikshashatak, written in a moralistic tone. It was dedicated to fellow poet Balashankar Kantharia (Klant). In 1887, Manilal published a collection of 11 poems under the title Premajivan (Life of Love), with a commentary written by himself. Seven years later, he published another set of 11 poems under the title Abhedormi (Ecstasy of Oneness). Manilal also published Atmanimajjan (Drowning in the Self), consisting of 40 poems composed prior to the end of June 1895. They included 22 poems from Premajivan and Abhedormi, 15 from Mishra-dhvani, two entitled "Javanika", and one entitled "Upahar" (Gift).

Manilal died in 1898. In 1914, his younger brother, Madhavlal Dwivedi, published the second edition of Atmanimajjan. It included an additional 5 poems composed between 1895 and 1898. In 1959, Gujarati writer Dhirubhai Thaker published the third edition of the book, which included another 10 previously unpublished poems taken from Manilal's handwritten diary.

== Contents ==
Poetry is the finest essence of our otherwise gross nature; it is the fire that purifies our thoughts and sublimates our feelings; it is the collyrium that enables us to blend the past and future with the present.

— Manilal Dwivedi; preface in Abhedormi (Ecstasy of Oneness)

Manilal's poetic ideal was influenced by his association with Gujarati writer and poet Narmad, and also by his own philosophical outlook and study of English poetry. In his journal Priyamvada (later Sudarshan), Manilal wrote that many of his poems came from his own intense personal experiences.

Over the twenty-two years during which he wrote poetry (1876–1898), Manilal tried various poetic forms. Atmanimajjan includes ghazals, songs, and bhajans, in addition to metrical poetic compositions.

A majority of Manilal's poems, thirty in number, are songs. Of these, according to Dhirubhai Thaker, "Gagane aaj premni zalak chhai re" (Glimpses of love cover the sky today), "Drig ras bhar more dil chhai rahi" (Lovely eyes pervade my heart), "Udi ja tu gafel gabhara" (Fly away, you gullible weakling!), "Sachi Balam priti na bane" (Oh my dear, true love is impossible), "Prit Vashkarni Vidya janjo" (Know it for certain, love is a hypnotic science), and "Ame Veragi Veragi janamna veragi" (We are ascetics, ascetics, ascetics since birth) are excellent expressions of Advaita philosophy.

== Commentary ==
Manilal was an exponent of Advaita philosophy, which he aimed to disseminate through his poetry. For this purpose, he appended a lengthy commentary to each poem, in which he attempted to interpret worldly experiences in terms of Advaita philosophy.

Manilal used the poetic form of the ghazal, for example, to convey physical love using the romantic terminology of Sufism. For Thaker, reading the ghazals alone, without the commentary, allows the reader "[to feel] in them the deep anguish, intensity and thrill of romantic love." Thaker describes the commentaries interpreting these ghazals in terms of Vedanta as far-fetched, and having the unintended consequence of compromising the ghazals' emotional and aesthetic appeal. In Thaker's words, "Manilal, the missionary of Advaita, overshadowed Manilal, the poet. Eventually the delicate structure of the poetry gets crushed under the weight of the philosophy of Vedanta."

== Reception and criticism ==
Thaker considers that Manilal's contribution to modern Gujarati poetry lies in the touch of philosophical seriousness he brings to it through Atmanimajjan. He cites the poem "Drig rasabhar" as an excellent example of poetry that transforms subjective feeling into universal experience.

Thaker notes that Manilal's appending a commentary to each of his poems is unique in the history of Gujarati poetry. Concerning this, he comments:

Had [Manilal] not attempted to restrict the scope of his poetry within the limits of his Kevalādvaita (Advaita) philosophy by appending a lengthy commentary but moved freely in that field as he did in prose, he would have occupied an important place in the history of modern Gujarati poetry. However, the few pieces he has left are appreciated by lovers of poetry on account of their romantic mood, philosophical content and variety of poetic forms.

In his poems "Upahar" (Gift) and "Janmadivas" (Birthday), to express his poetic thoughts and feelings Manilal experiments with prithvi, a meter from Sanskrit prosody. In Thakar's view, Manilal accomplishes this "flawlessly". Thakar notes that the same kind of experiment is found in Balwantray Thakore's poetry, saying that, although Thakore did not blindly imitate Manilal, in this regard Manilal is a predecessor of Thakore.

Gujarati critic Tribhuvandas Luhar (Sundaram), in his critical work Arvachin Kavita, cited the poems "Premajivan" and "Abhedormi" as the best lyrics in Gujarati poetry.

Atmanimajjan contains 12 ghazals, among which the critics Chimanlal Trivedi, Vijayray Vaidya, and Thaker identify "Kismat" (Destiny), "Anandormi", "Jame Ishq" (Cup of love), "Aha! Hu Ekalo" (Oh, me alone), and "Amar Asha" (Eternal hope) as Manilal's finest. The ghazal "Amar Asha" became popular in the Gujarati language. Mahatma Gandhi wrote a review of it while he was in South Africa, and published it in his own magazine, Indian Opinion. The critic Mansukhlal Jhaveri calls "Amar Asha" "a gem of Gujarati poetry".
