= Apno Dharma =

1916 collection of articles by Anandshankar Dhruv

Apno Dharma (Gujarati pronunciation: [apəɳo dʰərmə]) is 1916 Gujarati collection of articles on religion and philosophy written by Indian writer Anandshankar Dhruv.

== Publication history ==
The book was first published in 1916. The second edition appeared in 1920, and the third edition in 1942, which was edited by Ramnarayan V. Pathak. Apno Dharma was later republished in 1998 by Gujarat Sahitya Akademi under the title Dharmavichar (Vol. 1).

== Contents ==
The book contains Dhruv's articles which he contributed to the magazines Sudarshan and Vasant.

In the books, Dhruv has explained logically the theory of Advaita Vedanta (nondualism), a branch of Indian philosophy. He has presented his view rationally and tried to remove some of the misunderstandings about the Indian mythological episodes by giving new interpretation.

== Reception ==
Due to its lucid presentation and sound logic, Apano Dharma is considered a classic work in Gujarati literature.
