= Vasant (magazine) =

Gujarati language magazine founded by Anandshankar Dhruv (1902–1939)

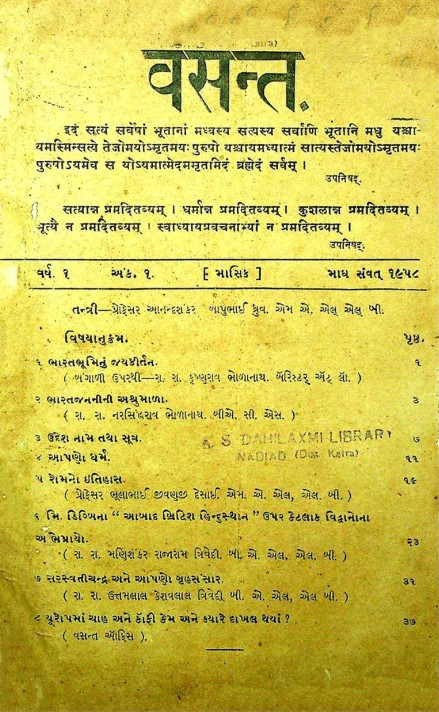
- Cover page of first issue
- Editor(s): Anandshankar Dhruv; Ramanbhai Neelkanth (1912–1924)
- Categories: literature, religion, philosophy, ethics, politics, education, economics, sociology, science
- Frequency: Monthly
- Founder: Anandshankar Dhruv
- Founded: 1902
- First issue: 1902; 124 years ago
- Final issue: 1939
- Country: British India
- Language: Gujarati

Vasant (pronounced [vəsən̪t̪]) was a Gujarati-language magazine founded and edited by Anandshankar Dhruv, which ran from 1902 to 1939. The magazine played a key role in the development of Gujarati prose writing, and is considered to hold a significant place in the tradition of Gujarati literary magazines.

== History ==
Anandshankar Dhruv was a close-friend and disciple of Gujarati writer and philosopher Manilal Dwivedi, and published articles in Manilal's magazine Sudarshan. Following Manilal's death in 1898, Dhruv assumed the editorship of Sudarshan for about four years. In 1902, realizing that he was unable to develop Manilal's line of thinking and mission further, and feeling himself unfit to follow Sudarshan's sectarian approach, Dhruv gave up the editorship of the magazine to start his own monthly, Vasant.

Dhruv stated the aim of Vasant in its first issue:

If we look back into the history of last fifty years, we will notice that the way we think and the way we behave/live have undergone a change. Some old problems are resolved, and some are being discussed from a different viewpoint. Some new problems have come into existence and a few more are likely to. In this situation, Gujarat needs a monthly journal which can reflect the time we live in and can also help in the progress of our life. We will satisfy if this monthly can fulfill this need. This is, in fact, the goal of this new journal.

— Anandshankar Dhruv, 1902 (Note: English translation. Original statement in Gujarati: "આપણો છેલ્લાં પચાસ વર્ષોનો ઈતિહાસ અવલોકીશું તો જણાશે કે એ દરમિયાન આપણા આચારવિચાર અને કર્તવ્યભાવનાના સ્વરૂપમાં અનેક ફેરફારો થઈ ગયા છે. કેટલાક જૂના પ્રશ્નો આજે પતી ગયા છે અને કેટલાક નવીન પદ્ધતિએ ચર્ચાવા લાગ્યા છે. કેટલાક નવા ઉત્પન્ન થયા છે અને કેટલાક થવાની શરૂઆતમાં છે. આવી સ્થિતિમાં, સમયનું યોગ્ય પ્રતિબિંબ ઝીલે અને તેના જીવનવિકાસમાં કાંઈક પણ સહાયરૂપ થાય એવા એક માસિકની ગુજરાતને બહુ જરૂર છે. અને એ જરૂર થોડીઘણી પણ કંઈક સંતોષકારક રીતે પૂરી પાડી શકાય તો ઠીક, એ આ નવીન ઉપક્રમનો એક ઉદ્દેશ છે.")

Ramanbhai Neelkanth edited the magazine from 1912 to 1924, with Dhruv resuming editorship again from 1925. Irregular publication led to Vasant becoming a quarterly in 1936. It was disestablished in 1939.

== Contents ==
Vasant covered a wide range of topics, including: religion, philosophy, poetry, ethics, politics, education, economics, sociology, science, research, and various aspects of literature and life. From its first issue, the magazine published a series of articles written by Uttamlal Trivedi under the title "Saraswatichandra ane Aapno Grihasansar" (Saraswatichandra and the Web of Our Family-life), based on Govardhanram Tripathi's novel Saraswatichandra. After the death of Govardhanram Tripathi in January 1907, in March 1907 Dhruv published a special volume of Vasant dedicated to Tripathi.

The magazine's regular contributors included: Manishankar Bhatt (Kant), Nhanalal, Narayan Hemchandra, Ramanbhai Neelkanth, Vishnuprasad Trivedi, Krishnalal Jhaveri, Balwantray Thakore, and Narsinhrao Divetia.

== Reception ==
Vasant is considered to hold a significant place in the tradition of Gujarati literary magazines, and played a key role in the development of Gujarati prose writing.

== See also ==
- List of Gujarati-language magazines
