= Vishnuprasad Trivedi =

Indian Gujarati-language literary critic (1899-1991)

- Born: Vishnuprasad Ranchhodlal Trivedi; 4 July 1899; Umreth, Bombay Presidency
- Died: 10 November 1991 (aged 92)
- Education: Master of Arts
- Alma mater: Gujarat College
- Occupations: writer, literary critic
- Writing career
- Pen name: Prerit
- Language: Gujarati
- Notable works: Upayana (1961); Govardhanram: Chintak ne Sarjak (1962)
- Notable awards: Ranjitram Suvarna Chandrak (1944); Narmad Suvarna Chandrak (1945); Sahitya Akademi Award (1962); Sahitya Gaurav Puraskar (1983)

Academic work
- Doctoral students: Jayant Pathak

Signature
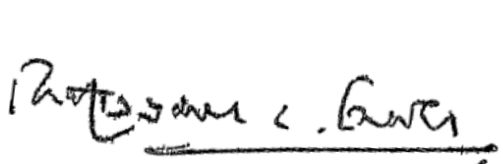

Vishnuprasad Ranchhodlal Trivedi (4 July 1899 – 10 November 1991) was a Gujarati literary critic from India.

== Early life ==
Trivedi was born in Umreth, Bombay Presidency on July 4, 1899. After his education at institutions including Borsad, Thasra, Kapadvanj and Nadiad, he matriculated in 1916 from the Government High School of Nadiad and was admitted to Gujarat College, Ahmedabad. At Gujarat College, he studied under Anandshankar Dhruv. He completed his Bachelor of Arts in 1920, with Sanskrit and other English subjects. He completed his Master of Arts in 1923 focusing on Sanskrit and Gujarati subjects. In 1921, he joined the MTB Arts College in Surat.

South Gujarat University awarded him Doctorate in Literature in 1971.

== Works ==
Trivedi was inspired by western literature and critics such as Coleridge and Matthew Arnold and Gujarati writers including Govardhanram Tripathi and Anandshankar Dhruv. He used to write under his pen-name Prerit. Linguistics, poetics and philosophy were his prime interests.

He published his first critical article on Saraswatichandra, a novel by Govardhanram, in 1924. Vivechana, his first collection of criticism, was published in 1939, followed by 1939 na Gujarati Vangmayni Sameeksha (1939), Parishilan (1949), Akhegita (1957), Upayan (1961), Sahitya Sansparsha (1979) and Drumaparna (1982). He lectured on Govardhanram Tripathi at Gujarat University in 1960 which are collected as Govardhanram: Chintak ne Sarjak (1962), in which he discussed and evaluated the style of Govardhanram Tripathi and his view about the philosophy of life in the context of his works Sarasvatichandra and Snehamudra. Drumaparna (1982) and Aascharyavat (1987) are collections of his essays.

His Arvachin Chintanatmak Gadya (Modern Reflective Prose) is a collection of five lectures delivered by him at the Bombay University, in the Thakkar Vassonji Madhavji Lecture Series, in 1946. The volume contains a discussion of the romantic tendencies in modem Gujarati literature. These lectures assess the essentials of reflective thought in Gujarati prose written during the years 1844 and 1905 A.D. In these lectures, he has summarized and discussed the thoughts of all the major Gujarati thinkers from Durgaram Mehta to Anandshankar Dhruv.

== Award ==
He received Sahitya Akademi Award in 1962 for his work Upayana (1961) and Narmad Suvarna Chandrak in 1945 for his work Parishilan (1949). He also received Ranjitram Suvarna Chandrak in 1944 and Sahitya Gaurav Puraskar in 1983. In 1974, Sahitya Akademi awarded him a fellowship.
