= Saraswatichandra (film) =

- Directed by: Govind Saraiya
- Written by: Vrajendra Gaur; Ali Riza (dialogues)
- Based on: Saraswatichandra by Govardhanram Madhavram Tripathi
- Produced by: Vivek
- Starring: Nutan; Manish
- Cinematography: Nariman A. Irani
- Edited by: G.G. Mayekar
- Music by: Kalyanji-Anandji
- Production company: Sarvodhya Pictures
- Release date: 1968
- Country: India
- Language: Hindi

Saraswatichandra is a black-and-white Hindi film released in 1968. It starred Nutan and Manish among others and was directed by Govind Saraiya.

The film was based on Saraswatichandra, a Gujarati novel, by Govardhanram Madhavram Tripathi, set in 19th-century feudalism in India. It also won the National Film Awards in the Best Cinematography and Best Music Director categories.

== Story ==
Saraswatichandra tells the story of a young aristocrat, Saraswatichandra, whose marriage has been fixed with Kumud (Nutan), an educated girl from a rich family. Saraswati decides to cancel the engagement and writes to Kumud to inform her. However, she replies and the two continue exchanging letters. Saraswati decides to defy customs, and pays a visit to his fiancée. A short-lived romance ensues. Saraswati returns home after promising Kumud and her family that he will return for her. However, a family feud takes place and Saraswati writes to Kumud that he will not be able to marry her. This triggers a series of misunderstandings, ending up in Kumud's marriage to a rich but illiterate suitor named Pramad (Ramesh Deo). As soon as she joins her husband at his palace, he quickly disdains her for nautch girls, and hardly hides his double life, asking her not to comment on his "weakness".

Meanwhile, Saraswati, having forsaken his home, has been roaming the country, and reaches Pramad's mansion. His presence is made known to Kumud's father-in-law, who despises his son's cheap life, and adopts the well-educated Saraswati as his secretary. The two former lovers meet, but Kumud is adamant about performing the duties of a faithful wife. Saraswati witnesses her anguished life and tries to reach out to her, but she objects. Nevertheless, things change, because Pramad’s behaviour grows more openly flirtatious. Kumud requests Saraswatichandra to stay away from her personal life and asks him to leave her in-laws' house. Determined to do whatever it takes to make her life easier, Saraswati decides to leave Kumud's life. On his way he is caught by dacoits and left for dead in the sun. A group of holy men spot him and take him away to their hermitage where he starts leading the life of a recluse.

Things darken for Kumud. She's chased away from Pramad’s mansion after he discovers one of Saraswati's letters. This gives Pramad the pretext he's been looking for: she must go back to her mother's house. Kumud's dignified attitude has earned her the friendship of women in her in-laws’ household, and they reveal to Pramad’s parents that he has chased his wife out of lust and selfishness. Pramad is thrown out of his house and he vows never to return. After leaving her in-laws' house, a disheartened Kumud tries to drown in the river but is retrieved by some holy women on the banks. They take her to the same temple where Saraswati is trying to atone for his sins.

The two lovers come face to face for one more time. Kumud submits to her fate and accepts the senior sister’s advice that she must do something for Saraswati. The latter, on the other hand, has a mission to fulfill: told by the guru that Pramad is dead, he will have to break the news to Kumud. A (very static) meeting is organised: after having realised that their fate has again brought them together, they admit that they are made for each other, and love blossoms between them. But Kumud doesn’t know she’s a widow, and still hangs on to the hope that she might change her husband.

When Saraswati reluctantly tells her, he faces a new Kumud, who must now embrace the widow’s status. The film ends with Saraswati accepting Kumud's request to marry her younger sister, Kusum.

== Cast ==
- Nutan as Kumud Sundari
- Manish as Saraswati Chandra / Navin Chander
- Vijaya Choudhury as Kusum
- Ramesh Deo as Pramad
- Sulochana Latkar as Kumud's mother
- B. M. Vyas as Kumud's grandfather
- Seema Deo as Alak
- Jeevan Kala
- S.B. Nayampalli as Pramad's father
- Sulochana Chatterjee as Pramad's mother
- Babu Raje
- Dulari as Saraswati Chandra's step-mother
- Shivraj as Saraswati Chandra's father
- Surendra
- Praveen Paul as Kumud's aunt

== Soundtrack ==
All the songs were composed by Kalyanji Anandji and lyrics were penned by Indeevar.

S.No	Title	Singer(s)	Duration	Raga
1	"Chandan Sa Badan"	Mukesh	03:57	Yaman (raga)
2	"Chandan Sa Badan"	Lata Mangeshkar	03:24	Yaman (raga)
3	"Chhod De Saari Duniya"	Lata Mangeshkar	04:28	Charukesi
4	"Hamne Apna Sab Kuch Khoya"	Mukesh	04:45	Bageshri
5	"Main To Bhool Chali Babul Ka Des"	Lata Mangeshkar	04:15	
6	"Phool Tumhe Bheja Hai Khat Mein"	Lata Mangeshkar, Mukesh	04:25	
7	"Sau Saal Pahle Ki Baat"	Mahendra Kapoor	03:37	
8	"Wada Humse Kiya Dil Kisi Ko Diya"	Mubarak Begum	04:14	

== Awards and recognition ==
- 1969, National Film Awards
  - Best Cinematography, Nariman Irani
  - Best Music Director, Kalyanji-Anandji
- 1969, Filmfare Best Dialogue Award, S. Ali Raza

== Remake ==
The 1968 Hindi film was followed by 1972 Gujarati sequel film Gunsundari No Ghar Sansar, also directed by Govind Saraiya, which won the National Film Award for Best Feature Film in Gujarati at the 20th National Film Awards. The film was considered important for its artistry and aesthetic.

== See also ==
- National Film Awards
- Filmfare Awards
- Filmfare Best Dialogue Award
- Saraswatichandra (disambiguation)
