= Amar Asha =

1898 Gujarati poem by Manilal Dwivedi

- by Manilal Dwivedi
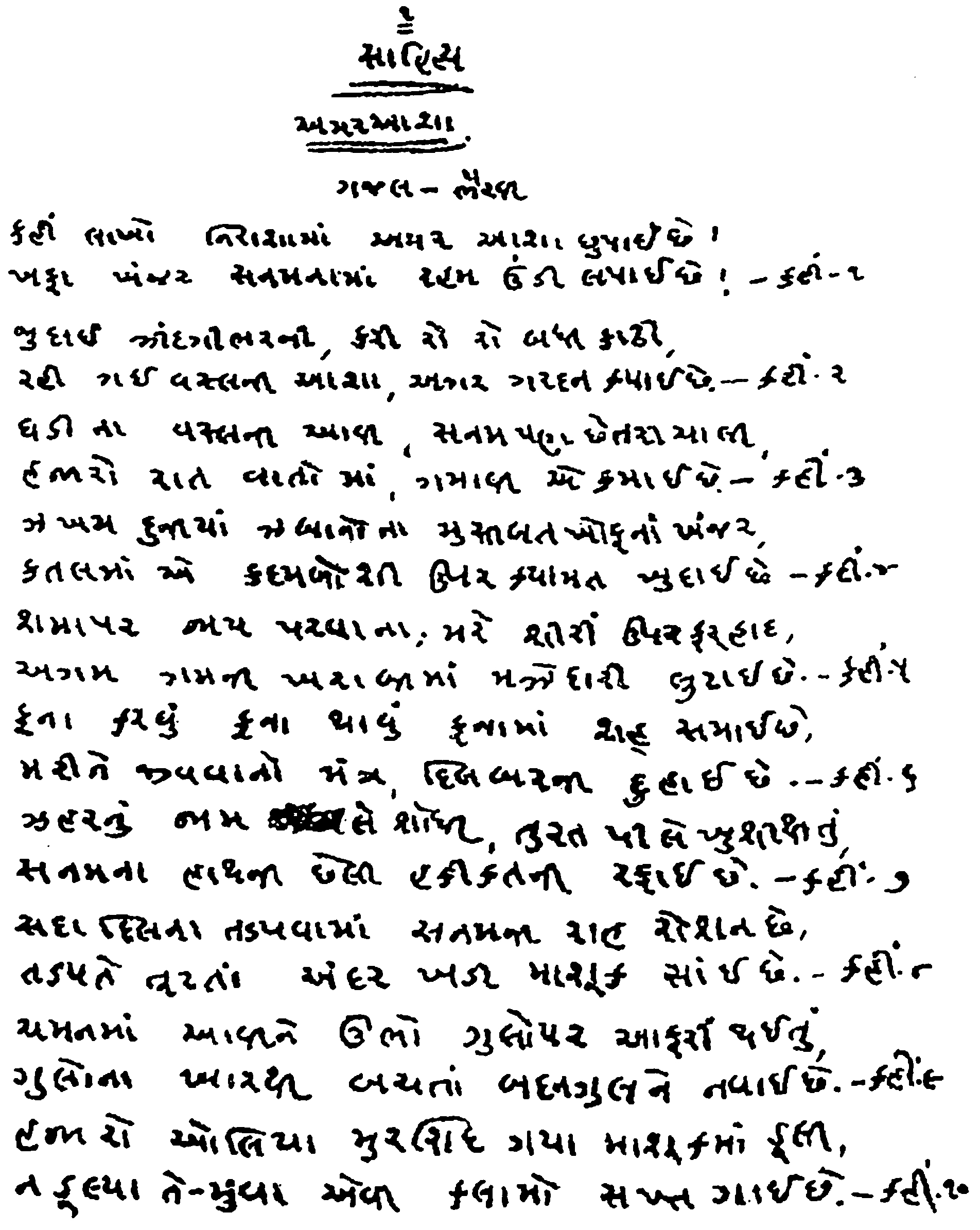
- Amar Aasha in Manilal's handwriting
- Original title: અમર આશા
- Translator: Natwarlal Pandya 'Ushnas'
- Written: 1898
- First published in: Sudarshan
- Country: British Raj
- Language: Gujarati
- Subject(s): Love, spirituality
- Form: Ghazal
- Meter: Hazaj
- Rhyme scheme: AA, BA, CA, DA
- Publication date: 1 October 1898
- Lines: 20
- અમર આશા at Gujarati Wikisource

Amar Asha (pronounced [ə.mər a.ʃa]) (transl. Immortal Hope) is a Gujarati poem by Manilal Dwivedi. It was his last poetic work – published posthumously in the 1898 issue of his own magazine, Sudarshan. Described as Manilal's most important work and cited as one of the most popular poems in Gujarati literature, Amar Asha has been studied and interpreted by several writers since its publication.

== Publication history ==
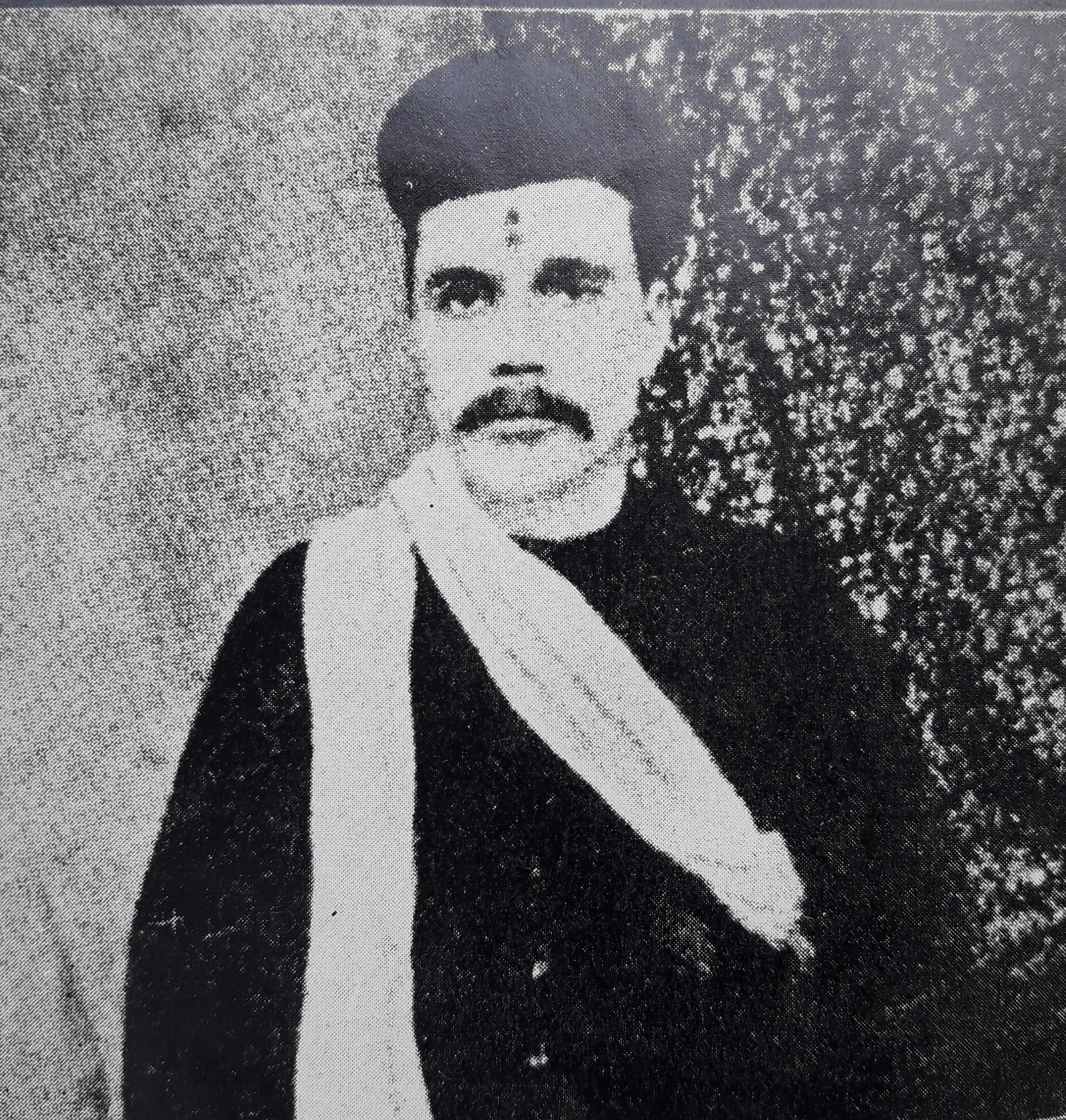
Manilal Dwivedi

Amar Asha was first published in Sudarshan (vol. 14, issue 1) on the day Manilal died, 1 October 1898, with some typographical errors. It was reproduced and included in many anthologies of poems, such as the second edition of Atmanimajjan, a collection of poems by Manilal, which was published in 1914 by his younger brother, Madhavlal Dwivedi, and an Himmatlal Anajaria's anthology, Kavyamadhurya (1920), with some corrections suggested by Amrit Keshav Nayak. It was also published in the 3rd edition of Atmanimajjan (1959), edited by Dhirubhai Thaker, based on the original manuscript.

== Composition ==
Syllabic structure of a verse
Stress	u	–	–	–	u	–	–	–	u	–	–	–	u	–	–	–
Syllable	Ka	hīṁ	lā	khō	ni	rā	śā	māṁ	a	mar	ā	śā	chu	pā	ī	chē

Amar Asha consists of 10 couplets and has been composed in Persian beher (meter) Hazaj. The opening couplet has rhymes in both lines, while the subsequent couplets' second line rhymes with the first couplet; i.e., the rhyme scheme is AA BA CA etc.

Mahatma Gandhi has noted that the poem includes some Urdu words and Persian legends representing study of Persian works by Manilal.

== Lyrics ==
"Amar Asha"
Audio 1min 35s

Gujarati

કહીં લાખો નિરાશામાં અમર આશા છુપાઈ છે!
ખફા ખંજર સનમનામાં, રહમ ઉંડી લપાઈ છે! –કહીં·૧

જુદાઈ ઝીંદગીભરની, કરી રો રો બધી કાઢી,
રહી ગઈ વસ્લની આશા, અગર ગરદન કપાઈ છે. –કહીં·૨

ઘડી ના વસ્લની આવી, સનમ પણ છેતરી ચાલી,
હજારો રાત વાતોમાં, ગમાવી એ કમાઈ છે. –કહીં·૩

ઝખમ દુનીયાં ઝબાનોના મુસીબત ખોફનાં ખંજર,
કતલમાં એ કદમબોશી ઉપર કયામત ખુદાઈ છે. –કહીં·૪

શમા પર જાય પરવાના, મરે શીરીં ઉપર ફરહાદ,
અગમ ગમની ખરાબીમાં, મઝેદારી લુટાઈ છે. –કહીં·૫

ફના કરવું ફના થાવું, ફનામાં શહ્ સમાઈ છે,
મરીને જીવવાનો મંત્ર, દિલબરની દુહાઈ છે. –કહીં·૬

ઝહરનું જામ લે શોધી, તુરત પી લે ખુશીથી તું,
સનમના હાથની છેલી હકીકતની રફાઈ છે. –કહીં·૭

સદા દિલના તડપવામાં સનમની રાહ રોશન છે,
તડપતે તૂટતાં અંદર ખડી માશૂક સાંઈ છે. –કહીં·૮

ચમનમાં આવીને ઉભો ગુલો પર આફરીં થઈ તું,
ગુલોના ખારથી બચતાં બદનગુલને નવાઈ છે. –કહીં·૯

હજારો ઓલિયા મુરશિદ ગયા માશૂકમાં ડૂલી,
ન ડૂલ્યા તે મૂવા એવી કલામો સખ્ત ગાઈ છે. –કહીં·૧૦

English translation:

Amongst millions of despairs, there hides an eternal hope,
In the angry stab of the beloved, there lies a deep kindness. – 1

I spent life-long separation weeping,
The hope of union will not be lost even if I am beheaded. – 2

Alas, the moment of union never came, the beloved left me in the lurch,
The thousands of night which we spent talking, these are my gain. – 3

The wounds of the worldwise tongues, difficulties and stabs of fear, I have endured,
Even in death I have kissed the kicks, the God knows and will bear me out in heaven. – 4

As moth goes into flame, so died Farhad for Shirin,
There lies a joy in the badness of such unknown pain. – 5

To sacrifice and be sacrificed, there is a dignity in sacrifice,
To live in a death, is the motto proclaimed by the beloved. – 6

Look for a glass of poison, gulp it down happily,
It is the last sacrifice of the reality at the hands of beloved. – 7

The path of beloved is known for eternal yearning of the heart,
At the end of that yearning, you find the beloved within. – 8

Having come to the garden, you have pleased by the roses,
Avoiding the thrones of the roses, wonders the rosy. – 9

Thousands of mystics and preachers have drowned in the beloved,
Those who have not drowned are also dead, thus sings the scriptures. – 10

== Reception ==
Amar Asha is popular among Gujarati people.

Mahatma Gandhi liked the poem and reviewed it in his magazine Indian Opinion. He took it from Kavyamadhurya and included it in his collection of poems Nitina Kavya (Note: The issue of Indian Opinion in which it was published is not known. Nitina Kavya was published by International Printing Press, Phoenix, Natal in an unknown year. Nitina Kavya has 34 poems in 48 pages. The review is not credited but, based on writing style, it is certainly written by Gandhi.) along with the review. He praised it for the themes of finding god and love. He noted that it is written by a Hindu scholar in an Islamic style so Hindus and Muslims "both should be proud of it". He also noted that "the beloved" (Sanam) can be interpreted as a lover as well as the God or knowledge, similar to the interpretation of poems of Omar Khayyam.

In 1900, Manilal's disciple Gaurishankar Govindji Mehta had the poem reviewed by Vedanta monk Atmanand who had tried to interpret it in terms of Vedanta philosophy. Gajendrashankar Pandya has called the poem "immortal".

Gujarati critic Mansukhlal Jhaveri called it "a gem of Gujarati poetry".
