= Ramprasad Bakshi =

Gujarati writer, scholar, translator and editor (1894-1989)

- Born: 27 June 1894; Junagadh State
- Died: 22 March 1989 (aged 94); Mumbai, Maharashtra, India
- Occupations: Writer, scholar, translator and editor
- Writing career
- Language: Gujarati
- Notable work: Vangamaya Vimarsha (1963)
- Notable awards: Narmad Suvarna Chandrak (1960-1964)

Academic background
- Academic advisors: Anandshankar Dhruv; Narsinhrao Divetia

Academic work
- Doctoral students: Sitanshu Yashaschandra

Ramprasad Premshankar Bakshi (27 June 1894 – 22 March 1989) was a Gujarati writer, scholar, translator and editor from India. He was a student of Anandshankar Dhruv and Narsinhrao Divetia, and was appointed the president of Gujarati Sahitya Parishad during 1976–77.

== Life ==
Ramprasad Bakshi was born on 27 June 1894 in Junagadh. His family was native of Morbi. He completed his schooling from Rajkot, Wadhwan and matriculated in 1910. He graduated in 1914 from Gujarat College, Ahmedabad, with Sanskrit, and moved to Mumbai in 1915. He started his career as a teacher at Anandilal Poddar High School and retired from there from the post of its principal. He also served as the professor of Gujarati at Mithibai College, Mumbai for several years. He was the president of the 28th session (1976–1977) of the Gujarati Sahitya Parishad.

He died on 22 March 1989 at Mumbai.

== Works ==
Ramprasad Bakshi was a student of Anandshankar Dhruv and Narsinhrao Divetia. He studied profoundly both Sanskrit and English literature, and is regarded as the representative of the period known in the history of Gujarati literature as 'Panditayuga'.

His works Natyarasa (1959) and Karunarasa (1963) are based on Indian dramatic theories. In Natyarasa, he explained the process of Rasa nishpatti and other elements of Indian dramatics. Karunarasa deals with the Greek concept of tragedy and the idea of Karunarasa discussed by Indian theoreticians. His Vangamaya Vimarsha (1963) is a collection of articles of literary criticism, in which, he included articles about Sanskrit and Western poetics, analytical studies about literary terms and concepts and reviews of some literary works, movements and forms. His work Govardhanramnum Manorajya (1976) focus on the life, works and philosophy of Gujarati author Govardhanram Tripathi.

Being a student of Narsinhrao Divetia, he translated Narsinhrao's Wilson Philological Lectures entitled Gujarati Language and Literature (Vol. I and II) into Gujarati as Gujarati Bhasha ane Sahitya (Vol. I and II, 1936-1957). He also edited Narsinhrao's diary, known as Rojanishi, in collaboration with Dhansukhlal Mehta. His other significant works include Kathasarita (1977) based on Kathasaritsagara and Gujarati translation of Sukhamani (1935), a Sikh religious book.

== Awards ==
He received Narmad Suvarna Chandrak (1960-1964) for his work Vangamaya Vimarsha.

== See also ==
- List of Gujarati-language writers
