= Scrapbook =

Scrapbook may refer to:

- Scrapbooking, the process of making a scrapbook

== Software ==
- Scrapbook, an early (1970s) information storage and retrieval system developed at the National Physical Laboratory in the United Kingdom
- Scrapbook (Mac OS), a Mac OS application
- ScrapBook, a Firefox extension

== Film and TV ==
- Scrapbook (film), American horror film 2000
- Scrapbook, American comedy film with Eric Balfour 1999

== Music ==
- Scrapbook, album by Captain & Tennille 1999
- Scrapbook (album), an album by William Parker's Violin Trio 2003
- Scrapbook (Portastatic EP)
- Scrapbook (The Limousines EP)

== Other uses ==
- Scrap Book (diary), diary written by Indian writer Govardhanram Tripathi
- Scrapbook for 19.., an occasional programme on the BBC Home Service

== See also ==
- Book (disambiguation)
