= Saraswatichandra =

Saraswatichandra may refer to:

- Saraswatichandra (novel), a Gujarati novel by Govardhanram Madhavram Tripathi
- Saraswatichandra (film), a 1968 Hindi film based on the novel
- Saraswatichandra (TV series), a 2013 Hindi TV series based on the novel
