= Dahilakshmi Library =

Public library in Nadiad, India

A.S. Dahilakshmi Library
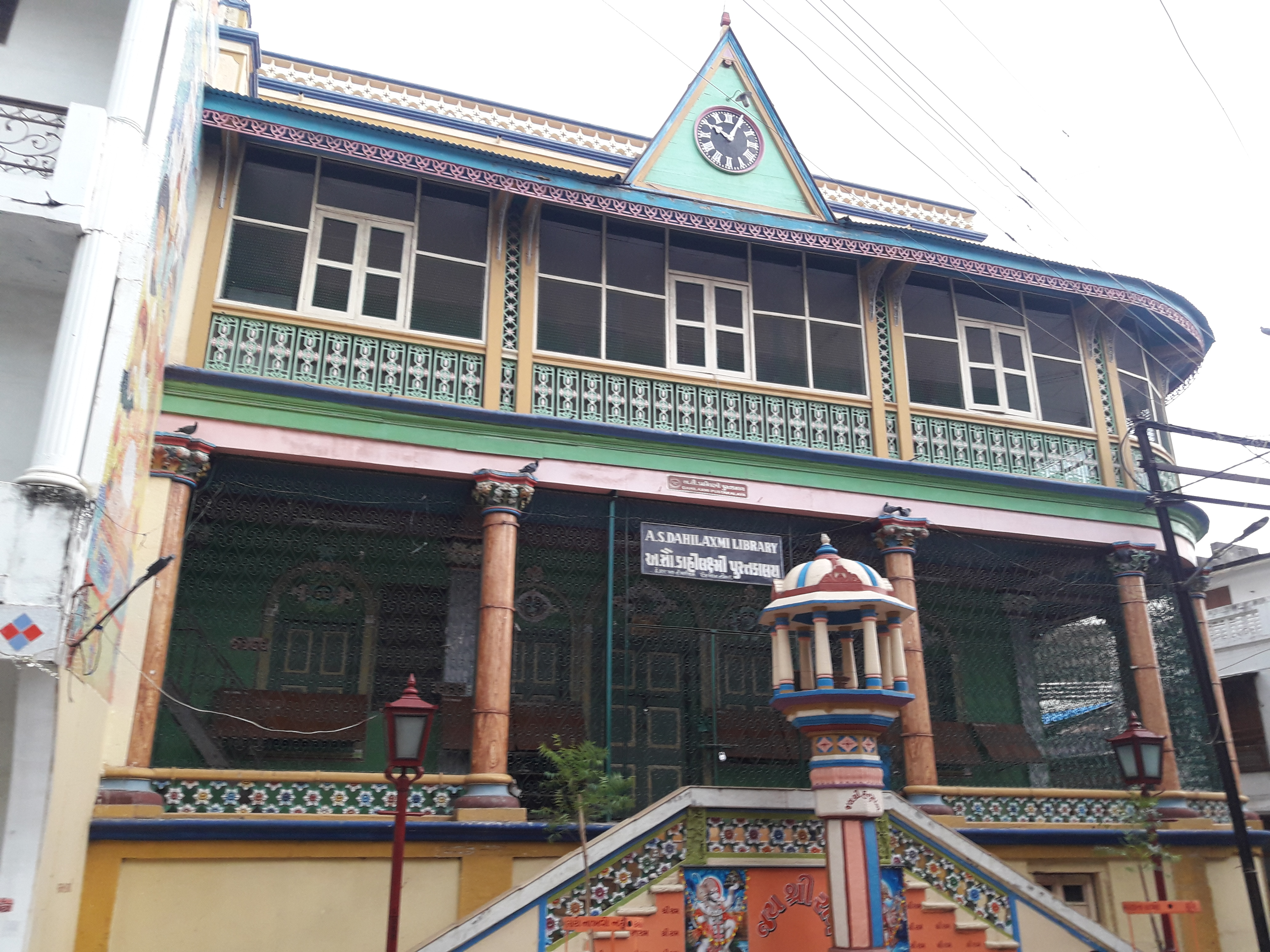
- Location: Samdi Chakla, Nadiad, Gujarat, India
- Type: Public library
- Established: 25 April 1898; 128 years ago
- Service area: Nadiad

Dahilakshmi Library or A.S. Dahilakshmi Library is a public library in Nadiad, Gujarat, India.

== History ==
Dahilakshmi Library was established on 25 April 1898 (Vaishakha Sud 4, Vikram Samvat 1954) by Gujarati writer Mansukhram Tripathi in memory of his wife, Dahilakshmi. The building was constructed at a cost of ₹30,000. The library's first president was Govardhanram Tripathi. As the library expanded, Mansukhram made arrangements for its maintenance through a trust deed. He provided promissory notes worth ₹25,000 for the library's expenses and another ₹10,000 for reprinting his books. During British rule, the library received recognition as a registered library. In 1948, under a Government of India scheme, it was recognised as a district library.

Located at Samdi Chakla area in the city, the library houses more than 53,000 books and manuscripts.
