= Scrap Book (diary) =

Diary written by Govardhanram Tripathi

- Volumes of Scrap Book edited by કાન્તિલાલ પંડ્યા (whose name is romanized as Kantilal Pandya), Sanmukhlal Pandya and Ramprasad Bakshi
- Author: Govardhanram Tripathi
- Language: English
- Publisher: N. M Tripathi Pvt. Ltd., Bombay
- Publication date: 1957–1959
- Publication place: India
- OCLC: 5413595

Scrap Book, formally published as Govardhanrám Madhavrám Tripáthi's Scrap Book, is a diary written by Indian writer Govardhanram Tripathi from 1885 to 1906. It is a repository of the author's wide-ranging thoughts, including on moral and spiritual conflicts. It provides many details about Govardhanram's life and family.

== Background ==
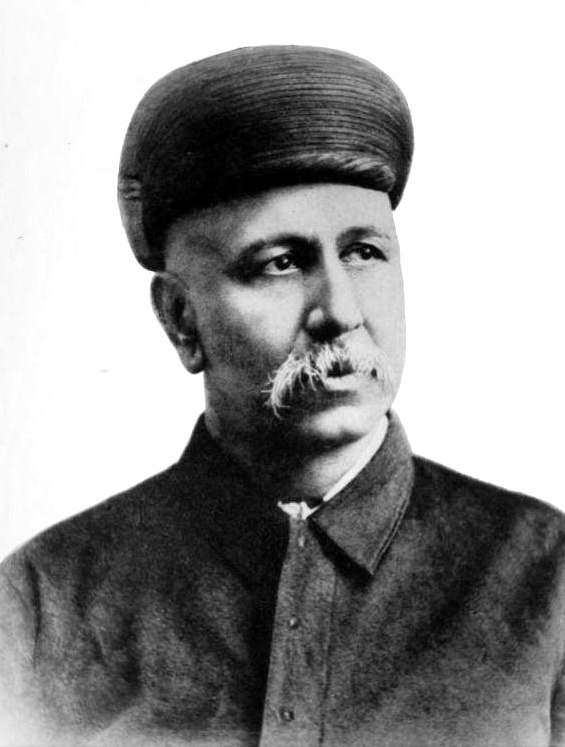
Govardhanram Tripathi

Govardhanram obtained his LLB degree in 1883 after repeated failures, and moved to Mumbai in 1884 to practice as a pleader at high court. In January 1885, when he was 30, he started writing Scrap Book. He noted in it important points and quotations from books that he read. He wrote in the diary till 3 November 1906, a few months before his death. It is believed that Govardhanram maintained a personal diary also, but this has not been found.

Originally spanning seven notebooks, it was edited by કાન્તિલાલ પંડ્યા (whose name is romanized as Kantilal Pandya), Sanmukhlal Pandya, and Ramprasad Bakshi and published in three volumes from 1957 to 1959. Bakshi published an abridged version in Gujarati titled Govardhanram Ni Manannondh.

== Contents ==
The subjects of the Scrap Book can be divided in three sections: (1) Govardhanram's speculations and comments on Hindu religio-philosophical texts and concepts; (2) his views on contemporary socio-political issues, issues, institutions and leaders; and (3) problems, resentments and pain in his personal life as the head of Hindu joint family.

The notes in the Scrap Book include Govardhanram's personal comments on a wide range of subjects including his personal problems, his nature, emotions, ideals, the problem of his retiring from the active life, Sannyas and Yoga, family life and its problems, perception on the soul, God, life after death, virtue, immorality, bliss, astrology, his own writings, and contemporary events.

== Reception ==
In Tridip Suhrud's assessment, Scrap Book was outstanding among Indian self-focused compositions that elaborate on the themes and the quest of the medieval Bhakti tradition, giving, perhaps for the first time, a vernacular version of the idea that the self is an experimental locus, where what is recorded, the outer and inner worlds, while fusing in the self can simultaneously be disentangled to create separate dimensions. The most exemplary modern expression of the paradox was, he added, Mahatma Gandhi's autobiography.

Scholars including Uttamlal Trivedi and Balwantray Thakore have extensively used these observations while writing on Govardhanram.
