= Shrimad Bhagavad Gita Rahasya =

1915 Marathi book by Bal Gangadhar Tilak

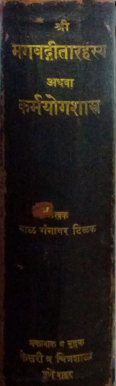
Shrimad Bhagvad Gita Rahasya

Shrimad Bhagvad Gita Rahasya, popularly also known as Gita Rahasya or Karmayog Shastra, is a 1915 Marathi language book authored by Indian social reformer and independence activist Bal Gangadhar Tilak while he was in prison at Mandalay, Burma. It is the analysis of Karma yoga which finds its source in the Bhagavad Gita, a sacred book for Hindus. According to him, the real message behind the Bhagavad Gita is Nishkam Karmayoga (selfless action), rather than Karma Sanyasa (renouncing of actions), which had become the popular message of Gita after Adi Shankara. He took the Mimamsa rule of interpretation as the basis of building up his thesis.

== History and overview ==
This book consists of two parts. The first part is the philosophical exposition and the second part consists of the Gita, its translation and the commentary.

The book was written by Tilak in pencil with his own handwriting while being imprisoned at the Mandalay jail from 1908 to 1914. The more-than-400 pages of script was written in less than four months and is hence in itself considered as "remarkable achievement". Although the writing was completed in the early years of his term, the book was only published in 1915, when he returned to Poona. He defended the ethical obligation to the active principle or action, as long the action was selfless and without personal interest or motive.

In a speech on his, Gita Rahasya Tilak said "Various commentators have put as many interpretations on the book, and surely the writer or composer could not have written or composed the book for so many interpretations being put on it. He must have but one meaning and one purpose running through the book, and that I have tried to find out". He finds the message of the subservience of all yogas to Karmayoga or the yoga of action rather than the yoga of sole knowledge (jnanayoga) or of devotion (bhaktiyoga).

== Books on it ==
Various authors have written books based on Tilak's Gita Rahasya and have also translated it into other languages.

- A Gist of Mr. Tilak's Gita-Rahasya Or Karma-Yoga-Shastra, Etc.
- Introduction to The Gita-rahasya: Or The Fundamentals of Life and Living

=== Translations ===
- Gita Rahasya in Bengali by Jyotirindranath Tagore
- Gita Rahasya in Gujarati by Uttamlal Trivedi
- Gita Rahasya in Kannada by Aluru Venkata Rao
