= Sitanshu Yashaschandra =

Gujarati poet and writer (born 1941)

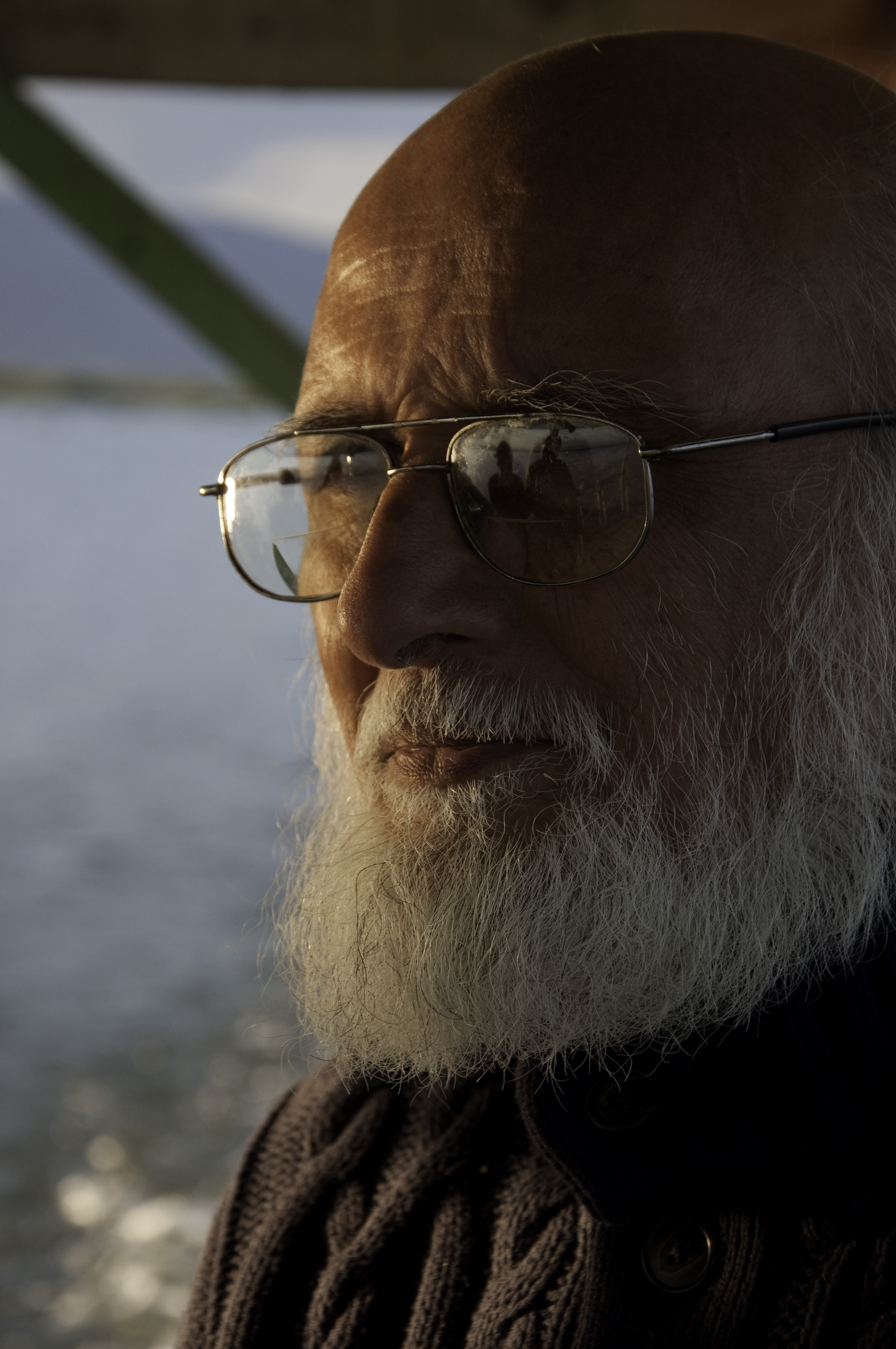
- at Loktak Lake, December 2016
- Born: Sitanshu Yashaschandra Mehta; 19 August 1941 (age 85); Bhuj (now in Kutch, Gujarat, India)
- Education: St. Xavier's College, Mumbai (B.A.); University of Bombay (M.A.; 1965); Indiana University Bloomington
- Occupations: poet, literary critic, playwright, editor
- Spouse: Anjaniben (m. 1966)
- Writing career
- Language: Gujarati
- Period: modern Gujarati literature
- Notable work: Jatayu (1986)
- Notable awards: Saraswati Samman (2017); Padma Shri (2006); Sahitya Akademi Award (1987); Ranjitram Suvarna Chandrak (1987)

Sitanshu Yashaschandra Mehta (born 19 August 1941), better known as Sitanshu Yashaschandra, is an Indian Gujarati-language poet, playwright, translator and academic from Gujarat, India.

He was the President of Gujarati Sahitya Parishad. He was awarded the Sahitya Akademi Award given by Sahitya Akademi, India's National Academy of Letters, in 1987 for his poetry collection Jatayu. Subsequently, he was awarded the Padma Shri, the fourth highest civilian award by Government of India, in 2006.

== Life ==
Sitanshu Yashaschandra was born on 19 August 1941 at Bhuj, Cutch State (now in Kutch, Gujarat, India). His family belonged to Petlad. His father was a Government Officer. He completed BA in Gujarati and Sanskrit from St. Xavier's College, Mumbai and later MA from University of Bombay in 1965. He taught Gujarati from 1965 to 1968. In 1970, he went to US under Fulbright Scholarship and studied MA in Aesthetics and Comparative Literature from Indiana University Bloomington. He later completed PhD in 1975. He went to France for a year under Ford West European Fellowship where he studied, translated in Gujarati and did comparative study of Eugène Ionesco's Macbett and Shakespeare's Macbeth. He also completed PhD in 1977 from University of Mumbai under Ramprasad Bakshi.

Yashaschandra married Anjaniben on 8 May 1966. His daughter, Vipasha, was born in 1971, while his son, Aranyak, in 1978.

=== Career ===
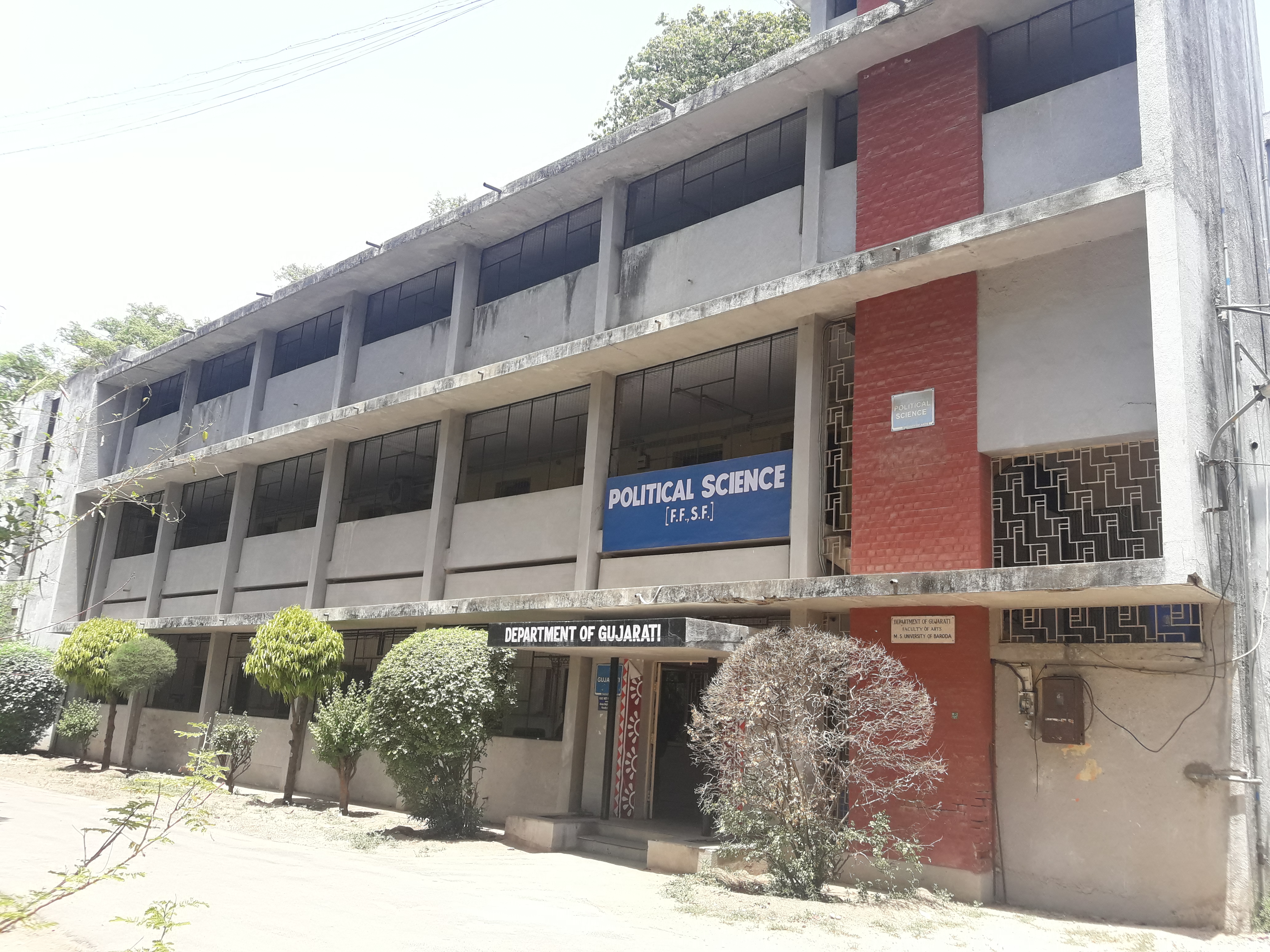
Building of Department of Gujarati, M. S. University

He has taught Gujarati at Mithibai College from 1972 to 1975 and later at Maharaja Sayajirao University of Baroda from 1983. Sitanshu served as Vice-Chancellor of Saurashtra University, Rajkot for three years. He served as a visiting professor at the Sorbonne University, Loyola Marymount University, and Jadavpur University. He was an emeritus professor and national lecturer at University Grant Commission. He was appointed the chief editor of the Encyclopedia of Indian Literature published by Sahitya Akademi, Delhi in 1977.

== Works ==
Yashaschandra wrote mainly in Gujarati but his works are translated into Hindi and other languages. He has translated some works of poetry, drama and criticism from English to Gujarati. Surrealism is considered as his signature style.

Odysseus nu Halesu (1974), Jatayu (1986) and Vakhar (2008) are his collections of poetry. Mohen-jo-dado is a collection of poems published in August 1970 in Sanskriti magazine and later released on audio cassette in 1978.

He has written and adapted several plays. He adapted Eugène Ionesco's The Lesson as Margdarshan in Gujarati. He also adapted Thomas Hardy's story, Day After The Fair as a play, Vaishakhi Koyal in Gujarati. He also adapted Peter Shaffer's Equus as Tokhar in Gujarati. It was produced by Pravin Joshi, Shafi Inamdar, and Mahendra Joshi. All three literary adaptations were successful commercially. His Aa Manas Madrasi Lage Chhe (This Man Looks Madrasi, 1978) was directed by Satyadev Dube. Kem Makanji, Kya Chalya? (Hello Makanji, Where Are You Going?, 1985) appeared as a radio play was directed by Nimesh Desai of Chorus. Grahan (Eclipse, 1989), directed by P. S. Chari, was inspired by Oedipus.

In 1999, his six plays, all performed on stage, were published, which included Chhabili Ramati Chhanumanu, Kem Makanji, Kya Chalya?, Lady Lalkunwar, Aa Manas Madrasi Lage Chhe, Tokhar and Khagras. Lady Lalkunvar (1999) is a Gujarati adaptation of Eduardo De Filippo's play, Filumena Marturano. Ashvatthama Aaje Pan Jive Chhe (ane Hanay Chhe) (2021) is a play based on Ashwatthama. Grahan is his unpublished work. Jagine Joyu To is his other work. He has edited Natya-Kesuda.

Simankan ane Simollanghan (1977), Ramaniyata no Vagvikalpa (1979) and Asyaha Sarga Vidhau (2002) are his works of criticism, theory of literature and literary historiography.

He had written a screenplay of 1993 Hindi film Maya Memsaab, which was based on Gustave Flaubert's Madame Bovary.

He edited the book Critical Discourse in Gujarati, an anthology of critical writings in Gujarati.

== Awards ==
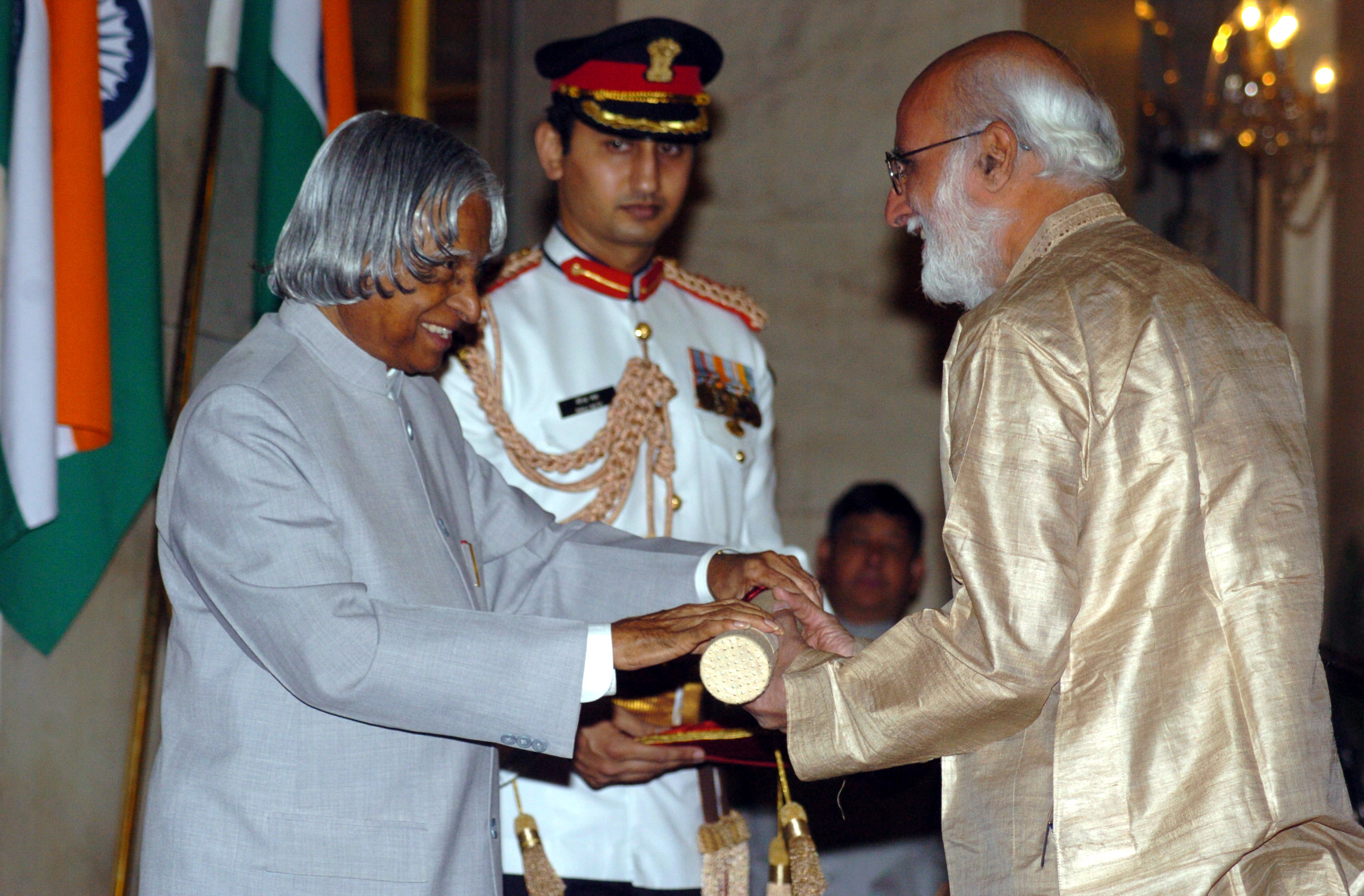
The President, Dr. A.P.J. Abdul Kalam presenting Padma Shri to Sitanshu Yashaschandra, at an Investiture Ceremony at Rashtrapati Bhavan in New Delhi on March 29, 2006

He received Sahitya Akademi Award for Gujarati writer in 1987 for his poetry collection Jatayu. He also received Ranjitram Suvarna Chandrak, the highest award in Gujarati literature, in 1987. He was awarded Padma Shri, the fourth highest civilian award in India, in 2006. He also received Rashtriya Kabir Samman (1998) by Government of Madhya Pradesh, Indian National Theatre – Gujarat Samachar award, Nanalal Award, Gujarat State Government Poetry award. He was selected for Adyakavi Narsinh Mehta Award in 2008 but he had declined. In 2013, he won Sahitya Gaurav Puraskar. He received Saraswati Samman (2017) for his poetry collection Vakhar. The award citation said: "...Vakhar is the pinnacle of his poetic journey where he crosses the boundaries of the real world and establishes high standards of Liberty in language and creativity by evolving a balance in the contradicting elements of human emotions and thoughts".

== See also ==
- List of Gujarati-language writers
