= Sudarshan (magazine) =

Gujarati magazine founded by Manilal Dwivedi (1890)

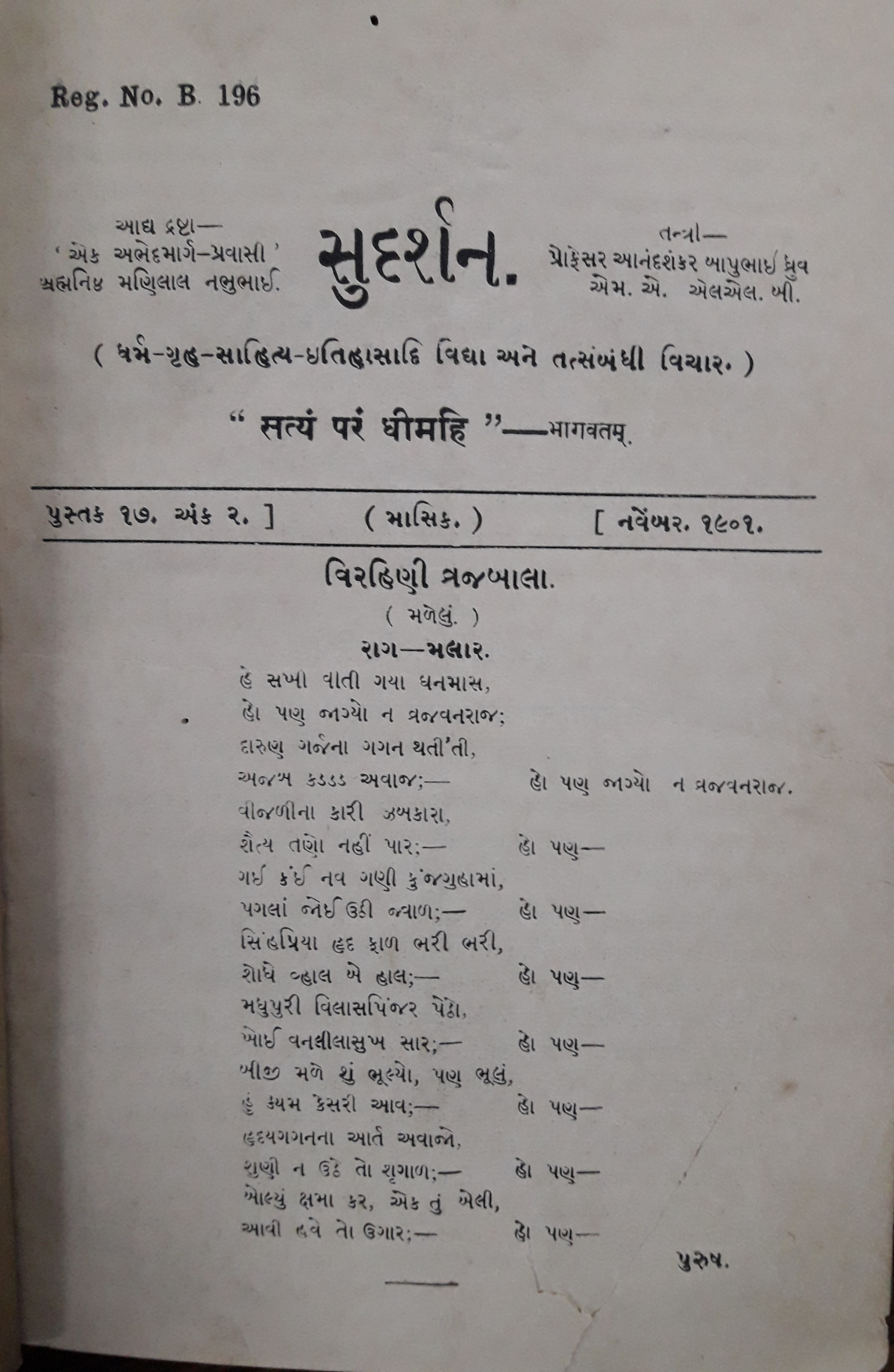
- Sudarshan title page; vol. 17, issue 2; November 1901
- Editor: Manilal Nabhubhai Dwivedi; Anandshankar Dhruv; Madhavlal Nabhubhai Dwivedi
- Frequency: Monthly
- Founder: Manilal Nabhubhai Dwivedi
- Founded: October 1890
- Country: British India
- Based in: Nadiad
- Language: Gujarati

Sudarshan (pronounced [su.dər.ʃən]) was a Gujarati magazine founded and edited by Indian writer Manilal Nabhubhai Dwivedi.

== History ==
While a professor at Samaldas College, Bhavnagar, the Indian writer Manilal Dwivedi started a monthly magazine, Priyamvada, in August 1885. Its aim was to educate women. He discontinued it in September 1890 after realizing that it would not flourish so long as it addressed only women readers, and converted it into the monthly magazine Sudarshan, expanding its scope to all of the topics he considered important, and aiming it at society at large. The motto of the magazine was Satyam Param Dhimahi (Sanskrit: सत्यं परं धीमहि), meaning 'may we meditate upon the Supreme Truth'.

After Manilal's death, his disciple and close friend Anandshankar Dhruv, at the insistence of Mansukhram Tripathi, took over the editorship of Sudarshan. He held this post for four years, and after Dhruv started his own magazine, Vasant, in 1902, the editorship was taken over by Manilal's elder brother Madhavlal Nabhubhai Dwivedi. Madhavlal edited it for about two years. There are no surviving copies of the magazine after January 1904, and it is unknown when it ceased to publish.

== Contents ==
As well as running regular features such as book-reviews, articles on social and political problems and some creative writing, Manilal published three important series of articles in Sudarshan: Abhyas (Practice; December 1894 – September 1898); Purva ane Pashchim (East and West); and Gujaratna Lekhako (Writers of Gujarat). These, according to the writer Dhirubhai Thaker, are the best products of Manilal's reflective and creative faculties. Manilal's last and the most famous poem, Amar Asha, was published in Sudarshan (vol. 14, issue 1), on 1 October 1898, the same day that Manilal died. Kalapi's first poem, Fakiri Hal, was first published in Sudarshan in November 1892 issue.

== Subscribers ==
At Manilal's death the number of subscribers was 371. They included Sir Chinubhai Madhavlal, Narsinhrao Divetia, Manibhai Jashbhai, Baa Saheb Bairajba, Lallubhai Shamaldas, Kalapi, Balwantray Thakore, Mansukhram Tripathi and Manishankar Bhatt 'Kant'.

== See also ==
- List of Gujarati-language magazines

== Sources ==
- Thaker, Dhirubhai (1983). Manilal Dwivedi. Makers of Indian Literature. New Delhi: Sahitya Akademi. OCLC 10532609.
