= Jatayu (book) =

1986 poetry collection by Sitanshu Yashaschandra

- cover page (1st ed.)
- Author: Sitanshu Yashaschandra
- Original title: જટાયુ
- Language: Gujarati
- Publisher: R. R. Sheth & Co., Mumbai
- Publication date: 1986
- Publication place: India
- Media type: Print
- Pages: 130 (1st ed.)
- Awards: Sahitya Akademi Award (1987)
- ISBN: 978-93-80051-19-2 (4th ed.)
- OCLC: 20357562
- Dewey Decimal: 891.471
- LC Class: MLCMA 2009/00327 (P) PK1859.S5638

Jatayu is a Gujarati poetry collection by Sitanshu Yashaschandra published in 1986. It is a collection of surrealistic poems based on Indian mythology, romantic temper, modern consciousness, and nature. It won the Sahitya Akademi Award in 1987.

== Contents ==
Jatayu includes 34 poems divided into eight mutually unconnected sections. Each section has a line or a stanza taken from a poem to serve as a caption. The critic Dhirubhai Thaker has classified these poems in five categories; surrealistic poems, poems based on Indian mythology, poems of romantic temper, nature poems, and poems reflecting modern consciousness.

Of the six surrealistic poems, "Pralay" (The flood) and "Moen-jo-dado: Ek Surreal Akasmaat" are considered the best by several critics. "Pralay" presents a feeling of death or destruction, with the help of situations described in several modes of narration. Sitanshu has used images like the cobra, the moon, pallbearers, pests, a pregnant maiden, flood, famine, fire, a woman and nothingness to arouse the feeling of death or destruction.

The title poem, "Jatayu", is an experiment in Akhyana, a poetic form of medieval Gujarati literature inspired by the character of Jatayu in the epic Ramayana. It presents a feeling of the distressful condition of modern man.

== Reception ==
Jatayu was well received by readers and critics. Dhirubhai Thaker acclaimed the poems for their technique of sound of words, symbols and surreal diction. He further added that in some poems like "Haa" and "Ghero", which however are fine pieces of imagery, the language loses its sharpness due to the long and unclear expressions.

The book was selected for the Sahitya Akademi Award in 1987. It had its first edition in 1986, second in 1991, third in 2000, and fourth in 2009. The fourth edition includes an audio CD of poems recited by the poet himself.

== Translation ==
The book was translated by Chandra Prakash Deval into Rajasthani in 1996. The title poem, Jatayu, has been translated by Rachel Dwyer into English.
