= Mansukhlal Jhaveri =

Indian poet, critic and literary historian (1907-1981)

- Born: Mansukhlal Maganlal Jhaveri; 3 October 1907; Jamnagar, Bombay Presidency
- Died: 27 August 1981 (aged 73); Mumbai
- Occupations: Poet, critic, literary historian
- Spouse: Hasmukhgauri Jhaveri
- Relatives: Anu Gadhia (daughter)
- Writing career
- Language: Gujarati
- Notable work: History of Gujarati Literature (1978)

Signature
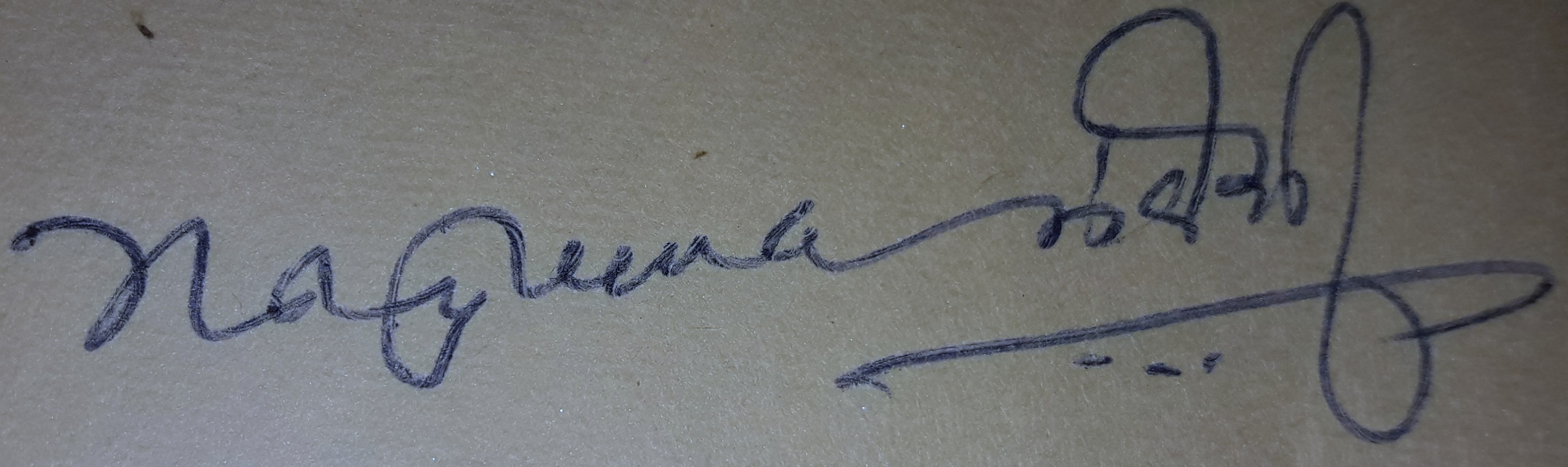

Mansukhlal Maganlal Jhaveri (1907–1981) was a Gujarati language poet, critic, and literary historian of the Gandhian era. He was deeply interested in classical Sanskrit poetry and authored History of Gujarati Literature (1978). Jhaveri had several pen-names including Devaki Ayodhya, Punarvasu, Madilant, Samintiyajak, and Siddhartha.

== Biography ==
Mansukhlal Jhaveri was born on 3 October 1907 in Jamnagar, Gujarat. He completed his primary and secondary education in Jamnagar and matriculated in 1931. He acquired a Bachelor of Arts in 1935 and a Master of Arts in 1937 from Samaldas College, Bhavnagar. He subsequently taught at Raiya College in Mumbai, Dharmendrasinhji College in Rajkot from 1940 to 1945, and St. Xavier's College in Mumbai from 1945 to 1958. From 1958 to 1963, he served as principal of Madhwani Arts and Commerce College, Porbandar. In 1966, he returned to Mumbai to teach but soon after became a principal at BEC College, Kolkata. He died on 27 August 1981 in Mumbai.

== Works ==
His first poetry collection, Chandradut (1929), is an adaptation of Meghadūta by Kālidāsa, written in Mandakranta meter. His other poetry collections are Phooldol (1933), Aaradhana (1939), Abhisar (1947), Anubhuti (1956) and Doomo Ogalyo (1975), which contain rhythmic poems about love, nature and God. Deeply influenced by classical Sanskrit poetry, Jhaveri also wrote poems on mythological themes such as Abhimanyu and Ashwatthama.

According to the Encyclopedia of Indian Literature, Jhaveri was a critic of the first order in the poet-critic tradition of Gujarati literature. He deeply studied Eastern and Western concepts of literary criticism and published several books of critical articles and reviews including Thoda Vivechan Lekho (1944), Paryeshana (1952), Kavyavimarsha (1962), Abhigam (1966), Govardhanram (1967), Nhanalal (1967), Kanaiylal Munshi (1970), Umashankar Joshi (1971), Gujarati Sahityabhasha (1972), Balwantrai Thakor (1976), Aapno Kavita Vaibhav Vol. 1 and 2 (1974, 1975), Drishtikon (1978), Gandhiyug Nu Sahitya (1978) and Umashankar Joshi – Natyakar (1979). In Aapno Kavita Vaibhav, he presented an anthology of Gujarati poetry from 1850 to 1973.

Jhaveri wrote History of Gujarati Literature (1978), in English. In collaboration with other writers, he wrote a history of Gujarati literature in Gujarati: Gujarati Sahityanu Rekhadarshan (1953).

Some of his works, including Gujarati Bhasha: Vyakaran ane Lekhan (1946), Bhasha Parichay Part 1 to 4 (1951 to 1957) and Vakapriththakaran ane Suddhalekhan (1965), are based on Gujarati grammar and language. Dashamskandha (1942), Mari Shrestha Vartao (1952), Navi Kavita (1952; with others), Gujarati Tunki Varta (1960), Dayaram (1960) and Aapna Urmikavyo (1976) are the compilations he edited.

Jhaveri translated Kalidasa's Abhijnanshakuntalam into Gujarati as Smritibramsha athva Shapit Shakuntala (1928). He also translated Shakespeare's Hamlet and Othello into Gujarati.

== See also ==
- List of Gujarati-language writers
