= Narsinhrao Divatia =

Gujarati poet from India (1859–1937)

Narsinhrao Divatia

Narsinhrao Divatia (1859–1937) was a poet, linguist and critic of Gujarati literature.

== Life ==
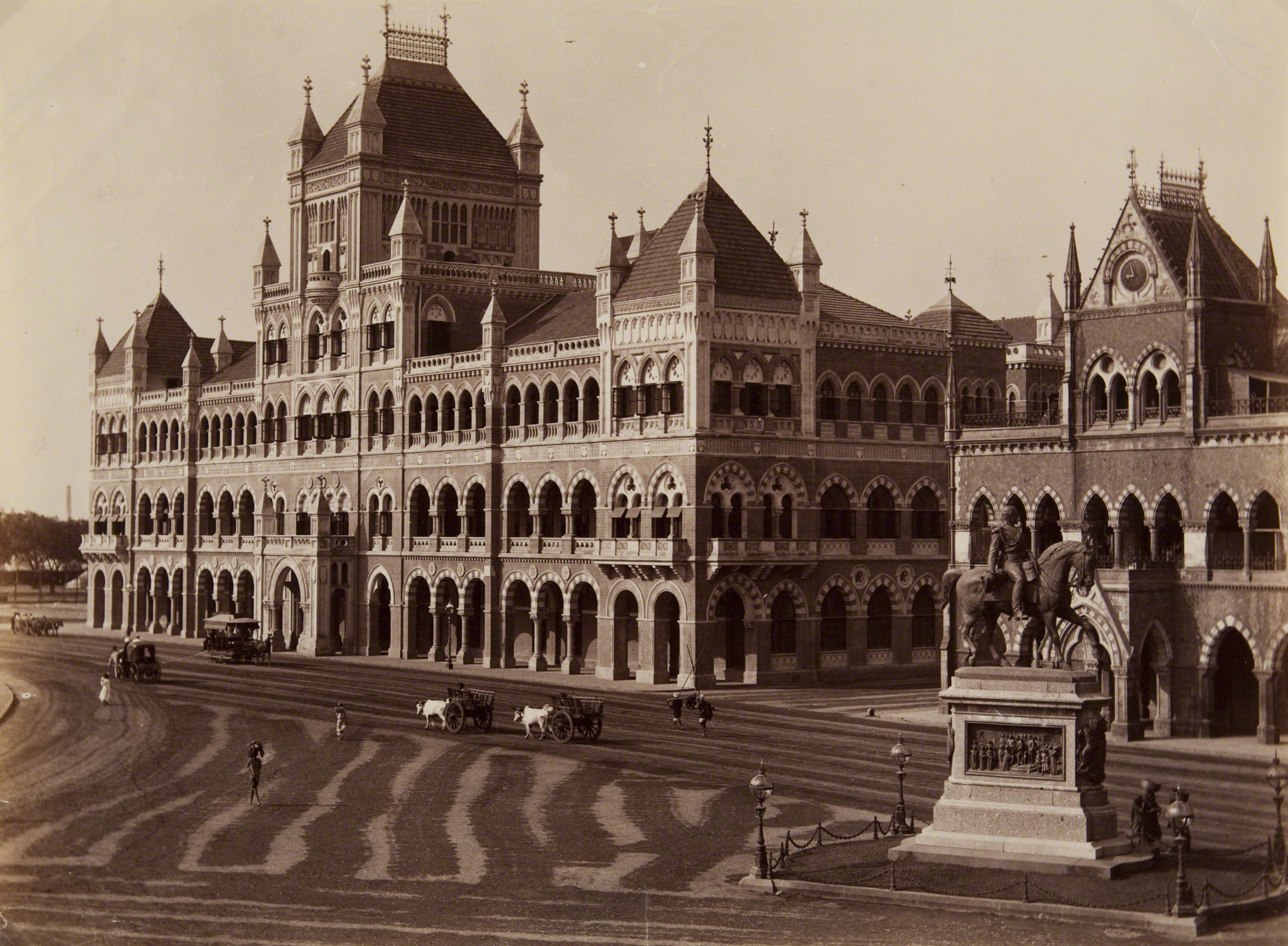
Elphinstone College in the late 19th century

He was born on 3 September 1859 in Ahmedabad to Bholanath Divetia. He completed Bachelor of Arts in Sanskrit from Elphinstone College in 1880 and stood first in University for which he was awarded Bhau Dajee Prize. He passed Indian Statutory Civil Service examination and was appointed Assistant Collector of Kera district in 1884. He retired early due to his ill health in 1912. He settled in Bombay and taught Gujarati at Elphinstone College in 1921 to 1935. He presided over Gujarati Sahitya Parishad in 1915. He was elected as a fellow of Bombay branch of Royal Asiatic Society in 1924. He died on 14 January 1937.

== Works ==
=== Poetry ===
He transferred the flow of Gujarati poetry into new pattern. He was the first poet of Gujarati to write lyrics in the pure western style. His first poetry collection was Kusumamala published in 1887. It was followed by Hridyavina (1896), Sarjatraini Sushupti (1912), Nupurzankar (1914), Smaran-Sanhita (1915). Smaran-Sanhita is an elegy written following death of his son Nalinkant which follows the style of British poet Tennyson's In Memoriam A.H.H.. He wrote the popular prayer Mangal Mandir Kholo in Gujarati.

=== Prose ===
His Smararanmukur (1926) is pen pictures of his contemporaries and predecessors. Vivartleela (1933) is a collection of essays written under pen name Gyanbal.

=== Criticism ===
The four volumes of Manomukur (1924, 1936, 1937, 1938), Abhinaya Kala (1930) and Gujarati language and literature (1932) are collections of essays and lectures of criticism.

=== Others ===
Buddhacharit (1934) is a Gujarati translation of Edwin Arnold's The Light of Asia. He was a pioneer linguist in Gujarati literature. As a linguist, his contributions are Wilson Philological Lectures Part 1 (1921) and Part 2 (1932).
