= Anandshankar Dhruv =

Gujarati scholar, writer, educationist and editor (1869-1942)

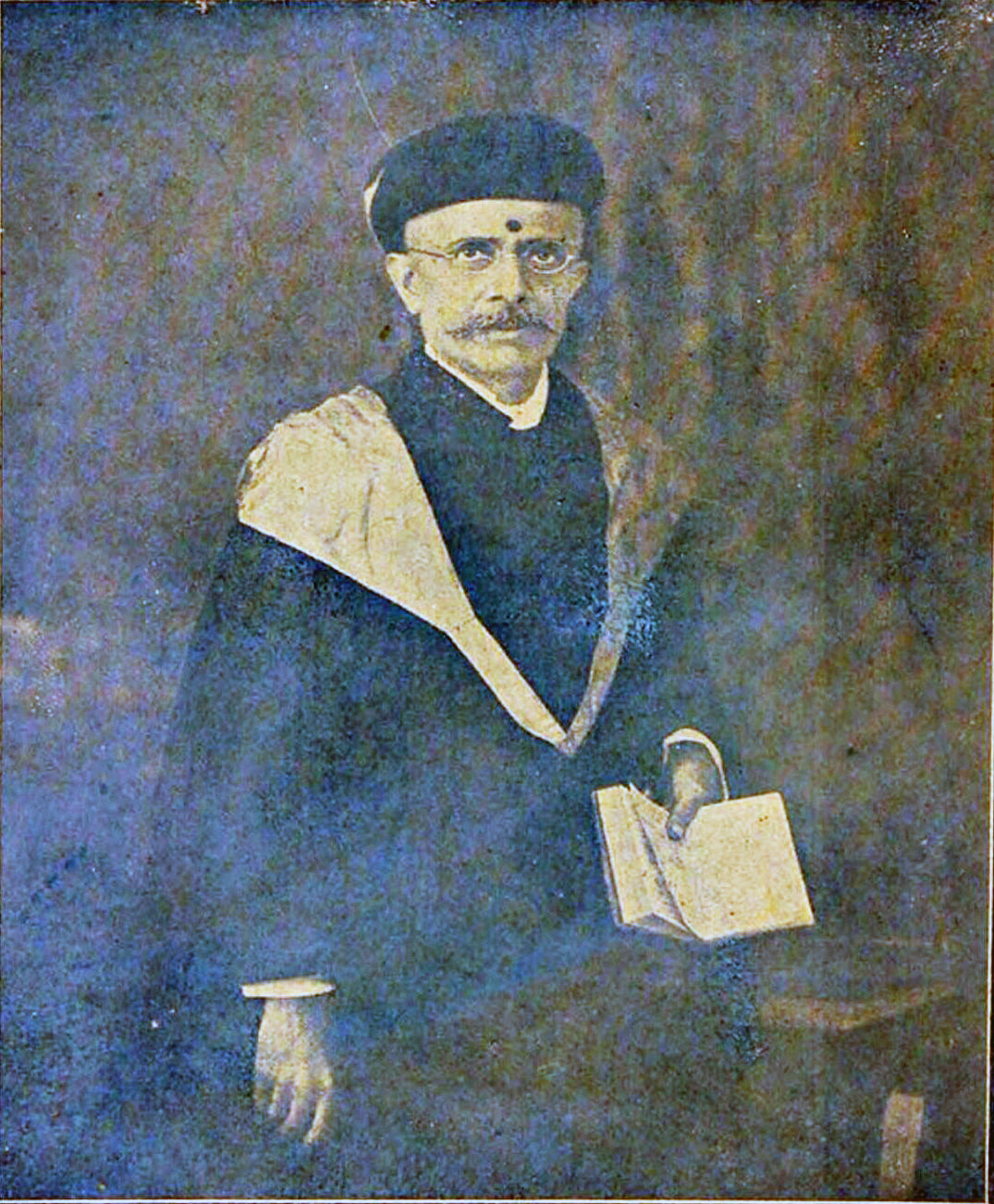
- Anandshankar Dhruv
- Born: 25 February 1869; Ahmedabad, Gujarat, India
- Died: 7 April 1942 (aged 73)
- Occupations: Author, editor
- Writing career
- Language: Gujarati
- Notable work: Apno Dharma (1916)

Anandshankar Bapubhai Dhruv (25 February 1869 – 7 April 1942) was a Gujarati scholar, writer, educationist and editor from Bombay Presidency, British India. His name is revered as "Acharya" (a learned person) in Gujarat, and hence generally he is known as Acharya Anandshankar Dhruv.

== Life ==
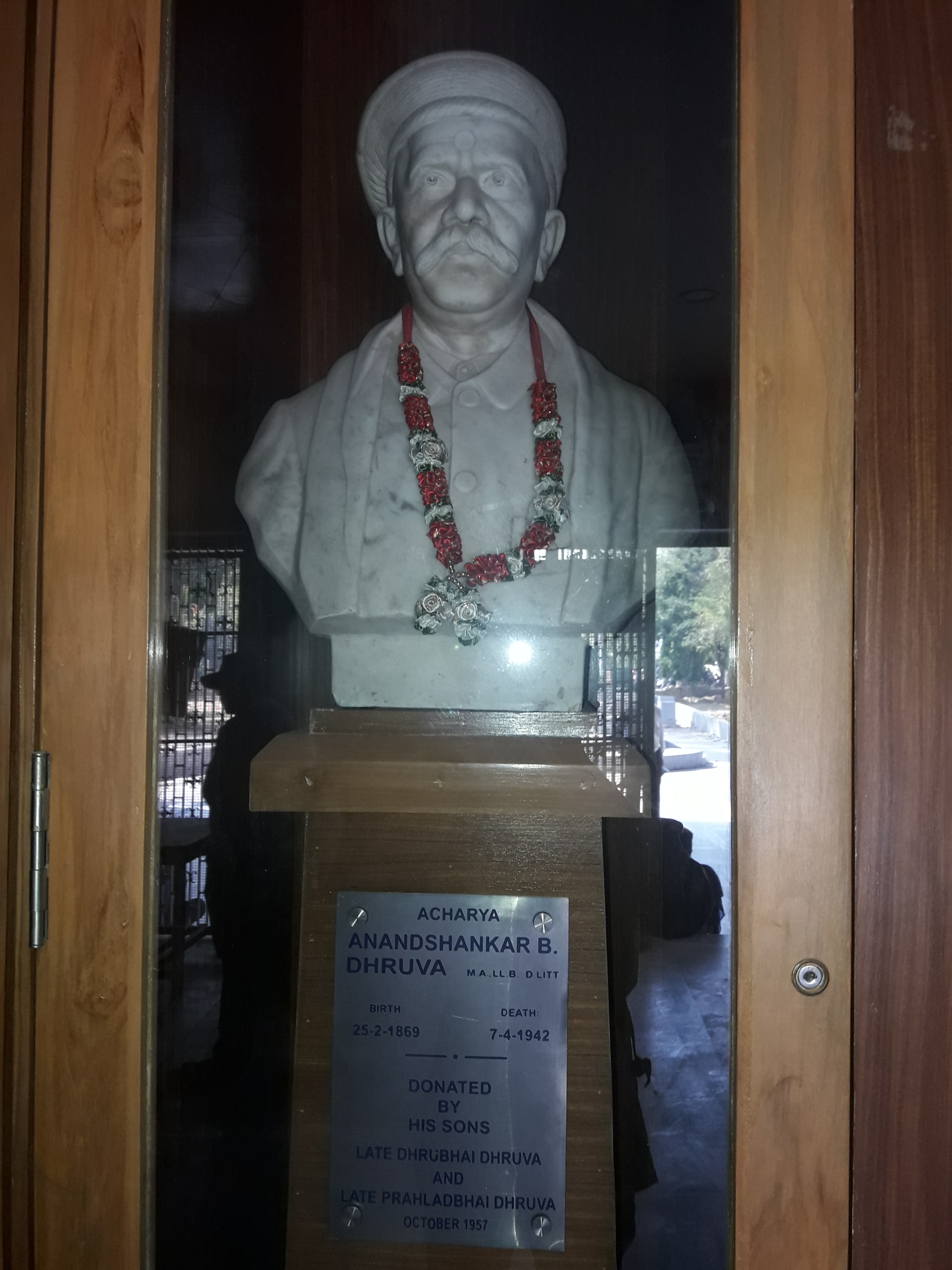
Bust of Anandshankar Dhruv at Gujarat University

Dhruv was born in Ahmedabad on 25 February 1869. His father was an officer of Kathiawar Agency and worked as an agent of Baroda State after retirement. He studied in English medium schools and learned Sanskrit at early age. While studying Master of Arts, he started teaching Sanskrit at Gujarat College in 1893. Later he taught at Elphinstone College for some years. He was appointed a Vice Chancellor of Banaras Hindu University in 1920. He performed the opening ceremony of The Modern School at Sicka Nagar, Bombay in 1936 established by Ramanbhai and Pushpaben Vakil. He was also a chairman of Inter University Board. He died on 7 April 1942.

== Works ==
His pen-names were Mumukshu and Hind-hitchintak. He headed several literary and linguistic organizations including Gujarati Sahitya Parishad and Philosophical Congress.

Dhruv wrote many books of Indian philosophy and Sanskrit literature as well as western philosophy and culture. Further, he has written several noted essays on religion and philosophy discussing the true essence of Hindu faith.

He translated Sri Bhasya, a philosophic work by Ramanuja, and wrote Hindu Dharma Ni Balpothi (a Primer of Hindu Religion) and Nitishikshan. Dhruv edited for some time Sudarshan, a magazine founded by Manilal Dwivedi, after Manila's death in 1898. And started his own monthly Vasant in 1902; which ran for some 36 years.

Dhruv's articles published in Vasant were later edited and collected by Ramnarayan Vishwanath Pathak and Umashankar Joshi, in five volumes. Of these, Apano Dharma (Our Religion) comprises his articles on religion and philosophy; Kavya Tattva Vichar is a collection of his articles on the essentials of poetry; Sahitya Vichar contains articles on applied criticism and education; Digdarshan is a collection of his writings on historical subjects; and Vichar Madhuri includes articles on miscellaneous subjects.

Anandshankar Dhruva : Lekhasanchay, a collection of selected writings by Dhruv, compiled and edited by Dhiru Parikh, was published in 2002 by Sahitya Akademi, New Delhi.

== See also ==
- List of Gujarati-language writers
