= Saraswatichandra (novel) =

Gujarati novel by Govardhanram Tripathi (1887–1901)

- Cover of English translation of 1st Part by Tridip Suhrud, 2015, cover artist: Binita Desai
- Author: Govardhanram M. Tripathi
- Original title: સરસ્વતીચંદ્ર
- Translator: Tridip Suhrud
- Language: Gujarati
- Publisher: Orient Blackswan (English ed.)
- Publication date: Part 1: 1887; Part 2: 1892; Part 3: 1898; Part 4: 1901
- Publication place: India
- ISBN: 81-260-2346-5
- OCLC: 933425258
- Dewey Decimal: 891.473
- Original text: સરસ્વતીચંદ્ર at Gujarati Wikisource

Saraswatichandra (pronounced [sʌrʌsvʌtɪtʃʌndr]) is a Gujarati novel by Govardhanram Madhavaram Tripathi, an author of late nineteenth century from Gujarat, India. Set in 19th-century India, It is acclaimed as one of the masterpiece of Gujarati literature. Though the novel was published in four parts, each part has a distinct thematic content, its own cast of characters and independent beginnings and ends. It was adapted into several plays, radio plays, films and TV series. It was well received by the number of critics, and was translated into several Indian languages, along with English. However, Suresh Joshi, a strong proponent of formalism theory, criticized the novel for its structural failure.

== Publication history ==
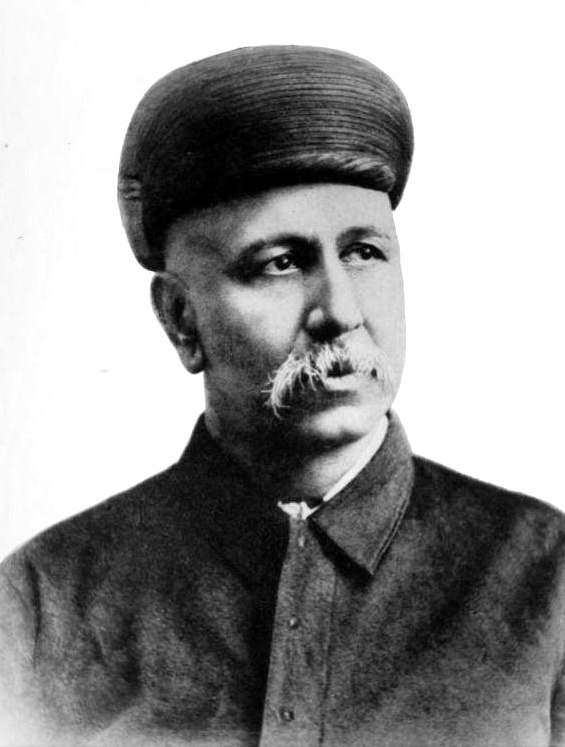
Govardhanram Tripathi

The novel takes its title after the name of its protagonist.

The novel was written over a period of 15 years, with the first volume being published in 1887 and the fourth one in 1901. Govardhanram began to write first part on 18 September 1885 and published it in April 1887. He started to write second part in 1888, completed in June 1891 and published it on 9 June 1892, and in the next year he started to write third part, which he completed in 17 October 1896 and published in 1898. On 20 December 1896, he started to write fourth part and completed it on 23 December 1901. The fourth part was published in 1902.

== Characters ==
There are about 150 characters in the novel, among which the principal characters are:

- Saraswatichandra – a young lawyer, an idealist
- Lakshminandan – Saraswatichandra's father, a rich merchant
- Gunasundari – Saraswatichandra's mother-in-law
- Kumud or Kumudsundari – betrothed to Saraswatichandra
- Buddhidhan – minister of Suvarnapur
- Pramadadhan – son of Buddhidhan
- Kusum – sister of Kumud
- Guman – stepmother of Saraswatichandra

== Structure ==
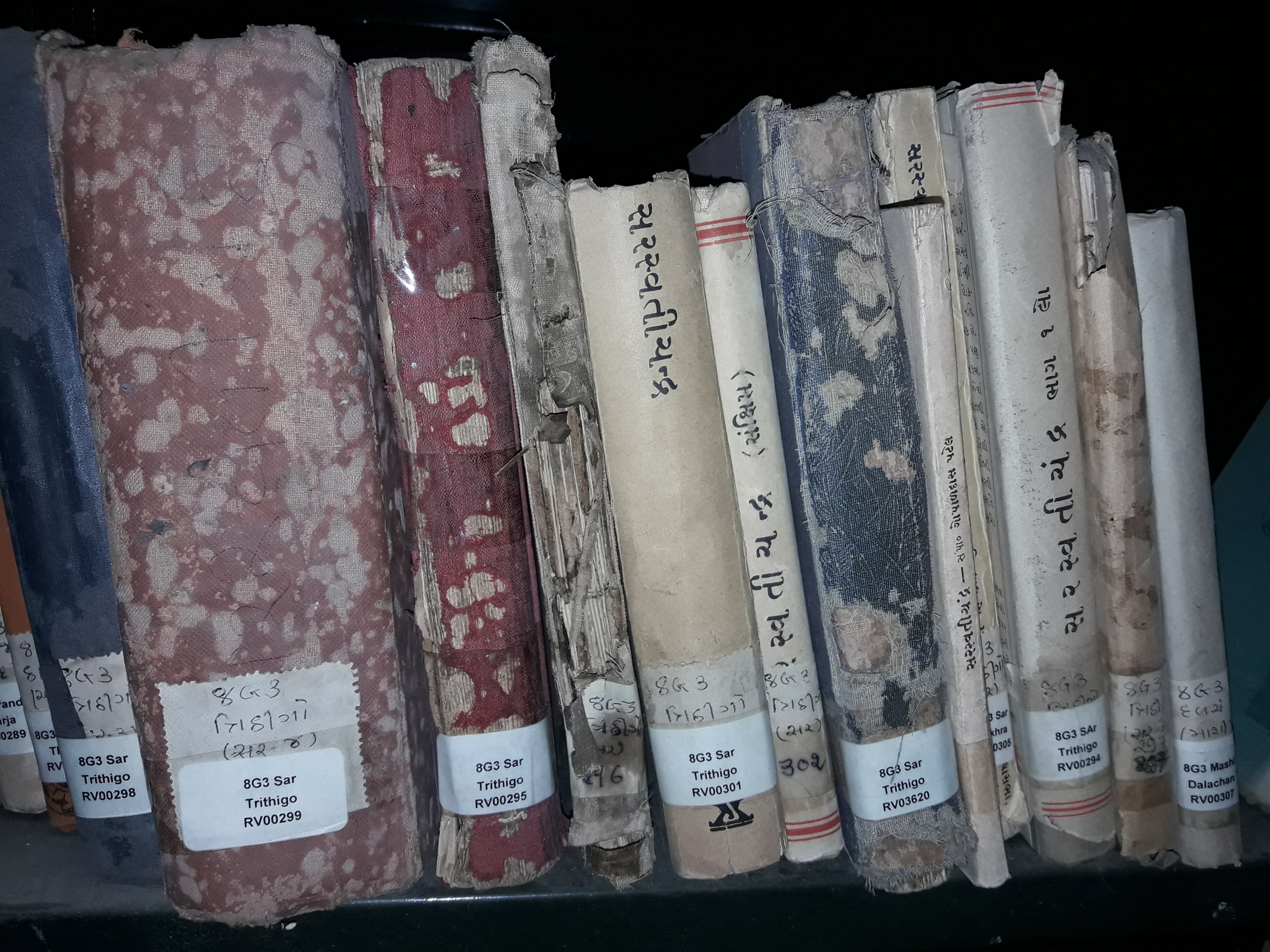
Volumes of Saraswatichandra at Gujarati Sahitya Parishad library

Spanned about in 2000 pages, the novel divided into four parts with subtitle: The Administration of Buddhidhan, The Family-maze of Gunasundari, The Political Administration of Ratnanagari and The Dreamland of Saraswati. As the titles suggest, the first part is about the administration of Buddhidhan, the second about Gunasundari's family life, the third about the politics of Ratnanagari, and the fourth about the consciousness of Saraswatichandra, the hero.

The novel begin with the Saraswatichandra's arrival in Suvarnapur and his meeting with Buddhidhan, a Divan of Suvarnapur. Hence, the first part gives an account of politics and conspiracy in Suvarnapur under the administration of Buddhidhan. At the end of the first part Kumud, wife of Pramadadhan who is a son of Buddhidhan, leaves Suvarnapur to visit her parents home. Thus, the second part gives an account of Kumud's family. As Kumud's father is a Divan in Ratnanagari, the third part is about the political administration of Ratnanagari. While all social, political and religious reflections are concentrated in the last part.

== Plot summary ==
The novel take place in two fictional towns, Suvarnapur and Ratnanagari.

Saraswatichandra, the protagonist of the novel, is a well educated, young lawyer deeply interested in literature, quite emotional and idealistic. He has been engaged to marry Kumudsundari (daughter of Vidyachatur – a Divan of Ratnanagari), a charming and proficient lady. But due to family conflicts, Saraswatichandra renounces his home. He assumes the name Navinchandra and starts his pilgrimage. As a result, Kumudsundari's parents marry her to Pramadadhan, the wayward son of Buddhidhan of Suvarnapur. Subsequently, Saraswatichandra (with the pseudonym of Navinchandra) arrives in Suvarnapur and has a meeting with Buddhidhan. Impressed by his eloquent talk and command over English, Buddhidhan invites him to stay with him. Saraswatichandra accepts Buddhidhan's proposal, resides at his home and finally becomes important member of Buddhidhan's family.

But soon after, Saraswatichandra leaves Buddhidhan's house due to the tensions that contact with Kumud is causing them both, but on the way, he is attacked by bandits. The Sadhus of Sundargiri pick him and nurse him. At the same night, Kumud also leaves Suvarnapur to visit her parents home and on the way, get attacked by the same bandits gang, but is saved by her grandfather, who had come halfway to receive her. Kumud somehow falls into the river and is picked up by Sadhvis at the bank of the river.

== Reception and criticism ==
"To the first part he (Govardhanram) gave all his art. The novel is imbued with aesthetic delight; the characterization is matchless. The second part depicts Hindu society, his art went deeper in the third part, and he gave all that he wished to give to the world in the fourth part."

— Mahatma Gandhi

Saraswatichandra has been described as a magnum opus of Govardhanram, and as a "highest pinnacle of Gujarati literature".

Anandshankar Dhruv described the novel as a purana; Vishwanath Bhatt called it an "epic in prose"; while Dolarrai Mankad hailed it as "Sakalakatha". Umashankar Joshi also appreciated the novel and called it "the poem of the Age written in prose". The size of Saraswatichandra was criticized in the context of form-content relationship. But, Ramnarayan V. Pathak observed that the looseness of the novel does not diminish from its aesthetic beauty. However, Suresh Joshi, a strong proponent of formalism, criticized the novel for its structural failure. One of his student and critic Suman Shah, also supported Joshi's statement.

K. M. Munshi called it the "gigantic" work of Govardhanram and wrote, "The Sarasvatichandra, as a work of fiction, is poor, but as a record of the impact of the West on the thought, outlook and life of India, it is the most outstanding work in Gujarati literature. It exerted profound influence on Gujarat during the last decade of the 19th century and the first decade of the 20th"

It is believed that Govardhanram has sketched his own various personality through this novel.

== Translation and adaptations ==
Saraswatichandra was translated and published in English by the director of Sabarmati Ashram, Tridip Suhrud, in four volumes starting 2015. Prior to that, Vinod Meghani had published its English translation in abridged form in 2006. The book was also translated into Hindi by Alok Gupta and Virendranarayan Sinh in 2015 and was published by Sahitya Akademi, New Delhi.

The novel was adapted in several plays, radio plays, films and TV series. One play was adapted in lifetime of Tripathi. One adapted was adapted by Raghunath Brahmbhatt of Nadiad which became very popular. It was adapted for radio too. The Hindi film Saraswatichandra (1968) was based on this novel. Chhotalal Rukhdev Sharma had adapted it into a play produced by Aryanitidarshak Natak Samaj which premiered on 11 March 1912.

The 1968 Hindi film was followed by 1972 Gujarati sequel film Gunsundari No Ghar Sansar, also directed by Govind Saraiya, which won the National Film Award for Best Feature Film in Gujarati at the 20th National Film Awards. The film was considered important for its artistry and aesthetic.

It was adapted in TV serials four times. The 2013 television series of the same name based on the novel was broadcast on Star Plus in 2013–14.

The novel was retold in abridged version by Sameer Acharya. The version was published by HarperCollins India in 2018.
