= Govardhanram Tripathi =

Gujarati novelist from India (1855-1907)

Govardhanram Madhavram Tripathi
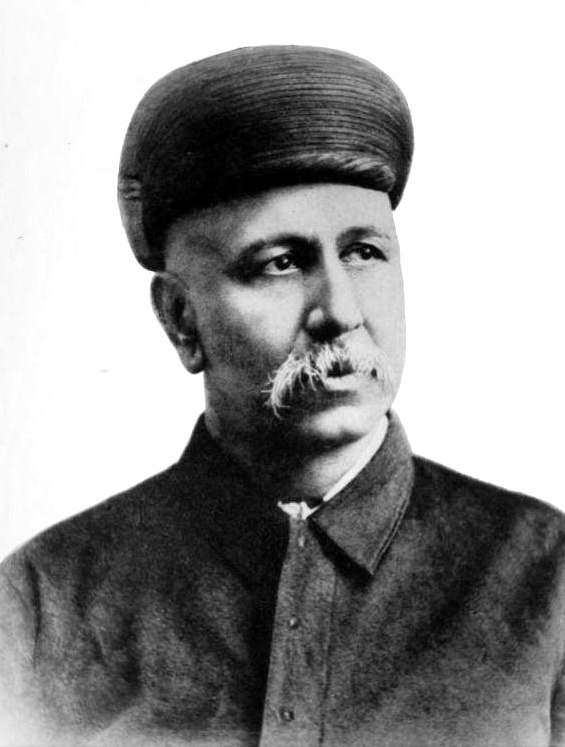
- Born: 20 October 1855; Nadiad, Bombay Presidency, British India
- Died: 4 January 1907 (aged 51); Bombay, Bombay Presidency, British India
- Occupations: Lawyer, novelist, poet, literary critic, literary historian
- Spouses: Harilakshmi (m. 1868; died 1874) Lalitagauri (m. 1875)
- Relatives: Mansukhram Tripathi (cousin)
- Writing career
- Notable works: Saraswatichandra; Scrap Book
- Website: Official website

Govardhanram Madhavram Tripathi (pronounced [ɡoʋəɾd̪ʱənɾɑːm mɑːd̪ʱəʋɾɑːm t̪ɾipɑʈʰiː]; 20 October 1855 – 4 January 1907) was an Indian Gujarati language novelist of the late 19th and early 20th centuries. He is known for his four volume novel, Saraswatichandra, acclaimed as one of the masterpieces of Gujarati literature. The novel represents the life of Gujarat during the early part of 19th-century.

== Life ==
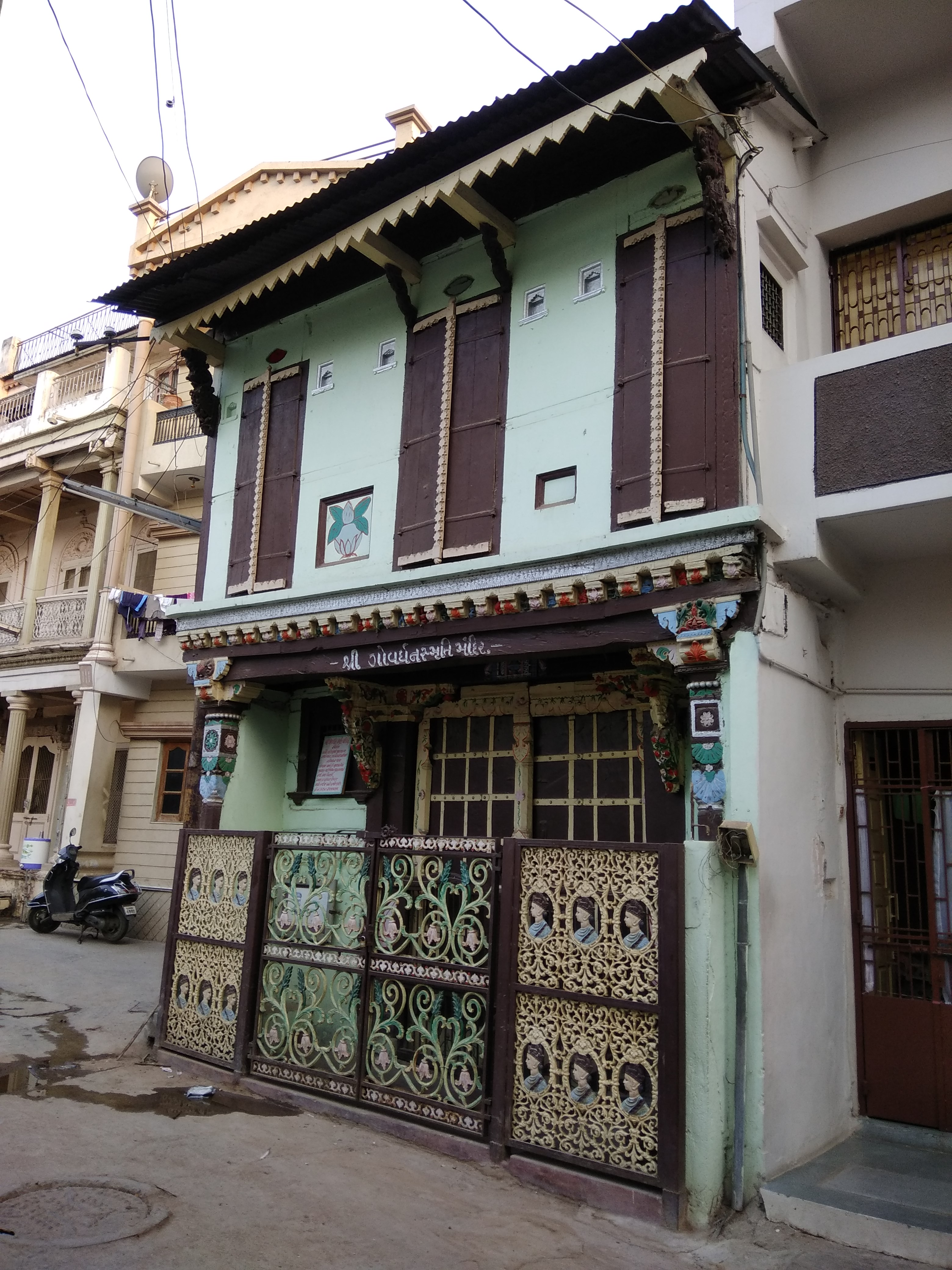
birthplace of Govardhanram in Nadiad

Govardhanram was born in Vaishnav Vadnagara Nagar brahmin family on 20 October 1855 on the day of the Dashera festival at Nadiad, Bombay presidency (now in Gujarat), to his mother, Shivkashi, and his father, Madhavram. His ancestors for at least three generations were money-lenders. He took his primary education from the Buddhivardhak Gujarati Shala in Mumbai and Government English School at Nadiad. Thereafter, he joined Elphinstone High School from where he passed his matriculation examination in 1871. In the same year, he joined Elphinstone College to obtain his BA degree. He passed his BA examination at the second attempt, in 1875.

After three unsuccessful attempts, he passed LLB examination in 1883, and started working as a lawyer in Mumbai in 1884. At the age of 43, he retired early and settled in his hometown to contribute to Gujarati literature and public service.

Govardhanram died in Mumbai on the evening of 4 January 1907 at T. K. Gajjar's Bunglow.

=== Personal life ===
In 1868, Govardhanram married Harilakshmi, who died in 1874 in a child birth, leaving behind a daughter, Radha, who also died soon after. In 1876, he married Lalitagauri, who gave birth to three daughters, Lilavati (b. 1881), Jashvanti (b. 1884) and Jayanti (b. 1888); and a son, Ramaniyaram (b. 1886). He was a younger cousin of Gujarati writer Mansukhram Tripathi.

== Works ==
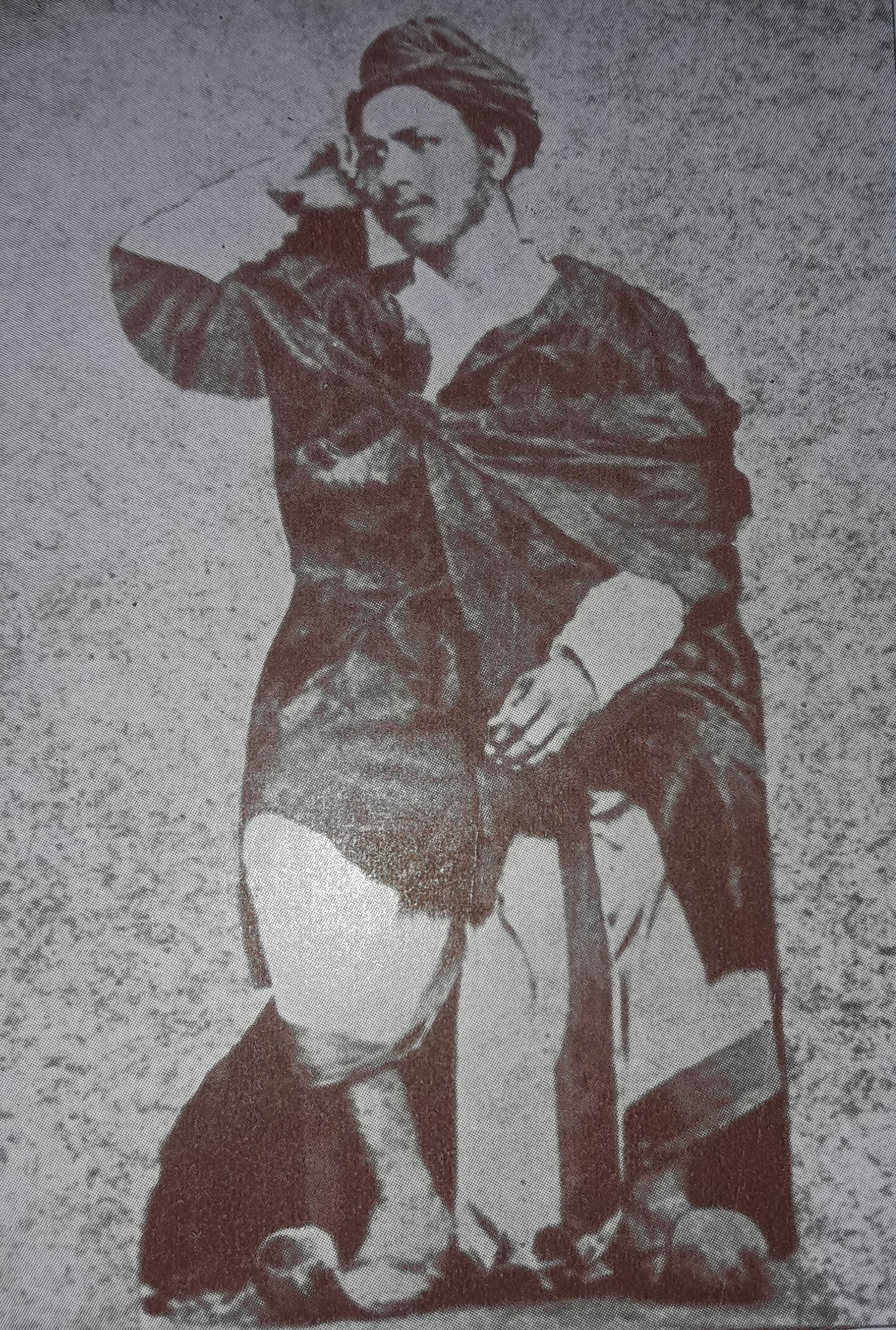
young Govardhanram

In 1875, he read a paper, A Rude Outline of the General Features of Practical Asceticism in My Sense of the World, before the Friendly Society. According to Gujarati critic Balwantray Thakore, this paper can be considered the key-stone of Govardhanram's ideology, aspiration and character.

In 1887, the first volume of Saraswatichandra was published, and was followed by volumes 2, 3 and 4 in 1892, 1898, and 1901, respectively; each volume has a separate subtitle: The Administration of Buddhidhan, The Family-maze of Gunasundari, The Political Administration of Ratnanagari and The Dreamland of Saraswati. The novel represents the life of Gujarat during the early part of 19th-century and also focuses on contemporary social, political, philosophical and cultural issues. It is believed that Govardhanram has sketched his own various personalities through this novel.

He also took an active role in the Indian Congress during 1902; and in 1905, he was elected as the first president of Gujarati Sahitya Parishad. He also wrote various articles and essays in the papers 'Vasant' and 'Samalochak', which were later published as books.

Govardhanram Tripathi
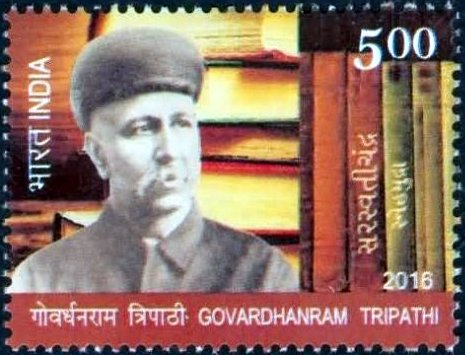
- A commemorative postage stamp on Govardhanram Tripathi was issued on 27th April, 2016 by Department of Posts, Government of India.
- Type: Commemorative Stamp
- Country of issue: India
- Date of issue: 27th April, 2016
- No. printed: 0.30 million
- Face value: INR 05.00

His other works include Snehamudra, Leelavati Jeevankala (Lilavati's Art of Living), Navalramnu Kavijeevan (Navalram's life as a poet), Dayaramno Akshardeh (The Literary Works of Dayaram), Sadavastu Vichar, and Scrap Book, an autobiographical work.

His Classical Poets of Gujarat is a critical work with a historical approach. It discusses Gujarati poets Mira, Narsinh Mehta, Akho, Premananda and Shamal; and the influence of these poets and their works on society and morals.

== Legacy ==
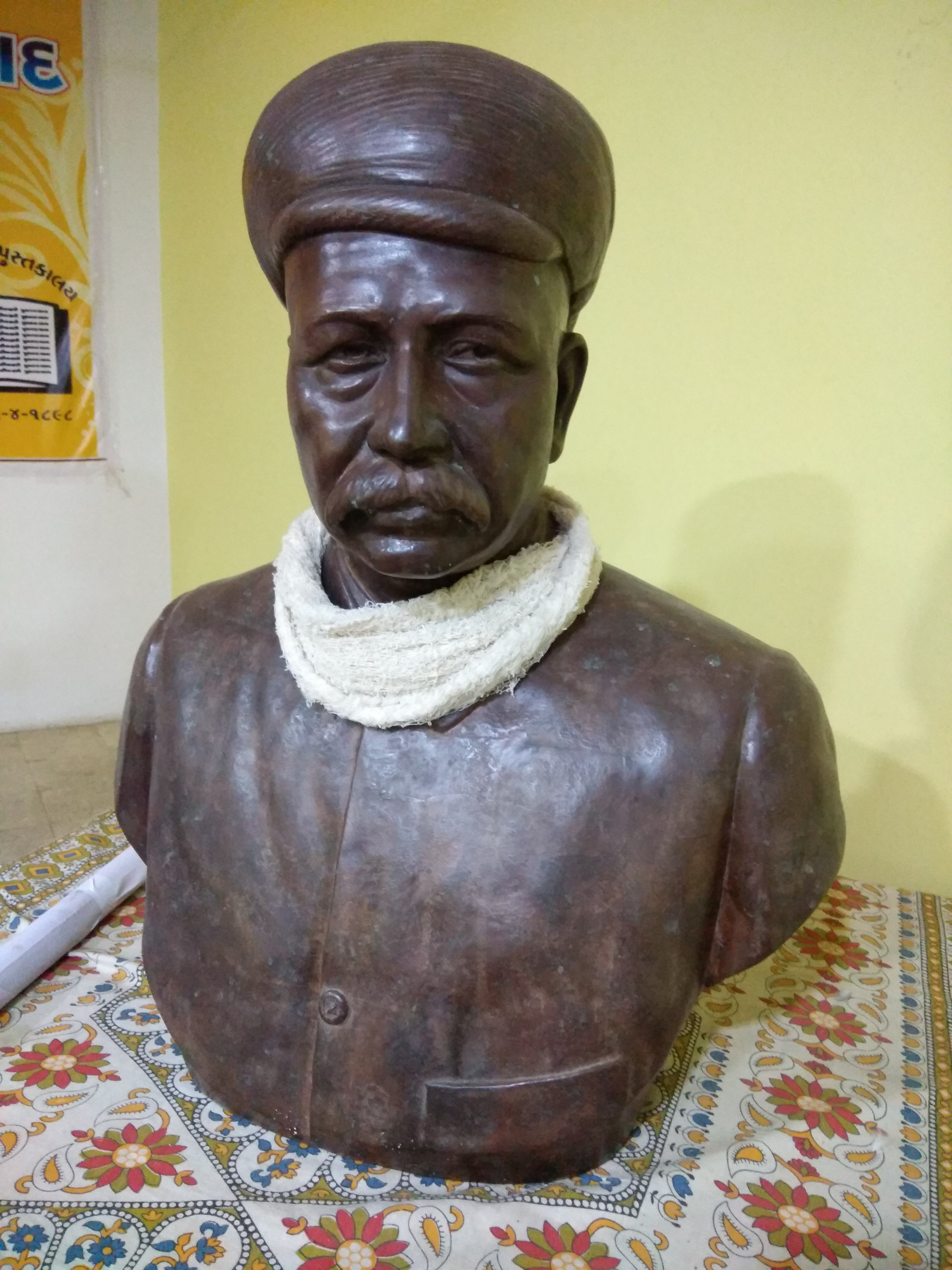
bust in Nadiad

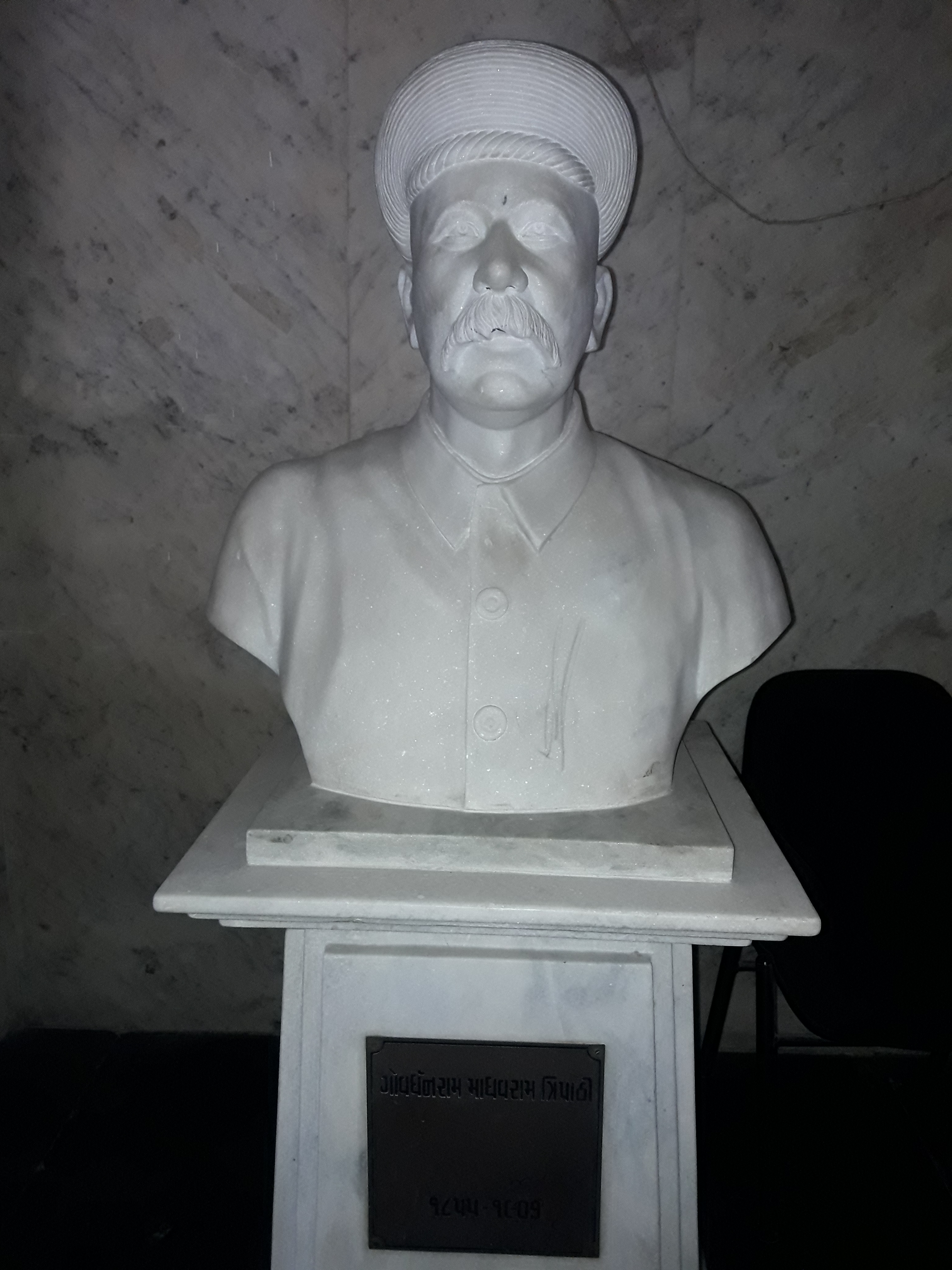
bust in Gujarati Sahitya Parishad

Bust of Govardhanram Tripathi

The period from 1885 to 1915 is called "Govardhan-Yug" or "Govardhan-Era" in Gujarati literature. On 27 April 2016, a commemorative postage stamp was released by Indian Posts to honour Govardhanram Tripathi. The Chief Minister of Gujarat, Anandiben Patel, released the postage stamp in Gandhinagar.

== Sources ==
- Suhrud, Tridip (1999). "Consumption as Dharma: Govardhanram Tripathi and the Dissolution of the Self" (PDF). Narrations of a Nation: Explorations Through Intellectual Biographies (Ph.D thesis). Ahmedabad: School of Social Sciences, Gujarat University. hdl:10603/46631.
