= DTJ =

DTJ may refer to:

- D-topia Entertainment, a Japanese record label (formerly DTJ)
- Dělnická tělovýchovná jednota (Workers' Gymnastics Club), successor to the Czech Sokol movement
- Detroj railway station, Gujarat, India
- Destroy The Joint, an online Australian feminist group
- Donald Trump Jr. (born 1977), American businessman

== See also ==
- DJT (disambiguation)
