= Aniruddh Brahmabhatt =

Indian poet

- Born: Aniruddh Lalji Brahmabhatt; 11 November 1937; Patan, Gujarat
- Died: 31 July 1981 (aged 43); Ahmedabad, Gujarat
- Education: M. S. University
- Occupations: Poet, critic, short story writer
- Writing career
- Language: Gujarati
- Period: Modern Gujarati literature
- Notable work: Aristotle Nu Kavyashastra (1969)

Aniruddh Lalji Brahmabhatt was a Gujarati writer from Gujarat, India. He was poet, critic, biographer and short story writer.

== Life ==
He was born on 11 November 1937 at Patan, Gujarat. His family belonged to Detroj. He completed his school and college education from Vadodara. In 1958, he completed BA with Gujarati and Sanskrit from M. S. University. He passed MA with the same subject in 1960. He started teaching at Arts College of Dabhoi in 1959 and later joined college in Bilimora. In 1968, he became Reader in School of Languages, Gujarat University. He was an editor of Bhumika (later Kimapi) magazine. He died in Ahmedabad on 31 July 1981 due to Leukemia.

He started his creative journey while studying at M.S. University, where he was a student of Suresh Joshi and a contemporary of emerging creative talents such as poet-painter Ghulam Mohammed Sheikh. Through his writings and mentorship he inspired many modern-day poets and writers, including Yogesh Joshi and Tushar Shukla.

== Works ==
He was a modernist Gujarati poet and critic.

His works have been translated into Hindi, English and Russian languages. Anviksha (1970) is his work of criticism which includes 24 essays; eight on work and authors and fifteen on books. Gujarati Sahityavivechanna Ketlak Payana Sanpratyayo is his important article on criticism. Bharatiya Sahityashastrama Gun ane Ritini Vicharana (1974) is study of literary contribution of historical Indian figures. Purvapar (1976) is a collection of articles from his column 'Alapjhalap' in Gujarati daily Janmabhoomi. Puruandar (1970) was his another work of criticism. Sannikarsh (1982) is his posthumously published work of criticism.

Aristotle Nu Kavyashastra (1969) was the first Gujarati translation of Aristotle's Poetics. Chekhov (1978) is short biography of Russian novelist Anton Chekhov published by Parichay Trust.

Kimapi (1983) is collection of original and translated poems. Ajanyu Station (1982) is collection of stories. Namroop (1981) is collection of short biographies and caricatures of people briefly associated with his life. Chal Man Vate Ghat (1981-82) is five parts collection of articles published in daily columns. Rishivani (1982) is collection of his column published in Akhandanand magazine under his pen name Parth. It is about Indian culture and thought based on Upnishad.

He edited studies on authors such as Jhaverchand Meghani (1969), Manishankar Bhatt - Kant (1971), Ramanbhai Neelkanth (1973). He also edited studies on works such as Kanta (1973) by Manilal Nabhubhai, Sudamacharitra (1975) and Premanandkrit Kunvarbainu Mameru (1982) by Premanand Bhatt. He also edited some works himself and with others such as Jayanti Dalalni Pratinidhi Vartao (1971), Natak Vishe Jayanti Dalal (1974), Patilna Chuntela Kavyo (1974), Samvad (1974), Gujarati Vartao (1977) and Absurd (1977).

Audio recordings of some of his work in his voice have been made available at the Ekatra Foundation.These recordings underscore the observation by Umashankar Joshi that his voice had a great combination of melody and strength and his orations conveyed thought-stream not just word-stream.
