= Bapulal Nayak =

Indian stage actor, director and manager (1879–1947)

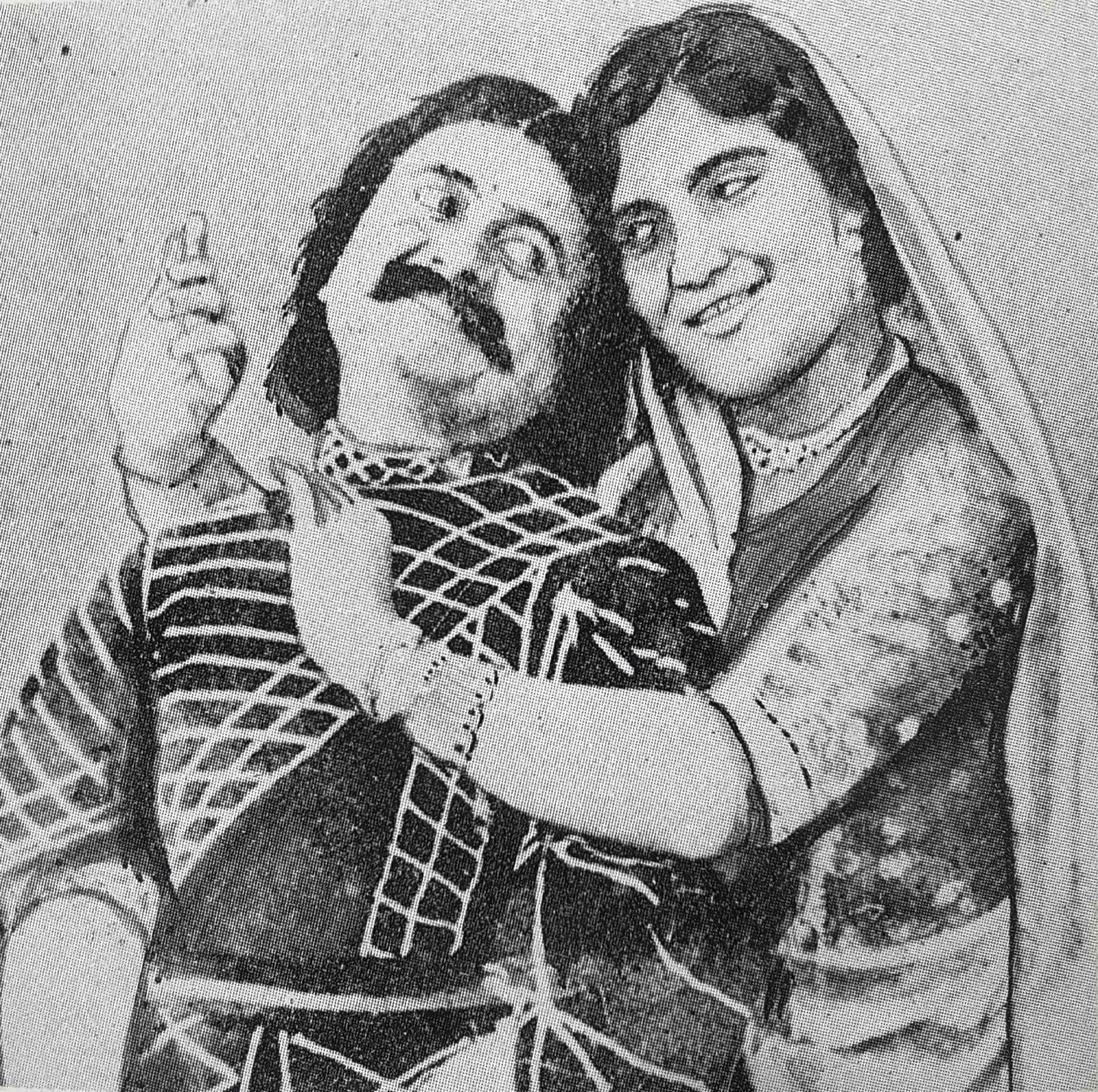
- Bapulal Nayak (left) with Jaishankar Bhojak 'Sundari' in a play Sneh-Sarita in 1915. They acted in several successful plays together.
- Born: Narayan Bhabhaldas Nayak; 25 March 1879; Gerita, Mehsana, Baroda State, British India
- Died: 4 December 1947 (aged 68); Undhai near Mehsana, Baroda State, British India
- Occupations: Stage actor, director, manager
- Years active: 1890–1946
- Parents: Bhabhaldas (father); Narbhiben (mother)

Bapulal Nayak (25 March 1879 – 4 December 1947) was an Indian stage actor, director and manager of the early Gujarati theatre. Born into a family of traditional folk theatre performers, he joined the theatre company Mumbai Gujarati Natak Mandali at a young age. His acting was well received in his initial roles. He was involved in stage planning and managing and later became a partner in the company. He rose to fame and acted in several successful plays with Jaishankar Bhojak 'Sundari', who played female roles opposite him. He acted in plays written by Mulshankar Mulani, Gajendrashnakar Pandya and Nrisinh Vibhakar. He wrote and directed several plays and eventually bought the theatre company. After a career lasting five decades, he retired after his company suffered heavy loss with the advent of the cinema.

== Biography ==
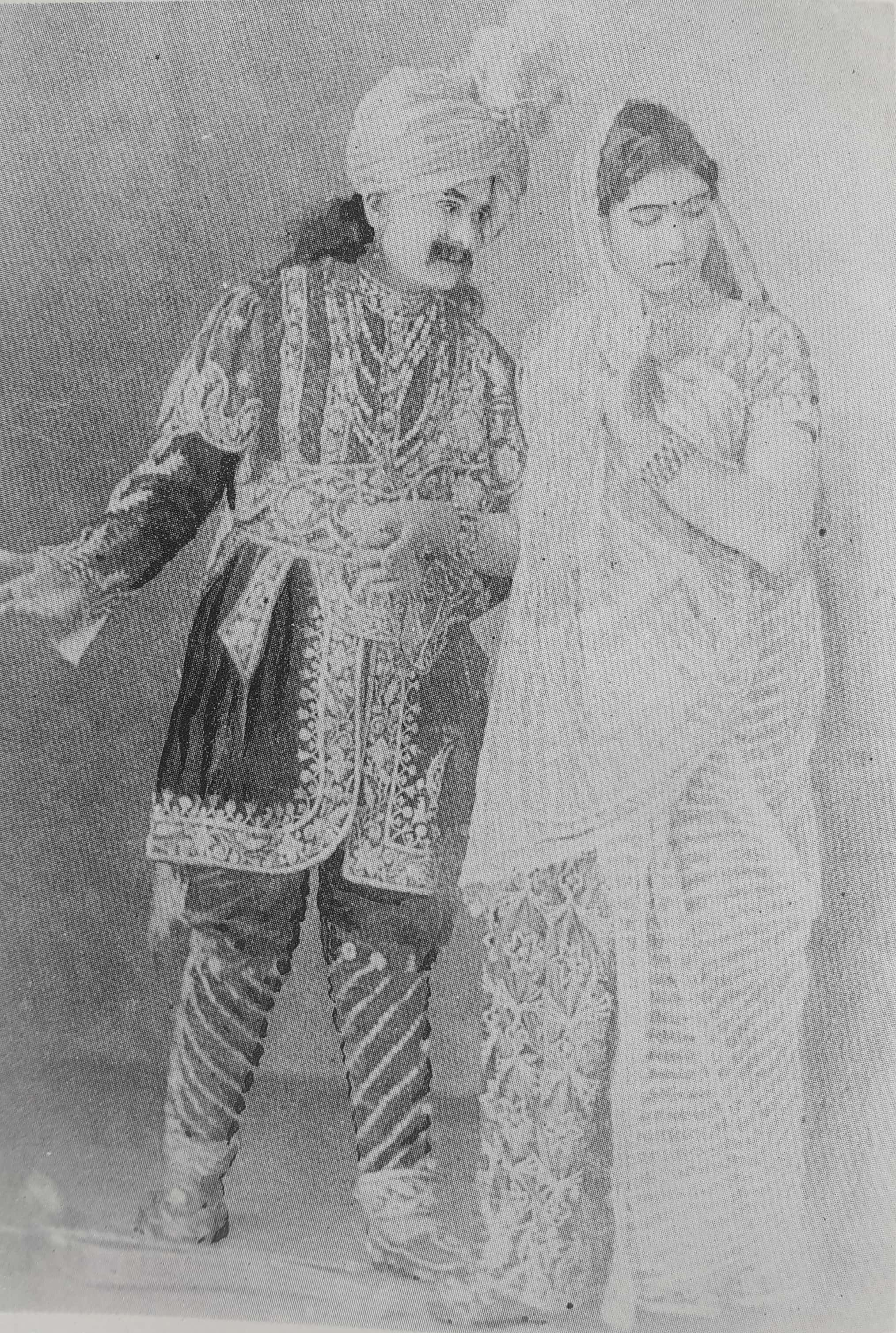
Bapulal Nayak (left) and Jaishankar Bhojak 'Sundari' in the play Kamlata, at Gaiety Theatre, Bombay, 1904

Nayak was born in Gerita near Mehsana on 25 March 1879 and was named Narayan by his parents Bhabhaldas Khemchand Nayak and Narbhiben. He studied till the fifth standard in the Gujarati school in his native village Undhai. He was nicknamed Bapulal by his father. In Februatry 1890, at the age of eleven, he quit the family tradition of performing Bhavai (folk theatre) and farming, and started his stage career with Dayashankar Visanji Bhatt's Mumbai Gujarati Natak Mandali for a salary of three rupees per month. He was given a role of Jayant, son of Indra, in a play, Harishchandra (1890). He next appeared in Rajbeej (King's Progeny, 1891), a play written by Mulshankar Mulani specifically for him which premiered at the Geity Theatre in Bombay. It was successful. His performance as Mularaja in Mularaj Solanki (1895) was well received. In the next decade, he acted Ramcharitra (1989), Raman in Lakshadhipati-no Raman, Jayraj (1898) and other plays, as well as becoming involved in stage planning and the management of a theatre company. In 1899, he and Mulani became partners in the company, each holding a 6% share of the Mumbai Gujarati Natak Mandali. He also acted in the acclaimed play, Ajabkumari (1899), opposite female impersonator actor Jaishankar Bhojak 'Sundari' who had recently joined their company. The pair soon rose to fame and acted together in several successful plays including Saubhagya Sundari (Fortunate Sundari, 1901), Vikram Charitra (1901, directed by him), Dage Hasrat (1901), Jugal Jugari (Jugal the Gambler, 1903), Kamlata (1904), Sneh Sarita (1915), Madhubansari (1917). Around the end of the 19th century, he was guided by Mulshankar and Dayashankar Visanji. He learned direction from Sorabji Katrak. He trained many actors as well.

Nand-Batrisi (1906) was a first play written by him which was well received. He also wrote Chandrabhaga (1909), a farce entitled Navalsha Hirji (1909), Anandlahari (1919) and Saubhagya-no Sinh (1925). When Mulani's three plays failed consequently, he chose to stage nationalistic plays written by Nrisinh Vibhakar. These plays experimented with story and theme but enactment stayed unchanged. During this period, Mahatma Gandhi had arrived in India from South Africa and the Indian independence movement was gathering steam. He acquired Mumbai Gujarati Natak Mandali in April 1922.

Bapulal Nayak started directing his plays and started adapting literature into plays. He chose Ramanbhai Neelkanth's play Raino Parvat written in 1911 and staged it in 1926. The songs of the play were written by Rasiklal Parikh and four shows of it were staged. Later he staged four plays written by Champshi Udeshi, four plays written by Gajendrashankar Pandya as well as many Parsi theatre styled plays. Gajendrashankar Pandya's play College Kanya was staged by Bapulal and it created controversy due to some of its dialogue about females; Narsinhrao Divetia, Chandravadan Mehta and Hansa Jivraj Mehta led the public protests against the play.

With the advent of the cinema, the theatre started to lose its audience. Bapulal was forced to sell his company in 1938 due to it suffering heavy losses. In 1944, he tried to revive his company with the help of a financier. He retired after staging his last play Ladakvayo, written by Prafulla Desai, in 1946. He had acted in more than a hundred plays, directed forty seven plays and written six plays during his career. He also wrote some poems. He died on 4 December 1947 in Undhai near Mehsana, Baroda State.

== Reception ==
P. K. Nayyar, a columnist of Sanjvartaman daily of Bombay, called him "one of the best actors in the world" in 1917. Rasiklal Parikh, Chandravadan Mehta and Pragji Dosa have praised the excellence of his directing.

== Stage ==
Acting career
Date	Title	Role	Writer	Theatre company
10 August 1889	Shakuntal	Sarvadaman	Mulshankar Mulani	Mumbai Gujarati Natak Mandali
9 August 1890	Harishchandra	Jayant	Vishwanath Prabhuram Vaidya	Mumbai Gujarati Natak Mandali
22 January 1891	Rajbeej	Beej	Mulshankar Mulani	Mumbai Gujarati Natak Mandali
27 February 1892	Kundabala	Chand	Mulshankar Mulani	Mumbai Gujarati Natak Mandali
15 August 1892	Rasikmani	Mohan	Narabheshankar Manchharam Vyas	Mumbai Gujarati Natak Mandali
2 December 1893	Sundar Veni	Sundarlal	–	Mumbai Gujarati Natak Mandali
3 November 1894	Premkala	Premrai	Vijayshankar Kalidas Bhatt	Mumbai Gujarati Natak Mandali
27 April 1895	Mevadno Pratapi Chand	Mokal	Vijayshankar Kalidas Bhatt	Mumbai Gujarati Natak Mandali
19 October 1895	Mularaj Solanki	Mularaja	Vijayshankar Kalidas Bhatt	Mumbai Gujarati Natak Mandali
5 September 1896	Karanghelo	Beejkhan	Mulshankar Mulani	Mumbai Gujarati Natak Mandali
14 August 1897	Barrister	Shankar	Mulshankar Mulani	Mumbai Gujarati Natak Mandali
8 January 1898	Ramcharitra	Ram	Vijayshankar Kalidas Bhatt	Mumbai Gujarati Natak Mandali
23 April 1898	Pushpasen Pushpavati	Pushpasen	–	Mumbai Gujarati Natak Mandali
27 August 1898	Jayraj	Jayraj	Mulshankar Mulani	Mumbai Gujarati Natak Mandali
8 July 1899	Tilakkumar	Tilakkumar	Vijayshankar Kalidas Bhatt	Mumbai Gujarati Natak Mandali
30 September 1899	Ajabkumari	Randhir	Mulshankar Mulani	Mumbai Gujarati Natak Mandali
16 December 1899	Veer Mandal	Pratapsinh	Mulshankar Mulani	Mumbai Gujarati Natak Mandali
14 February 1900	Mohini	Kalyandev	Vijayshankar Kalidas Bhatt	Mumbai Gujarati Natak Mandali
7 July 1900	Vikramcharitra	Rajratan	Mulshankar Mulani	Mumbai Gujarati Natak Mandali
19 October 1901	Saubhagya Sundari	Saubhagya	Mulshankar Mulani	Mumbai Gujarati Natak Mandali
26 August 1902	Jugal Jugari	Jugal	Mulshankar Mulani	Mumbai Gujarati Natak Mandali
18 October 1904	Kamlata	Meenketu	Mulshankar Mulani	Mumbai Gujarati Natak Mandali
1906	Nandbatrisi	Vilochan	Bapulal Nayak	Mumbai Gujarati Natak Mandali
1908	Sangatno Rang	Lalaji	–	Mumbai Gujarati Natak Mandali
22 May 1909	Chandrabhaga	Ratansinh	Bapulal Nayak	Mumbai Gujarati Natak Mandali
3 November 1909	Navalsha Heerji	Navalsha	Mulshankar Mulani	Mumbai Gujarati Natak Mandali
17 December 1910	Vasantprabha	Vasantsen	Mulshankar Mulani	Mumbai Gujarati Natak Mandali
1911	Devkanya	Kishor	Mulshankar Mulani	Mumbai Gujarati Natak Mandali
1912	Krishnacharitra	Baldev	Mulshankar Mulani	Mumbai Gujarati Natak Mandali
31 January 1914	Prataplakshmi	Pratap	Mulshankar Mulani	Mumbai Gujarati Natak Mandali
28 February 1915	Sangatna Fal	Kant	Mulshankar Mulani	Mumbai Gujarati Natak Mandali
19 September 1915	Sneh Sarita	Shenchandra	Nrisinh Vibhakar	Mumbai Gujarati Natak Mandali
5 August 1916	Sudhachandra	Chandrakumar	Nrisinh Vibhakar	Mumbai Gujarati Natak Mandali
28 July 1917	Madhubansari	Madhusudan	Nrisinh Vibhakar	Mumbai Gujarati Natak Mandali
23 November 1918	Meghmalini	Meghdoot	Nrisinh Vibhakar	Mumbai Gujarati Natak Mandali
23 August 1919	Anandlahari	Laharikant	Bapulal Nayak	Mumbai Gujarati Natak Mandali
25 September 1920	Vishwaleela	Vishwadev	Ambashankar Harishankar Upadhyay	Mumbai Gujarati Natak Mandali
25 April 1925	Saubhagyano Sinh	Mansinh	Bapulal Nayak	Mumbai Gujarati Natak Mandali
1926	Madandh Mahila Yane Noorjahan	Sher Afghan	Jayshankar Vaghajibhai Vyas	Mumbai Gujarati Natak Mandali
1926	Kumali Kali	Pranjeevan	Shayda	Mumbai Gujarati Natak Mandali
1927	Jamanano Rang	Dhanraj	Gajendrashankar Lalshankar Pandya	Mumbai Gujarati Natak Mandali
1928	Tarunina Tarang	Padmakumar	Gajendrashankar Lalshankar Pandya	Mumbai Gujarati Natak Mandali
1928	Kashmirnu Prabhat	Devakar	Gajendrashankar Lalshankar Pandya	Mumbai Gujarati Natak Mandali
21 February 1929	Kudaratno Nyay	Kantilal	Gajendrashankar Lalshankar Pandya	Mumbai Gujarati Natak Mandali
29 March 1929	Up-to-date Mavali	Sorabji	Joseph David	Mumbai Gujarati Natak Mandali
1929	Swamibhakti Yane Baji Deshpande (Hindi)	Heeroji	Munshi Mohiyuddin Naza	Mumbai Gujarati Natak Mandali
27 January 1929	Kimiyagar	Shripatrai	'Manasvi' Prantijwala (rewritten)	Mumbai Gujarati Natak Mandali
9 January 1930	Kuldeepak	Shantilal	Gajendrashankar Lalshankar Pandya	Mumbai Gujarati Natak Mandali
January 1931	Kutil Rajneeti	Shivaji	Gajendrashankar Lalshankar Pandya	Mumbai Gujarati Natak Mandali
23 January 1932	Karmasanjog	Dharmadas	Mugatlal Pranjeevan Oza	Mumbai Gujarati Natak Mandali
1932	Karyasiddhi (Hindi)	Duple	'Manasvi' Prantijwala (adaptation)	Mumbai Gujarati Natak Mandali
9 September 1933	Kon Samrat?	Bhimdev	'Manasvi' Prantijwala (rewritten)	Mumbai Gujarati Natak Mandali
1934	Kirtivijay	Ratnapal	'Manasvi' Prantijwala	Mumbai Gujarati Natak Mandali
13 September 1934	Jeenjarna Zankare	Ramsinh	Champshi Udeshi	Mumbai Gujarati Natak Mandali
20 March 1935	Mumbaini Badi	Sukhlaji	Joseph David	Mumbai Gujarati Natak Mandali
1 June 1935	Gheli Guniyal	Kanchanlal	Champshi Udeshi	Mumbai Gujarati Natak Mandali
January 1936	Kiritkumar	Vijayvarma	Manilal 'Pagal'	Mumbai Gujarati Natak Mandali
February 1936	Nepolian	Francis	Manilal 'Pagal'	Mumbai Gujarati Natak Mandali
15 May 1937	Shataranjna Dav	Shripal	Champshi Udeshi	Mumbai Gujarati Natak Mandali
7 August 1937	Gareebna Ansu	Varjabhushan	Champshi Udeshi	Mumbai Gujarati Natak Mandali
19 November 1938	Sukhi Sansar	Bhanuprasad	Champshi Udeshi	Mumbai Gujarati Natak Mandali
11 March 1939	Kalankit Kon?	Bakshi Sheth	Chimanlal Trivedi	Mumbai Gujarati Natak Mandali
