= Mumbai Gujarati Natak Mandali =

- Formation: 1878
- Dissolved: 1948
- Type: Theatre group
- Purpose: Gujarati theatre
- Location: Mumbai

Gujarati Natak Mandali (1878–89) and its successor Mumbai Gujarati Natak Mandali (1889–1948) was a theatre company in Bombay, British India. It made immense contribution to the Gujarati theatre, with productions of more than hundred plays, as well as the training and introducing of many major actors and directors.

== History ==
=== Gujarati Natak Mandali (1878–89) ===
Gujarati theatre was established on the foundation of the Gujarati Natak Mandali. It was founded in response to discontent with the Parsi theatre company owner Framji Gustadji Dalal. The playwright Ranchhodbhai Dave, who had previously worked with Natak Uttejak Mandali (1875–94), helped in the starting and management of the new troupe, which initially started as an amateur group of Gujarati teachers. On 5 June 1878, three partners, Jayshankar Sarveshvar, Narottam Bhaichand, and Shivshankar Karasanji, co-founded the company, which later became known as Mehtajis' theatre company. Later they were joined by Manekram Dhirajram, Damodar Ratansi Somani, and Lalji Karsanji as new partners. The partners were responsible for various departments of the company. Sarveshvar was the manager and director of the company. The company pioneered the pure Gujarati culture-influenced theatre, free from any Parsi influences.

The company first produced Lalita Dukhdarshak (Lalita's Manifold Sufferings), a reformist play written and directed by Dave. It premiered on 6 January 1878 at the Victoria Theatre in front of an audience of 1200 people. It was the first social tragedy in the Gujarati language, with five acts and thirty-four scenes. It had twenty characters, including the character of Nandan, whose name became synonymous with a fool.

Dave wrote and directed the second play, Nal Damayanti (Nala and Damayanti), which also became successful. Other plays, Harishchandra, Madalsa ane Ritudhvaj (Madalsa and Ritudhvaj), and Banasur Madmardan (Taming of Banasur's Arrogance) were also produced by the company.

Chhotalal Mulchand Kapadia of Khambhat bought the Gujarati Natak Mandali with two other partners. Dayashankar Visanji Bhatt, a.k.a. Dayashankar Girnara, a theatre actor-director, renamed it the Mumbai Gujarati Natak Mandali and guided its further progress.

=== Rise and acclaim (1889–1922) ===
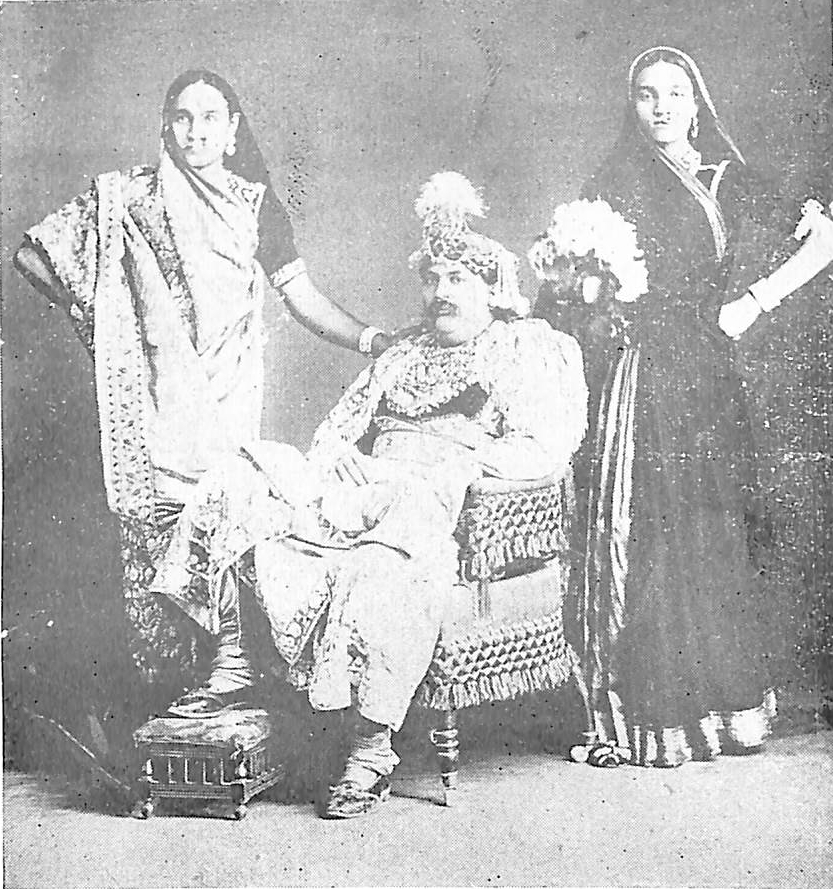
Jethalal Nayak, Dayashankar Vasanji and Jayshankar (Lakhwadwala) in Vikramcharit (1900) written by Mulani

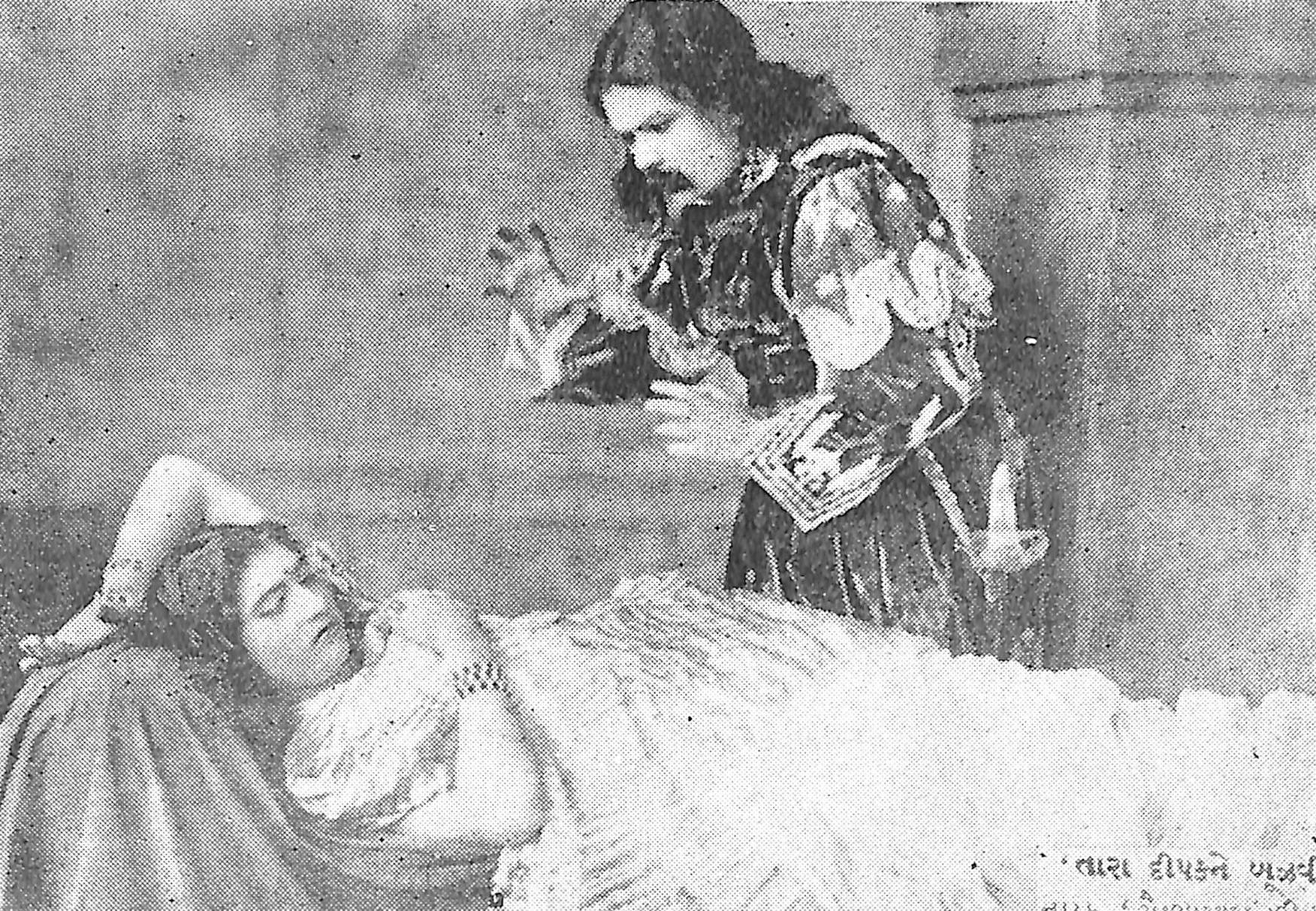
Bapulal Nayak and Jaishankar Sundari in Mulani's popular play Saubhagya Sundari (1901)

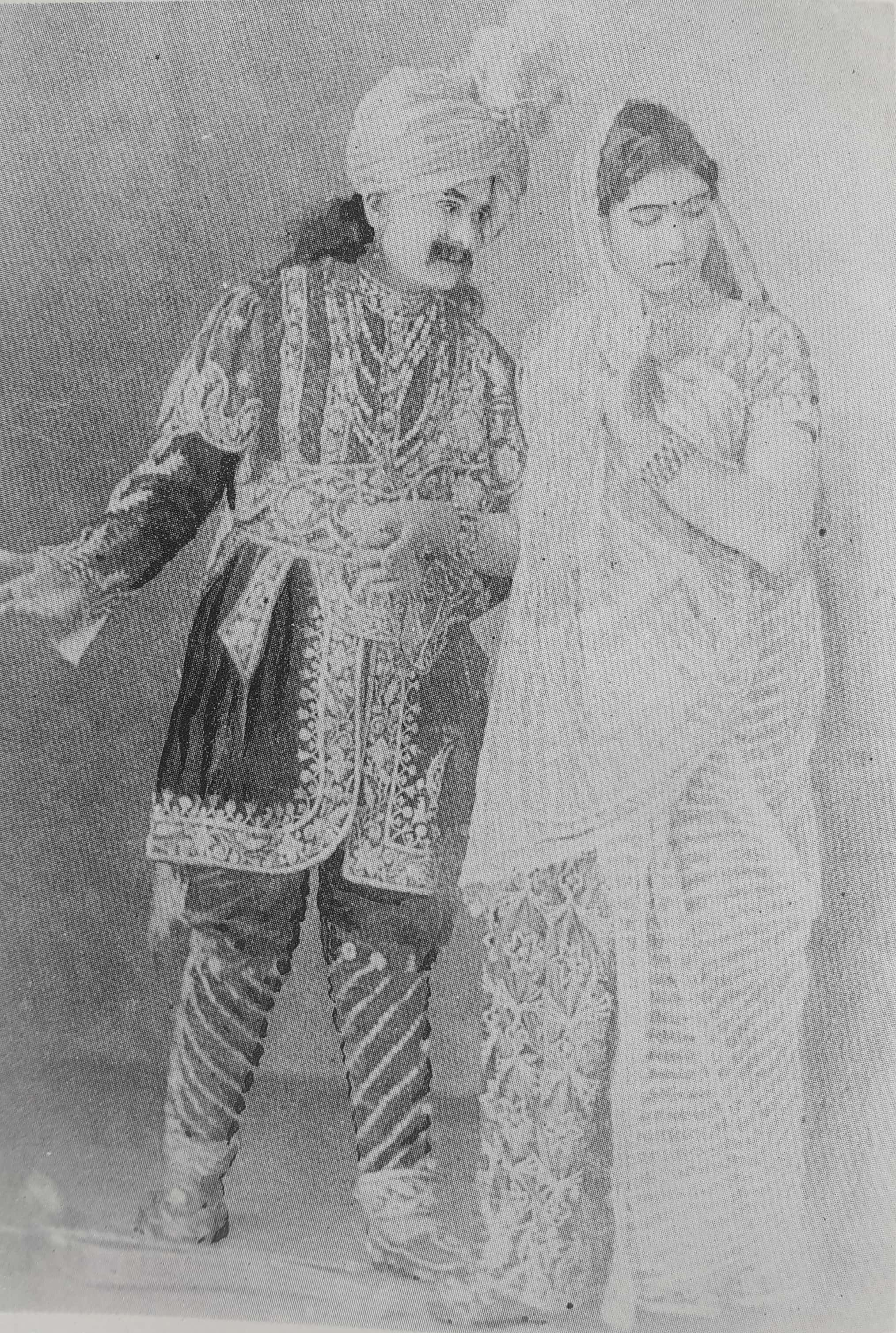
Bapulal Nayak (left) and Jaishankar Sundari in the play Kamlata, at Gaiety Theatre, Bombay, 1904

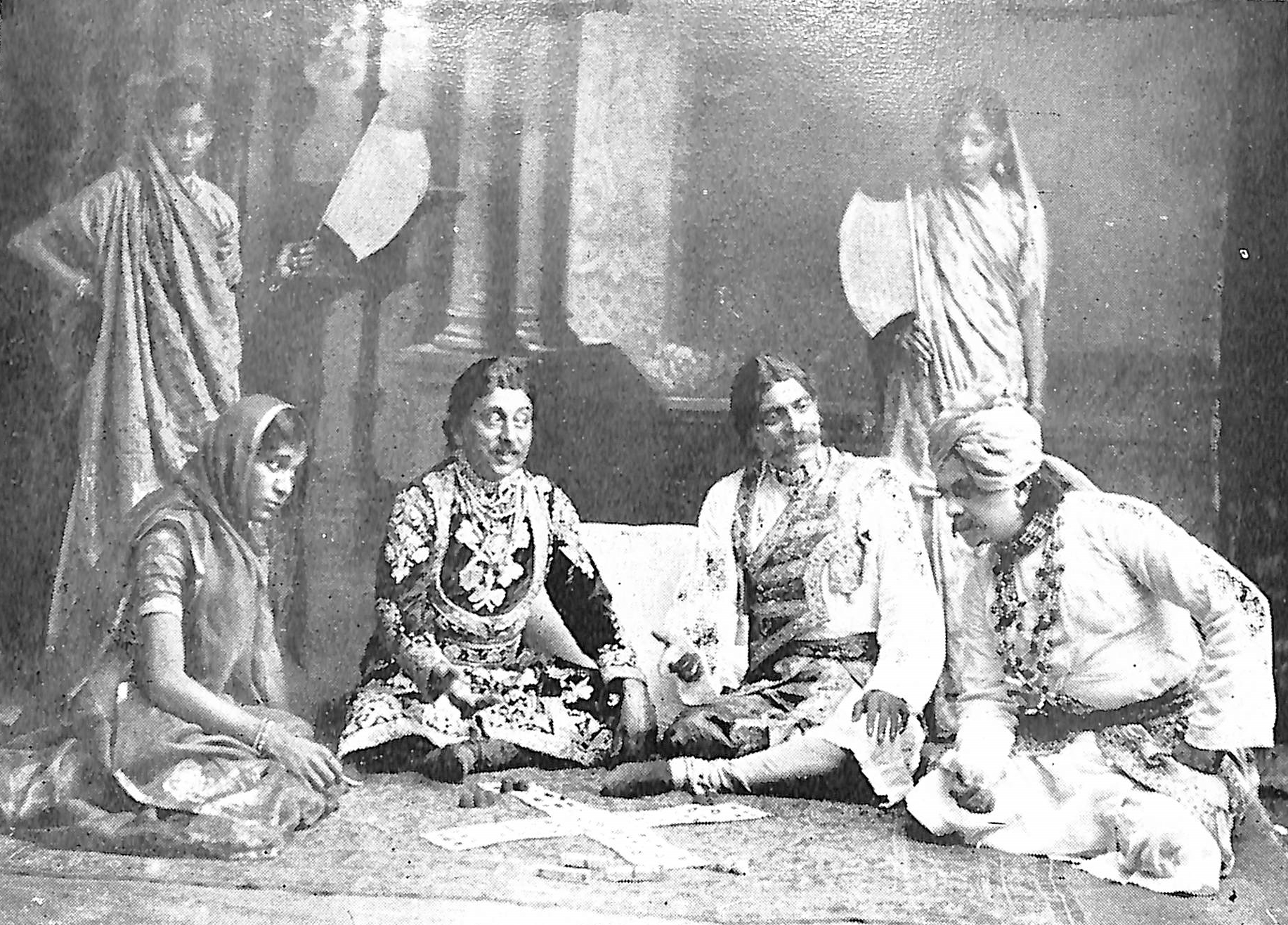
Bapulal Nayak, Dayashankar Oza and Mohan Marwadi in Nandbatrisi (1906) written by Mulani

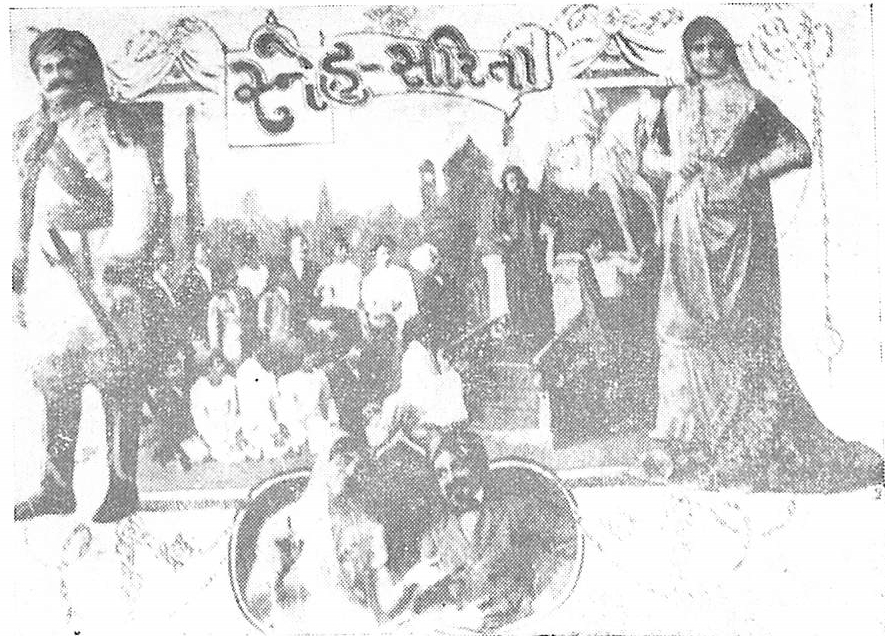
Advertisement of Sneh Sarita, a 1915 play

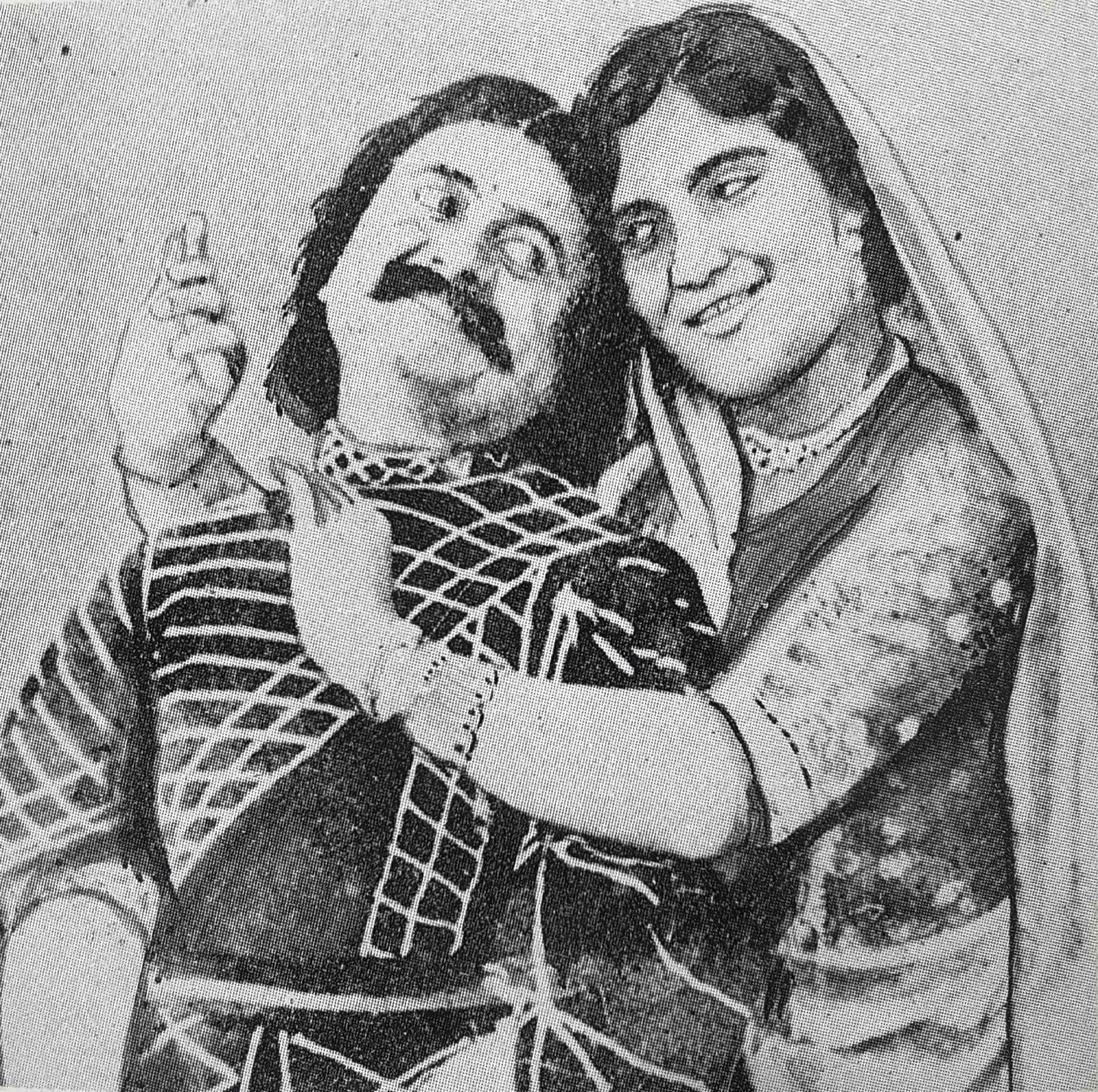
Bapulal Nayak (left) with Jaishankar Bhojak 'Sundari' in a play Sneh-Sarita in 1915. They acted in several successful plays together.

The new company was inaugurated on 29 June 1889 by Jhaverilal Umiyashankar Yajnik, the Sheriff of Bombay and native of Nadiad, with opening of the performance of Kulin Kanta or Vanrajvijay based on Manilal Nabhubhai Dwivedi's Kanta. It was directed by Girnara. Dwivedi saw the advertisement of performance and told Govardhanram Tripathi in Bombay to send him a legal notice for performing the play without his permission. Dayashankar went to Nadiad and met Dwivedi where he apologised, took him to Bombay, gave a diamond ring as well as requested him to write another play for rupees 400 to 500. Dwivedi did not accept the ring but agreed to write another play Nrusinhavatar for him. The new play was staged on 18 February 1899 but failed commercially because the director and lead actor were Parsis.

Under Girnara, the company excelled and brought many gifted actors and visionary directors as well as reputed playwrights, including some from literary circles. In the 1890s, Mulshankar Mulani was a major playwright who wrote several plays based on history and mythology. Bapulal Nayak was the leading actor of the company then.

Shankuntal (1889) and Rajbeej (King's Progeny, 1891) were successful productions. Kundbala (1892) depicted a relationship between a princely state and the British Raj. Following it, the censorship by the British authorities was instituted. It was followed by hit plays Mularaj Solanki (1895) and Karanghelo (1896, based on Nandshankar Mehta's Karanghelo). Barrister (1897) was about a youth who was devastated due to his attraction to the western world.

Bapulal Nayak was also involved in stage planning and the management of a theatre company. In 1899, he and Mulani became partners in the company, each holding a 6% share of the company.

Jayraj (1898) and Ajabkumari (1899) were not initially successful, due to the occurrence of a plague in Bombay. They became hits when they were performed again in 1912–13. Although the financial condition of the company had deteriorated, Vikramcharitra (1900), based on Shamal Bhatt's Sinhasan Batrisi, became a commercial hit and helped the company recover. Feeling hurt because of not receiving his previously agreed sum, Mulani left the company.

Mulani returned to the company and rewrote Saubhagya Sundari (1901), an adaptation of Shakespeare's Othello. The company introduced Jaishankar Bhojak, then aged 12, in 1901, who mainly performed as a female impersonator as females were not allowed in theatres in those times. He played the role of Desdemona as a female impersonator in Saubhagya Sundari, opposite Bapulal Nayak. The play was successful and Jayshankar received his sobriquet, Sundari ('pretty woman'), for the lifetime. The pair soon rose to fame and acted together in several successful plays including in Jugal Jugari (Jugal the Gambler, 1902), Kamlata (Lovestruck Girl, 1904), Madhu Bansari (Sweet Flute, 1917) and Sneh Sarita (River of Affection, 1915), Vikrama Charitra (Vikrama's Life, 1902), Dage Hasrat (1901). Their pair continued till 1932. Prabhashankar 'Ramani' acted in several plays and also rose to fame. The company also travelled Karachi in 1905-06 where they was attacked by goons as well as a rumour of abduction of Sundari was circulated.

Music director Vadilal Shivram Nayak composed scores of more than 500 songs in about forty plays. About hundred of these were published in Gujaratna Natak-Geetoni Sargam (Notations to Songs in Gujarati Plays, 1956).

Nayak wrote Nand-Batrisi (1906), Chandrabhaga (1909), a farce entitled Navalsha Hirji (1909), Anandlahari (1919) and Saubhagya-no Sinh (1925).

When Mulani's three plays failed consequently, the company chose to stage nationalistic plays written by Nrisinh Vibhakar. These plays experimented with story and themes as well as focused on contemporary subjects instead of taking inspirations from popular subjects such as mythology. But their enactment stayed unchanged. His Snehsarita (River of Affection, 1915) had a lead character of a woman participating in the Indian independence movement. His another Sudhachandra (Sudha and Chandra, 1915) focused on swaraj (self-rule) and Madhubansari (Sweet Flute, 1917) focused on home-rule movement. Madhubansari ran successfully for two years due to great direction, fine acting and music. The Gaiety Theatre — now Capitol Cinema — owned by the company from 1893, was filled with spectators for these plays.

=== Decline (1922–1939) ===
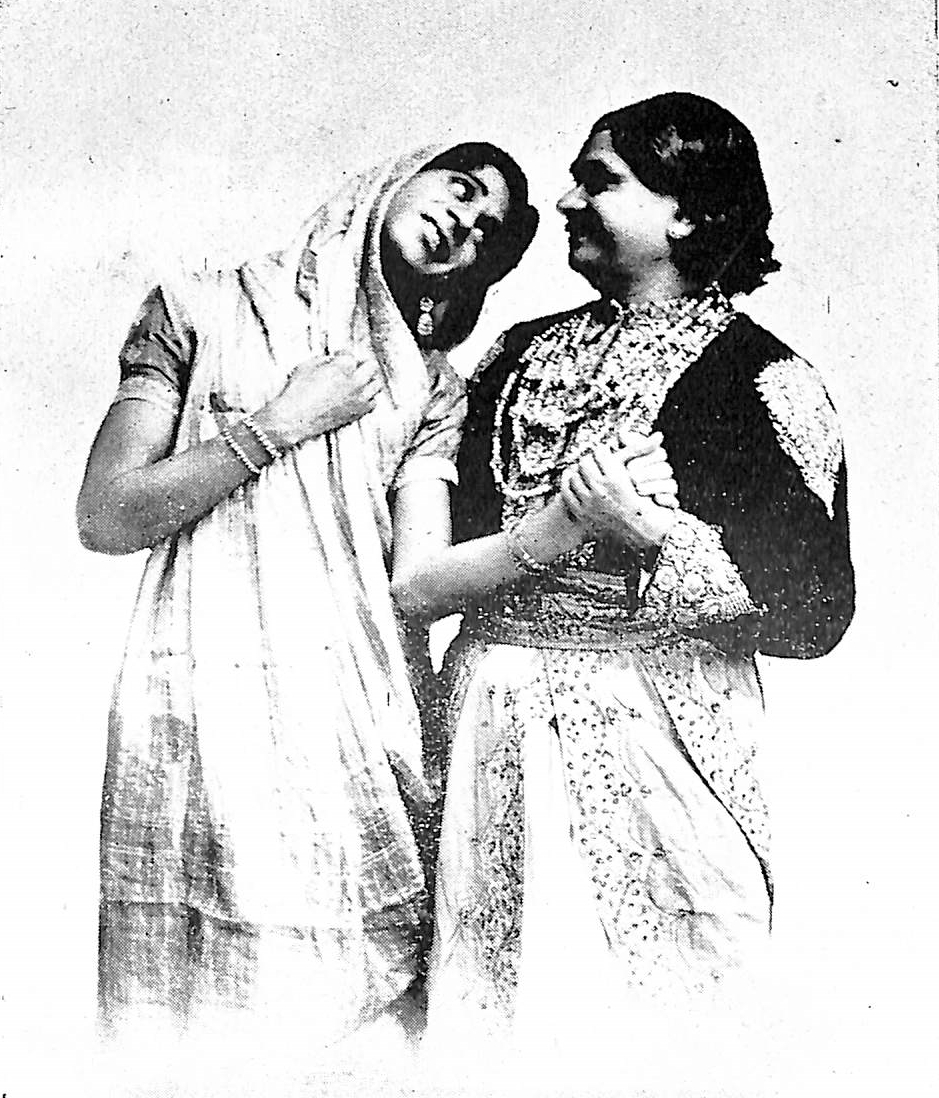
Bapulal Nayak and Mohan Marwadi in Mulani's Vasantprabha, 1922

Bapulal Nayak acquired the company in April 1922. He started directing his plays and started adapting literature into plays. He produced Ramanbhai Neelkanth's play Raino Parvat (Mustard-seed to Mountain) in 1926. The songs of the play were written by Rasiklal Parikh and four shows of it were staged. Later he staged four plays written by Champshi Udeshi, four plays written by Gajendrashankar Pandya as well as many Parsi theatre styled plays. Gajendrashankar Pandya's play College Kanya (College Girl, 1925) starred popular actors Pransukh Nayak and Chhagan Romeo as comedians and it created controversy due to some of its dialogue about females; Narsinhrao Divetia, Chandravadan Mehta and Hansa Jivraj Mehta led the public protests against the play.

The company suffered due to internal squabbling and jealousy. Mulani had left the company. After death of Dayashankar Girnara, Sorabji Katrak was brought in as a new director. Bapulal highlighted his directorial mistakes so the owners of the company established a separate Mumbai Urdu Natak Mandali which was closed down after a year and Katrak had to leave. The owner Maganlal and Chhotalal were focused on profits only. Bapulal wanted to be a director and writer so he played a major role in outing others. Jaishankar Sundari too left the company and joined Laxmikant Natak Samaj for a brief period before returning to the company. After sometime, he retired from the theatre in 1932. p. 19 Mulani also retired in 1932. Nepolean (1937), written by Manilal Pagal, was premiered in Sayaji Theatre in Baroda.

Many poor quality plays produced only for profits led to their failure. The high salaried actors, costly productions and failure of plays led to the loss. With the advent of the cinema, the theatre started to lose its audience. The company was sold in 1938 and was closed on 30 November 1939.

=== Last years (1944–1948) ===
M/s Shantilal and Co. financed the company and Bapulal briefly ran it from 1944 to 1945 before his retirement in 1946. In 1948, Chandrahas Manilal Jhaveri ran it for some time and renamed it to Mumbai Subodh Natak Mandali before it became defunct.

== List of plays ==
Following is the list of plays produced by the Mumbai Gujarati Natak Mandali:

| Date | Title | Writer | Notes |
|---|---|---|---|
Mumbai Gujarati Natak Mandali under Chhotalal Mulchand Kapadia
| 29 June 1889 | Kulin Kanta or Vanrajvijay | Mulshankar Mulani (adaptation) | Adaptation of Manilal Dwivedi's Kanta |
| 10 August 1889 | Shakuntal | Mulshankar Mulani | Adaptation of Annasaheb Kirloskar's Shakuntal |
| 4 January 1890 | Kanaktara | Popat Prabhuram Vyas | |
| 9 August 1890 | Harishchandra | Vishwanath Prabhuram Vaidya | |
| 21 January 1891 | Rajbeej | Mulshankar Mulani | |
| 27 February 1892 | Kundabala | Mulshankar Mulani | |
| 15 August 1892 | Rasikmani | Narabheshankar Manchharam Vyas | |
| 17 December 1892 | Nal Damayanti | Ranchhodbhai Dave | |
| 8 July 1893 | Mansinh Abhaysinh | Mulshankar Mulani | |
| 2 December 1893 | Sundar Veni | – | |
| 30 June 1894 | Chanda | | |
| 3 November 1894 | Premkala | Vijayshankar Kalidas Bhatt | |
| 14 January 1895 | Dukhi Bhai Bahen | | |
| 27 April 1895 | Mevadno Pratapi Chand | Vijayshankar Kalidas Bhatt | |
| 20 July 1895 | Lalita Dukhdarshak | Ranchhodbhai Dave | |
| 19 October 1895 | Mularaj Solanki | Mulshankar Mulani / Vijayshankar Kalidas Bhatt | |
| 5 September 1896 | Karanghelo | Mulshankar Mulani | Adaptation of Nandshankar Mehta's novel Karanghelo |
| 4 August 1897 | Barrister | Mulshankar Mulani | |
| 8 January 1898 | Ramcharitra | Vijayshankar Kalidas Bhatt | |
| 8 March 1898 | Lakshadhipatino Raman | | one-act play |
| 23 April 1898 | Pushpasen Pushpavati | – | |
| 27 August 1898 | Jayraj | Mulshankar Mulani | |
| 18 February 1899 | Nrusinhavatar | Manilal Dwivedi | |
| 18 July 1899 | Tilakkumar | Vijayshankar Kalidas Bhatt | |
| 30 September 1899 | Ajabkumari | Mulshankar Mulani | |
| 16 December 1899 | Veer Mandal | Mulshankar Mulani | |
| 7 February 1900 | Mohini | Vijayshankar Kalidas Bhatt | |
| 7 July 1900 | Vikramcharitra | Mulshankar Mulani | based on Shamal Bhatt's Sinhasan Batrisi |
| 19 October 1901 | Saubhagya Sundari | Mulshankar Mulani | |
| 26 August 1902 | Jugal Jugari | Mulshankar Mulani | |
| 18 October 1904 | Kamlata | Mulshankar Mulani | Loosely based on Shakuntal |
| 1906 | Nandbatrisi | Bapulal Nayak / Mulshankar Mulani | Based on Shamal Bhatt's Nandbatrisi |
| 1908 | Sangatno Rang | – | |
| 22 May 1909 | Chandrabhaga | Bapulal Nayak | |
| 3 November 1909 | Navalsha Heerji | Mulshankar Mulani | |
| 17 December 1910 | Vasantprabha | Mulshankar Mulani | |
| 1911 | Devkanya | Mulshankar Mulani | |
| 1912 | Krishnacharitra | Mulshankar Mulani | Inspired from stories from Bhagavata |
| 31 January 1914 | Prataplakshmi | Mulshankar Mulani | Based on Manilal Dwivedi's novel Gulabsinh |
| 28 February 1915 | Sangatna Fal | Mulshankar Mulani | |
| 19 September 1915 | Sneh Sarita | Nrisinh Vibhakar | |
| 5 August 1916 | Sudhachandra | Nrisinh Vibhakar | |
| 28 July 1917 | Madhubansari | Nrisinh Vibhakar | |
| 23 November 1918 | Meghmalini | Nrisinh Vibhakar | |
| 23 August 1919 | Anandlahari | Bapulal Nayak | |
| 25 September 1920 | Vishwaleela | Ambashankar Harishankar Upadhyay | |
Mumbai Gujarati Natak Mandali under Bapulal Nayak
| 25 April 1925 | Saubhagyano Sinh | Bapulal Nayak | |
| 1926 | Madandh Mahila Yane Noorjahan | Jayshankar Vaghajibhai Vyas | |
| 1926 | Kumali Kali | Shayda | |
| 1926 | Raino Parvat | Ramanbhai Nilkanth | |
| 1927 | Jamanano Rang | Gajendrashankar Lalshankar Pandya | |
| 1928 | Tarunina Tarang | Gajendrashankar Lalshankar Pandya | |
| 1928 | Kashmirnu Prabhat | Gajendrashankar Lalshankar Pandya | |
| 21 February 1929 | Kudaratno Nyay | Gajendrashankar Lalshankar Pandya | |
| 29 March 1929 | Up-to-date Mavali | Joseph David | |
| 1929 | Swamibhakti Yane Baji Deshpande (Hindi) | Munshi Mohiyuddin Naza | |
| 27 January 1929 | Kimiyagar | 'Manasvi' Prantijwala (rewritten) | |
| 9 January 1930 | Kuldeepak | Gajendrashankar Lalshankar Pandya | |
| October 1930 | Bapna Bol | Chimanlal Trivedi | |
| January 1931 | Kutil Rajneeti | Gajendrashankar Lalshankar Pandya | |
| 23 January 1932 | Karmasanjog | Mugatlal Pranjeevan Oza | |
| 1932 | Karyasiddhi (Hindi) | 'Manasvi' Prantijwala (adaptation) | |
| 1933 | Gentleman Daku | Joseph David | |
| 1933 | Rannsamragni | | |
| 9 September 1933 | Kon Samrat? | 'Manasvi' Prantijwala (rewritten) | |
| 20 October 1933 | Kanchankumari | | |
| 1934 | Koni Mahatta? | Manilal 'Pagal' | |
| 1934 | Kirtivijay | 'Manasvi' Prantijwala | |
| 13 September 1934 | Jeenjarna Zankare | Champshi Udeshi | |
| 7 January 1935 | Sachcha Heera (Urdu) | Munshi Mohiyuddin Naza (adaptation) | |
| 20 March 1935 | Mumbaini Badi | Joseph David | |
| 1 June 1935 | Gheli Guniyal | Champshi Udeshi | |
| 3 August 1935 | Kevo Badmas? | Joseph David | |
| January 1936 | Kiritkumar | Manilal 'Pagal' | |
| February 1936 | Nepolean | Manilal 'Pagal' | |
| 30 July 1936 | Jobanna Jadu | Manilal 'Pagal' | |
| 15 May 1937 | Shataranjna Dav | Champshi Udeshi | |
| 7 August 1937 | Gareebna Ansu | Champshi Udeshi | |
| December 1937 | Sinhasanna Shokh | Babubhai Kalyanji Oza | |
| 5 February 1938 | Shrimant Ke Shaitan? | Babubhai Kalyanji Oza | |
| 1938 | Samarprabha | Gajendrashankar Lalshankar Pandya | |
| 4 August 1938 | Komi Nishan (Urdu) | | |
| 23 September 1938 | Nyayi Naresh | Manilal 'Pagal' | |
| 20 October 1938 | Cinema ni Sundari | Babubhai Kalyanji Oza | |
| 19 November 1938 | Sukhi Sansar | Champshi Udeshi | |
| 7 December 1938 | Rajadhiraj | Chimanlal Trivedi | |
| 11 March 1939 | Kalankit Kon? | Chimanlal Trivedi | |
| 26 July 1939 | Kartavyapanthe? | G. A. Vairati | |
| 5 September 1939 | Khavindne Khatar | Pherozegar | |
Mumbai Gujarati Natak Mandali under Mohanlal M. Jhaveri
| 25 April 1944 | Garbhasanskar | Babulal Kalyanji Oza | |
| 26 October 1944 | Parambhakta Prahlad | Babulal Kalyanji Oza | |
| 20 January 1945 | Lakshmina Lobhe | Manilal 'Pagal' | |
| 14 June 1945 | Aajni Duniya | Champshi Udeshi | |
| 6 December 1945 | Narihriday | Shayda | |
| 25 April 1945 | Garbhashrimant | Babulal Kalyanji Oza | |
| 31 August 1946 | Aapnu Ghar | Vasant Hathiram Nayak | |
Mumbai Gujarati Natak Mandali under Chandrahas M. Jhaveri
| 9 September 1948 | Hastamelap | Ambalal Manchand Nayak 'Pandit' | |
| 6 November 1948 | Kariyavar | G. A. Vairati | |
| 28 May 1949 | Varkanya | Hemubhai Bhatt | |
| 1 October 1949 | Kulalakshmi | | |
