= Mulshankar Mulani =

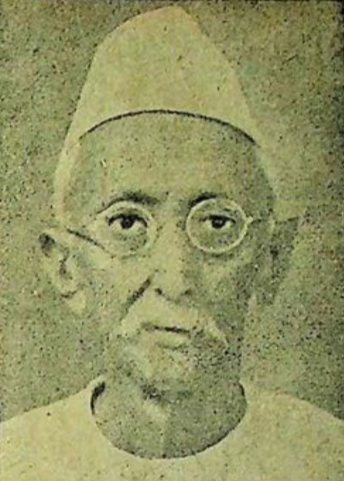
- In November 1956 issue of Gujarati Natya magazine
- Born: 1 November 1867; Chavand, British India
- Died: 14 December 1957 (aged 90)
- Occupations: Playwright, editor
- Years active: 1889–1915
- Notable work: Ajabkumari (1899, 1912); Saubhagya Sundari (1901); Nandbatrisi (1906); Krishnacharitra (1906)
- Parents: Harinand (father); Mankunwar (mother)

Mulshankar Harinand Mulani (1 November 1867 – 14 December 1957) was a Gujarati playwright from the Gujarati theatre of India. After working as a village development officer and as an editor with a weekly newspaper, he joined the Mumbai Gujarati Natak Mandali, a theatre company, where he worked as a playwright for decades. He wrote more than fifty plays on social, mythological and historical subjects including commercially or critically successful plays like Rajbeej (1891), Ajabkumari (1899, 1912), Saubhagya Sundari (1901), Nandbatrisi (1906) and Krishnacharitra (1906).

== Early life ==
He was born on 1 November 1867 in Chavand (now in Amreli district, Gujarat, India) to the religious Prashnora Nagar Brahmin family of Harinand Dayanad and Mankunwar. He was a descendant of Mula Bhatt who had served as a minister of Nawanagar State before 10 or 12 generations. He studied until the fourth standard in English medium in Junagadh and had read religious works and Sanskrit books at his home, later going on to study with a Sanskrit scholar for some time.

Mulani started a job as a village development officer in Dhari, for a salary of ten rupees, but subsequently left to go to Bombay (now Mumbai). After a period of struggles, he joined a weekly Satyavakta as a proofreader for a salary of twenty rupees. He covered true stories in his column, Ghanghata and became popular. Later he served as an editor of the weekly.

== Theatre career ==
Mulani met Prabhurai Popatlal, who offered him a job as a play editor in the Mumbai Gujarati Natak Mandali, a theatre company, for a salary of five rupees. He transcribed copies of the plays also. Eventually, he left the Satyavakta and his salary rose to thirty rupees. His first play Shakuntal (1889) and his second play Rajbeej (1891) starring Bapulal Nayak were performed in the Geity Theatre and were commercially successful. It was followed by Kundbala (1892) and Mansinh Abhaysinh (1893). Kundbala depicted a relationship between a princely state and the British Raj. Following it, the censorship by the British authorities was instituted. His health deteriorated and he returned to his native village where he wrote his successful plays, Mularaj Solanki (1895) and Karanghelo (1896, based on Nandshankar Mehta's Karanghelo). His salary rose to 35 rupees. After studying Shakespeare and Kalidasa, he wrote Barrister (1897), which was a play about a youth who was devastated due to his attraction to the western world. It became successful and his salary rose to 75 rupees. Later he was made a partner in the company.

Mulani introduced tragedy to the Gujarati theatre. His Jayraj (1898) and Ajabkumari (1899) were not initially successful, due to the occurrence of plague in Bombay. They however, became hits when they were performed again in 1912–13. Ajabkumari was praised by scholars like Govardhanram Tripathi but the audience did not like it. Although the financial condition of the company had deteriorated, his Vikramcharitra (1900), based on Shamal Bhatt's Sinhasan Batrisi, became a commercial hit and helped the company recover. He demanded his pending sum of 28,000 rupees with the company, but received only 10,000 rupees. Feeling hurt, he left the company. His contract terms, however, prohibited him from writing plays for other companies for another ten years. He subsequently founded the Kathiyawadi Natak Mandali in 1906 in the name of his son-in-law, Vishwanath Madhavji Bhatt. Viththaldas Bhojak and Bapulal Punjiram Nayak were its director and musician respectively.

He rejoined Mumbai Gujarati Natak Mandali when Nathuram Shukla requested him to rewrite Saubhagyasundari, which had failed to impress the owners and the director of the company. He rewrote the play and it premiered on 19 October 1901. Starring Bapulal Nayak and Jaishankar Bhojak in lead roles as well as Mohanlala in the role of Madhav, the play became a major success and Jaishankar became known for his female impersonator role of Sundari. The pairing of Bapulal Nayak and Jaishankar Sundari became popular with the audience and they starred together in many plays later on. Prabhashankar 'Ramani' acted in his several plays and rose to fame. Jugal Jugari (1902) was his social play.

Kathiyawadi Natak Mandali produced his Krishnacharitra (1906) which brought Krishna, for the first time, on the Gujarati stage. Devotional in nature, it was based on stories from the Bhagavata, depicting the relationship between Krishna and Gopi. His plays influenced Urdu as well as Marathi plays. He had written Veermandal in just a day. In addition, he had written scripts for films. In debt in 1909, he sold Kathiyawadi Natak Mandali, and in 1915, he left the Mumbai Gujarati Natak Mandali. His Ek Ja Bhool (1919), written for Royal Natak Mandali, had a discussion on a drone in its script. In 1920s, he worked with Aryasubodh Gujarati Natak Mandali.

After retirement, he lived in Kanpur and Bhavnagar. He died on 14 December 1957.

== Works ==
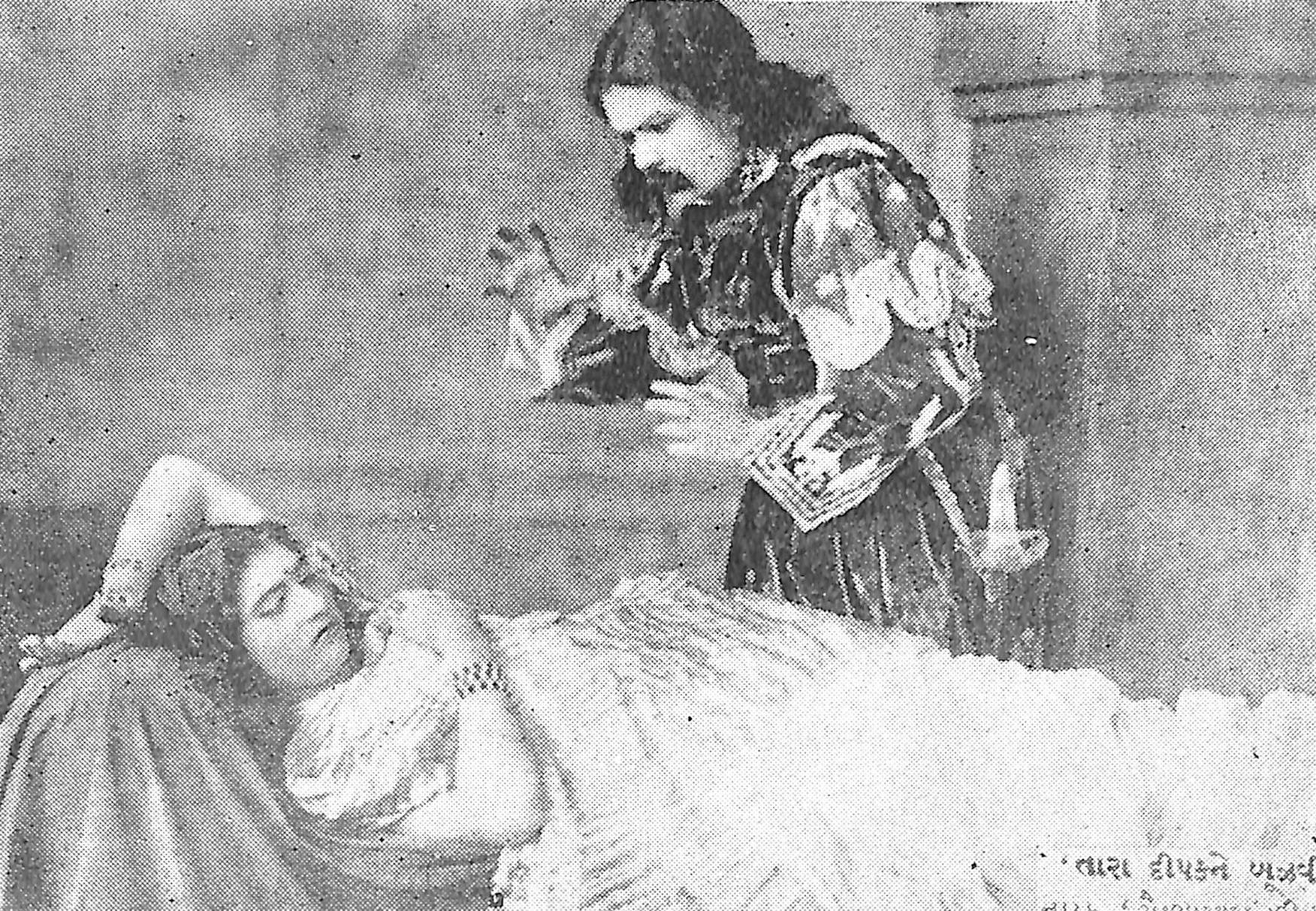
Bapulal Nayak and Jaishankar Sundari in Mulani's popular play Saubhagya Sundari (1901)

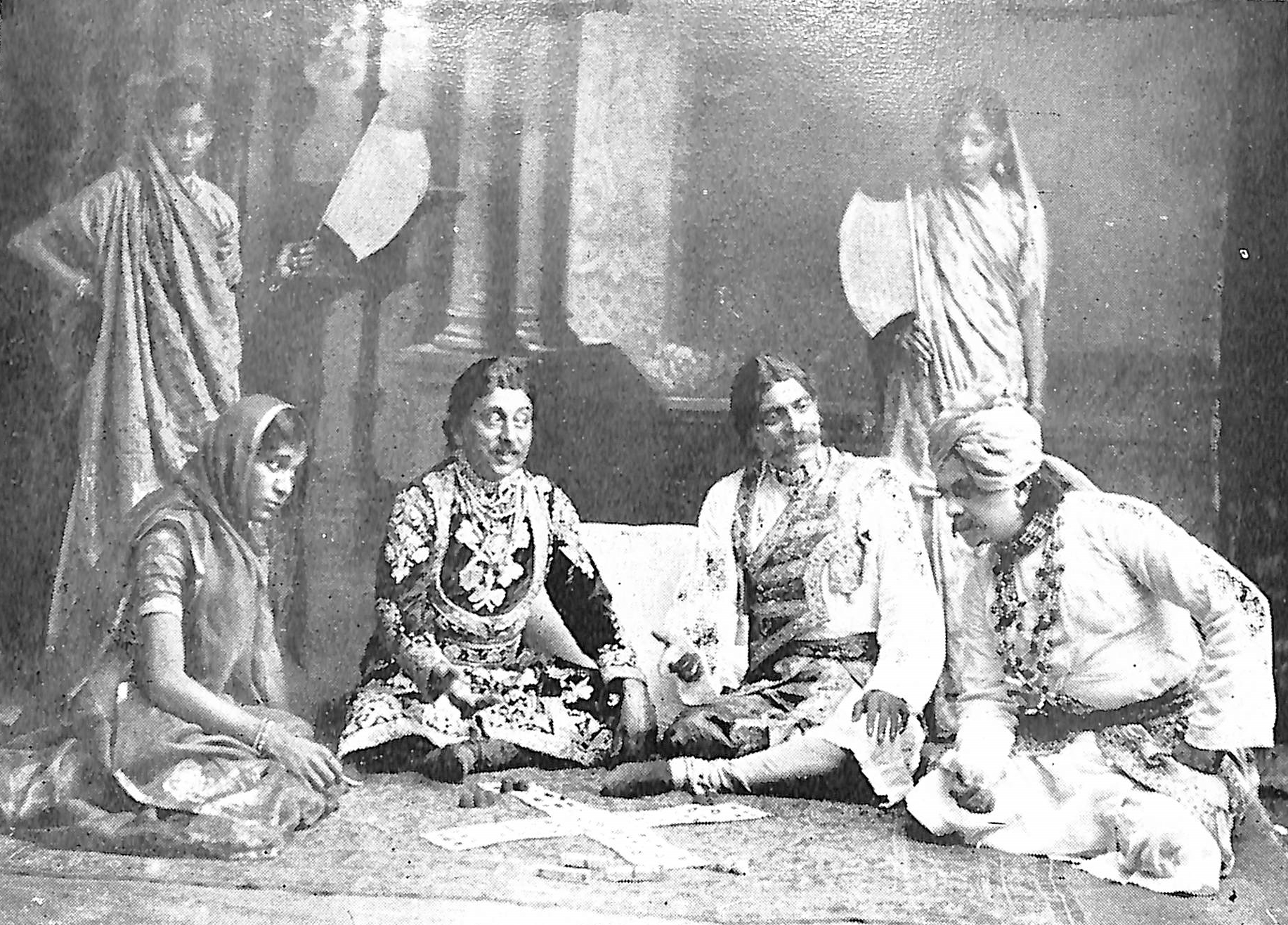
Bapulal Nayak, Dayashankar Oza and Mohan Marwadi in Nandbatrisi (1906) written by Mulani

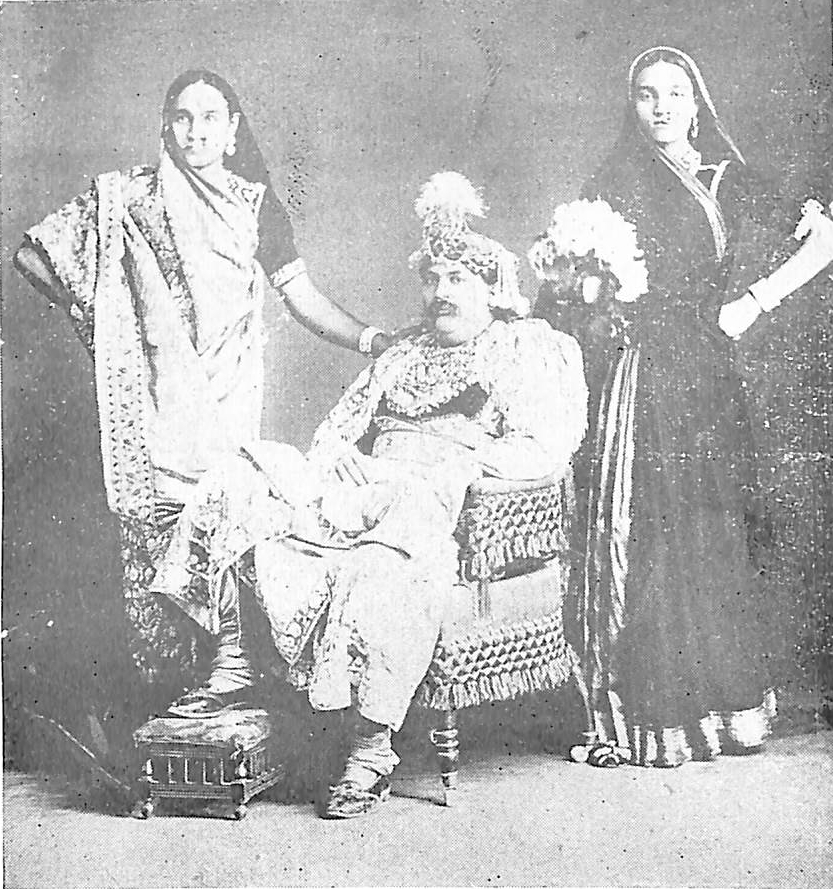
Jethalal Nayak, Dayashankar Vasanji and Jayshankar (Lakhwadwala) in Vikramcharit (1900) written by Mulani

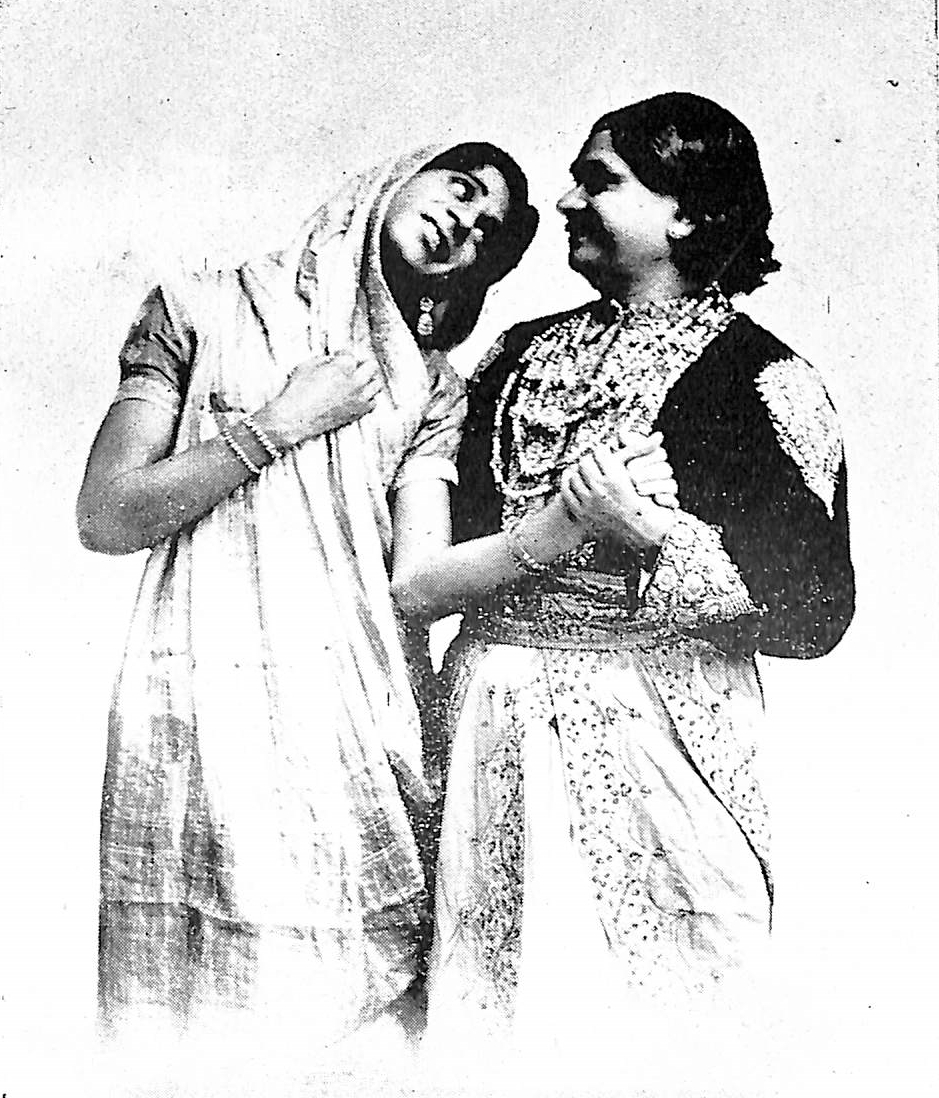
Bapulal Nayak and Mohan Marwadi in Mulani's Vasantprabha, 1922

Mulani was one of the prominent playwrights of the old Gujarati theatre. He had written more than fifty plays on social, mythological and historical subjects; about twenty eight staged, four not staged and fourteen adapted plays. His popular plays include Rajbeej (1891), Ajabkumari (1899, 1912), Saubhagyasundari (1901), Nandbatrisi (1906) and Krishnacharitra (1906). Krishnacharitra and Devkanya are published as books. His Porus Sikandar is published but never performed on the stage.

He wrote and composed songs for musical plays with help of his knowledge of folk-tunes and metres before writing plays. His songs for Kulin Kanta became popular.

His plays depict the most noticeable features of old Gujarati theatre, including the technique of setting, music and acting, and the theme of triumph of good over evil was central in his plays. He drew inspiration from historical or mythological episodes and wove it in the contemporary events. His plays also focused on the conflicts arising from the human relations.

28 staged plays
Play	Date	Theatre company	Notes
Shakuntal	10 August 1889	Mumbai Gujarati Natak Mandali	Adapted from Annasaheb Kirloskar's Marathi play Shakuntal
Rajbeej	21 February 1891	Mumbai Gujarati Natak Mandali	
Kundabala	27 February 1892	Mumbai Gujarati Natak Mandali	
Mansinh Abhaysinh	8 July 1893	Mumbai Gujarati Natak Mandali	
Mularaj Solanki	19 October 1895	Mumbai Gujarati Natak Mandali	
Karanghelo	5 September 1896	Mumbai Gujarati Natak Mandali	Based on Nandshankar Mehta's novel Karanghelo
Barrister	14 August 1897	Mumbai Gujarati Natak Mandali	
Jayraj	27 August 1898	Mumbai Gujarati Natak Mandali	
Ajabkumari	30 September 1899	Mumbai Gujarati Natak Mandali	
Veermandal	16 December 1899	Mumbai Gujarati Natak Mandali	
Vikramcharitra	7 July 1900	Mumbai Gujarati Natak Mandali	Based on Shamal Bhatt's Sinhasan Batrisi
Saubhagya Sundari	19 October 1901	Mumbai Gujarati Natak Mandali	
Jugal Jugari	23 August 1902	Mumbai Gujarati Natak Mandali	
Kamlata	14 October 1904	Mumbai Gujarati Natak Mandali	Loosely based on Shakuntal
Krishnacharitra	1906	Kathiyawadi Natak Mandali	Inspired from stories from Bhagavata
Krishnacharitra	1912	Mumbai Gujarati Natak Mandali	Inspired from stories from Bhagavata
Nandbatrisi	1906	Mumbai Gujarati Natak Mandali	Based on Shamal Bhatt's Nandbatrisi
Chaitanyakumar	1908	Kathiyawadi Natak Mandali	Based on story by Harilal Mulshankar Mulani
Devkanya	1908	Kathiyawadi Natak Mandali	
Devkanya	1911	Mumbai Gujarati Natak Mandali	
Navalsha Heerji	3 November 1909	Mumbai Gujarati Natak Mandali	
Vasantprabha	17 December 1910	Mumbai Gujarati Natak Mandali	
Prataplakshmi	31 January 1914	Mumbai Gujarati Natak Mandali	Based on Manilal Dwivedi's novel Gulabsinh
Sangatna Fal	28 February 1915	Mumbai Gujarati Natak Mandali	
Ek Ja Bhool	1919	Royal Natak Mandali	
Bhagyoday	1920	Royal Natak Mandali	
Ratnavali	28 February 1925	Aryasubodh Gujarati Natak Mandali	
Vikram Ane Shani	28 May 1925	Aryasubodh Gujarati Natak Mandali	Based on Shamal Bhatt's Sinhasan Batrisi
Veernari Asha	3 October 1925	Aryasubodh Gujarati Natak Mandali	
Kokila	1926	Aryasubodh Gujarati Natak Mandali	

== Recognition ==
He was felicitated by the Bhavnagar Sahitya Sabha in 1944 and the Gujarat Sahitya Sabha in 1946 in Ahmedabad during the Rang Parishad, a theatre conference session. He was honoured in Bhangwadi Theatre, Bombay on 14 December 1948 and was awarded rupees 1,50,000.

Jaishankar Bhojak 'Sundari' had considered him the Shakespeare of Gujarat. Dinesh H. Bhatt has written a doctoral thesis on his life and works in 1966.

== See also ==
- List of Gujarati-language writers
