= Saubhagya Sundari =

Gujarati play written by Nathuram Shukla

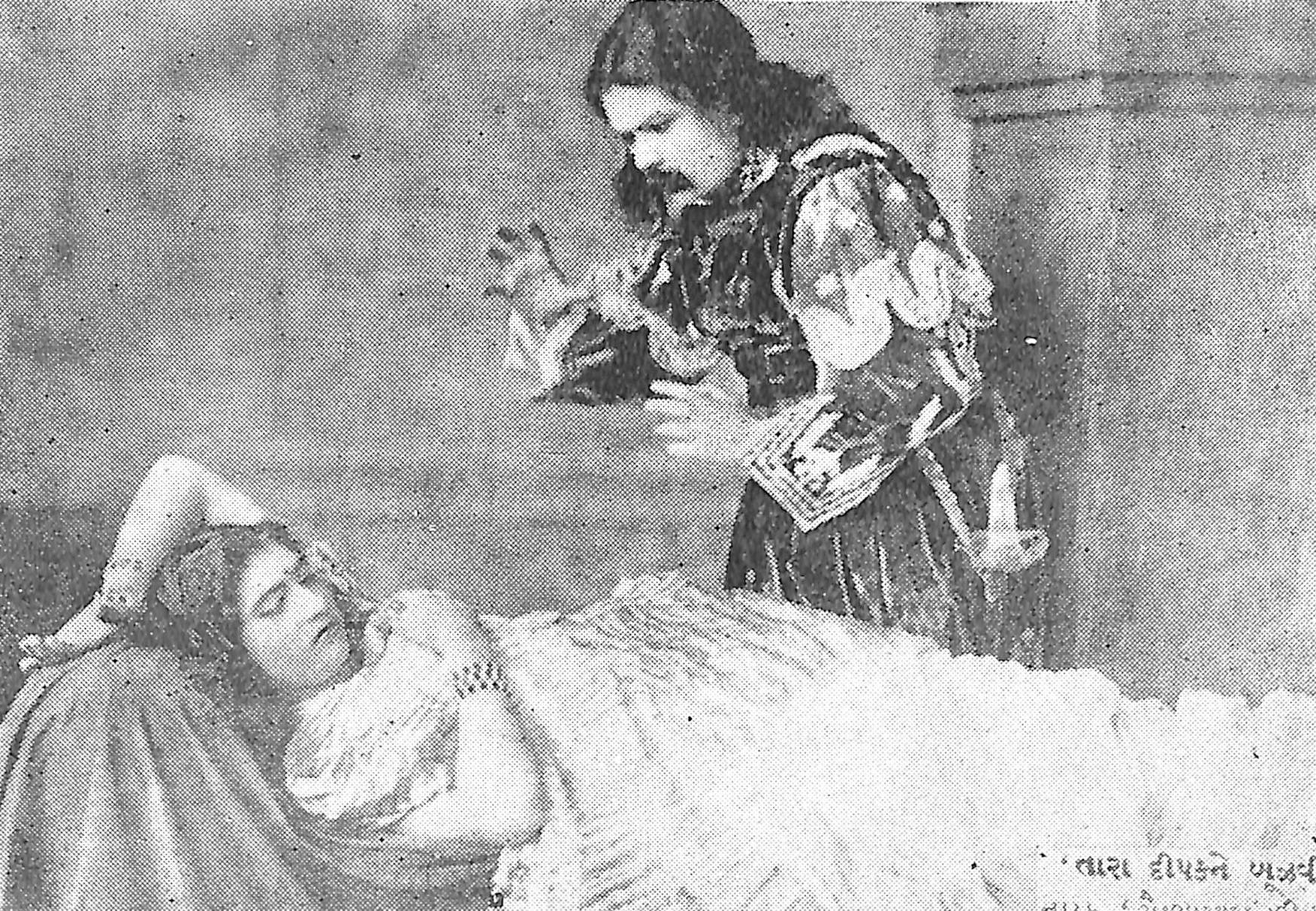
- Bapulal Nayak as Saubhagyasinh and Jaishankar Bhojak as Sundari in Saubhagyasundari, 1901
- Written by: Mulshankar Mulani and Nathuram Shukla
- Characters: Saubhagyasinh; Sundari; Madhavsinh; Sundarsen; Kumati
- Original language: Gujarati

Premiere
- Date premiered: 19 October 1901
- Place premiered: Gaiety Theatre, Mumbai

Saubhagya Sundari (pronounced [sɒʊb'hɑːɡj sʊndʌriː]) is a Gujarati play, originally written by Nathuram Shukla and then rewritten by Mulshankar Mulani. It starred Bapulal Nayak and Jaishankar Bhojak in lead roles, the later started his acting career with this play in Gujarati theatre. It was produced by Mumbai Gujarati Natak Mandali in 1901.

== History ==
The play was originally written by Nathuram Sundarji Shukla, a Gujarati poet. On the request of Mumbai Gujarati Natak Mandali, it was rewritten by Mulshankar Mulani. Mulani majorly modified all the aspects of this play like prose, poetry, major events, characterization, style etc. Thus, generally Mulani is regarded as the author of the play. The play was first performed at Gaiety Theatre on 19 October 1901. The play is influenced by William Shakespeare's Othello.

The play was published as a book in Gujarati titled Saubhagyasundari ane Bija Natakonu Navneet, in 1951 by Sastu Sahityavardhak Karyalay, Ahmedabad.

== Plot ==
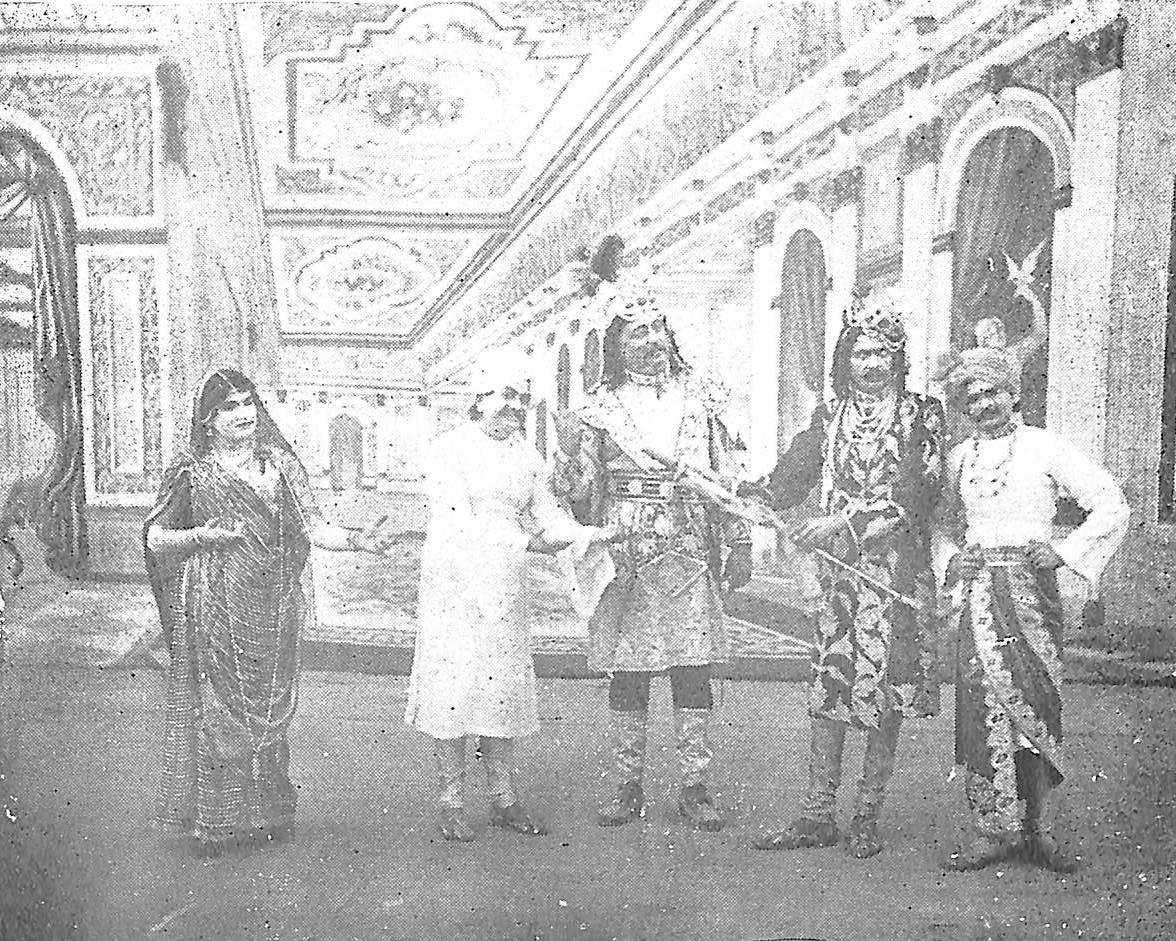
From left Surajram Nayak, Bapulal Nayak, Jatashankar Oza, Vaghji Barot and Manilal Kastur in Saubhagya Sundari, 1923

Saubhagyasinh is the son of king Chatursinh of Durgeshnagar, who was lost in a river. Sundari is the daughter of Sundarsen. Once, in a garden, Saubhagyasinh saves Sundari from a madly rushing elephant, and they fall in love with each other. Kumati, a step-mother of Sundari, raises obstacles in their marriage. Madhavsinh, friend of Saubhagyasinh, helps them and arranges their marriage.

== Legacy ==
Jaishankar Bhojak's role as Sundari became very popular, and he earned his sobriquet, Sundari ('pretty woman'), for the lifetime. The play was adapted into the 1933 Indian silent film Saubhagya Sundari directed by Homi Master, starring Dinshaw Bilimoria and Jillo.
