= Detroj railway station =

Railway station in Gujarat, India

Detroj

General information
- Location: Detroj, Gujarat; India
- Coordinates: 23.3403962°N 72.1844170°E
- Elevation: 51 metres (167 ft)
- System: Indian Railways station
- Owner: Ministry of Railways, Indian Railways
- Operator: Western Railway
- Line: Viramgam–Mahesana section
- Platforms: 1
- Tracks: 3

Construction
- Structure type: Standard (on ground)
- Parking: Yes

Other information
- Status: Functioning
- Station code: DTJ
- Zone(s): Western Railway
- Division(s): Ahmedabad

History
- Opened: 1908
- Rebuilt: 2004
Location
- Location within India Location within Gujarat

Detroj railway station is a railway station in Ahmedabad district, Gujarat, India on the Western line of the Western railway network. Detroj railway station is 29 km far away from Viramgam Junction. Passenger trains halt here.

Detroj has a car-stacking facility that serves a nearby Maruti Suzuki India factory.
