= Jaishankar Bhojak =

Indian actor and director (1889–1975)

Jaishankar Bhojak 'Sundari'
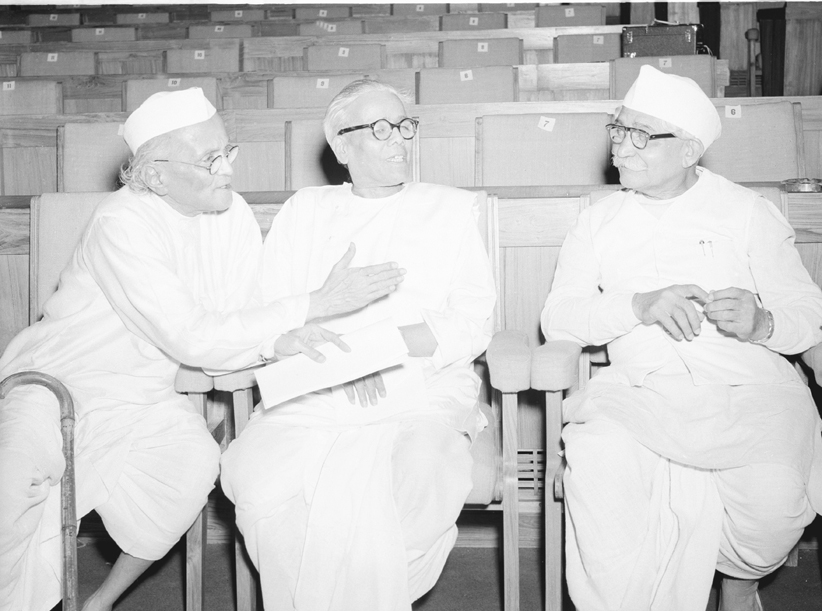
- Jaishankar Sundari (right) in conversation with Mama Warerkar (left) and C. G. Kolhatkar (centre) at the presentation of Sangeet Natak Akademi Awards in New Delhi on 31 March 1957
- Born: Jaishankar Bhudhardas Bhojak; 30 January 1889; Undhai near Visnagar, Gujarat
- Died: 22 January 1975 (aged 85); Visnagar
- Other name: Jaishankar Sundari
- Occupations: Theatre actor and director
- Years active: 1897 – 1932 (acting), 1948 – 1964 (direction)
- Known for: Saubhagya Sundari (1901)

Jaishankar Bhudhardas Bhojak (30 January 1889 – 22 January 1975), better known by his theatre name Jaishankar Sundari, was an Indian actor and director of Gujarati theatre. Starting at the young age, he rose to fame for his roles of female impersonator in early Gujarati plays. He retired from acting in 1932 but returned to theatre direction and teaching in 1948. He directed and acted in several successful plays. He was awarded the Ranjitram Suvarna Chandrak in 1951 and the Padma Vibhushan in 1971.

== Early life ==
He was born in the family of Bhojak, in Undhai near Visnagar on 30 January 1889 to Bhudhardas and Krishna. However, his family members were traditionally involved in performing arts and singing. He studied up to second standard. He was trained in performing arts and singing by his grandfather, Tribhuvandas who himself was trained by Ustad Fakhruddin. He was also trained in music by Pandit Vadilal Nayak. His father conducted rituals and performed in Jain temples.

== Career ==
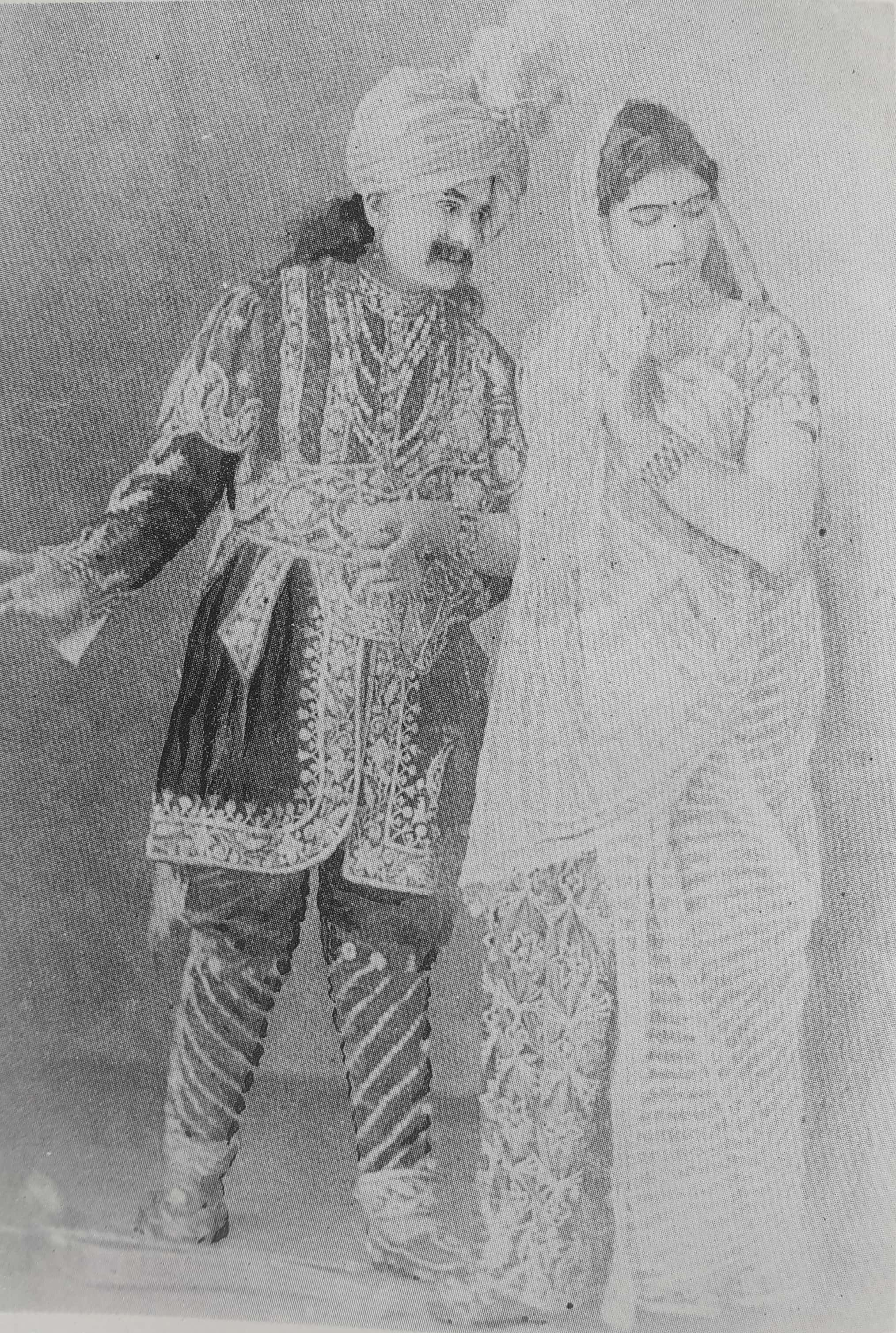
Bapulal Nayak (left) and Jaishankar Bhojak 'Sundari' in the play Kamlata, at Gaiety Theatre, Bombay, 1904

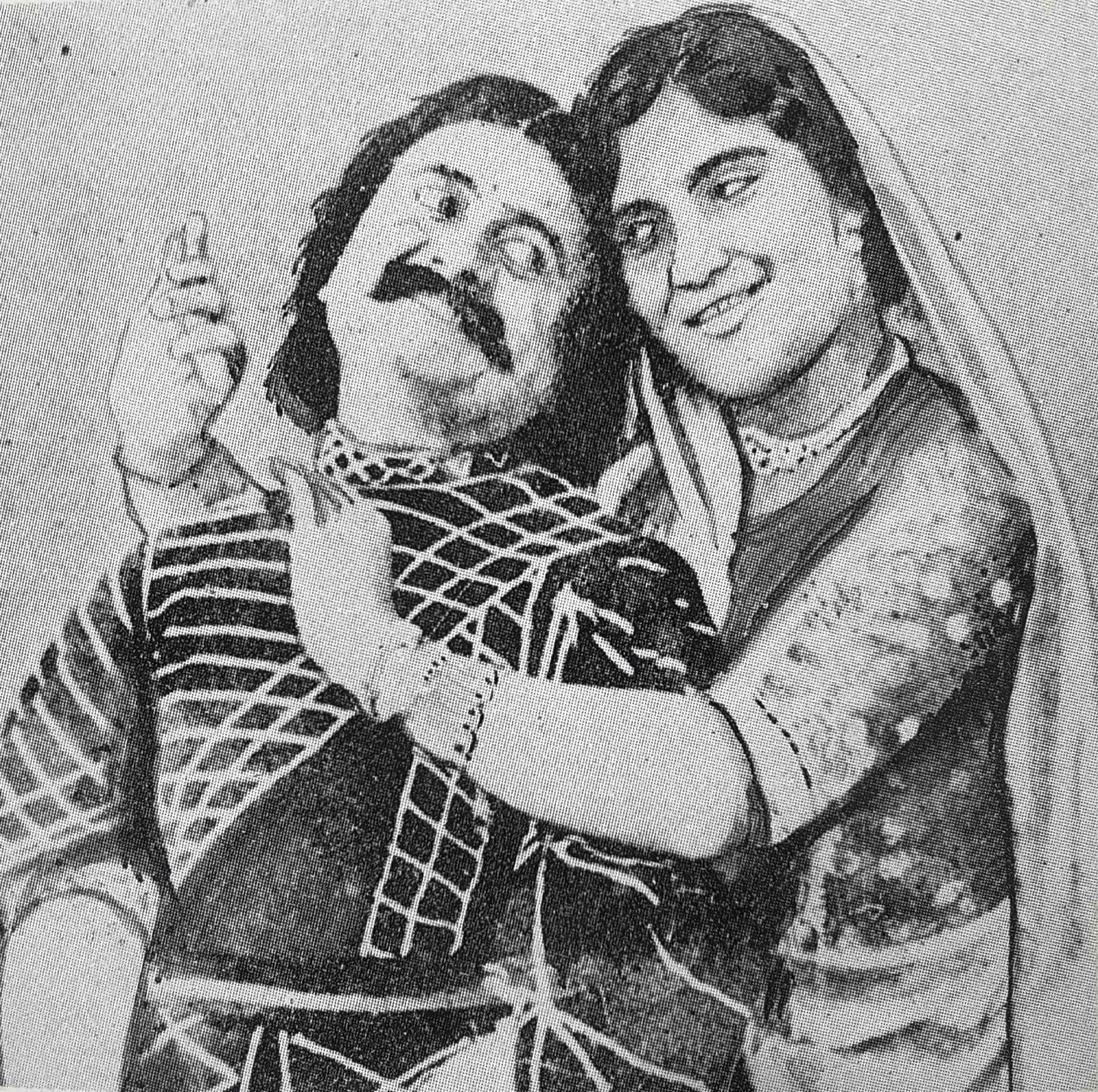
Bapulal Nayak (left) and Jaishankar Bhojak 'Sundari' in a play Sneh-Sarita, 1915

He started his career by joining Dadabhai Thunthi's Urdu performing art company in Calcutta in 1897. He worked in a chorus of girls for a salary of six rupees a month. He returned to Bombay and joined Chotalal Kapadia's Mumbai Gujarati Natak Mandali in 1901. Along with Gujarati, he also performed in Hindi and Urdu languages. He mainly performed as a female impersonator as females were not allowed in theatres in those times. He played role of Desdemona as a female impersonator in Saubhagya Sundari, an adaptation of Shakespeare's Othello by Parsi theatre in Bombay. It was successful and Jaishankar received his sobriquet Sundari (lit. 'beautiful lady'). He performed female lead opposite Bapulal Nayak several times including in Jugal Jugari (Jugal the Gambler), Kamlata (Lovestruck Girl, 1904), Madhu Bansari (Sweet Flute) and Sneh Sarita (River of Affection), Vikrama Charitra (Vikrama's Life, 1902). He along with Bapulal brought Govardhanram Tripathi's Saraswatichandra, Nrisinh Vibhakar's nationalistic plays and plays of Mulshankar Mulani to stage. He retired in 1932 and returned to Visnagar. In Vikrama Charitra, he played a character of Rambha, a dairy-maid. This play continued for three years and was performed 160 times, on every Saturday night.

He was active in Ahmedabad from 1948 to 1964 as the director and teacher in theatre. He joined Gujarat Vidhya Sabha in 1948 in Ahmedabad to perform in Ramanbhai Neelkanth's Raino Parvat in 1950 on the occasion of its centenary. Later he organised a performing troupe and theatre school, Natmandal with Rasiklal Parikh and Ganesh Mavlankar. He revived Bhavai, the traditional performing art form, by directing Mithyabhiman (False Vanity, 1955), a satirical play by Dalpatram. They produced several plays like Mena Gurjari (Mena of Gujarat) in 1953 which he synthesized Bhavai and Beijing Opera. He trained several actors including Jaswant Thaker, Dina Pathak, Pransukh Nayak and Kailash Pandya.

He died on 22 January 1975 at Visnagar, Gujarat.

== Recognition ==
He received the Ranjitram Suvarna Chandrak in 1951; which is considered the highest literary award in Gujarati literature. In 1957, the President of India Rajendra Prasad presented him with the highest Indian recognition given to practicing artists - the President's award, now called the Sangeet Natak Akademi award for drama direction. In 1963, he was elected chairman for the Department of Arts at Gujarati Sahitya Parishad. He was felicitated by Gujarat Rajya Sangeet Nrutya Akademi in 1967. He was awarded Padma Bhushan, the third highest civilian award, by the Government of India in 1971.

== Legacy ==
His autobiography Thoda Aansu, Thoda Ful in Gujarati was in part written and in part dictated to his son Dinkar Bhojak and Somabhai Patel over a period of four years. It was first published posthumously in 1976. It was adopted as part of the syllabus at the Master of Arts course level at the Gujarat University. It was reprinted in 1989 in an expanded version in the birth centenary year. In 2002, the first edition was translated into Hindi as Kuchh Aansu, Kuchh Phool by Dinesh Khanna and published by the National School of Drama. In 2011, it was translated in English as Some Blossoms, Some Tears.

Jaishankar Sundari Natyagruh - a drama theatre - was named after him in Ahmedabad, Gujarat. The Bhavai Government Museum in Vadnagar, North Gujarat has an exhibition and description of his works. His oil painted portrait was unveiled by the Kala Mandal of Morbi and adorns the halls of the Kala Mandir in Saurashtra.

A play Sundari : An Actor Prepares based on his autobiography was produced in 1998.
