= Gujarati theatre =

Indian Theatre

Gujarati theatre refers to theatre performed in the Gujarati language, including its dialects. Gujarati theatre is produced mainly in Gujarat and Maharashtra, in cities like Mumbai, Ahmedabad and Baroda, Surat and elsewhere Gujarati diaspora exists, especially North America. Rustam Sohrab, performed by Parsee Natak Mandali on 29 October 1853 in Mumbai, marked the beginning of Gujarati theatre.

== History ==
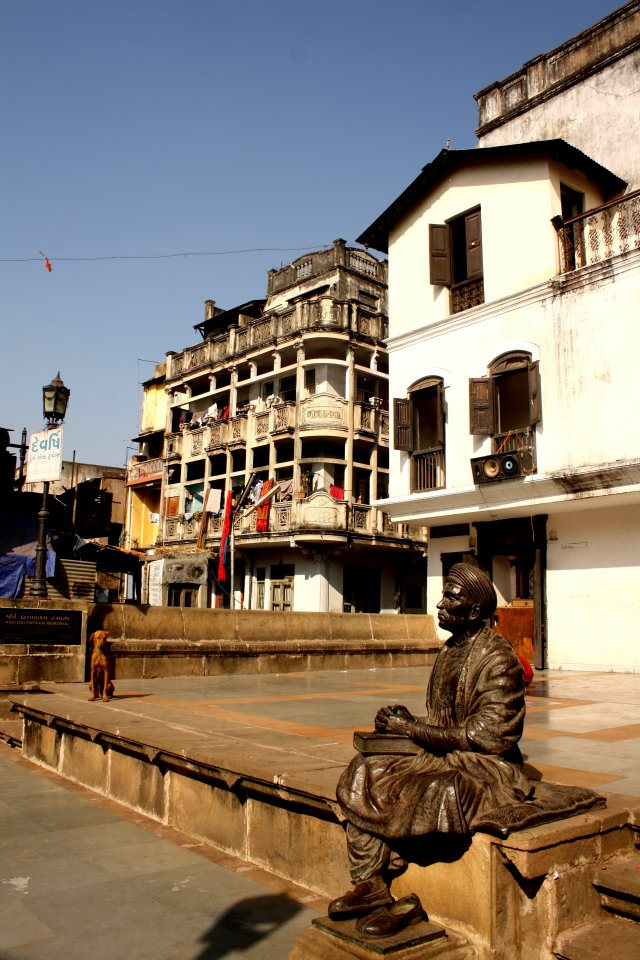
Statue of Dalpatram who wrote first Gujarati play, Laxmi in 1850. Dalpatram Chok, Ahmedabad.

=== Pre-British Raj ===
The region of Gujarat has a long tradition of folk-theatre, Bhavai, which originated in the 14th-century. Thereafter, in early 16th century, a new element was introduced by Portuguese missionaries, who performed Yesu Mashiha Ka Tamasha, based on the life of Jesus Christ, using the Tamasha folk tradition of Maharashtra, which they imbibed during their work in Goa or Maharashtra. Sanskrit drama was performed in royal courts and temples of Gujarat, it did not influence the local theatre tradition for the masses.

=== European Influence ===
During British Raj, British officials invited foreign operas and theatre groups to entertain them, this in turn inspired local Parsis to start their own travelling theatre groups, largely performed in Gujarati. The first play published in Gujarati was Laxmi Natak by Dalpatram in 1850, it was inspired by ancient Greek comedy Plutus by Aristophanes.

=== Advent of Parsi Theatre ===
In the year 1852, a Parsi theatre group performed a Shakespearean play in Gujarati language in the city of Surat. In 1853, Parsee Natak Mandali the first theatre group of Gujarati theatre was founded by Framjee Gustadjee Dalal, which staged the first Parsi-Gujarati play, Rustam Sohrab based on the tale of Rostam and Sohrab part of the 10th-century Persian epic Shahnameh by Ferdowsi on 29 October 1853, at the Grant Road Theatre in Mumbai, this marked the begin of Gujarati theatre. The group also performed a farce Dhanji Gharak at the same venue. In its early days, Gujarati theatre largely adopted the entertainment-led style and themes of Parsi theatre, and the plays which were presented in a mix of Gujarati with Urdu and English languages. From being performed without a stage as in the case of Bhavai, raised platforms were added, then backgrounds, which gradually led to the proscenium theatre. Dalpatram formed a theatre group to reform the vulgar element in the bhavai performance of the time, and also the faulty Gujarati language used by Parsi theatre across Mumbai theatre circuit.

=== Modernization ===
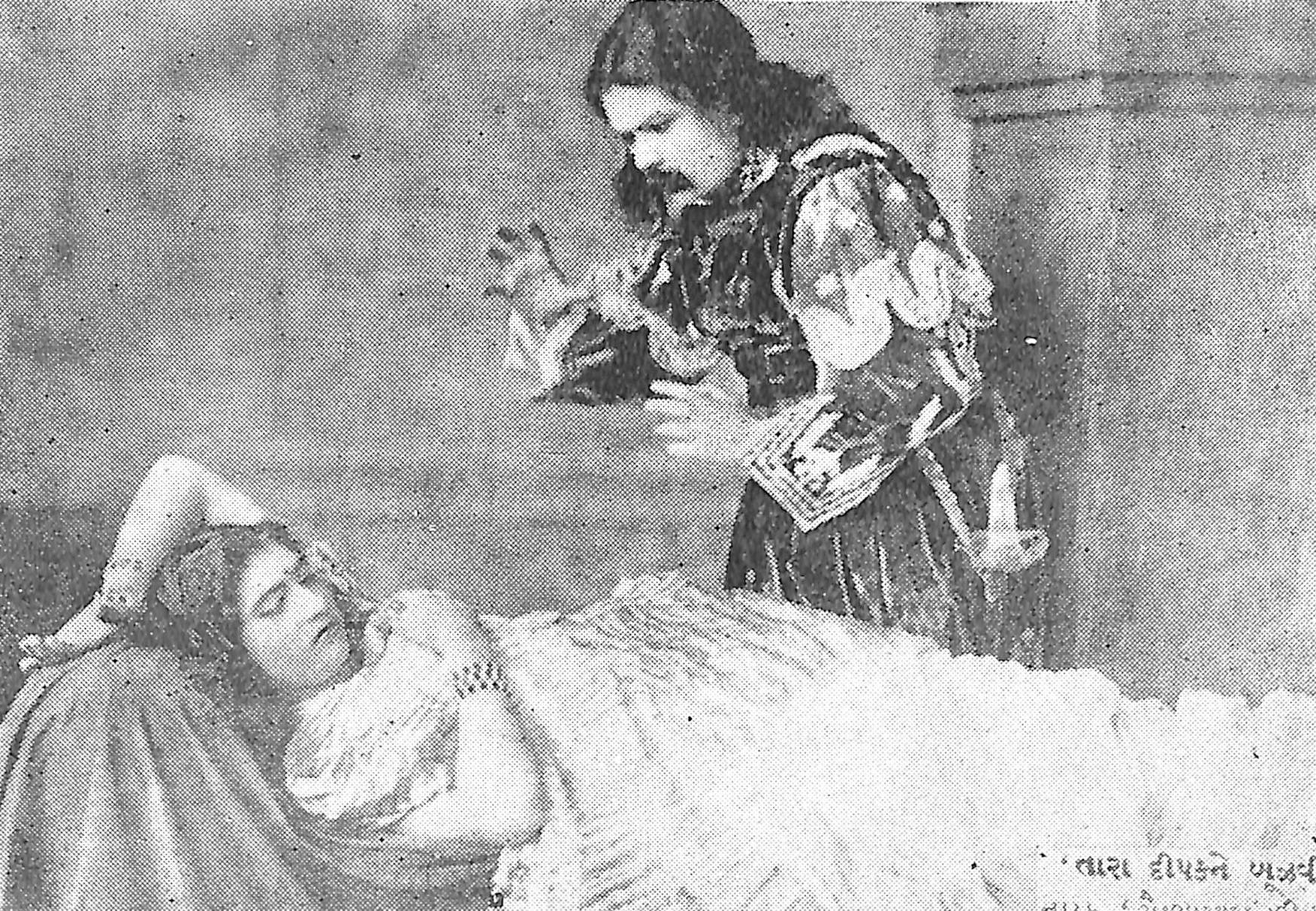
Bapulal Nayak and Jaishankar Sundari in Mulshankar Mulani's popular play Saubhagya Sundari (1901)

Gradually as the numbers of plays being written and performed in Gujarati increased things changed, and finally a theatre group to steer away from the tradition of Parsi theatre and the Bhavai and incorporated elements of Indian and Western dramaturgy was Arya Subodh Natak Mandali was formed in 1878, in Morbi by Mulji and Vaghji Oza, and their first production, Bharthari continued to be staged in Gujarat and Saurashtra region for many years. In the 1880s, as many as seven theatre groups came up, including Deshi Natak Samaj started by Dahyabhai Dholashaji, which lasted from 1889 to 1980. Gujarati Natak Mandali (1878–89) and its successor Mumbai Gujarati Natak Mandali (1889-1948) were pioneer Gujarati theatre companies.

In late 19th-century, theatre gained strength and travelling theatre companies became popular, performing plays based on a limited repertoire of mythological and religious plays. On the other hand, commercial theatre stuck to entertainment-oriented comedies, which delayed the arrival of experimental amateur theatre movement. That happened only in the 1920s and 1930s, with the rise of playwrights like C. C. Mehta (1901-1991), who wrote plays with a social context and Ranchhodlal Udayaram Dave (1837- 1923), playwright and producer. They are regarded as the father of modern Gujarati theatre. Mehta's most important play, Aag Garhi (Fire Engine), about an ailing fireman, marked the rise of amateur theatre movement in Gujarati theatre. Mehta went to write over 25 plays, numerous one act plays and radio plays; then in 1970, he himself translated his most known work, Aag Garhi as Iron Road. Sarjanhar was another important play of the period, inspired by Gandhian ideologies, it dealt with untouchability and was staged by popular actors of the time Sukhlal and Harilal.

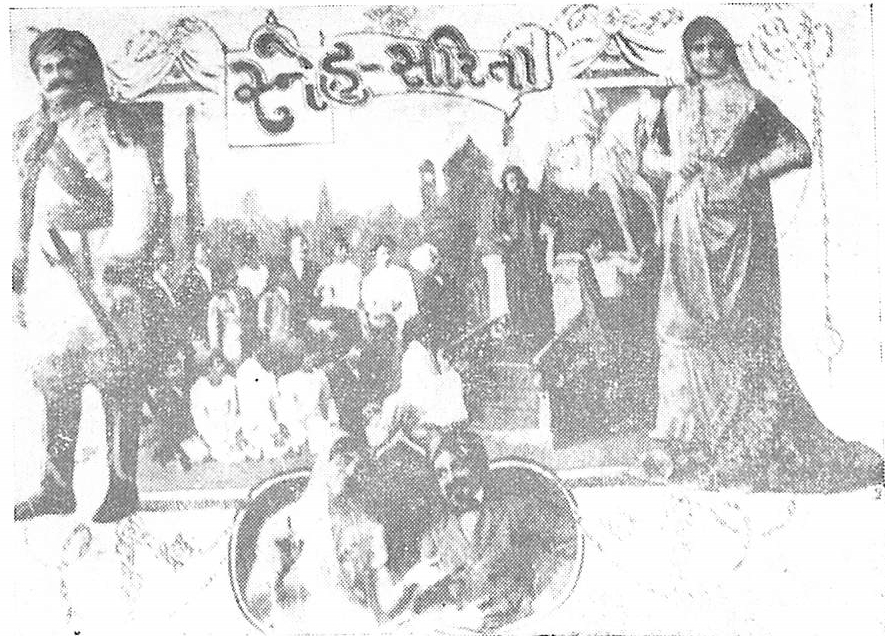
Advertisement of Sneh Sarita, a 1915 play

By the 1920s, theatre had become an integral part of the festive calendar. Elaborate sets and costumes became the high point of the period, and important actors of the era were Bapulal Nayak and Jaishankar Bhojak 'Sundari' (1889-1975), who worked both in old-style as well as the emerging experimental theatre, and became a legend like Bal Gandharva in Marathi theatre. In 1937, Ranbhoomi Parishad, was formed in Ahmedabad which tried to present major dramatists of the period on common platform for the first time.

K. M. Munshi wrote notable social satires and foreign plays were getting translated as well, including Ibsen's A Doll's House was translated into Gujarati as Dhinagli by Pranjivan Pathak in 1923, though realism in acting which the production demanded was yet to arrive. However, the rise Mehta and Munshi as playwrights unfortunately fell in an era of overall decline of theatre, initiated by the birth of talkies in Indian cinema in the 1930s, by the 1950s, the old school professional theatre has all but disappeared, and the itinerant Parsi theatre vanished completely.

=== Post-independence ===
In the post-independence era, a new spurt in growth of Gujarati theatre was seen in the 1950s, and theatre groups started rising again in Mumbai, Ahmedabad and Baroda, including Nat Mandal and Rang Mandal, and most notably, the commercial theatre company, Rangbhumi. Besides Mehta, Pragji Dosa, wrote some award-winning play in the 1950s, though playwriting in Gujarati largely remained limited to adaptations and translations. In 1952, Nat Mandal, was formed in Ahmedabad, which once again aimed to provide a common platform to various far flung practitioners of Gujarati theatre.

Soon the traditional Bhavai musicals were also revived by theatre directors, like Shanta Gandhi, who wrote and directed Jasma Odan (1968) based on Gujarati folk tale, while Dina Pathak (then Gandhi) produced and performed the lead role in Mena Gujari. In 1957, when she performed the play in front then President, Rajendra Prasad at the Rashtrapati Bhawan in Delhi, it became the first and the only Gujarati play to have achieved the feat so far.

Meanwhile, Gujarati diaspora in North America saw not just quality literature coming out from their midst, but also a vibrant Gujarati theatre. In Vadodara theatre was patronized by Sayajirao Gaekwad III, and the city dubbed the cultural capital of Gujarat, and known for the Gandharva Natak Mandali. In the 1950, numerous groups were formed in the city including, Nutan Sanskar Kendra, Trimurti, Natya Vihar, Bhartiya Kala Kendra and Universal Art Forum, and the following decades saw formed for groups like Rangavali (1974), Kashunk, Vishkambhak, Aakar Theatre (1980), Intimate, Jayashree Kala Niketan and Navchetan. The city still had ten theatre groups in the 1990s, but gradually lost much of its theatre groups and audiences by the 2000s, despite theatre groups still existing in Surat and Rajkot. After mid 2000s, Gujarati theatre experienced a revival and has been growing steadily.

However, the struggle for dominance between double meaning comedies, big stars-led commercial theatre and experimental theatre continues well into the present times, though many have tried to straddle the middle road and bridge the gap. In 2011, National Centre for the Performing Arts (NCPA), Mumbai in an effort to promote experimental theatre hosted its first Gujarati theatre festival, Vasant - Gujarati Natya Utsav.

== See also ==
- Parsi theatre

== Bibliography ==
- Stanley Hochman; McGraw-Hill, inc (1984). "Indian theatre". McGraw-Hill Encyclopedia of World Drama. VNR AG. ISBN 0070791694.
- Colin Chambers (2006). The Continuum Companion to Twentieth Century Theatre. Continuum International Publishing Group. ISBN 1847140017.
- Shailesh Tevani (2003). C.C. Mehta: Makers of Indian Literature Series. Sahitya Akademi. ISBN 8126016760.
- Hasamukh Baradi (2003). History of Gujarati Theatre. Translated by Vinod Meghani. National Book Trust, India. ISBN 8123740328.
- Sisir Kumar Das (1995). A History of Indian Literature 1911-1956: Struggle for Freedom: Triumph and Tragedy. Sahitya Akademi. ISBN 8172017987.
- Paul Robert Magocsi; Multicultural History Society of Ontario (1999). Encyclopedia of Canada's peoples - G - Reference. University of Toronto Press. ISBN 0802029388.
- K. M. George (1995). "Modern Gujarati Drama". Modern Indian Literature: An Anthology. Plays and prose. Sahitya Akademi. ISBN 8172017839.
- Amaresh Datta, ed. (1988). Encyclopaedia of Indian Literature: devraj to jyoti, Vol. 2. Sahitya Akademi. ISBN 8126011947.
- Nalini Natarajan; Emmanuel Sampath Nelson (1996). "Gujarati literature". Handbook of Twentieth Century Literatures of India. Greenwood Publishing Group. ISBN 0313287783.
- Sujit Mukherjee (1999). A Dictionary of Indian Literatures: Beginnings -1850. Orient Blackswan. ISBN 8125014535.
