= DJT (disambiguation) =

DJT is an initialism for Donald John Trump (born 1946), the 45th and 47th president of the United States.

DJT may also refer to:

== In relation to Donald Trump ==
- Donald John Trump Jr. (born 1977), businessman, political activist, and the eldest son of Donald John Trump
- DJT, IATA code for President Donald J. Trump International Airport (formerly Palm Beach International Airport) in Florida
- DJT (restaurant), a restaurant in the Trump International Hotel Las Vegas
- DJT, a former New York Stock Exchange symbol for Trump Hotels and Casino Resorts
- DJT, a ticker symbol for Trump Media & Technology Group

== Other uses ==
- DJT, the Central Directorate of the technical and scientific police in the Federal Police of Belgium
- "DJT", a 2013 song by Aubrey O'Day from her EP Between Two Evils
- DJT, an index ticker symbol for the Dow Jones Transportation Average
- La Compagnie, a French airline (ICAO code: DJT)
