= Chandravadan Mehta =

Gujarati playwright and critic (1901–1991)

Chandravadan Chimanlal Mehta
- Born: 6 April 1901; Surat, British India
- Died: 4 May 1991 (aged 90)
- Education: B. A.
- Occupations: Playwright, critic, autobiographer, poet, broadcaster, travel writer
- Spouse: Vilas (m. 1925; div. 1938)
- Writing career
- Language: Gujarati
- Notable work: Natya Gathariyan
- Notable awards: Padma Shri (1962); Sahitya Academy Award (1971); Sangeet Natak Akademi Fellowship (1984)

Chandravadan Chimanlal Mehta (6 April 1901 – 4 May 1991), popularly known as C. C. Mehta or Chan. Chi. Mehta, was a Gujarati playwright, theatre critic, bibliographer, poet, story writer, autobiographer, travel writer and broadcaster from Vadodara, Gujarat, India.

== Biography ==
Chandravadan Mehta was born on 6 April 1901 in Surat. His primary education was in Vadodara and secondary education in Surat. He matriculated in 1919 and completed B. A. in Gujarati from the Elphinstone College, Bombay (now Mumbai) in 1924. In 1928, he joined Mahatma Gandhi in the Bardoli Satyagraha. He also joined Navbharat daily as an editor in 1928. From 1933 to 1936, he taught at New Era High School, Mumbai.

He joined the All India Radio (AIR)-Bombay in 1938 and became the director of AIR-Ahmedabad in 1954. During his tenure, he developed the broadcasting culture in Gujarat, wrote and produced several radio plays and documentaries with directors like Adi Marzban and others. After retirement, he was associated with the performing arts departments of the Maharaja Sayajirao University of Baroda and the Gujarat Vidyapith. He pioneered the theatre education in India and started diploma and degree courses in theatre in the Maharaja Sayajirao University of Baroda. He represented India in the international theatre fora.

He married Vilas in 1925. They divorced in 1938. He died on 4 May 1991.

== Works ==
Mehta is considered as the pioneer of the modern Gujarati theatre. His plays are focused on the stagecraft which has diversity of subjects including tragedy, comedy, satire as well as historical, social, mythological, biographical plays.

Theatre and plays

In early 1920, he presented two unscripted soliloquies which created a stir. He criticized and led a protest against the depiction of women in College Kanya (College Girl, 1925), a play produced by the Mumbai Gujarati Natak Mandali.

Mehta wrote over 25 plays, numerous one-act plays and radio plays. He, along with his friends, wrote and produced several realistic plays such as Akho (1927), Agagadi (1933, translated as Iron Road in 1970), Narmad (1937) and Dhara Gurjari (Land of Gujarat, 1944, published 1968). Aagagadi, about an ailing fireman, marked the rise of amateur theatre movement in the Gujarati theatre. His other published plays include Mungi Stree (1927), Akho, Varvahu ane Bija Natako (1933), Ramakadani Dukan (1934), Nagabava (1937), Premnu Moti Ane Bija Natako (1937), Sita (1943), Mazamrat (Dark Mindnight, 1955), Hololika (1956, published 1957) and Savitri- a dramatization of Sri Aurobindo's Savitri. Hololika, written in format of Bhavai, a traditional Gujarati theatre form, is a satire on the corrupt judicial system. He also published following plays: Shikharini (1946), Panjarapol (1947), Mena Popat Athva Hathighoda (1951), Rangbhandar (1953), Sonavatakdi (1955), Madira (Media) (1955), Kishor Natako Part 1-2 (1956), Kapoorno Deevo (1960), Param Maheshwar (1960), Sati (1960), Karoliyanu Jalu (1961), Shakuntala Athva Kanyaviday (1966), Andar Andar (1969), Abola Rani (1972), Santakukadi (1972), Chandravadan Mehtana Pratinidhi Ekankio (1974), Antar-Bahir Ane Bija Natako (1975). He extensively wrote on the history of Gujarati theatre and production techniques.

Theatre criticism

His expertise in theatre and stagecraft as well as his extensive knowledge of international theatre is visible in his works of theatre criticism. He had written eleven works on theatre criticism: Kavishri Nanalalna Natako Ane Akbarshahni Rangbhumi Par Rajuat (1959), Natak Bhajavata (1962), Lyric (1962), Lyric Ane Lagarik (1965), Natyarang (1973), American Theatre (1974), Europe na Deshoni Natyashrishti (1974), Japannu Theatre (1975), Vak (1975), Ekanki: Kyare Kya Ane Keva Uprant Bija Natyavishayak Lekho.

Theatre bibliography

His Bibliography of Stagable Plays in Indian Languages Part 1-2 (1964, 1965) is his work of theatre research which received acclaim for him in the theatre of Europe. It has an extensive list of plays written and staged in India in the 19th and 20th century arranged according to years, writers and characters. It took ten years to prepare this bibliography.

Poetry

Yamal (1926) is a collection of 14 sonnets. Elakavyo (1933) is 35 sonnets including a reprint of Yamal and a series of sonnets from Kanchanjangha. Chandarana (1935) is a collection of children's poetry. Ratan (1937) is a 1636 stanza long narrative poem in Prithvi metre. The poem depicts the sacrifice and death of a sister named Ratan. Rudo Rabari (1940) is his other narrative poem. Chado Re Shikhar Raja Ramna (1975) has 20 poems including unique poems such as "O New York" and "Colloquial Gujarati Kavita".

Stories

Khamma Bapu (1950) and Vatchakaravo (1967) are his short story collections. Mangalmayi (1975) has three true stories. He also wrote a novel Jeevati Putalio.

Prose

His prose writings include his twelve-volume autobiographical and travel writings, Gathariyan (Travel Bags) which were in unusual prose and simple language. These volumes are Bandh Gathariyan Part 1-2 (1954), Chhod Gathariyan (1956), Safar Gathariyan (1956), Bhamiye Gujarat Na Relpate Na Vate (1962), Rang Gathariyan (1965), Roop Gathariyan (1965), Natya Gathariyan (on theatre, 1971), Antar Gathariyan Part 1-2 (1973), Dhruv Gathariyan (1976) and Ganth Gathariyan (1976).

Other works

His other works include Radio Roopako, Premno Tant, Navbharatna Bhagyavidhata Sardar Vallabhbhaina Jeevan Par Bar Roopako. Mehta had composed the anthem of the Maharaja Sayajirao University of Baroda. He translated Cervantes's Don Quixote into Gujarati.

== Legacy ==
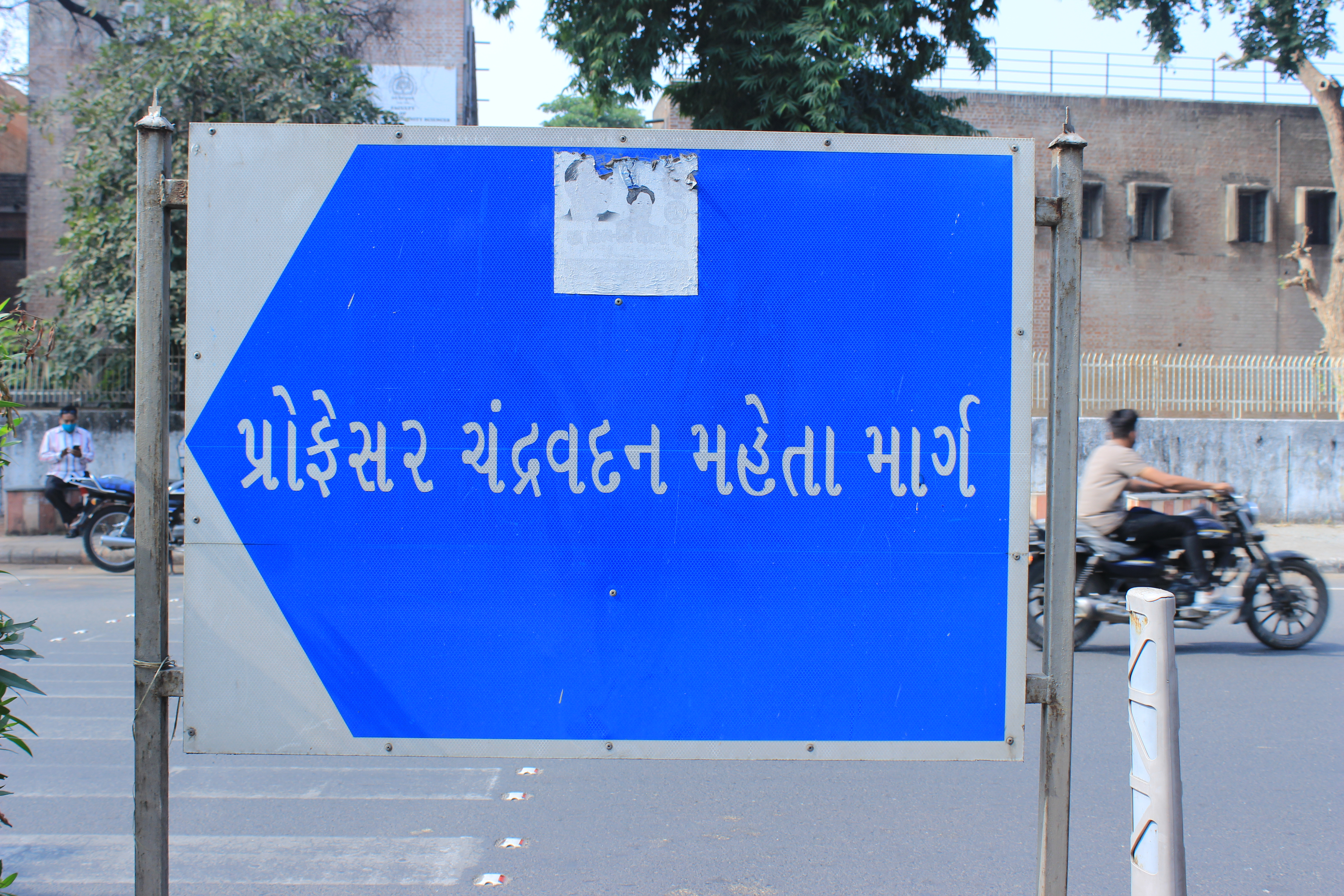
Chandravadan Mehta Marg - Vadodara

In 1960, at Vienna Conference at the International Theatre Institute under the aegis of UNESCO, he moved a resolution to celebrate 27 March, as the World Theatre Day. Gujarati writer Raghuveer Chaudhari wrote a play, Trijo Purush, based on his life.

== Awards ==
He received the Ranjitram Suvarna Chandrak in 1936 and the Narmad Suvarna Chandrak in 1942. He rejected the Kumar Chandrak awarded to him in 1950. In 1962, he was awarded the Padma Shri by the Government of India.

He won the 1971 Sahitya Akademi Award for Gujarati language for his autobiographical travelogue Natya Gathariyan. He was also awarded the Sangeet Natak Akademi Award for playwriting in Gujarati in 1971. In 1984, he was awarded the Sangeet Natak Akademi Fellowship, the highest honour conferred by the Sangeet Natak Akademi. He received Sahitya Gaurav Puraskar for the year 1991.

== See also ==
- List of Gujarati-language writers

Awards
Preceded by Nagindas Parekh	Recipient of the Sahitya Akademi Award winners for Gujarati; 1971	Succeeded by Umashankar Joshi
