= Detroj =

- Village
- Location in Gujarat, India Detroj (India)
- Coordinates: 23°20′N 72°11′E
- Country: India
- State: Gujarat
- District: Ahmedabad

Area
  - Total: 5 km^{2} (1.9 sq mi)
- Elevation: 51 m (167 ft)

Population (2011)
  - Total: 6,500
  - Density: 1,300/km^{2} (3,400/sq mi)

Languages
  - Official: Gujarati, Hindi][English
- Time zone: UTC+5:30 (IST)
- PIN: 382120
- Telephone code: 91-079
- Vehicle registration: GJ 1,38
- Lok Sabha constituency: Ahmedabad
- Civic agency: Detroj Gram panchayat
- Website: gujaratindia.com

Detroj is a village located in Ahmedabad district, Gujarat state, India. This village is the headquarters of Detroj-Rampura taluka, a taluka established in 2000.
