= Shamal Bhatt =

Gujarati Poet

Shamal Bhatt was a Gujarati poet.

== Life ==
The exact years of Shamal's lifetime are unknown. However, based on the composition dates of his works, he was likely born around 1696–98, and lived at least until 1765. His last name was Trivedi, but he wrote it as Bhat. His farther and mother were called Vireshwar and Anandibai respectively. His brother was named Ladha and his son was named Parshottam.

Details of his life are derived from references in his writing, as no other contemporary sources exist. Born into a Brahmin family, he first lived in Rajpur and Gomatipur, followed by Veganpur (all now suburbs of Ahmedabad). His career began as he followed the hereditary profession of kathakar, or religious storyteller. At this time, he had a guru, Nana Bhat. Three stories, Rupavati, Padmavati, and Madan-Mohana were written during this period, along with the first 15 tales of his 32 tale collection, Simhasanbatrishi. This collection, though unfinished, was the most well-liked of his early writings.

A bard named Guman Bahot heard of Shamal, and talked about him to his patron, Rakhidas. In 1729, Rakhidas invited Shamal to visit him, where he became his patron and gifted him land in Charotar district. It was there that he finished Simhasanbatrishi and wrote the rest of his stories.

== Works ==
There are 26 works attributed to Shamal:

1. Angadvishti
2. Ravana-Mandodari-Samvad
3. Shivapuran
4. Revakhand
5. Ranchhodjina Shaloka or Bodanakhyan
6. Draupadivastraharan
7. Vishveshvarakhyan
8. Kalimahatmya—Patai Rawalno Garbo
9. Shamal Ratnamala
10. Udyam-Karma-Samvad
11. Vinechatni Varta
12. Shukdevakhyan
13. Sundar Kamdar
14. Bhojkatha
15. Pandarmi Vidya
16. Rakhidas Charitra
17. Chandra-Charitra
18. Padmavati
19. Baras-Kasturi
20. Madana-Mohana
21. Nandabatrishi
22. Sudabahonteri
23. Batris Putalini Varta
24. Abharam Kulina Shaloka or Rustam Bahadurno Pavado
25. Gulbankavali
26. Jahandarsha Badshah
