= List of works by Manilal Dwivedi =

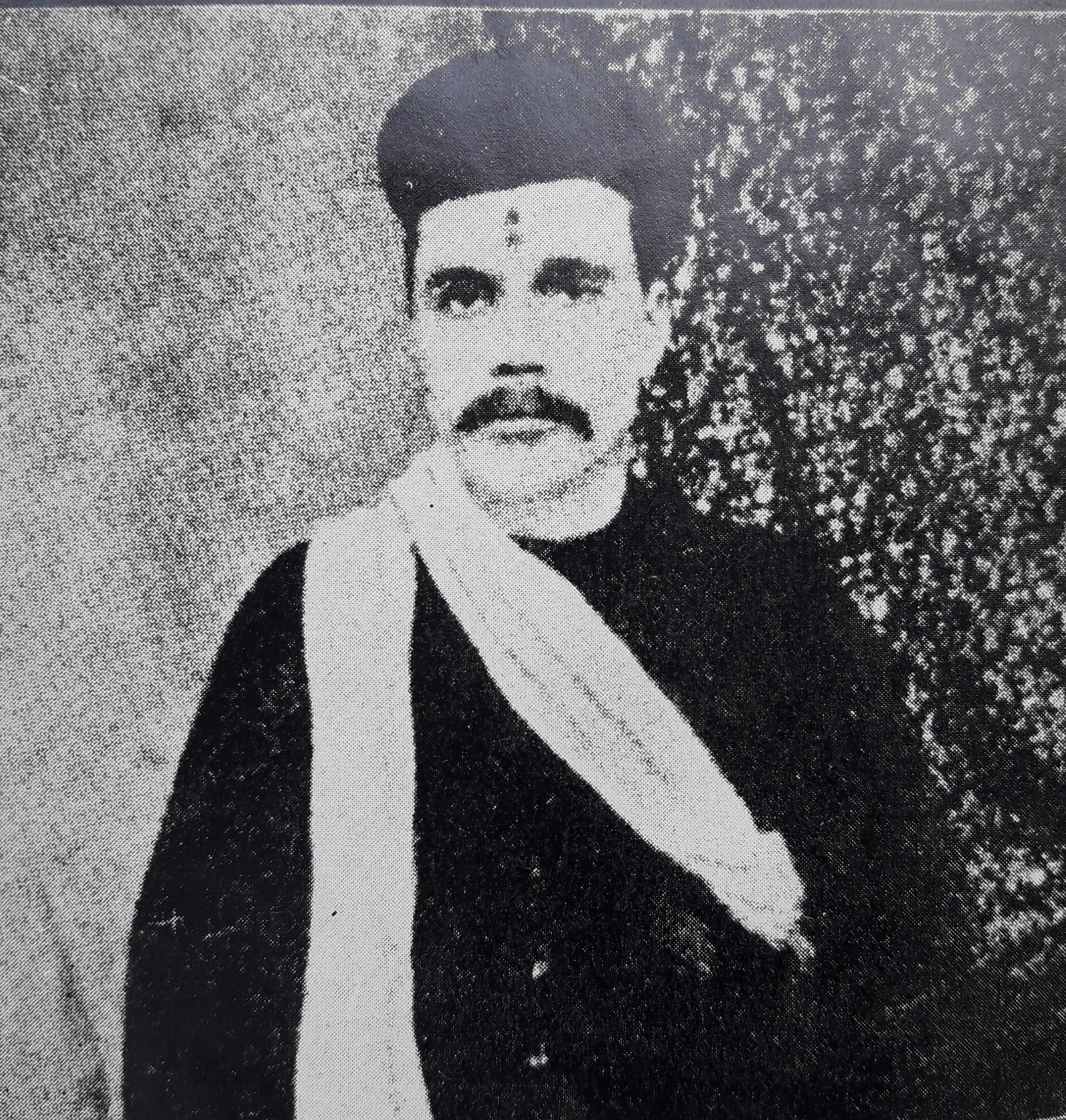
Manilal Dwivedi (1858–1898)

The works of Manilal Dwivedi (26 September 1858 – 1 October 1898) consists of poems, plays, essays, adaptation of an English novel, book-reviews, literary criticism, research, editing, translations, compilations and autobiography that Gujarati writer and philosopher Manilal Dwivedi created over his lifetime. Manilal's writing career started in 1876 with a poem, Shikshashatak, and continued till his death in 1898. After Manilal's death, his most works were edited and published by Gujarati writer and scholar Dhirubhai Thaker, who is considered to be an authority on Manilal Dwivedi.

Manilal's most writings appeared in his own monthlies Priyamvada and Sudarshan, which he edited from 1885 until his death. He translated several works into Gujarati from English, Sanskrit and Hindi. He offered critical editions with English translation of various Sanskrit and Prakrit works in the Gaekwad Oriental Series of Baroda.

== Works ==
The list of works by Manilal Dwivedi:

=== Gujarati ===
==== Original ====
Name of the Publication	Year of Publication	Notes
Shikshashataka	1876	
Atmanimajjan	1895	
Kanta	1882	
Nrusinhavatar	1955	Written in 1896
Nari Pratishtha	1885	
Prana Vinimaya	1888	
Balvilas	1893	
Sudarshan Gadyawali	1909	Published posthumously
Siddhantasara	1889	
Purvadarshana	1882	
Prasiddha Jain Pustakoman Dirasthahastalikhita Granthoman Kramapradarshakapatram	1886	
Manilal Nabhubhai Dwivedinu Atmavrittanta (to 1895)	1979	Published posthumously, edited by Dhirubhai Thaker
Kavyamayukha	-	Incomplete
Gaurishankar U. Ozanu Jivancharitra	-	Incomplete

==== Translation and Adaptation ====
Name of the Publication	Year of Publication	Notes
From Sanskrit
Malatimadhava	1880	
Uttararamacharitam	1882	
Shrinmd Bhagavad Gita	1894	
Panchshati	1895	
Vivada-tandava	1901	
Chatuhsutri	1909	
Ramagita	-	Unpublished
Shishupalavadham	-	(With commentary) incomplete
Hanuman Natakam	-	Incomplete
Mahaviracharitam	-	Incomplete
Chhandonushasanam	-	Incomplete
Samaradityacharitam	-	Incomplete
Alankarachudamani	-	Incomplete
Jyotishkaranda	-	Incomplete
Vrittaratnakaravritti	-	Incomplete
Rudrashringaratilakam	-	Incomplete
Rasmanjaritika	-	Incomplete
Naishadhiyatika	-	Incomplete
Svadvada-ratnakaravatarika	-	Incomplete
Abhinandanakavyam (or Nabhinandan)	-	Incomplete
From English
Chestertonno Putra Prati Upadesh tatha Samkshipta Suvakya	1890	In collaboration with Gopaldas H. Desai
Charitra	1895	
Chetanashastra	1896	
Vakpatava	1897	
Gulabsinh	1897	An adaptation of Edward Bulwer-Lytton's Zanoni
Shikshan ane Svashikshan	1897	
Nyayashastra-paramarshakhand	1897	
Swami Vivekanandani Americani Mulakato	Unpublished	
From Hindi
Shri Vrittiprabhakara	1895	

==== Edited with translations ====
Name of the Publication	Year of Publication
Sanskrit
Buddisagara	1891
Anubhavpraipika	1891
Samadhishatakam	1891
Bhojprabandha	1892
Tarkabhasha	1892
Shrutisarasamuddharanam	1892
Shri Dvyashraya Mahakavyam	1893
Shad-darshana-samuchchaya	1893
Vastupalcharitra	1893
Vikramcharitra	1894
Sara-samgraha - I	1894
Sara-samgraha - II	1894
Chaturvimshatiprabandha	1895
Yogabindu	1899
Kumarapalacharitam	1899
Anekantavadapravesha	1899
Old Gujarati
Panchopakhyana	-

=== English ===
==== Original ====
Name of the Publication	Year of Publication
Suggestions for the revision of Gujarati Reading Series	1884
Letters on Widow-remarriage	1887
Monism or Advaitism?	1889
The Puranas	1891
Essays on Idol-worship, Samskaras, etc.	1891
The Advaita Philosophy of Shankara	1891
Jainism and Brahmanism	1891
Hinduism	1893
The Necessity of Spiritual Culture	1895
The Doctrine of Maya	1895

==== Edited with translation ====
Name of the Publication	Year of Publication	Notes
Raja-yoga	1885	
Tarka-kaumudi	1886	
Yogasutra	1890	
Mandukyopanishad	1894	
Jivan-muktiviveka	1894	
Samadhishatakam	1894	
The Imitation of Shankara	1895	
Syadvadamanjari	1933	Completed by Anandshankar Dhruv

=== Magazines ===
In 1885, Manilal founded and edited a journal called Priyamvada to discuss the problems faced by Indian women. In 1890, the same journal became wider in scope and was renamed Sudarshan.

== Sources ==
- Thaker, Dhirubhai (1983). Manilal Dwivedi. Makers of Indian Literature. New Delhi: Sahitya Akademi. OCLC 10532609.
