= Sudarshan Gadyawali =

Collection of prose-writings by Manilal Dwivedi (1909)

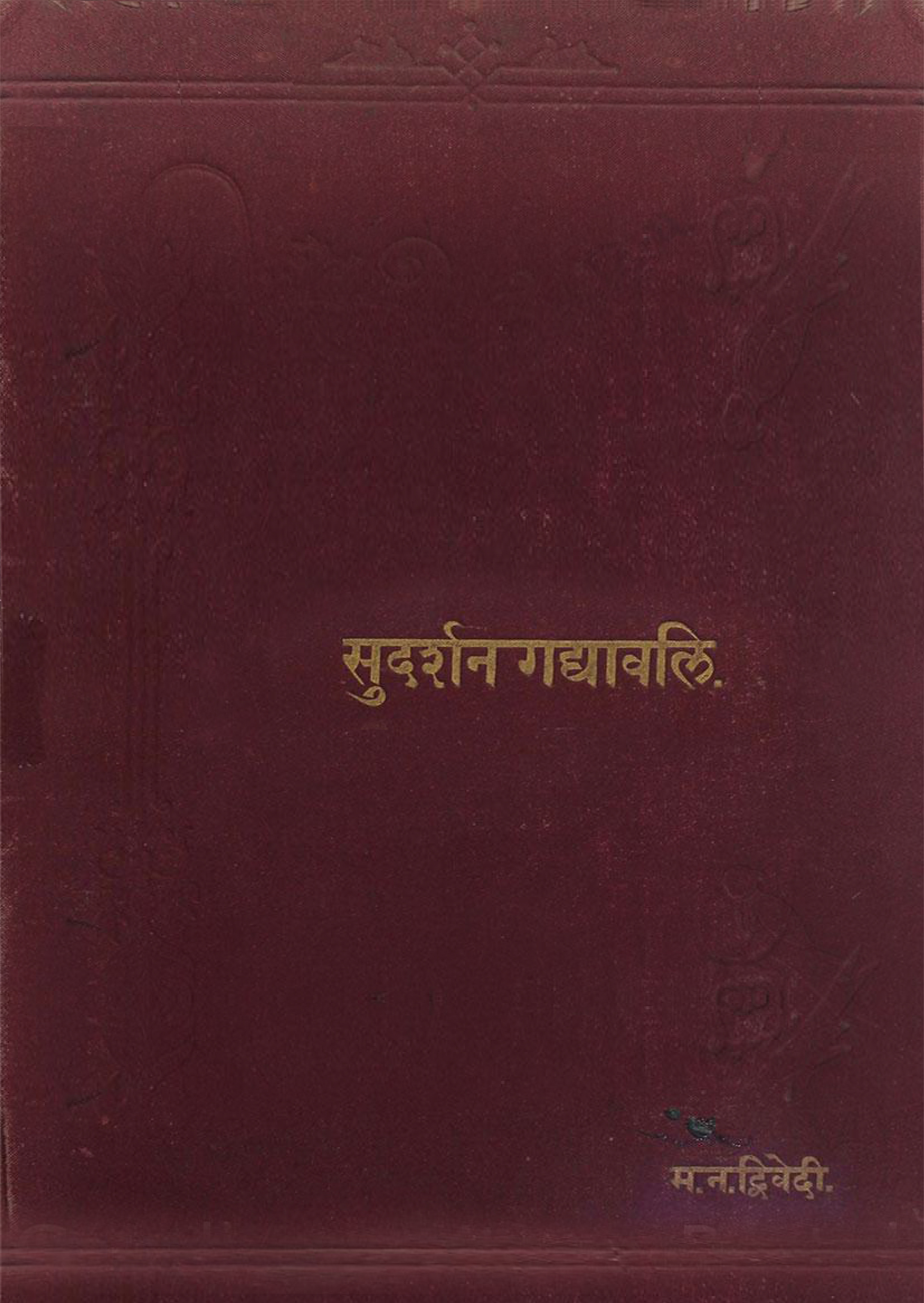
- Cover of first edition, 1909
- Author: Manilal Dwivedi
- Original title: સુદર્શન ગદ્યાવલિ
- Language: Gujarati
- Genre: Essays
- Publisher: Himmatlal Chhotalal Pandya; Pranshankar Gaurishankar Joshi
- Publication date: 1909
- Publication place: British India

Sudarshan Gadyawali (pronounced [su.dər.ʃən gə.dya.və.li]) is a 1909 collection of prose writings by Gujarati writer Manilal Dwivedi (1858–1898), which appeared in his journals Priyamvada and Sudarshan from 1885 to 1898. It contains essays on a broad range of subjects, including religion, ethics, social reform, education, politics, nationalism, theosophy, women's welfare, Eastern and Western philosophy, music, and literature, in addition to a number of book reviews.

== Publication history ==
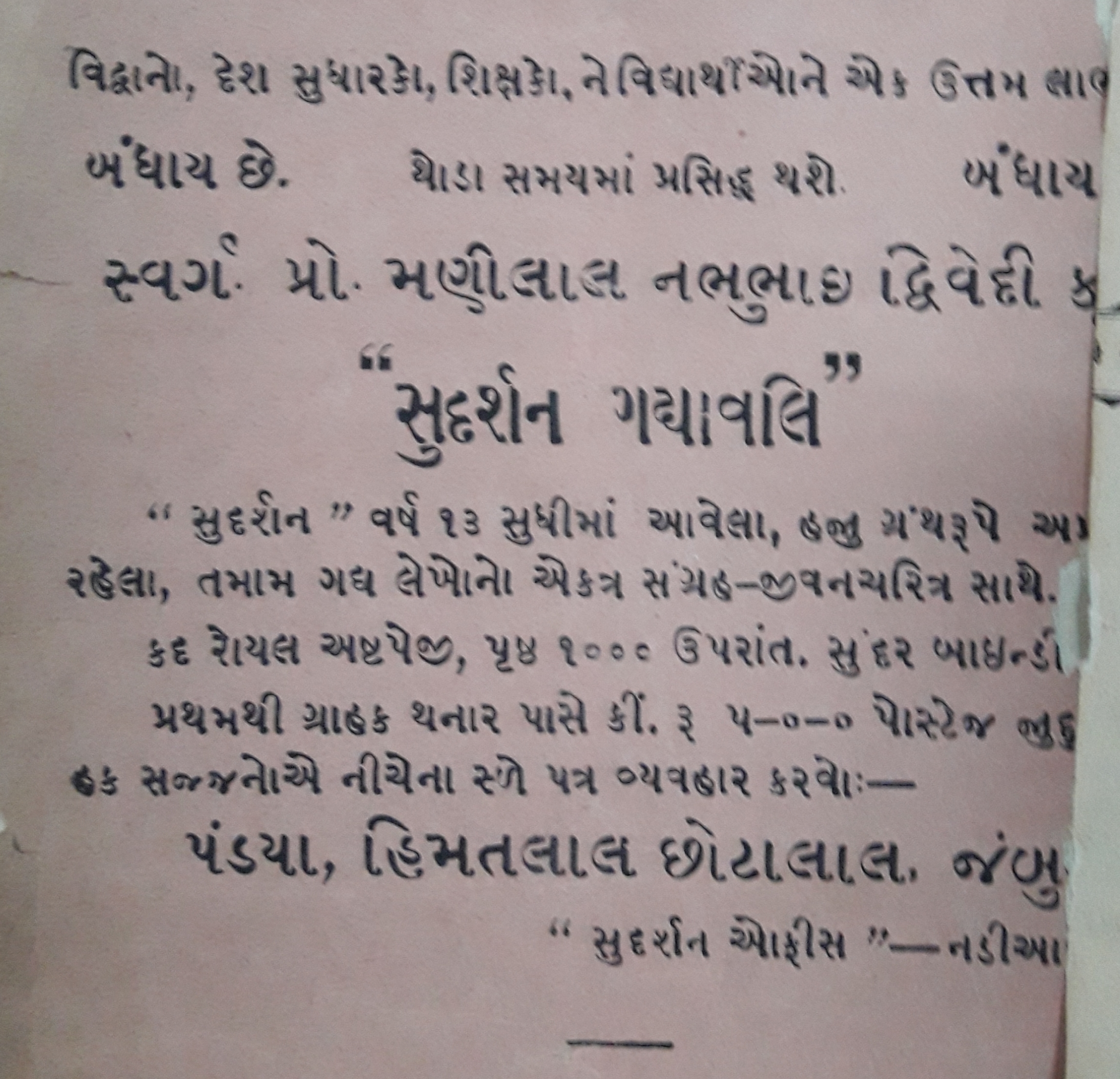
Sudarshan Gadyawali advertised in 1902 issue of Sudarshan magazine

With the exception of the pieces Siddhantasara, Pranavinimay, Kanta, and Nrusinhavatar, most of Manilal's prose writings and poems were published in his two journals, Priyamvada and Sudarshan. The works Gulabsinh, Shrimad Bhagvadgita (translated from Sanskrit), and Atmanimajjan (a collection of poems) were originally published in installments in his journals. They were later published in book form, during the author's lifetime.

Several of Manilal's most important articles from these journals remained unpublished in book form until 1909. In that year, two of his admirers, Himmatlal Chhotalal Pandya and Pranshankar Gaurishankar Joshi, working from Jambusar, a small town in Gujarat, collected, classified and published the articles as Sudarshan Gadyawali with the help of Anandshankar Dhruv, a Gujarati writer and Manilal's disciple-friend. The book was printed on 20-by-30-inch (510 mm × 760 mm) double crown paper, and consisted of some 1100 pages. It also included two articles on Manilal written by Anandshankar Dhruv.

In 1948, when it had gone out of print, Gujarat Vidya Sabha published selected articles from Sudarshan Gadyawali in two volumes, entitled Manilal Ni Vichardhara and Manilal Na Tran Lekho, both edited by Dhirubhai Thaker. These were about one third the size of Sudarshan Gadyawali.

Later, on the centenary of Manilal's death, all of the essays from Sudarshan Gadyawali were reprinted in the four-volume Manilal N. Dwivedi Sahityashreni (Complete Works of Manilal Dwivedi), under the title Sudarshan Gadyaguccha. These collected works were published by Gujarat Sahitya Akademi and edited by Dhirubhai Thaker.

== Contents ==
Manilal's concept of the "ideal essay" is largely based on his study of Francis Bacon and Ralph Waldo Emerson. According to Manilal, an "ideal essay" is one in which each word conveys a concrete image of experience, each sentence presents an orderly arrangement of thought, and each thought is of such living interest and significance that it immediately grips the reader's attention.

Among the many subjects covered in Sudarshan Gadyawali are religion, ethics, social reform, education, politics, nationalism, theosophy, women's welfare, Eastern and Western philosophies, music, and literature. There are articles on various literary topics, including the nature of poetry; the art of communication; and the characteristics of different literary genres, including drama, the novel, lyrical poetry, the essay, and biography. It also contains some 240 book reviews.

Manilal considered dhvani (suggestive meaning) an essential part of poetry, and of all of the arts. He concluded that "aesthetic pleasure" and "spiritual ecstasy" were interlaced. Manilal's approach to biography was influenced by Thomas Carlyle's concept of hero-worship.

== Reception ==
The critic Vishwanath Bhatt hailed Sudarshan Gadyavali as a "great treasure of essays in Gujarati literature", and cited Manilal as one of the best essayists of modern Gujarati literature. Another commentator, Mansukhlal Jhaveri, wrote that "Manilal emerges from the pages of the Sudarshan Gadyavali as a master of Gujarati prose". Dhirubhai Thaker cited it as 'one of the best collection in Gujarati literature'.
