= Chhotalal Rukhdev Sharma =

Indian playwright

Chhotalal Rukhdev Sharma (died 1926) was a Gujarati playwright.

== Biography ==
He had studied Sanskrit in childhood and had studied Raghuvansh by Kalidas. His first play Madhav Vilas (1899) was produced by Amdavad Gujarati Natak Company. He had a long career with Deshi Natak Samaj. He used unconventional Savaiya, Shikharini and Totak metres in musical plays instead of popular Betabaji metre. He wanted to start his own theatre company so he had consulted poet Fulchandbhai Shah to write Rajhans based on Dashakumaracharitra but he died soon in 1926.

== Works ==
His plays are as follows:

Works
Date	Title	Theatre company	Notes
1899	Madhav Vilas	Amdavad Gujarati Natak Company	
1904	Vijay Kamla	Deshi Natak Samaj	First act by Dahyabhai Dholshaji Zaveri
1905	Chandrasinh	Amdavad Gujarat Arya Natak Samaj	
26 October 1905	Sati Sita	Deshi Natak Samaj	
1906	Geetasundari	Deshi Natak Samaj	
6 September 1906	Bhagwadgeeta	Deshi Natak Samaj	
1908	Sati Draupadi	Deshi Natak Samaj	
1910	Jalim Tuliya	Deshi Natak Samaj	
11 March 1912	Saraswatichandra	Aryanitidarshak Natak Samaj	Based on Saraswatichandra by Govardhanram Tripathi
6 July 1912	Sanyasi	Deshi Natak Samaj	
12 December 1912	Kulin Nayika	Deshi Natak Samaj	
12 April 1913	Ajitsinh	Deshi Natak Samaj	
1914	Sati Sulochna	Deshi Natak Samaj	
1915	Sati Damayanti	Deshi Natak Samaj	
1916	Ashok	Deshi Natak Samaj	
1917	Siddha Satyendra	Kachchh Nitidarshak Natak Samaj	Based on Gulabsinh by Manilal Nabhubhai Dwivedi
1918	Ahalyabai	Kachchh Nitidarshak Natak Samaj	
1918	Rukmani Swayamvar	Kachchh Nitidarshak Natak Samaj	

== See also ==
- List of Gujarati-language writers
