= Gujarati (magazine) =

- Editor: Ichchharam Desai (1880–1912), Manilal Desai (1912–1929), Natwarlal Desai
- Frequency: Weekly
- Circulation: 2500 (1885)
- Publisher: Kaisar-i-Hindi (1880–1885), Gujarati Printing Press (1885–1929)
- Founder: Ichcharam Desai
- First issue: 6 June 1880
- Final issue: 15 December 1929
- Country: British India
- Based in: Bombay (now Mumbai)
- Language: Gujarati

Gujarati was a Gujarati language weekly published from 1880 to 1929 by Ichcharam Desai and his sons.

== History ==
In late nineteenth century, the majority of Gujarati magazines in Bombay (now Mumbai) were published by Parsi people. With focus of catering Hindu people, the Gujarati weekly was launched. It was the first Gujarati magazine for Hindus. The first issue with eight pages was printed at Kaisar-i-Hind Press and published on 6 June 1880. The name Gujarati was suggested by poet Narmad to its editor Ichchharam Desai. The weekly published articles on political, social and literary subjects. It was also instrumental in spreading the views of the Indian National Congress. It published articles in simple, non-Sanskritized Gujarati language focusing on common people. It became very popular all over Gujarat and Kathiawad.

The articles by Narmad published later in Dharmavichar were first appeared in Gujarati. Manilal Dwivedi's essay Nari Pratishtha was also first serialized in Gujarati as well as several historical novels by Kanaiyalal Munshi. In 1884, Gujarati Printing Press was established and Gujarati started being printed from there. Desai compiled and published Brihad Kavyadohan volume I—VIII (1886–1913), an anthology on medieval Gujarati poets and poetry, from Gujarati Press. Gujarati also published humour articles while the Gujarati Press published Sanskrit works and its commentaries. They also gifted books to their subscribers. In 1885, when Desai announced to gift his much discussed political novel Hind ane Britannia to each subscriber, the number swelled from 850–900 to 2500 subscribers. The weekly continued its publication between the financial distress and political interventions. After death of Desai, his elder son Manilal Desai edited the weekly. It published its last issue on 15 December 1929. After a brief period, Desai's second son Natwarlal revived the weekly for brief period but it published only religious articles.

== See also ==
- List of Gujarati-language magazines
