= Nari Pratishtha =

Gujarati essay by Manilal Dwivedi (1884)

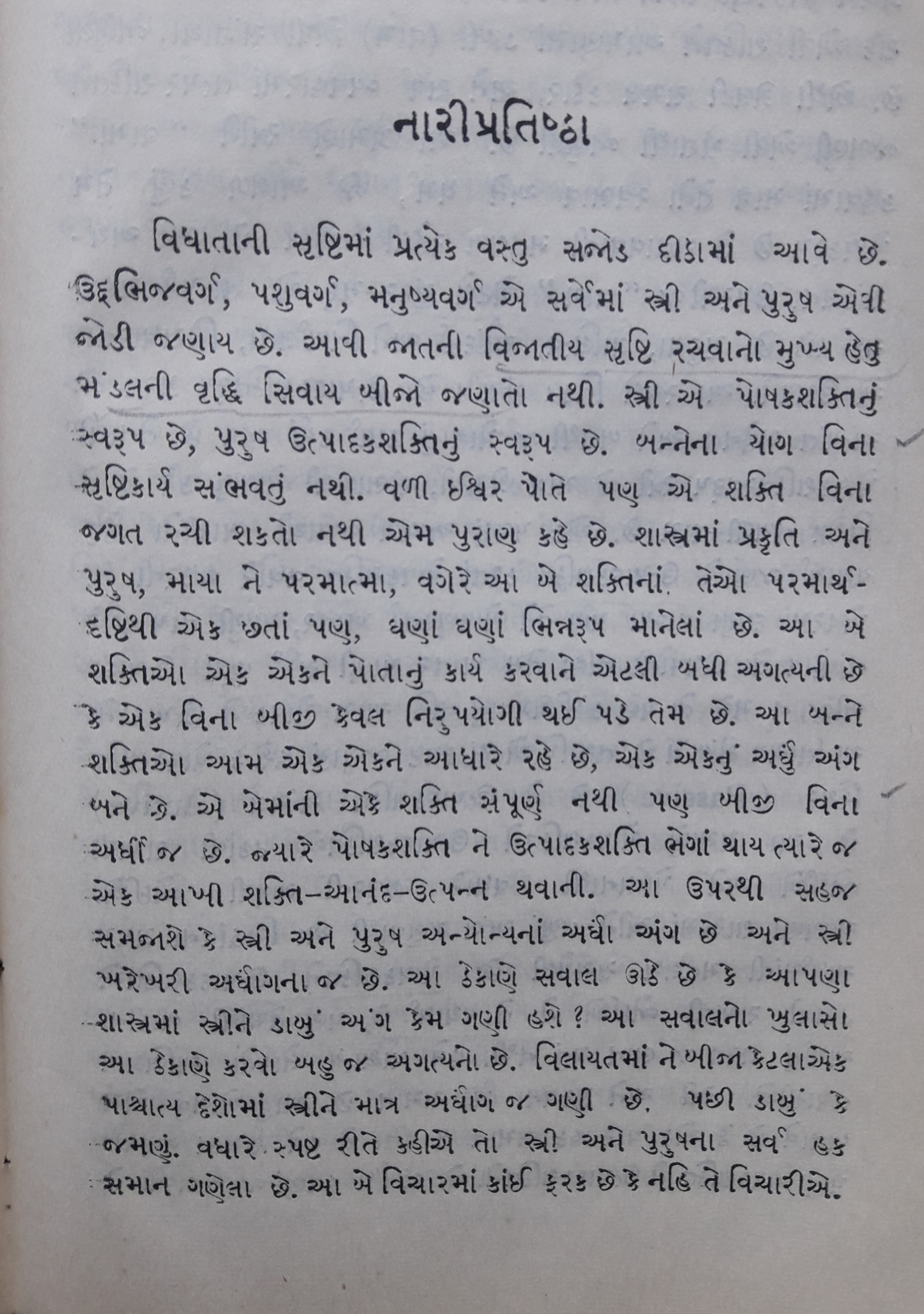
- First page of Nari Pratishtha; from Manilal Na Tran Lakho, edited by Dhirubhai Thaker
- Author: Manilal Dwivedi
- Original title: નારીપ્રતિષ્ઠા
- Language: Gujarati
- Genre: Essay
- Publication date: 1884
- First published in: Gujarati (weekly)
- Original text: નારીપ્રતિષ્ઠા at Gujarati Wikisource

Nari Pratishtha (pronounced [nari prʌtɪʃθa]; Gujarati: નારીપ્રતિષ્ઠા) (lit. Dignity of Woman) is an 1882 essay, published in 1884, by Manilal Dwivedi written in Gujarati which discusses the status of women in Hindu tradition. This essay is considered to be Manilal's most important work. With its publication, Manilal became one of the major Indian social thinkers of his time. It remains central to Manilal's ideas on social reform. All his other writings on the women's questions and the social reform movement use this text as a referent

Manilal, in his discussion of the place of women in Hindu tradition, adhered to the traditional view in some regards, and opposed widow marriages. This position generated considerable controversy.

== Background ==
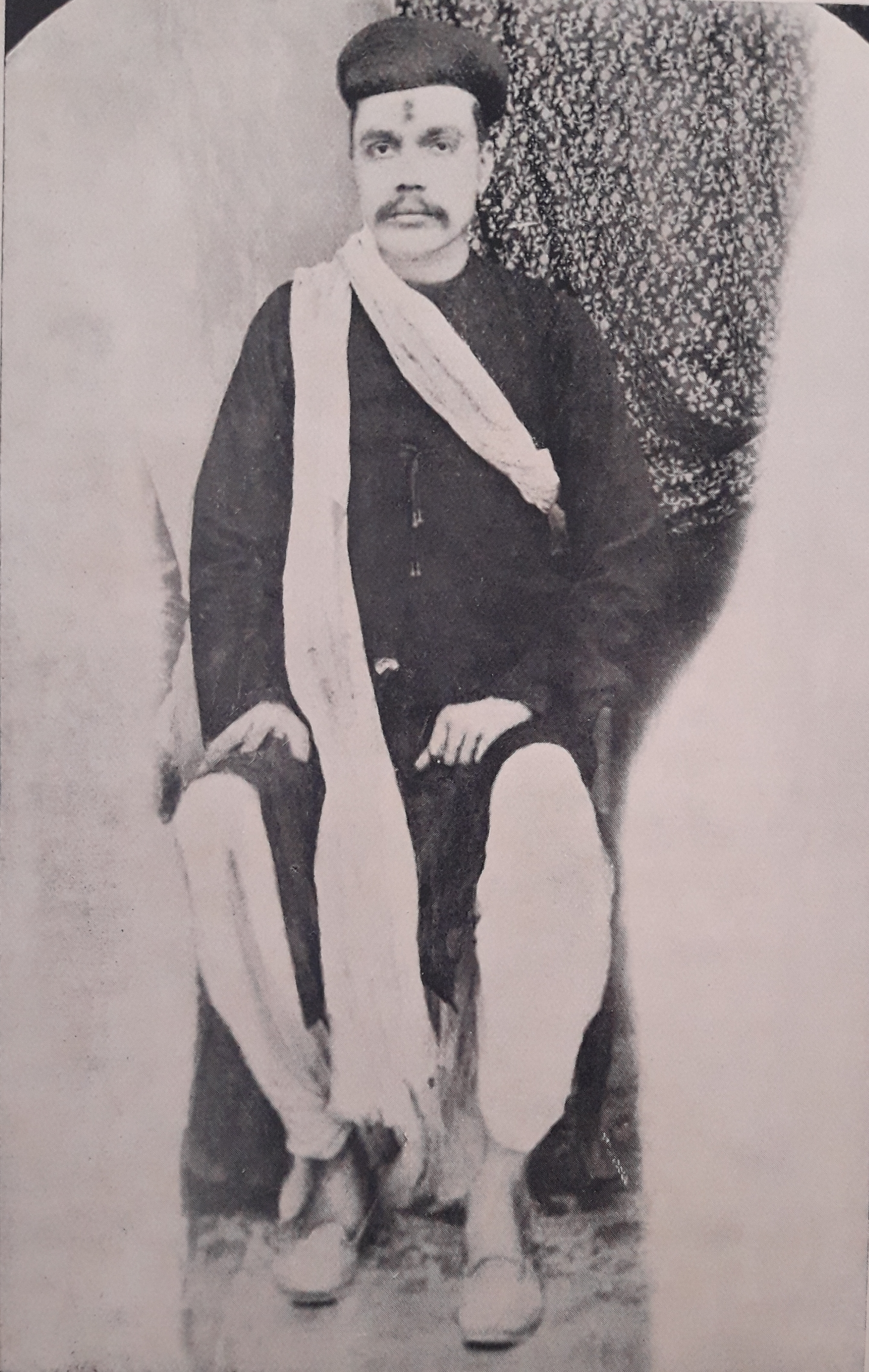
Manilal Dwivedi

Manilal had joined the Gujarati Social Union, a club for Gujarati graduates in Bombay, in 1882. Shortly after, during a meeting of the Union, the topic of widow remarriage was debated for an hour. The consensus of members was in favour of allowing widow remarriage, given their high level of education. However, Manilal voiced his disagreement. He analysed the subject in the light of the Hindu view of life in detail and argued with close logic against permitting widow remarriage.

The topic was discussed at length in a series of debates over the next month. These proved inconclusive, since no consensus over the issue emerged. Manilal noted in his diary that two people were won over to his point of view during this period. It was this extended debate which spurred him to examine various aspects of widow remarriage. The result of his meditations was encapsulated in his lengthy article Nari Pratishtha, which was not immediately published.

In 1884 Manilal was still resident in Bombay and was spurred to publish the essay after he came across and studied a copy of Auguste Comte's System of Positive Polity. In this work he found ideas similar to his own regarding women, and having absorbed Comte's views on the nature and role of women, he published his essay in the weekly magazine Gujarati the same year, in eight installments. With the addition of a further section written shortly afterwards, this was issued in book form in October 1885. In this Manilal stated that it was written while his attitude was influenced by Auguste Comte's positivism and Tennyson's Princess.

The essay was later published in the collection Manilal Na Tran Lekho (English: Manlial's Three Articles), edited by Dhirubhai Thaker and published by Gujarat Vidhya Sabha in 1954.

== Summary ==
The essay deals with the status of woman in Hindu tradition. The author deployed a number of stylistic techniques including rhetoric and polemic to reinforce his arguments. Manilal's thoughts on woman, marriage and family, as laid down in Nari Pratistha, can be summarised as:

- Men and women are two parts of an integral whole. Woman represents the left half, which according to Hindu scriptures is tender and weak. They are neither superior nor inferior, just different.
- Men and women should have separate spheres of work. This is because women have menstrual cycles. Employment outside the home should therefore be left to men. This is necessary in order to protect the purity of women.
- Women are more capable of love, affection and of being dutiful; three elements which Manilal deemed indispensable at a religious level if one is to achieve a sense of unity with the Supreme Being (Adwaita).
- Love is possible only between the opposite sexes because a woman will never compete with a man. A man should teach simple ethics to his woman.
- Women's education should focus on training them in love and duty. However, this orientation should not exclude them from also being taught languages, mathematics, science, history and similar topics, which ought to be objects of study for women. At the same time Manilal held that contemporary education was counterproductive because it did not respect caste differences and taught women English as well as a variety of social graces he considered to be superficial.
- At the time of marriage a woman should be 16 years old and a man 25 years old.
- A couple joined in love is undivided by death. With this premise, Manilal had to conclude that widow remarriage was sinful. Ideally, even a man should not remarry, but given women's superior capacity for love and affection, the obligation on them not to remarry was obligatory.

== Reception and criticism ==
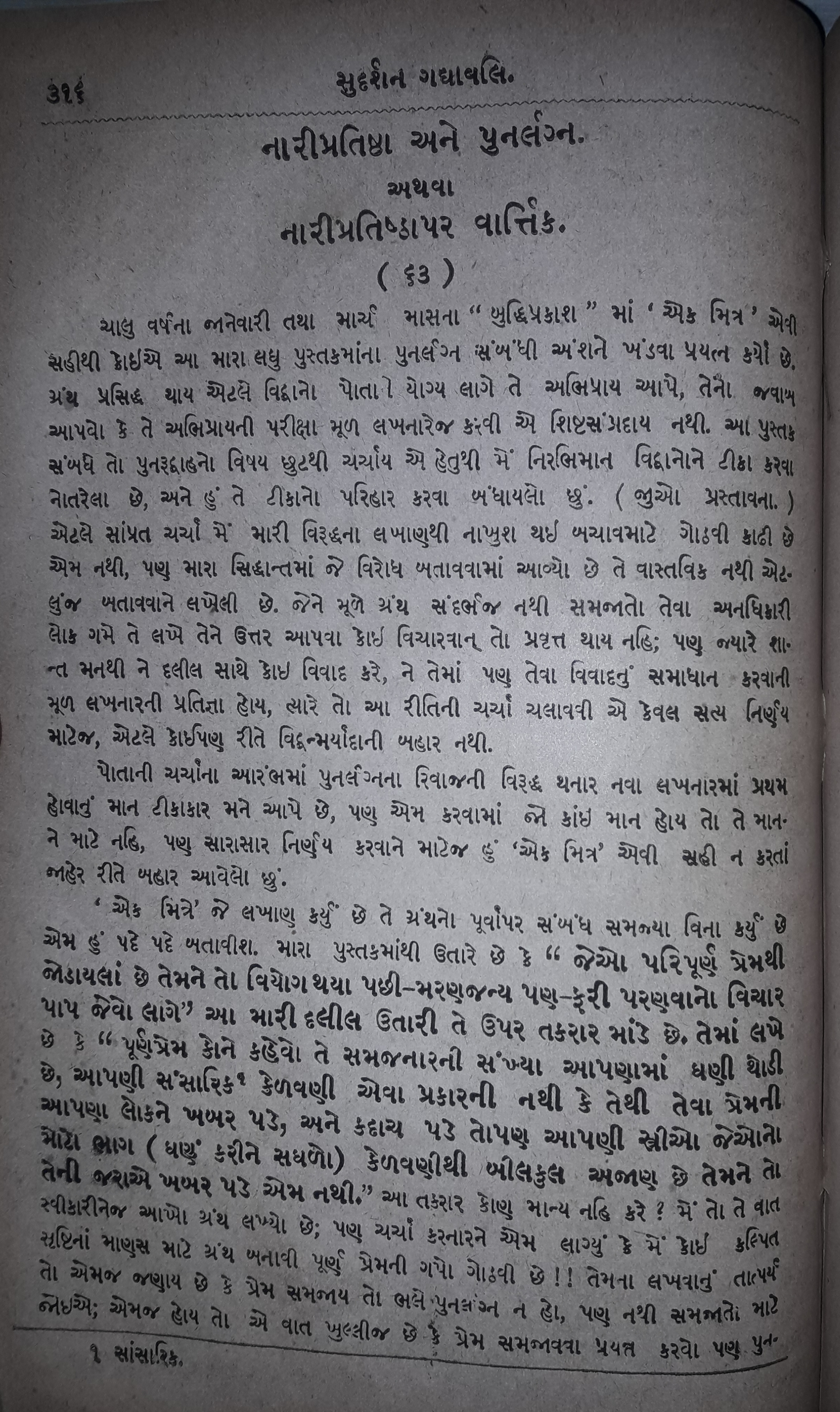
Manilal's response to the critical review of Nari Pratishtha written by an anonymous author

Nari Pratishtha is considered by critics to be Manilal's major work, and it made him one of the major social thinkers of his time. Nari Pratishtha remains central to Manilal's ideas on social reform. All his other writings on the women's questions and the social reform movement use this text as a referent.

After its 1885 publication, a critical review of Nari Pratishtha appeared in the January–March, 1887 issue of the Gujarati language magazine Buddhiprakash. The anonymous reviewer criticized Manilal, mainly on two grounds: firstly, that it is not sinful to remarry; and secondly, that the argument that love forecloses the possibility of remarriage is invalid.

Manilal responded to this criticism in the first issue of Bharatibhushan, a magazine edited by Balashankar Kantharia, writing that he had not suggested that widow remarriage is "sinful". He had, he claimed, suggested that a woman who is bound by love could find the idea of remarriage 'sin-like'. Explaining the difference between the two, he argued that those who are not bound by love may not find the idea of remarriage 'sin-like'. He stated that his tract was written for people who wished to understand the true meaning of marriage. Those who did not wish to do so, may well marry again. He had no objection to their doing so.

== Sources ==
- Suhrud, Tridip (1999). "Love, Desire and Moksha: Manibhai Nabhubhai and the Loss of Svadharma" (PDF). Narrations of a Nation: Explorations Through Intellectual Biographies (Ph.D thesis). Ahmedabad: School of Social Sciences, Gujarat University. hdl:10603/46631.
