= Manilal Dwivedi =

Gujarati poet and writer (1858-1898)

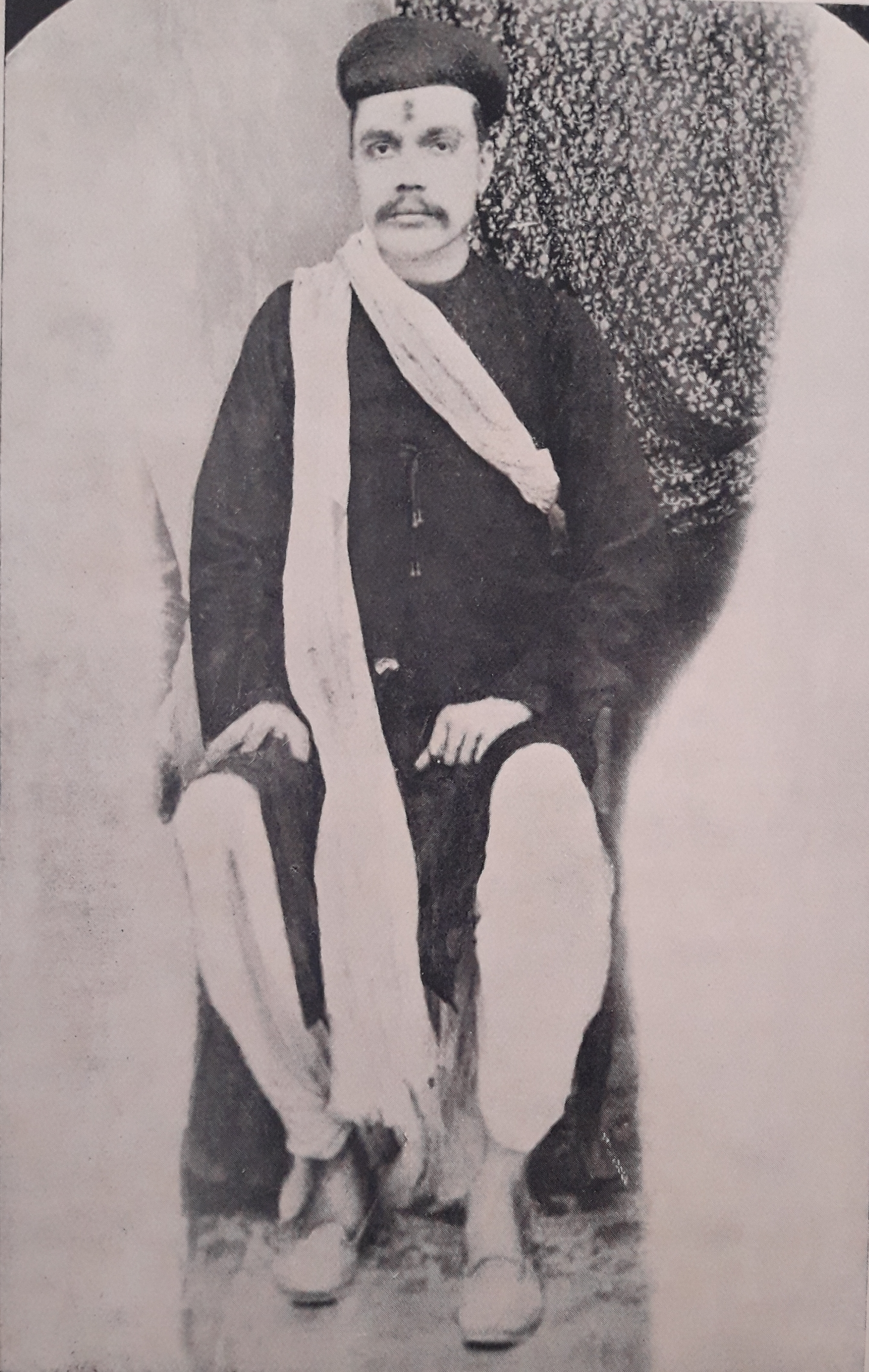
- Born: Manilal Nabhubhai Dwivedi; 26 September 1858; Nadiad, Bombay presidency, British India
- Died: 1 October 1898 (aged 40); Nadiad, Bombay presidency, British India
- Education: Elphinstone College (B.A.)
- Occupations: Writer; philosopher; social reformer
- Writing career
- Language: Gujarati
- Years active: 1876–1898
- Period: Pandit Yuga
- Notable works: Kanta (1882); Nari Pratishtha (1884); Monism or Advaitism? (1889); Siddhantasara (1889); Atmanimajjan (1895); Nrusinhavatar (1896); Gulabsinh (1897); Sudarshan Gadyawali (1909); Atmavrittanta (1979)

Manilal Nabhubhai Dwivedi (pronounced [məɲilal nəbʰubʰai dvivedi]; 26 September 1858 – 1 October 1898) was a Gujarati-language writer, philosopher, and social thinker from British India, commonly referred to as Manilal in literary circles. He was an influential figure in 19th-century Gujarati literature, and was one of several Gujarati writers and educators involved in the debate over social reforms, focusing on issues such as the status of women, child marriage, and the question of whether widows could remarry. He held Eastern civilisation in high esteem, and resisted the influence of Western civilisation, a position which drew him into conflicts with other social reformers of a less conservative outlook. He considered himself a "reformer along religious lines".

Manilal's writings belong to the Pandit Yuga, or "Scholar Era" – a time in which Gujarati writers explored their traditional literature, culture and religion in order to redefine contemporary Indian identity when it was subject to challenge from the influential Western model introduced under colonial rule. His works include Atmanimajjan, a collection of poems on the theme of love in the context of Advaita (non-duality) philosophy; Kanta, a play combining Sanskrit and English dramatic techniques; Nrusinhavatar, a play based on Sanskrit dramatic traditions; Pranavinimaya, a study of yoga and mysticism; and Siddhantasara, a historical critique of the world's religious philosophies. His faith in Shankara's Advaita philosophy provided the fundamental underpinning for his philosophical thought. He was invited to present a paper at the first Parliament of World Religions, held in Chicago in 1893, but financial considerations made his participation there impossible.

Manilal's beliefs led him to search for perfection and love in his friendships with men and women, though he was often disappointed by his experiences. He married at the age of thirteen and had two children, but his wife left him in 1890. He had multiple sexual relationships with women, and also visited brothels, where he contracted syphilis. He suffered from frequent bouts of serious illnesses throughout his life and died prematurely at 40. Narmad, the founder of modern Gujarati literature, considered Manilal his intellectual heir. Manilal elaborated upon Narmad's line of thinking through his writings in the monthlies Priyamvada and Sudarshan, which he edited from 1885 until his death.

== Biography ==
Manilal Nabhubhai Dwivedi was born on 26 September 1858 at Nadiad, Gujarat, to a Sathodara (Note: A subcaste of the Nagar Brahmin Hindu caste whose ancestors belonged to a village named Sathod (near Dabhoi).) Nagar family. His grandfather, Bhailal Dave, left eleven thousand rupees and a house to Manilal's father, Nabhubhai, who worked as a moneylender and sometimes as a temple priest. Nabhubhai had little education but desired that his son learn enough to work as a clerk, and therefore had him attend school from age four.

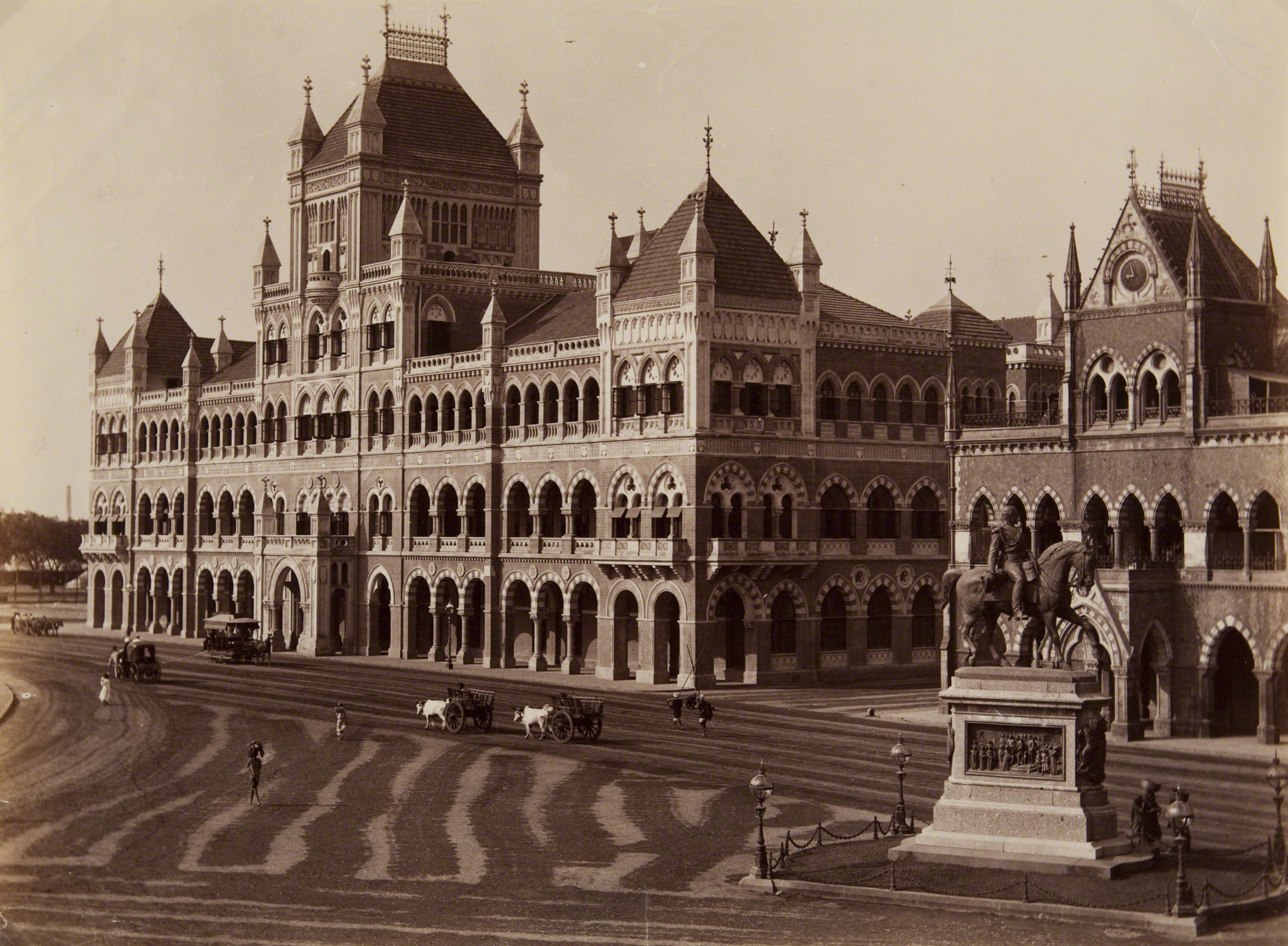
Manilal obtained his Bachelor of Arts from Elphinstone College in 1880.

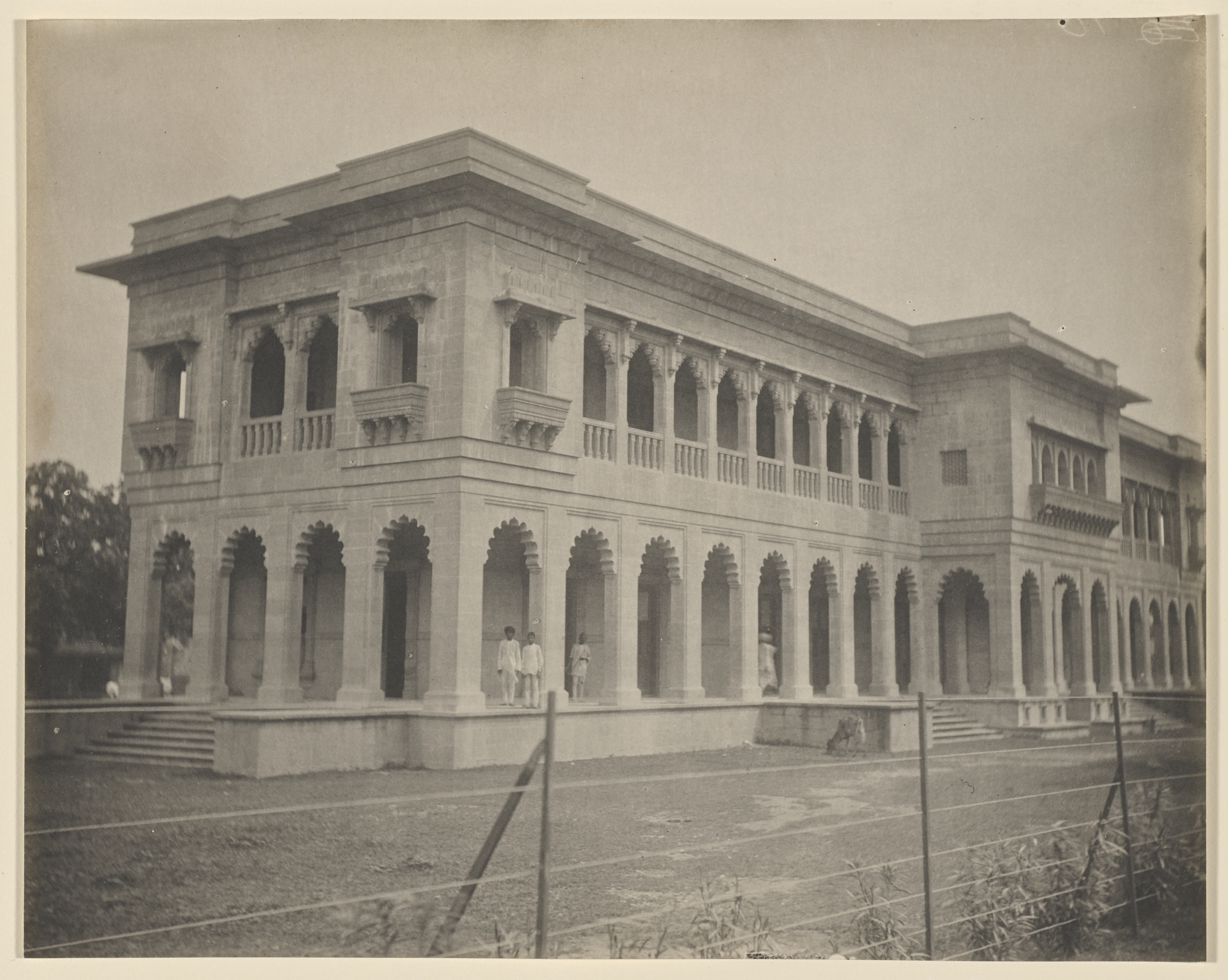
Samaldas College, Bhavnagar

He showed good progress at secondary school; he was ranked first in the annual examination of the second standard (Note: An educational stage equivalent to grade or year.) and won a prize. His teacher promoted him to the fourth standard, but Manilal was unhappy with the promotion and requested to be returned to the third standard. He was not proficient in Sanskrit and geometry, and failed Sanskrit in his matriculation examination in 1875. However, he was ranked second in examinations at Bombay University the following year, winning the James Taylor Prize. (Note: A prize awarded to the student scoring highest in the political economy and history examination. (University of Bombay 1880, p. 166))

He joined Elphinstone College in 1877 and graduated with a Bachelor of Arts in history and politics in 1880. Under pressure from his father to earn a wage, he left the college and completed his Master of Arts studies as an autodidact. He returned to Nadiad, and in July 1880, became an assistant teacher at the government high school. In 1881, he was transferred to Bombay as a deputy education inspector of girls' schools. He joined Samaldas College in Bhavnagar as a professor of Sanskrit in 1885 but retired in 1889 due to health problems. From November 1892 to July 1893, he stayed at Patan, Gujarat, preparing a catalogue of more than two thousand manuscripts from Jain libraries. This resulted in the establishment of the Baroda State Archaeology Department, which he headed from December 1893 to July 1895.

Manilal was a delegate from Nadiad to the Indian National Congress's Bombay convention in 1889. In 1890 he was elected as secretary of the Congress committee of Kheda district, and that year he was also hired by the Universities of both Bombay and Punjab to be a Sanskrit examiner for their BA and MA examinations. He retained both positions until 1892, and was chairman of the Nadiad Municipality school committee from 1891 to 1893.

Dhirubhai Thaker, a biographer of Manilal, noted that Manilal had an impressive personality and was tall and handsome in appearance. He habitually wore a long coat, a brahmin-style dhoti, a red turban and a long loose scarf hanging over his shoulders.

=== Personal life ===
In 1871 or 1872 Manilal married Mahalaxmi; he was then thirteen years old and she was four. She gave birth to two sons, one in 1882 and the other in 1887; but the marriage was unhappy and she frequently returned to her parents' house, leaving Manilal permanently in 1890. Manilal was obsessed with the idea of a perfect loving relationship, (Note: For "perfect loving relationship", Manilal used the phrase "Shuddha Premsthan", which Tridip Suhrud translates as "pure locus of love". (Suhrud 1999, p. 102)) and was demanding of his friends, expecting them to treat the friendship as more important than their other relationships. The resulting strain cost him several friendships. He was equally demanding of his women friends; in some cases the relationship included sex, though again he was often disappointed by the outcomes. While he was in Bombay, he fell in love with the wife of an acquaintance, and spent hours each day with her. He composed poetry for her, but gave up the relationship and left for Bhavnagar when he discovered he was not her only lover. Another affair was with Diwalibai, a teacher in a Bombay girls' school; Manilal initially rejected her but she persisted, sending him a series of love letters, and he finally wrote back, agreeing to a written correspondence. He refused to see her in person, however, and she died of tuberculosis in January 1886. Manilal's obituary for her in his magazine Priyamvada was unemotional, but his journal records his regret that he did not respond to her: "Fool that you were, you did not respond nor could you enjoy!". Diwalibai's letters were first published by Ambalal Purani in the November 1936 issue of Kaumudi, a Gujarati monthly. They were reproduced in Manilal's autobiography Atmavrittanta as an appendix.

In 1891, Manilal began an affair with Ramlakshmi, the wife of his pupil Chhotu, which lasted two-and-a-half years. He also had a brief affair with Chhotu's mistress, Ladi. In his autobiography, he admitted to having had sexual relationships with a close friend's wife, his wife's aunt, a woman seeking a job, a local woman, several prostitutes, servants, and the daughter of a close friend.

At this point I will state that the main quest in my life was to find a pure locus of love. If such a locus happened to be a woman, preferably a wife, so much the better. But if in the absence of a woman such an intimacy could be established with a man, that too suited my purpose. I pined for friendship only with this object in mind. In friendship I insisted that I must be the sole object of love. To me, love meant complete identity – identity that makes one forget one's own self and feel exquisite pleasure in doing so. I did chance to come across some women to satisfy my thirst for love – not for sex – but I was disappointed by both – men and women, in consequence of which my love turned into longing.

— Manilal Dwivedi, Atmavrittanta (1979)

=== Long term health problems and death ===
In his autobiography, Atmavrittanta, Manilal says that he visited brothels during his college years, and contracted syphilis as a result. As early as his first term there in 1877, he became aware he had genital chancres, but, unfamiliar with syphilis and its long-term effects, he failed to seek treatment as they healed on their own. Later, he suffered from a severe bout of rheumatism.

Four years later, he again began to suffer from penile ulcers, and by the following year, 1882, a rash of secondary syphilitic lesions erupted all over his body, with cysts forming on both his hands and feet. He put up with this painful condition for well over a year, and eventually gained a measure of relief. When the symptoms resurfaced in 1886, he consulted doctors who diagnosed him as suffering from tertiary syphilis. The advance of the disease caused an ulceration of his nostrils and sinuses, and further damage to his respiratory tract. Due to the corrosive effects of the infection on his tonsils and soft palate, he lost his ability to articulate and found it difficult to swallow food. He was treated over the following two years in Bombay and then Nadiad, and experienced a slight alleviation of his symptoms by 1888, after a successful operation for a plate implant. The operation enabled him to recover his speech and resume his job at Bhavnagar, though his painful nasal and throat ulcerations persisted and required follow-up treatment in Bombay. Manilal's confidence returned to the point that by January 1889, he felt sure a complete cure was possible, and indeed, by June, he experienced a notable improvement in both his general health and his speaking ability.

In September 1898, he developed jaundice and pleurisy. He died on the morning of 1 October 1898 while writing at his home in Nadiad.

== Philosophy and social reform ==
Manilal was an adherent of Advaitism, a Hindu philosophical school that considers only Brahman to be ultimately real. He believed that the self and God are not different in any way, and he argued that the Bhagavad Gita teaches this point of view rather than being a philosophical precursor of Advaitism. (Note: Thaker considers this a strained and unconvincing argument. (Thaker 1983, p. 43)) He believed that withdrawal from the world, as a religious practice, was wrong, and that instead one should fulfil one's duties, and sacrifice oneself for love of the world. Without a dualism between the self and the world, self-sacrifice becomes its own reward, and there is no expectation of a worldly reward: instead the soul receives "the joy of self-realization" in discovering that it and the world are not different.

Manilal's beliefs were the basis of his ethics and of his approach to the social reform questions of the day. By the late nineteenth century, a social reform movement was well established in Bombay and Gujarat, including early Gujarati writers such as Narmad, Dalpatram, Karsandas Mulji, and Navalram Pandya. Many reformers – the "modernists" – wanted to abandon traditional customs and adopt Western practices, these were "outer reforms", in Thaker's words, directed at such things as equal rights for women and the elimination of caste restrictions. Manilal was associated with the orthodox reaction to this movement, known as revivalists, who believed in "reforms along national lines".

Manilal was often critical of old customs, but he argued that true reform should not begin with simply abandoning Indian culture; his message, in the words of K.M. Munshi, was "No surrender to the West". Despite his vehement opposition to much of the social reformers' agenda, he considered himself to be a reformer – "a reformer along religious lines", since he believed that reforming religious ideas would lead to appropriate social reform. For example, he agreed with those arguing against caste-restrictions on social behavior, but did not approve of achieving this goal by concealing or lying about someone's caste. He argued that although the caste system was harmful, abolishing it without changing the underlying social attitudes would fail, as social discrimination would continue in a different form.

The difference between Manilal's approach and that of the modernists was apparent in the controversy over marriage customs in the 1880s. In 1885, Manilal published his essay Nari Pratishtha. In this essay, he opposed widow-marriage, which was traditionally forbidden even if the prospective husband died after betrothal but before the wedding, and argued that a woman who understood her moral duties would not wish to remarry should she become a widow. The reformer Behramji Malabari was attempting to move the government to legally establish an age of consent for women, and to legislate in favour of widow-remarriage. Manilal believed that marriage between Hindus was a religious, rather than worldly act, and hence the government had no standing to determine what was right. He and Malabari entered into a public disagreement on the issue which continued for six months in the pages of Advocate of India and The Indian Spectator. Malabari tried to persuade Manilal to give up his opposition to this; Manilal refused. A meeting of orthodox Hindus in the Madhav Baug (Note: A Hindu public space in Bombay that includes a Laxminarayan temple and other buildings. (Chopra 2003, pp. 418, 451)) which discussed some of these issues concluded that the help of the Government was not welcome with regard to marriage customs; an attempt to amend this statement to acknowledge that some changes to marriage customs were necessary, though the government should not be involved, was unable to gain support. Manilal defended the Madhav Baug meeting, arguing that it would be wrong for the government to enforce changes. Instead, Manilal found support for changes in the rules of widow-marriage in his reading of scriptures: by a controversial interpretation of a sentence from the Parasharasmriti, a work on legal code and conduct, he asserted that a betrothed woman who has not yet married can marry another man if her intended husband dies.

In Manilal's view, child-marriage was harmful but it was rare for the woman in such a marriage to actually go to her husband's household before puberty, and he felt that the reformers were exaggerating the problem in order to gain support. It was during the controversy over the Madhav Baug meeting that the case of Rukmabai became public. Rukmabai had been married at thirteen years of age, but had refused to live with her husband for nine years. Her husband filed suit to force her to live with him, and the Bombay High Court found in his favour; Manilal wrote articles attacking the reformist position, which further estranged him from the modernists.

Reformers such as Ramanbhai Neelkanth spoke out against Manilal's conservatism. Manilal criticised the Prarthana Samaj (Note: A movement for social and religious reform started in Bombay in 1867.) for importing the concept of God as a transcendental creator from Christianity, which, according to him, was "the fifth edition of Aryadharma (Indian religion)". On behalf of the Prarthana Samaj, Neelkanth entered into a seven-year dispute with Manilal on numerous topics related to religion, philosophy, social reform, education and literature. Their public debates, carried on in the pages of Manilal's Sudarashan and Neelkanth's Jnanasudha, are considered unparalleled in Gujarat's history of reflective literature.

Overall, Manilal was critical of both the modernists' approach and of cultural orthodoxy in isolation; he argued that "there is no antagonism between the Old and the New. Both are essential qualities – inherent in everyone. The world cannot go on if the two were not blended together". His unwillingness to support legislative reforms that did not address the underlying cultural and religious beliefs led him to be labelled as a conservative, despite his belief that the caste system, traditional marriage customs, and the inequality of men and women in Indian society were problems that needed to be resolved.

=== Social reform organizations ===
At the age of 15, he, along with his friends, started a small local group of Prarthana Samaj in Nadiad. In Bombay, he was associated with the Gujarat Social Union, an association of Gujarati graduates. He took a keen interest in mesmerism and occultism. He came into contact with Colonel Henry Steel Olcott, the first President of the Theosophical Society, and became a member in 1882, writing a series of articles on theosophy.

Manilal was the secretary of Buddhi Vardhak Sabha, a group of Bombay intellectuals interested in social reform issues that had been founded in 1850 but which had become inactive. Manilal relaunched it at the suggestion of his friend Mansukhram Suryaram Tripathi and the group's activities brought him in contact with Narmad, who later saw Manilal as his successor in the field of social reform.

== Works ==
Manilal's writings belong to the Pandit Yuga – an era in which Gujarati writers explored the traditional literature, culture and religion to redefine contemporary Indian identity when it was challenged by the Western culture brought by the colonial rule. His writing career began in 1876 with the poem Shiksha Shatak and continued until his death. He contributed to almost all popular forms and published poems, plays, essays, an adaptation of an English novel, book reviews, literary criticism, research, edited works, translations, and compilations. His autobiography was not published until 1979. His prose writings have been collected in Sudarshan Gadyawali (1909). He was an exponent of Advaita philosophy; throughout his life, he interpreted all aspects of human life and civilisation in the context of Advaita Vedanta, writing several articles and books on the topic.

=== Literary works ===
In 1882, Manilal published his play Kanta. A fusion of Sanskrit drama and Shakespearean tragedy, the play had the first tragic hero in Gujarati drama. Manilal wrote another play, Nrusinhavatar (1896), at the request of the Mumbai Gujarati Natak Company. It was based on Hindu mythological episodes, and was staged in 1899 after his death.

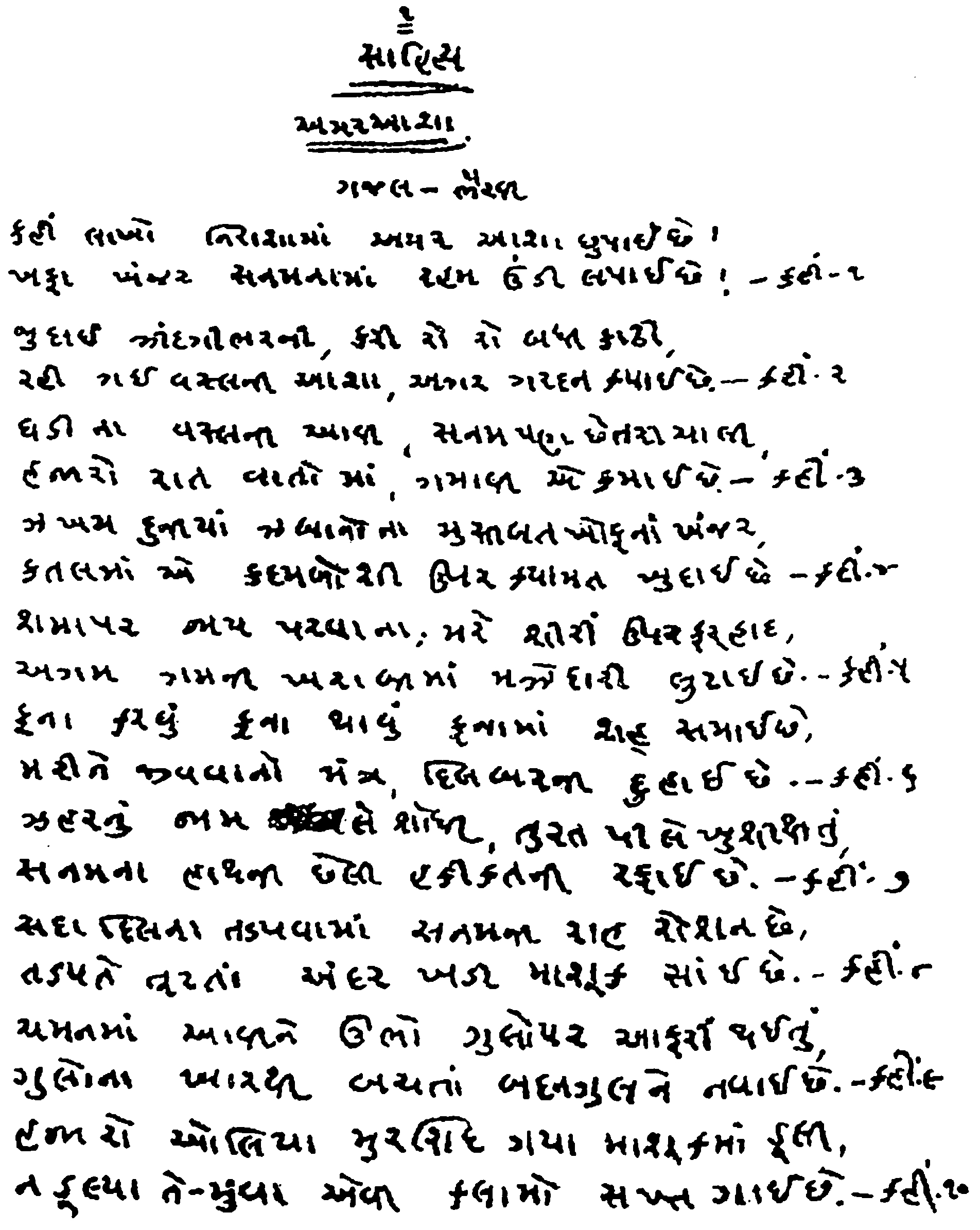
Amar Asha, a ghazal by Manilal Dwivedi, in his handwriting

Manilal based his poetry collection Atmanimajjan (1895) on his own experiences, with the theme of love. It largely consisted of ghazals in the style of Persian Sufis. Despite flaws of language, such as the misuse of Persian words, they were held to capture the spirit of the ghazal according to critic Mansukhlal Jhaveri. Through them, Manilal illustrated the concepts of the Advaita Vedanta, and expressed his disappointments and his cravings for love. His ghazal "Amar Asha" is popular in Gujarati.

He adapted Edward Bulwer-Lytton's novel Zanoni into Gujarati as Gulabsinh (1897). According to Thaker, "Gulabsinh occupies an important place in Gujarati literature as a unique adaptation of an English novel, and as a novel of occult interest and a rare love-story of a human and a superhuman character." It was later adapted into the Gujarati plays Prataplakshmi (1914) by Mulshankar Mulani and Siddha Satyendra (1917) by Chhotalal Rukhdev Sharma.

After his death, the manuscript of Manilal's autobiography, Atmavrittanta, was in the possession of Manilal's disciple, the scholar Anandshankar Dhruv, who never allowed it to be published for fear that it would damage Manilal's reputation. It was finally published in 1979, eighty years after Manilal's death. It created a stir due to its outspoken nature and its unreserved accounts of his moral lapses, including his extramarital sexual relationships.

=== Religious and philosophical writings ===
Manilal made Vedantic philosophy popular among the Gujarati community, examining the main features of Indian philosophy and of Hinduism. He imparted to Gujarati readers an awareness of the foundation of their religion and culture. He argued in his writings that the native culture of India was superior to that of the West. He was recognised both in India and in abroad as a staunch proponent of ancient Hindu traditions and as a learned Indian philosopher.

Shortly after moving to Bhavnagar, Manilal published a book in English entitled Raja Yoga (lit. 'King of all Yogas'), in 1885. This reproduced a lecture he had delivered on the topic of 'The Logic of Commonsense', together with an introduction to theosophist Tookaram Tatya's English version of the Bhagavad Gita. The book also contained his English versions of the Vakyasudha and the Aparokshanubhuti. The English orientalist Edwin Arnold, who met with Manilal in Bhavnagar and conversed with him at length, admired the book for its content and clarity. (Note: Arnold wrote in his book, India Revisited (1886): "Nor does Poona or Bombay contain any Shastree, with clearer conclusions on Hindu theology and philosophy, better command of lucid language, or ideas more enlightened and profound than Mr. Manilal Nabhubhai Dwivedi... whose book just published on the Raja Yoga ought to become widely known in Europe and to converse with whom has been a real privilege" (Thaker 1983, p. 25, Arnold 1886, p. 106).) Shortly after its publication, Manilal received a letter inviting him to speak in the 7th Oriental Congress in Vienna, which was to be held in December 1886. However, the political agent of Saurashtra decided to replace Manilal with another candidate, R. G. Bhandarkar. Manilal wrote two articles for later Oriental Congresses: the first on The Purans (Philosophy verses Symbology), which was written for the 8th Oriental Congress held in Stockholm in 1889; and another on Jain philosophy for the 9th Oriental Congress held in London in 1892. He was awarded a certificate of merit for the second article.

Manilal wrote two books intended as a response to the Westernised reformist movement of his age. The first, Pranavinimaya, contained practical expressions of spiritualism according to Hindu philosophy. It was written from 2 August to 9 September 1888 and published in December. It addresses mesmerism and presents a study of yoga and mysticism; it attempts to establish a similarity between mesmerism and yoga, and to establish the superiority of spiritualism over materialism.

The second book, Siddhantasara, was a discourse on the theoretical aspects of Advaita philosophy in the context of other world religions. Manilal began writing it shortly after Pranavinimaya, though his work was delayed by illness. It was completed in March 1889 and published in June. It outlines the development of Indian philosophy and makes a case for the superiority of Advaita philosophy over all other religious philosophies. It created prolonged controversy; many were particularly critical of what they regarded as logical lapses and inconsistencies in Manilal's arguments.

He was invited to present a paper at the first Parliament of World Religions, held in Chicago in 1893, but he could not afford to go. His paper on Hinduism was read there by Virchand Gandhi. Manilal wrote several books in English which were well received in India, Europe and America, including Monism or Advaitism? (1889) and Advaita Philosophy. He published an anthology of the aphorisms of Vedanta under the title The Imitation of Shankara (1895), with simultaneous publication in Gujarati as Panchashati.

=== Social reform and educational writings ===
In 1884, Manilal published Nari Pratishtha in eight installments in the weekly periodical Gujarati. It was republished, with additions, in book form in 1885. It deals with the status of women in Hindu tradition, and lays out Manilal's beliefs: in his view women were more capable of love and more dutiful than men, and that should be the focus of their education, though he also believed they should be taught subjects such as science and history. He believed that "a couple joined in love is undivided by death", so he considered widow remarriage a sin. He was opposed to teaching women English, and he believed that women's menstruation meant that they should not work outside the home.

In 1885, Manilal founded and edited a magazine called Priyamvada to discuss the problems faced by Indian womanhood. At the time, most Gujarati women were uneducated, and the magazine did not draw the response he had hoped for from the women's community, so in 1890 he renamed it Sudarshan, and made it wider in scope. He elaborated upon Narmad's line of thinking through his writings in these magazines which he edited until his death. Sudarshan Gadyawali (1909) collects these articles, which cover subjects such as religion, education, sociology, economics, politics, literature and music. According to Jhaveri, with these magazines, Manilal emerged as the acknowledged master of Gujarati prose. Bal Vilas (1897) is a collection of Manilal's essays on religion and morality, written for schoolgirls.

=== Translations ===
Manilal translated the Sanskrit plays Malatimadhava and Uttararamacarita by Bhavabhuti into Gujarati. Of these, Uttararamacarita was considered an excellent translation by Jhaveri. Manilal also translated Samuel Smiles's Character into Gujarati as Charitra (1895), and Samuel Neil's Culture and Self-Culture as Shikhsna ane Svashikshan (1897). He translated the Bhagavad Gita with commentary into Gujarati. He prepared with translation and notes the English editions of Patanjali's Yogadarshan and Mandukya Upanishad for the Theosophical Societies of India and America respectively.

== Reception ==
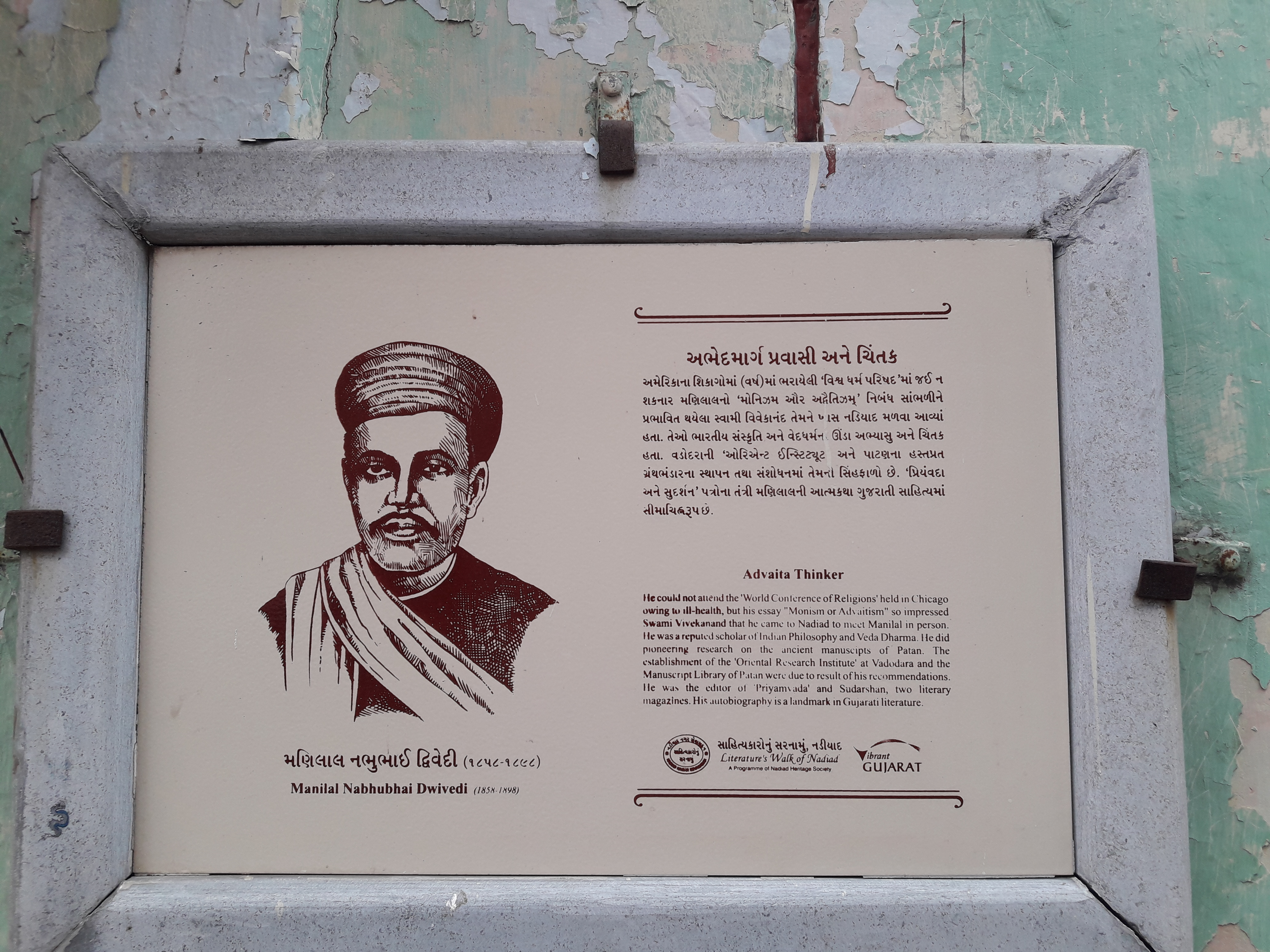
Plaque at Manilal's birth place

Manilal, along with his fellow Gujarati writer Govardhanram Tripathi, significantly contributed to Gujarati literature. The period of their activity (1885–1905) is recognised as the Mani-Govardhan Era rather than by a general terms such as Sakshar Yuga or Pandit Yuga. Anandshankar Dhruv publicly described Manilal as a Brahmanishtha (one who always keeps his mind fixed on the Supreme Brahman, the ultimate reality). Thaker wrote a biographical play, Uncho Parvat, Undi Khin (1993; 'Lofty Mountain, Cavernous Valley'), based on Manilal's life.

Manilal occupies a distinctive place in Gujarati literature. Throughout his life, he struggled at both a personal and public level to live up to the practical principles he elicited from his reading of the Advaita Vedanta tradition. His vision combined an ardent advocacy of Aryan philosophy with a Hindu worldview. He endeavoured to publicise his opinions to counteract what he saw as the blind enthusiasm of his fellow Indians for Western culture. Manilal thought that the non-dualistic philosophy of Advaita Vedanta, despite its complexity, contained important values which could inspire people to lead practical lives while remaining faithful to its ideals.

Mahatma Gandhi, during his first stint in gaol in South Africa in January 1908, read widely in the literature of Western writers such as Tolstoy, Thoreau and Emerson to enlarge his vision and, "among the masters of Indian philosophy", he turned to Manilal's book on Raja Yoga and his commentary on Bhagavad Gita.

== Sources ==
- Arnold, Edwin (1886). "A Model Native State". India Revisited. Boston: Roberts Brothers. pp. 99–116.
- Birch, Jason (December 2013). "Rājayoga: The Reincarnations of the King of All Yogas" (PDF). International Journal of Hindu Studies. 17 (3): 399–442. doi:10.1007/s11407-014-9146-x. JSTOR 24713650. S2CID 143065487.
- Chattopadhyaya, Rajagopal (1999). Swami Vivekananda in India: A Corrective Biography. Delhi: Motilal Banarsidass Publishers. p. 418. ISBN 978-81-208-1586-5.
- Chavda, Vijay Singh (1980). "The 19th Century Social Reform in Gujarat: A Contemporary Evaluation". Proceedings of the Indian History Congress. 41: 733. JSTOR 44141900.
- Choksi, Mahesh; Somani, Dhirendra, eds. (2004). Gujarati Rangbhoomi: Riddhi Ane Ronak ગુજરાતી રંગભૂમિ: રિદ્ધિ અને રોનક [Compilation of Information regarding professional theatre of Gujarat] (in Gujarati). Ahmedabad: Gujarat Vishwakosh Trust. pp. 117, 124. OCLC 55679037.
- Chopra, Preeti (2003). The City and Its Fragments: Colonial Bombay, 1854–1918. Vol. 2. Berkeley: University of California. OCLC 937449532.
- Choudhuri, Indra Nath, ed. (2016). Encyclopaedia of Indian Literature: I-L. Vol. 3. New Delhi: Sahitya Akademi. p. 2267. ISBN 978-81-260-4758-1.
- Dalal, Yasin (1999). Princes And the Press. Rajkot: Saurashtra University. OCLC 82772563.
- Dasgupta, Surendranath (1975). A History of Indian Philosophy. Vol. 1. Delhi: Motilal Banarsidass Publishers. p. 50. ISBN 978-81-208-0412-8.
- Datta, Amaresh, ed. (1988). Encyclopaedia of Indian Literature: Devraj to Jyoti. Vol. 2. New Delhi: Sahitya Akademi. pp. 1130–1131. ISBN 978-81-260-1194-0.
- Desai, S.D. (2002). More Happenings: Gujarati Theatre Today (1990–1999). Gandhinagar: Gujarat Sahitya Academy. p. 69. ISBN 81-7227-113-1.
- George, K. M., ed. (1992). Modern Indian Literature, an Anthology: Surveys and Poems. New Delhi: Sahitya Akademi. p. 126. ISBN 978-81-7201-324-0.
- Jhaveri, Mansukhlal (1978). History of Gujarati Literature. New Delhi: Sahitya Akademi. pp. 101–104. OCLC 639128528.
- Panchal, Shirish (1998). B.K. Thakore. Makers of Indian Literature. New Delhi: Sahitya Akademi. p. 5. ISBN 978-81-260-0373-0.
- Pandya, Ketki N. (2004). Tagore's Chitra and Aurobindo's Savitri: A Comparative Study. New Delhi: Atlantic Publishers. ISBN 978-8-126-90353-5.
- Parel, Anthony J. (1997). "Introduction". Gandhi: 'Hind Swaraj' and Other Writings. New York: Cambridge University Press. pp. xiii–lxii. ISBN 978-0-521-57405-1.
- Patel, C. N. (2000). Moral and Social Thinking In Modern Gujarat. Gandhinagar: Gujarat Sahitya Akademi. pp. 38–39. OCLC 297205718.
- Ram-Prasad, Chakravarthi (2013). "Dreams and Reality: The Śaṅkarite Critique of Vijñānavāda". In Perrett, Roy W. (ed.). Epistemology: Indian Philosophy. New York: Routledge. p. 231. ISBN 978-1-135-70294-6.
- Raval, R. L. (1987). "Reform Controversy and New Approach to Cultural Synthesis". Socio-Religious Reform Movements in Gujarat During the Nineteenth Century. New Delhi: Ess Ess Publications. pp. 185–232. OCLC 838404380.
- Ray, N. R., ed. (1981). Western Colonial Policy: A Study on its Impact on Indian Society. Vol. 1. Culcutta: Institute of Historical Studies. p. 382. OCLC 916707731.
- Shukla, Sonal (1995). "Gujarati Cultural Revivalism". In Patel, Sujata (ed.). Bombay: Mosaic of Modern Culture. New Delhi: Oxford University Press. pp. 88–98. ISBN 978-0-19-563689-5.
- Suhrud, Tridip (1999). "Love, Desire and Moksha: Manibhai Nabhubhai and the Loss of Svadharma" (PDF). Narrations of a Nation: Explorations Through Intellectual Biographies (Ph.D thesis). Ahmedabad: School of Social Sciences, Gujarat University. hdl:10603/46631.
- Thaker, Dhirubhai (1983). Manilal Dwivedi. Makers of Indian Literature. New Delhi: Sahitya Akademi. OCLC 10532609.
- Thaker, Dhirubhai (2011). Keṭalāka Sāhityika Vivādo કેટલાક સાહિત્યિક વિવાદો [Some Literary Controversies] (in Gujarati). Ahmedabad: Gujarati Vishwakosh Trust. p. 31. OCLC 741752210.
- Thaker, Dhirubhai; Desai, Kumarpal, eds. (2007). Gujarat: A Panorama of Heritage of the Gujarat. Ahmedabad: Gujarat Vishwakosh Trust. pp. 355–356. OCLC 180581353.
- Topiwala, Chandrakant; Soni, Raman; Dave, Ramesh R., eds. (1990). Gujarati Sahitya Kosh: Arvachinkal ગુજરાતી સાહિત્ય કોશ: અર્વાચીનકાળ [Encyclopedia of Gujarati Literature: Modern Era] (in Gujarati). Vol. II. Ahmedabad: Gujarati Sahitya Parishad. OCLC 26636333.
- University of Bombay (1880). "The James Taylor Prize". The Bombay University Calendar. Bombay: Thacker. p. 166.
- Yajnik, J. A. (1979). "Philosophy in Gujarati". In Bedekar, V. M. (ed.). Philosophy in the Fifteen Modern Indian Languages. Pune: The Council for the Marathi Encyclopaedia of Philosophy. pp. 74–103. OCLC 911837204.
