= Monism or Advaitism? =

1889 book by Manilal Dwivedi

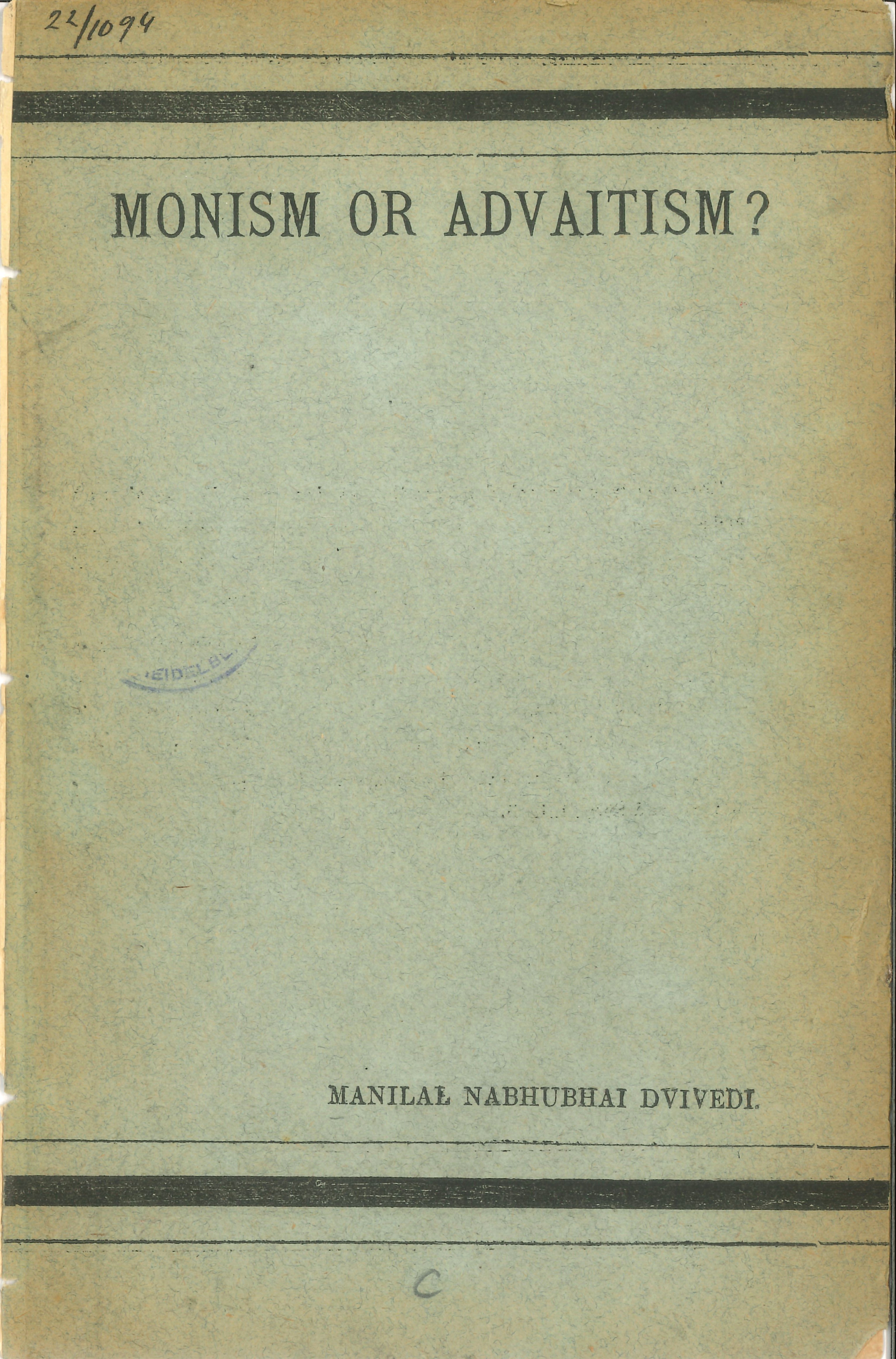
- Cover page of first edition, 1889
- Author: Manilal Nabhubhai Dwivedi
- Language: English
- Subject: History of philosophy
- Publisher: Subodha-Prakash Press, Bombay
- Publication date: 1889
- Publication place: India
- Pages: 104 pp.
- OCLC: 8346894

Monism or Advaitism?, published with subtitle An Introduction to the Advaita Philosophy read by the light of Modern Science, is an 1889 book of history of philosophy by Manilal Nabhubhai Dwivedi, in which author tries to compare the Advaita Vedanta, a school of Hindu philosophy, with the Western theory of Monism. It also tries to establish the superiority of ancient Indian philosophy over modern Western thoughts on the basis of the Vedas, the Upanishads and the Puranas.

== Background ==
In June 1888, Manilal's article on Advaita appeared in the Wiener Zeitschrift für die Kunde des Morgenlandes (Vienna Oriental Journal). Encouraged by the warm response it received abroad he decided to prepare a scientific treatise on Advaitism in English, comparing it with the Western theory of Monism. Within fifteen days he wrote out 100 sheets and sent the book to the press under the title Monism or Advaitism?.

Spanning 104 pages, Monism or Advaitism? was first published in 1889 by the Subodha-Prakash Press, Bombay, with subtitle, An Introduction to the Advaita Philosophy read by the light of Modern Science.

== Contents ==
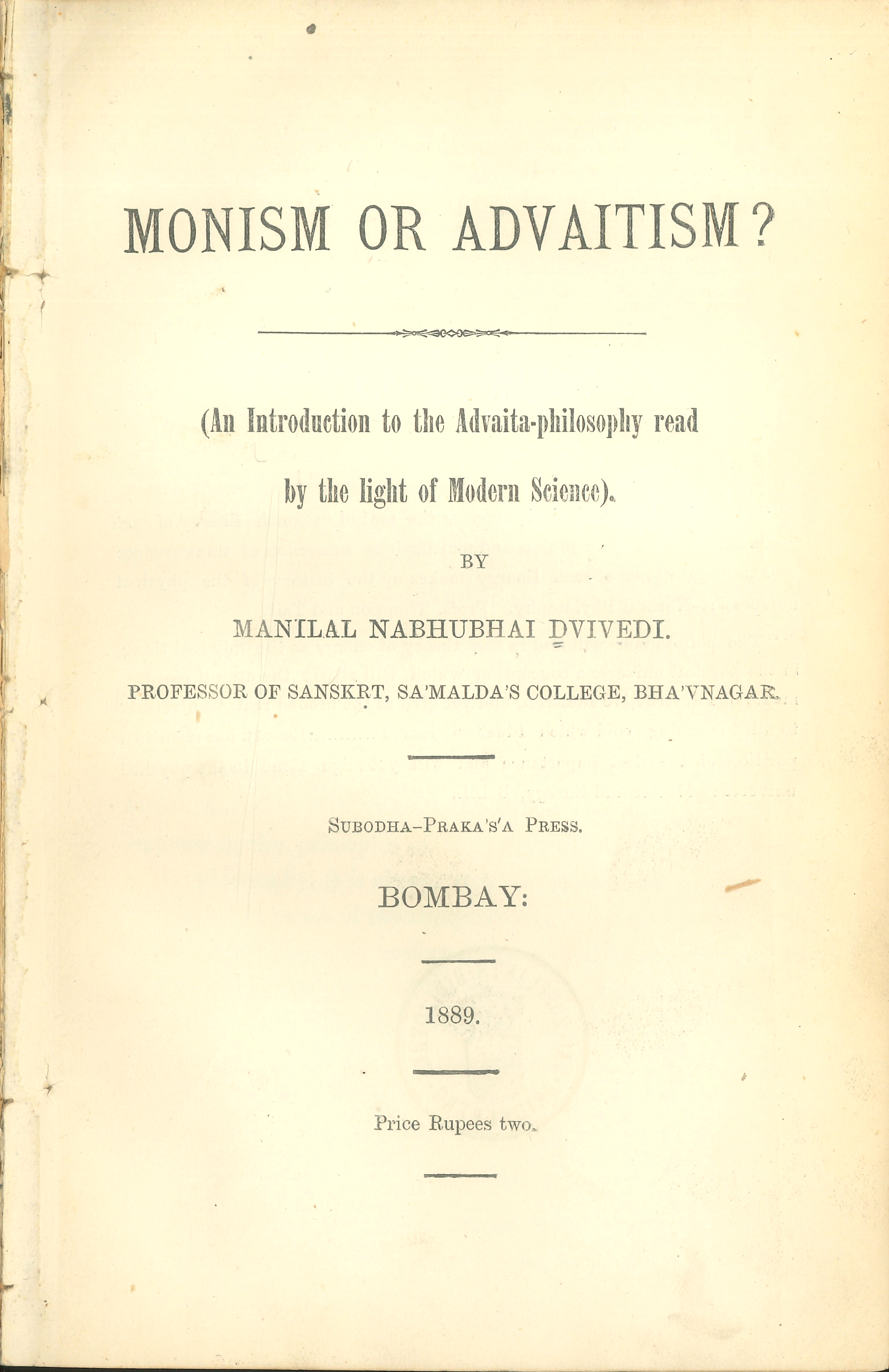
Title page of first edition, 1889

In the book, Manilal tries to compare the Advaita Philosophy with the Western theory of Monism. He pointed out that the principle of unity of nature was common to the Indian advaita and the scientific theory of evolution in the West. But, the former was far more advanced than the latter, which was only in the primary stage of speculation. Manilal hoped to establish complete identity between the two by comparing them.

Manilal analysed the principles underlying Monism and Advaitism and highlighted the essence of both by pointing out that the theory of evolution was based on the unity of nature and the principle of advaita aimed at the identity of all the elements of nature. According to him, the principle involved in advaita was, rationally speaking, more developed than that of Monism.

Manilal then proceeds to compare the concepts of God in the light of the two theories. He explains the Semitic concept of God implying duality between man and God, while the Advaita Philosophy posits the experience of identity between the two. In the experience of perception also, advaita asserts the identity of Agent (Karta) and Action (Karma) or that of the Seer (Drig) and the Seen (Drishya). Manilal calls the religion of Advaita philosophy as "scientific religion" because it signifies the culmination of human intellect in an extremely rational thought. The belief in a transcendent God could hardly accommodate science and scientific progress; but as he emphatically argues, Advaitism, which asserts the possibility of experiencing the one all-pervading brahman (the Ultimate Reality) offered an intellectually satisfying religion. In the terminology of Indian philosophy, Manilal calls these two approaches as Karma-marga (path of worshiping an omnipotent God) and Jnana-marga (the path of science or scientific religion).

The book was received well by western scholars.
