= Gulabsinh =

1897 Gujarati novel by Manilal Dwivedi

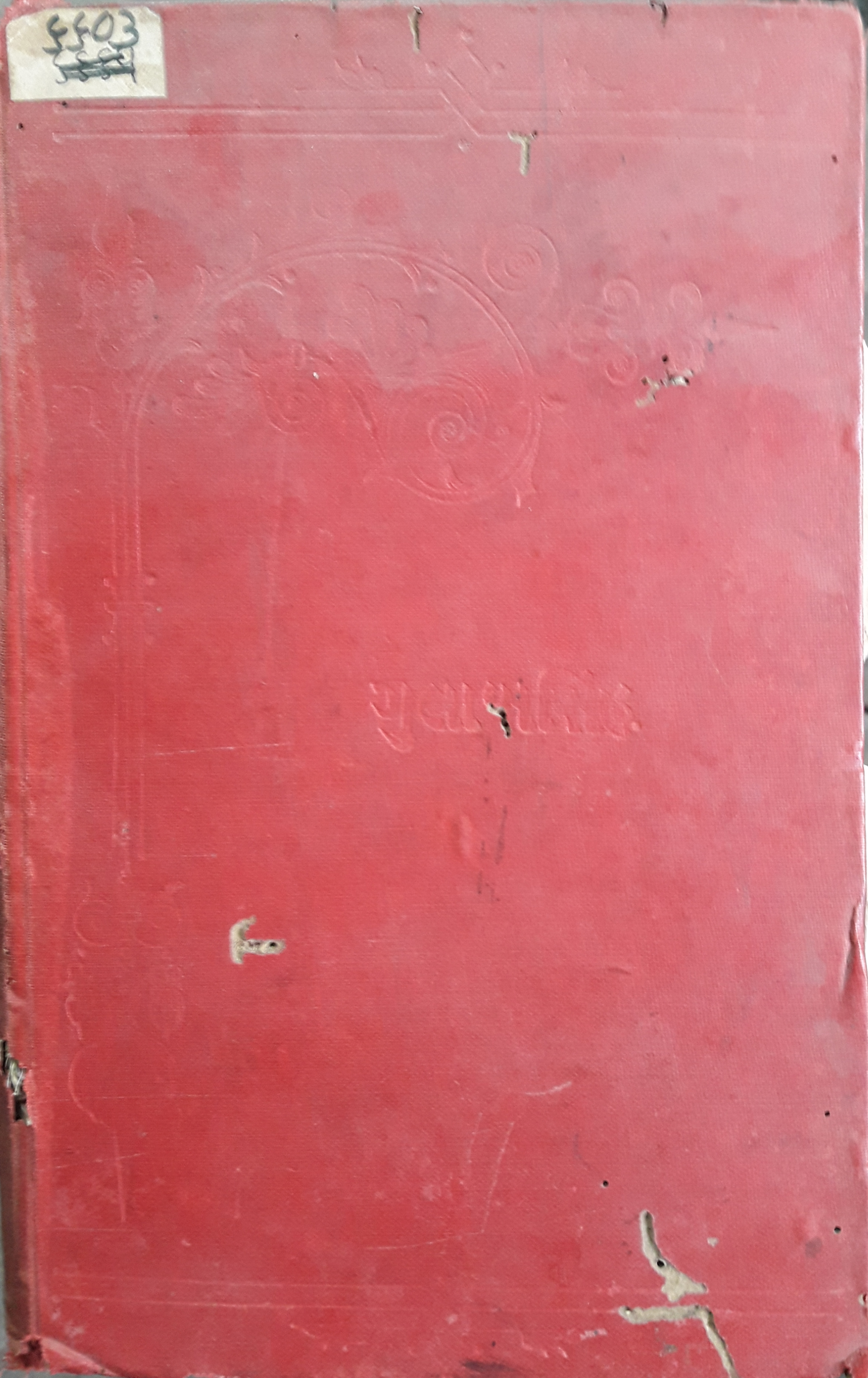
- cover page of first edition; 1897
- Author: Manilal Dwivedi
- Original title: ગુલાબસિંહ
- Language: Gujarati
- Genre: Supernatural fiction
- Publication date: 1897
- Publication place: India
- Dewey Decimal: 891.473
- Original text: ગુલાબસિંહ at Gujarati Wikisource

Gulabsinh (pronounced [ɡʊlabsɪnh]) is an 1897 Gujarati supernatural novel by Manilal Dwivedi (1858–1898), adapted from English writer Edward Bulwer-Lytton's novel Zanoni. It was serialised in Priyamvada (later Sudarshan) from the magazine's first issue in August 1885 to June 1895. Adapted into two plays (Pratap Lakshmi in 1914 and Siddha Satyendra in 1917), the novel – despite its flaws – is considered to have a significant place in Gujarati literature.

== Background ==
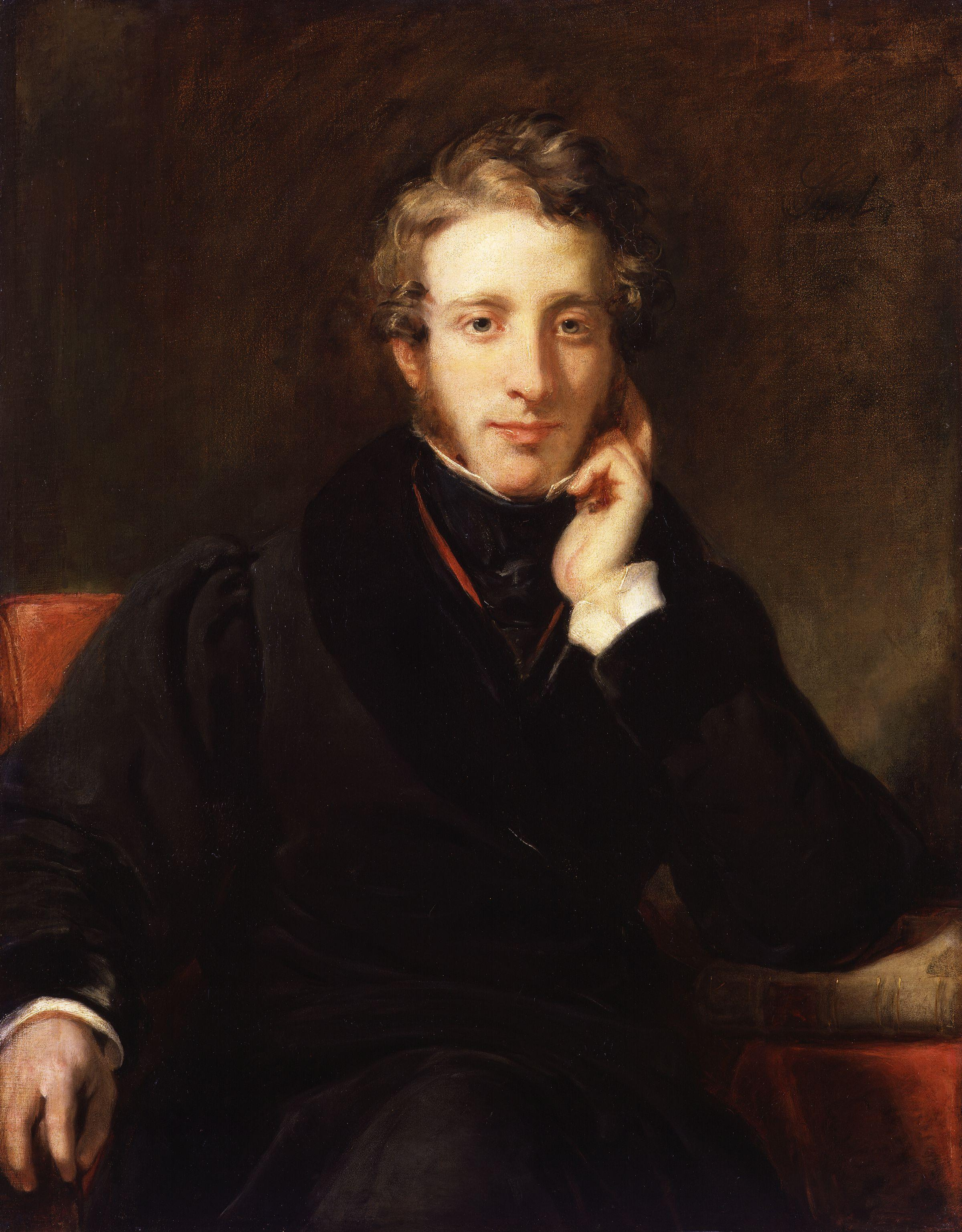
Edward Bulwer-Lytton

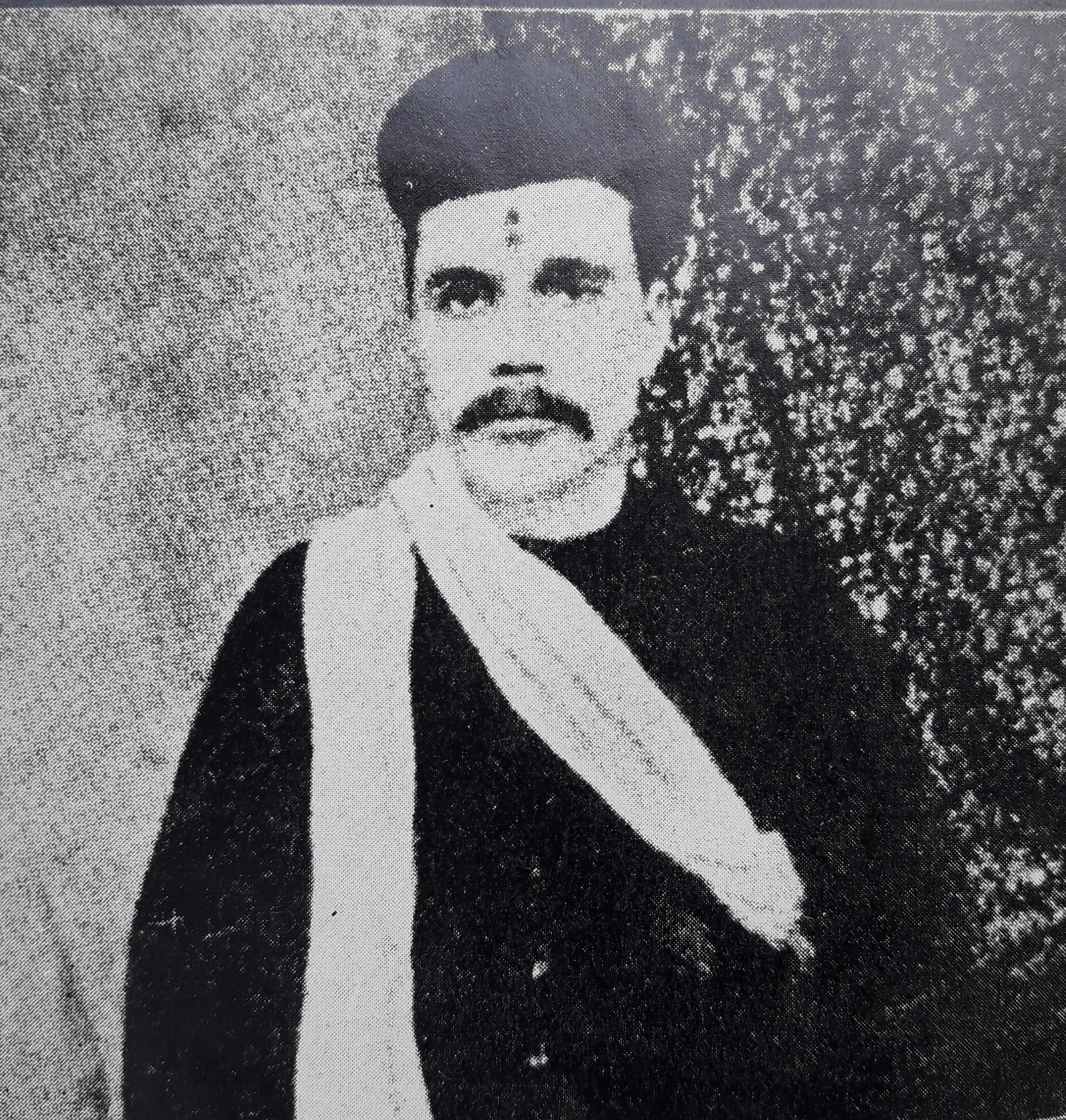
Manilal Dwivedi

When Dwivedi was developing his new monthly magazine, Priyamvada, he decided to include a novel which would provide a glimpse of spiritual life and pleasure to the reader. He selected Edward Bulwer-Lytton's English mystical novel, Zanoni for adaptation, since its mysticism impressed him. Although Dwivedi was aware of better novels, he considered Zanoni best suited to his purpose.

He adapted Zanoni into Gujarati, and began publishing it in Priyamvada's first issue (August 1885) as Gulabsinh. The series concluded in the June 1895 issue, and was published in book form in 1897.

== Themes ==
Gulabsinh is based on the ideologies of Mejnoor and Zanoni, the original novel's two main characters: ascetics who have acquired superhuman power by drinking an herbal elixir and are in constant communication with heavenly beings; Dwivedi calls the characters Matsyendra and Gulabsinh, respectively. Matsyendra is an illuminated ascetic (jnani) who is immersed in passive contemplation; Gulabsinh moves in society, and his purity of heart uplifts all who encounter him.

== Characters ==
The novel's principal characters are:

- Gulabsinh – the protagonist, who has supernatural power
- Matsyendra – an illuminated ascetic
- Rama – a dancer
- Lalaji – a painter, who loves Rama

== Plot ==
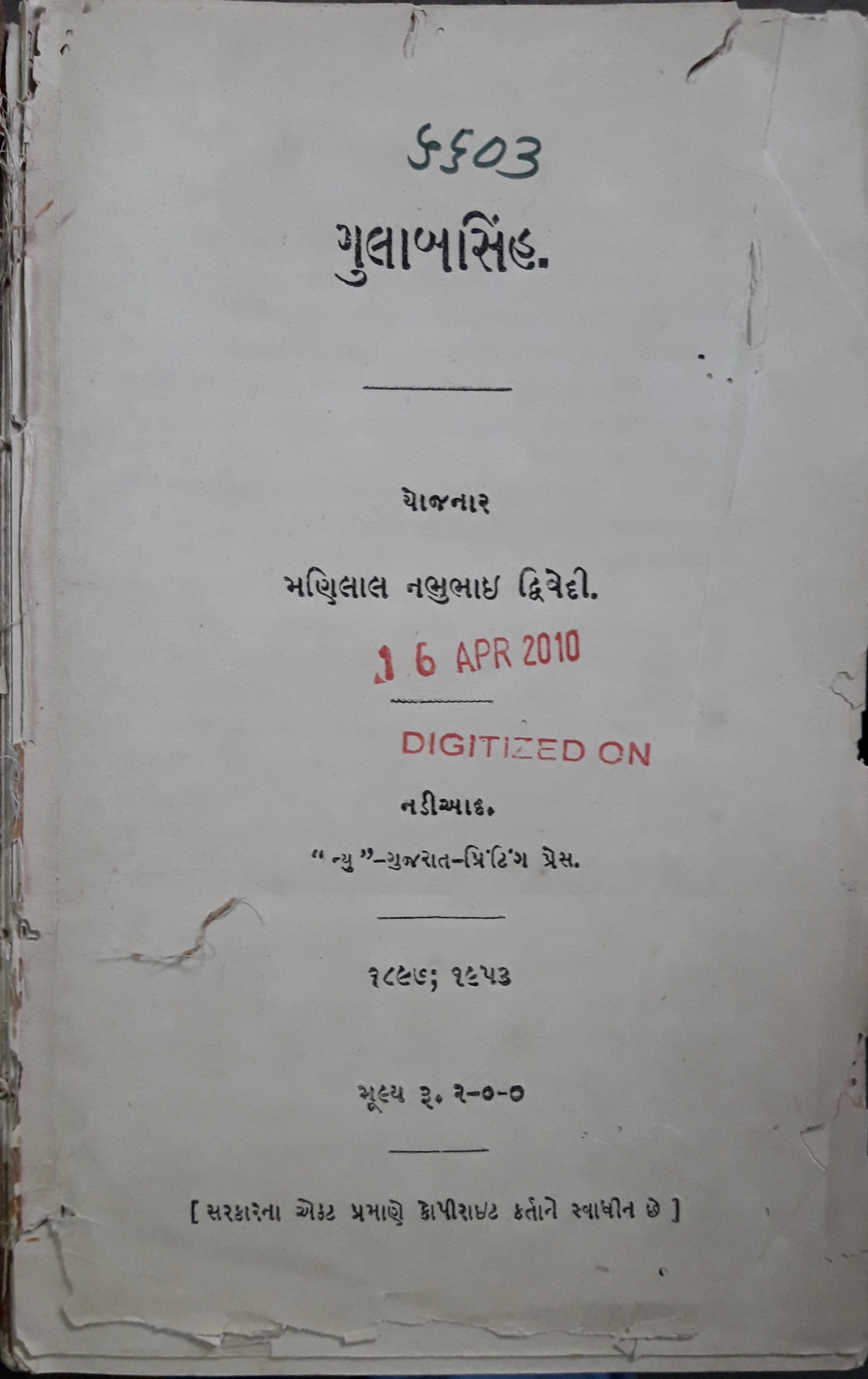
Title page of first edition

Gulabsinh attends a festival in Delhi, where he saves the dancer Rama from the clutches of a wicked nobleman with his secret supernatural power. He advises Rama to marry Lalaji, a painter who loves Rama but is reluctant to marry a dancer. Rama loves Gulabsinh, who inspires awe in her. Lalaji is attracted to Gulabsinh for his supernatural powers. Gulabsinh directs him to Matsyendra, and marries Rama at the cost of his immortality to save her. Matsyendra laughs at Gulabsinh and advises him to return to the seclusion of spiritual practice; Gulabsinh does not return, however, and allows his supernatural powers to disappear.

The Great Spirit explains to Gulabsinh the unequal status of the love between him and Rama, whom Gulabsinh unsuccessfully tries to uplift with his spiritual power. When he decides to unite his and Rama's souls in a third (their child), the heavenly being admonishes him: "Did you become superhuman only to become human?" Gulabsinh replies, "Ah! Humanity is so sweet!"

== Reception ==
Gulabsinh was adapted into two plays: Pratap Lakshmi by Mulshankar Mulani in 1914 (with Jaishankar Bhojak as Rama), and Chhotalal Rukhdev Sharma's Siddha Satyendra (1917). Navalram Trivedi criticized Gulabsinh's lack of readability due to its odd, metaphysical nature and its "literal translation" of Bulwer-Lytton's Zanoni, calling it a "superfluous adaptation" of the original novel. According to Anandshankar Dhruv, Gulabsinh is not a translation but a Gujarati adaptation of Zanoni; Dwivedi asked in the novel's preface that it be read as an imitation (Gujarati: anukaran), rather than a translation. Dhirubhai Thaker, Gujarati critic and biographer of Dwivedi, wrote that "Gulabsinh occupies an important place in Gujarati literature as a unique adaptation of an English novel, as a novel of occult interest and a rare love-story of a human and a superhuman character."
