= Siddhantasara =

1889 book of history of philosophy by Manilal Dwivedi

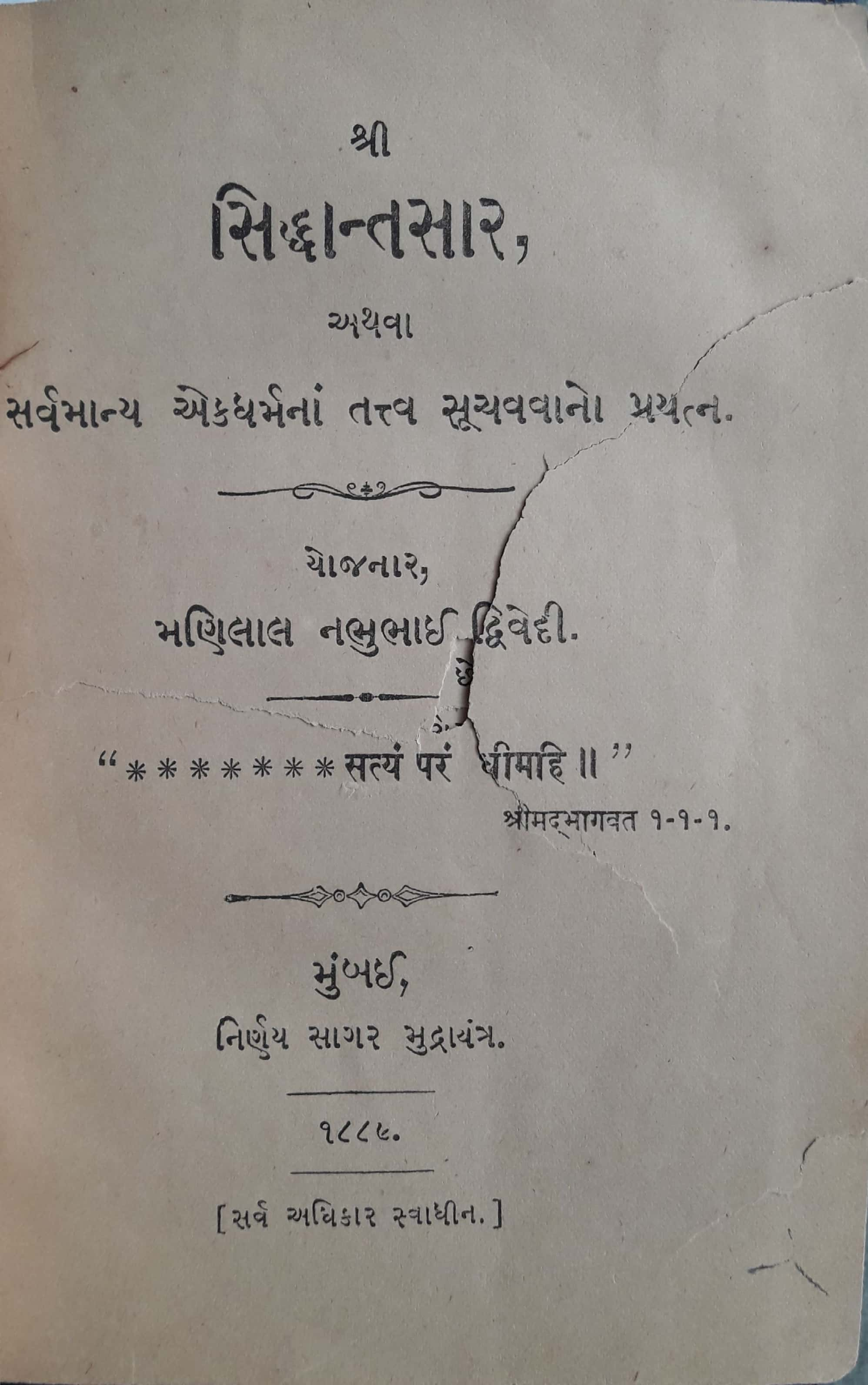
- Title page of first edition; 1889
- Author: Manilal Dwivedi
- Original title: સિદ્ધાંતસાર
- Language: Gujarati
- Genre: History of philosophy
- Publisher: Nirnay Sagar Press
- Publication date: 1889
- Publication place: British India
- OCLC: 20231887

Siddhantasara (pronounced [sɪd'ðantsar]; transl. The Gist of Principles) is an 1889 Gujarati book on the history of philosophy by Indian writer and philosopher Manilal Dwivedi. It is a historical critique of the world's religious philosophies. The book deals with the evolution of religious sentiment and attempts to establish the superiority of the Advaita philosophy over other religious philosophies.

Siddhantasara received positive reviews and became a landmark in the history of Gujarati literature but was also criticised because of the logical lapses and inconsistencies in the author's arguments. Manishankar Bhatt (known as Kavi Kant) published his review as a book titled Siddhantasaranu Avalokan (Analysis of Siddhantasara). Siddhantasara is considered by critics to be Manilal's most important work, and has been seen as a response to the cultural agenda and reform activities of colonial India at the time.

== Background ==
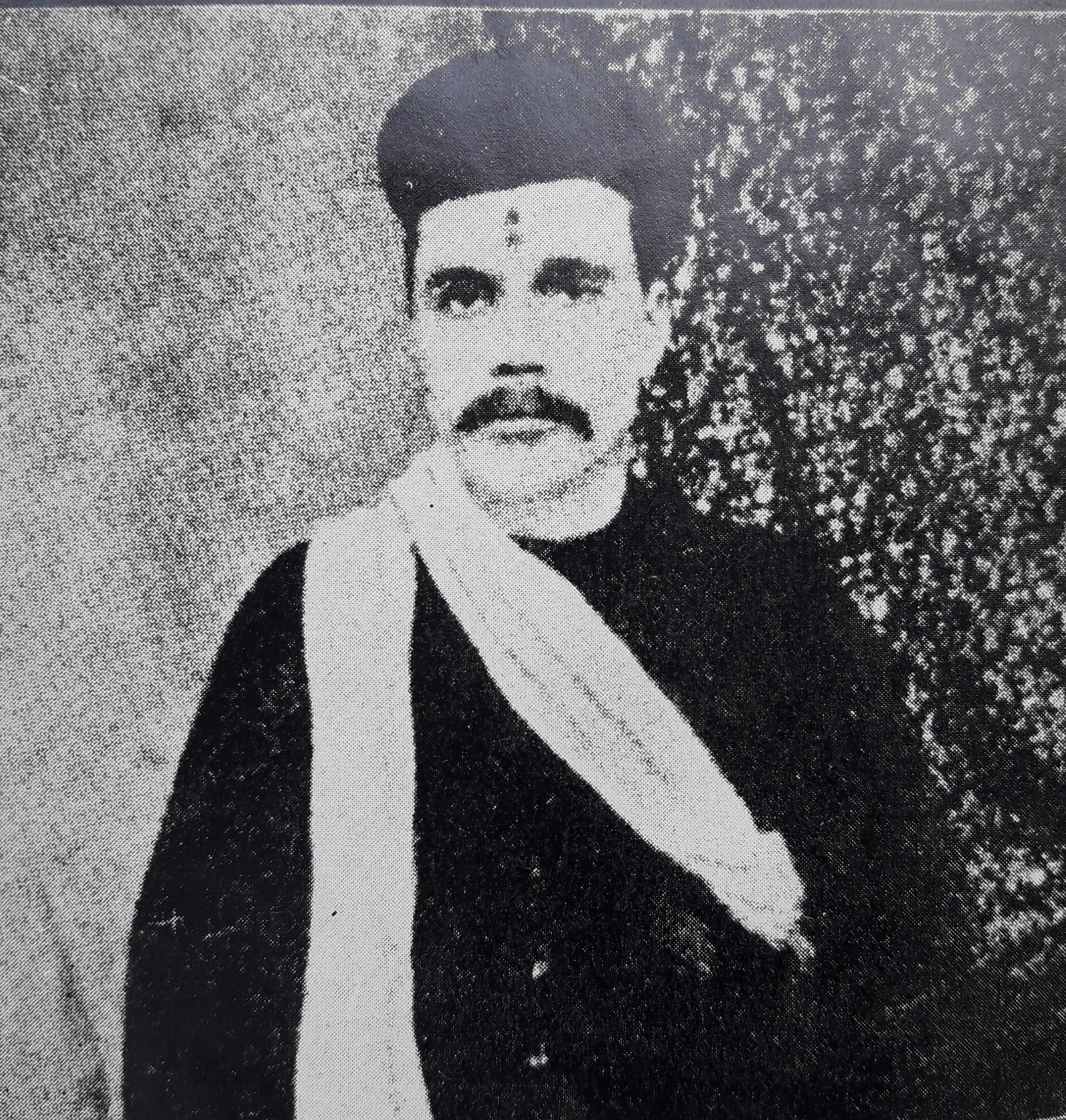
Manilal Dwivedi

In 1888, Manilal had planned to write two books in Gujarati. The first of these was a book expounding on practical expressions of Hindu philosophy. The second was a detailed treatise on the theoretical aspects of Advaita philosophy, in the context of a comparative study of Hinduism on the one hand and all other religions of the world on the other. On 9 September that year he finished writing the first book, called Pranavinimaya, and it was published in December. Pranavinimaya was based on mesmerism. On 5 October, Manilal began writing the second book, Siddhantasara. Progress was interrupted by illness, but the book was completed in March 1889 and published from Bombay in June 1889. The book had a subtitle Sarvamanya Ekdharmana Tatva Suchavvano Prayatna (Towards a Philosophy of Universal Religion).

In the preface to Siddhantasara, Manilal clarifies his aim in writing the book:

There are many systems of thought — like religion and philosophy — in this world, but I believe that all these are the transformations of the same eternal principles. The path of arriving at these eternal principles is the Advaita philosophy of ancient India. I believe that this needs no proof, as it is its own proof. My attempt here is to establish these principles.

— Manilal Dwivedi, 1889 (Note: English translation. Original statement in Gujarati: "વિશ્વમાં અનેક વિચારસંગતિઓ — ધર્મ, તત્ત્વવિચાર, ઈત્યાદિ — ચાલે છે, પણ તે બધી એક અનાદિ પરમ રહસ્યનું રૂપાંતર છે એમ હું માનું છું; અને એ મૂલ પરમરહસ્યને સમજવાનો સીધામા સીધો રસ્તો આર્ય અદ્વૈતદર્શન જ છે એમ પણ સિદ્ધ ગણુ છુ. અર્થાત્ આ વાત પ્રતિપાદન કરવા માટેજ મારો ઉપક્રમ છે...")

On the title page, Manilal described the work as "an outline of the history of thought in India terminating with an attempt to point out the basis of a universal religion". Manilal explained that his "attempt [was] to search for truth, which is not bound by any sectarian or ideological considerations", and suggested that this search for truth would be conditioned by his own beliefs.

== Contents ==
The book is divided into eleven chapters. Chapter One discusses religious ideas, and emphasizes the need for a standard religion acceptable to all. The final chapter presents a comparison of Indian and Western ideas on religion, and describes in detail the claim of the Aryan religion, based on Advaita philosophy, as the most acceptable religious philosophy. The intervening chapters present a history of Indian religious-philosophical traditions, including detailed discussion of the Vedas, the Upanishads, the Sutras, the Smritis, the Six Systems of Hindu philosophy, Buddhism, Jainism, Charvaka philosophy, the Puranas, and the Tantras.

In the first chapter, Manilal rejects the idea of the Genesis creation narrative as told in the Old Testament, and argues that the universe is eternal; that is, with neither beginning nor end. Manilal claims that the Vedas are the source of all religious ideas, wherein lies the origin of a universal religion. He claims that the Vedas were "divinely inspired" texts, and that they are therefore eternal. He attempts a logical explanation of the ritual practices described in the Vedas, their emphasis on Karma Marga, and their ideas of multiple gods and goddesses and of idol worship.

Manilal's theological conclusions are that Āryāvarta (ancient India) is the source of all religions; that Advaita Vedanta is the original and universal religion, with other religions as its mere derivatives; and that Advaita Vedanta is the supreme religion, in which lies moksha (emancipation).

== Methodology ==
Manilal seeks to demonstrate that, in their original form, all religions contain aspects of Advaita philosophy at their core. To this end, he presents the history of the world's religions and explores the characteristics of each. He attempts to explain the significance of old customs, and to prove that the myths and exaggerations of the Puranas are purposeful. In reply to Max Müller's criticism of the Puranas, he presents a detailed interpretation of the dashavatara of Vishnu (the ten incarnations of the Hindu god Vishnu) in the Puranas, rejecting Darwin's theory of evolution. As a metaphorical explanation of the relationship between the Vedas, the Puranas and the Upanishads, he writes: "The Vedas are the box of history of philosophical thoughts; the Upanishads are the key to open it to obtain the contents, and the Puranas are the lamps enabling us to see those contents fully."

Dhirubhai Thaker, Manilal's biographer, characterised Manilal's method as beginning with logical reasoning, which is then abandoned as the discussion proceeds in favor of an abrupt statement of personal conviction presented as self-evident. He writes that "there is a force of conviction in [Manilal's] style which is so vigorous that an average reader is not able to detect the gimmick, but it hardly escapes the notice of a critical reader".

== Reception and criticism ==
Siddhantasara is considered Manilal's most important work. With its publication, Manilal was recognised as one of the major philosophical and religious thinkers of his time. The work also generated prolonged controversy among intellectuals over the logical lapses and inconsistencies in the author's arguments. Most critics contend that, in his over-enthusiasm to prove a thesis, Manilal takes certain facts as self-evident, twists them to suit his purpose, presents evidence from obscure sources or, in the absence of evidence, resorts to sophistry.

The historian Vijay Singh Chavda wrote: "This work was the outcome of Manilal's long and thoughtful study of the fundamental principles of Sanatan Hindu Dharma and he placed them in their proper historical context". Thaker sees the publication of Siddhantasara as an event in Gujarat, saying that it corrected the impression among the educated class that the Puranas were merely fanciful stories. The cultural historian Tridip Suhrud sees Siddhantasara as an "interesting response to both the colonial cultural agenda and the reform movements".

=== Kant's critique ===
Gujarati poet Manishankar Bhatt (known as Kavi Kant) reviewed Siddhantasar at length. His chapter-by-chapter comments were published in Jnanasudha, a journal edited by Ramanbhai Neelkanth, from 1894 to 1896. They were written in the form of love-letters addressed by Kant to his imaginary beloved, Kanta. Through these letters, Kant exposed Manilal's verbal and logical gimmicks in a light, ironic style. Manilal responded to Kant's comments in his own monthly literary magazine, Sudarashan.

In June 1895, Kant met Manilal for the first time, by chance, at the residence of a common friend in Baroda. As Thaker notes, on that occasion Kant was influenced by Manilal's personality and philosophy. After this meeting, Kant's views underwent change. He ceased criticizing Manilal, and expressed admiration for him in his letters. In one letter, he wrote of Manilal's view of the Puranas:

His method of treatment is correct. He has been able to establish that the writers of the Puranas were, to large extent, conversant with the Vedas and the Upanishads, and that their objective was not to create superstition in the mind of the people, but to teach them truth of religion in a simple popular form.

In the final installment of his letters, which appeared in August–September issue of Jnanasudha, Kant wrote: "I respectfully welcome this work of Manilal despite several contradictions, much one-sided reasoning and similar other faults ... Speaking for myself, I look upon him as my guru for attracting my attention to several praiseworthy traits of our ancient religion". Kant's critique of the Siddhantasara was later published as a book entitled Siddhantasaranu Avalokan (Analysis of Siddhantasara).

== Sources ==
- Chavda, V. K. [in Gujarati] (1982). Modern Gujarat. Ahmedabad: New Order Book Company. p. 165. OCLC 9477811.
- Dash, Santosh Kumar (2010). "Hindutva and the Caste Archive: On the Question of "Hindu" Consciousness". In Achar, Deeptha (ed.). Discourse, Democracy, and Difference: Perspectives on Community, Politics, and Culture. New Delhi: Sahitya Akademi. pp. 309–341. ISBN 978-81-260-2846-7.
- Dwivedi, Manilal (1919). Siddhantasara (3rd ed.). pp. 4–5.
- Luzac's Oriental List and Book Review. Luzac & Company. 1891. p. 70.
- Suhrud, Tridip (2009). "Love, Desire and Moksha: Manibhai Nabhubhai and the Loss of Svadharma". Writing Life: Three Gujarati Thinkers. Hyderabad: Orient Blackswan. ISBN 978-81-250-3043-0.
- Thaker, Dhirubhai (1957). Manilala Nabhubhai: Jivanaranga મણિલાલ નભુભાઈ: જીવનરંગ [Biography of Manilal Nabhubhai] (in Gujarati). p. 150. OCLC 81126946.
- Thaker, Dhirubhai (1983). Manilal Dwivedi. Makers of Indian Literature. New Delhi: Sahitya Akademi. OCLC 10532609.
