= Nrusinhavatar =

Gujarati play written by Manilal Dwivedi

- First edition cover page, 1955 (published and edited by Dhirubhai Thaker)
- Written by: Manilal Nabhubhai Dwivedi
- Characters: Hiranyakashipu; Queen of Hiranyakashipu; Prahalad; Vishnu; Laxmi; Jay and Vijay; Shambuk and Hyagriva; Narad; Indra; Kashyap; Diti; Nrusinh
- Original language: Gujarati

Premiere
- Date premiered: 1899

Nrusinhavatar (pronounced [nrusĩhavətar]) is one of the two Gujarati plays written by Manilal Nabhubhai Dwivedi, the other is Kanta. Written probably in 1896, it recounts the puranic mythological tale of Nrusinhavatar. It was first staged by the Mumbai Gujarati Natak Company in 1899 but was unsuccessful. It was staged again in 1906-07 and became successful. It was edited and published as the book by Dhirubhai Thaker in 1955.

== Plot ==
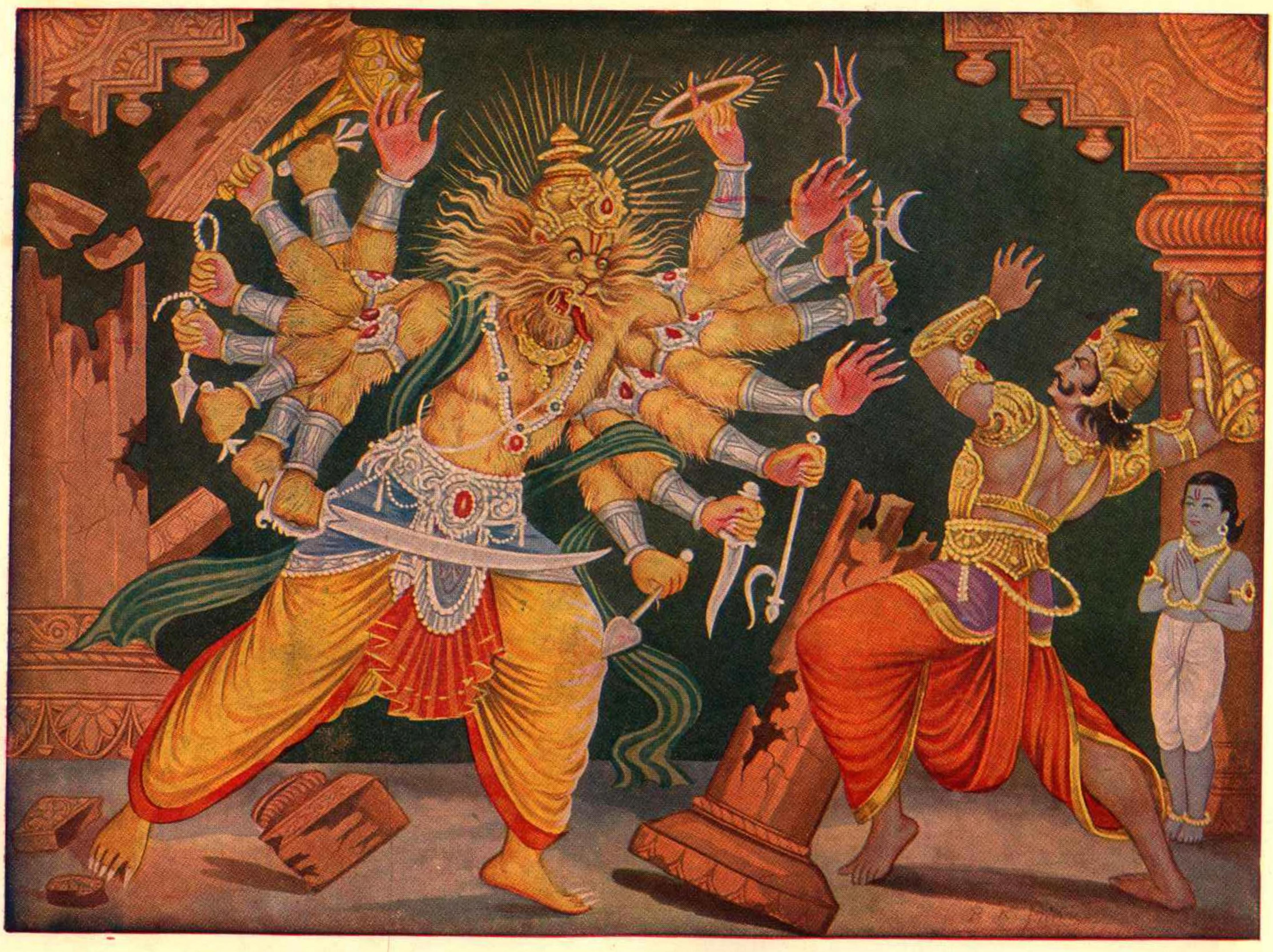
Hiranyakashipu (centre) wielding a mace against Nrusinh (left) and Prahalad stands praying. The mythological tale of Nrusinh, Hiranyakashipu and Prahalad is the source of the play.

Due to curse of Sanaka and others, Vishnu's gatekeepers Jay and Vijay are reborn on earth as Hiranyaksha and Hiranyakashipu to sage Kashyap. When Hiranyakashipu learns that Hiranyaksha is killed by Varaha incarnation (avatar) of Vishnu, he swear to take revenge. He went to perform penance to have a boon of immortality from Prajapati. Indra abducts his pregnant wife. Narad saves his wife and his son Prahalad and returns them to Hiranyakashipu when he returns. Prahalad is sent to study. He was an ardent devotee of Vishnu so he continues to chant Narayan (name of Vishnu) even after the prohibition by his father. Hiranyakashipu tries to kill him with various means but Vishnu saves him each time. At last he orders his on to embrace a hot iron pillar in the court but Vishnu appears in the incarnation (avatar) of Nrusinh from the split pillar and slays Hiranyakashipu.

== Characters ==
The principal characters are:

- Hiranyakashipu - The king
- Queen of Hiranyakashipu
- Prahalad - Son of Hiranyakashipu
- Vishnu - The celestial God
- Laxmi - Wife of Vishnu
- Jay and Vijay - Doorkeepers of Vishnu
- Shambuk and Hyagriva - Commanders of Hiranyakashipu
- Narad - Celestial being and the devotee of Vishnu
- Indra - Celestial lord
- Kashyap - Sage
- Diti - Mother of Hiranyakashipu
- Nrusinh - avatar of Vishnu

== Sets ==
- Forest, Vishnu temple, Ashram of Kashyapa, Parijat forest, court of Hiranyakashipu, queen's palace, square outside the palace, court of Indra, celestial space, forest
- Court of Hiranyakashipu, queen's palace, Ashram of Shukra, jester's house, Shukra's Ashram, private room of Hiranyakashipu, queen's palace, drawing room, queen's palace, forest
- palace, forest, mechanic's house, seashore, queen's palace, forest, Somdatta's house, queen's palace, court of Hiranyakashipu

== Theme and style ==
The play recounts the Hindu puranic mythological tale of Nrusinhavatar, an avatar of Vishnu with a picture of contemporary household. The mythological tale is taken from the Prahaladavritanta chapter of seventh book (skandha) of Bhagvata Purana. The character of a jester named Somadatt and his household is included for the public interest. The characterisation of the characters was praised by Dhirubhai Thaker for their diversity. The play is written in the style of the Sanskrit play having a prologue praising the deity, a stage-manager and the happy ending but also considering the public interest and the stage requirements. There is also an influence of English plays in theme of conflict, tragic characterisations and satire. The play focuses on devotional aspect. It has 64 poems including 35 songs. There are Sanskrit and Gujarati shlokas as dialogues in the play. Some songs including "Tum Tananan Harigun Gao..." and "Premkala Balihari" became very popular then. According to Thaker, the friendship of Prahlad and Devdutt included the play reflects Dwivedi's lifelong longing for a pure friendship.

Duty is a central theme of the play. All characters in the play are bound by their duty and are conflicted by their loves. The play becomes more intense as it progresses and culminates in climatic appearance of Nrusinh.

== History and reception ==
Following success of Dwivedi's play Kanta based Kulin Kanta in 1889, the Mumbai Gujarati Natak Mandali asked him to write another play. Nrusinhavatar was his second play written around end of 1896. (Note: The play is mentioned in his will dated 2 January 1897. So Nrusinhavatar must be written around the end of 1896.) It is believed that Dwivedi had made some changes in the play and its songs for the stage performance. He probably had discussed the changes with Dayashankar Visanji Bhatt, the director. Some songs were added in the stage adaptation by Vajeshankar Kalidas.

Nrusinhavatar was first staged on 18 February 1899 by the Mumbai Gujarati Natak Mandali, a year after the death of Dwivedi. It was commercially unsuccessful probably because its director and the actor playing the lead character of Hiranyakashipu were Parsis. In 1906–07, it was again staged by the Company and run successfully for around thirty nights. It starred Jaishankar Sundari as Laxmi, Bapulal Nayak as Vishnu, Prabhashankar Jagjivan 'Ramani' as Prahalad, Jatashankar Oza as Hiranyakashipu, Dayashankar as Kashyap, Jethalal D Nayak as Diti and Nannu Gulab Panwala as a jester. The first seven or eight shows were houseful and the Company earned the good amount of revenue. Jaishankar Sundari opines that it was one of the most successful devotional aspect focused plays. The success was attributed to mythological characters, use of local dialects, colloquy of jester and use of sarcasm by stage-manager who instigates quarrels in the play.

As the Company had bought the rights of the play including its publication rights for Rs. 500 from Dwivedi, it was not published for decades. It was finally edited and published as the book by Dhirubhai Thaker in 1955.
