= Priyamvada (magazine) =

Gujarati language magazine founded by Manilal Dwivedi (1885)

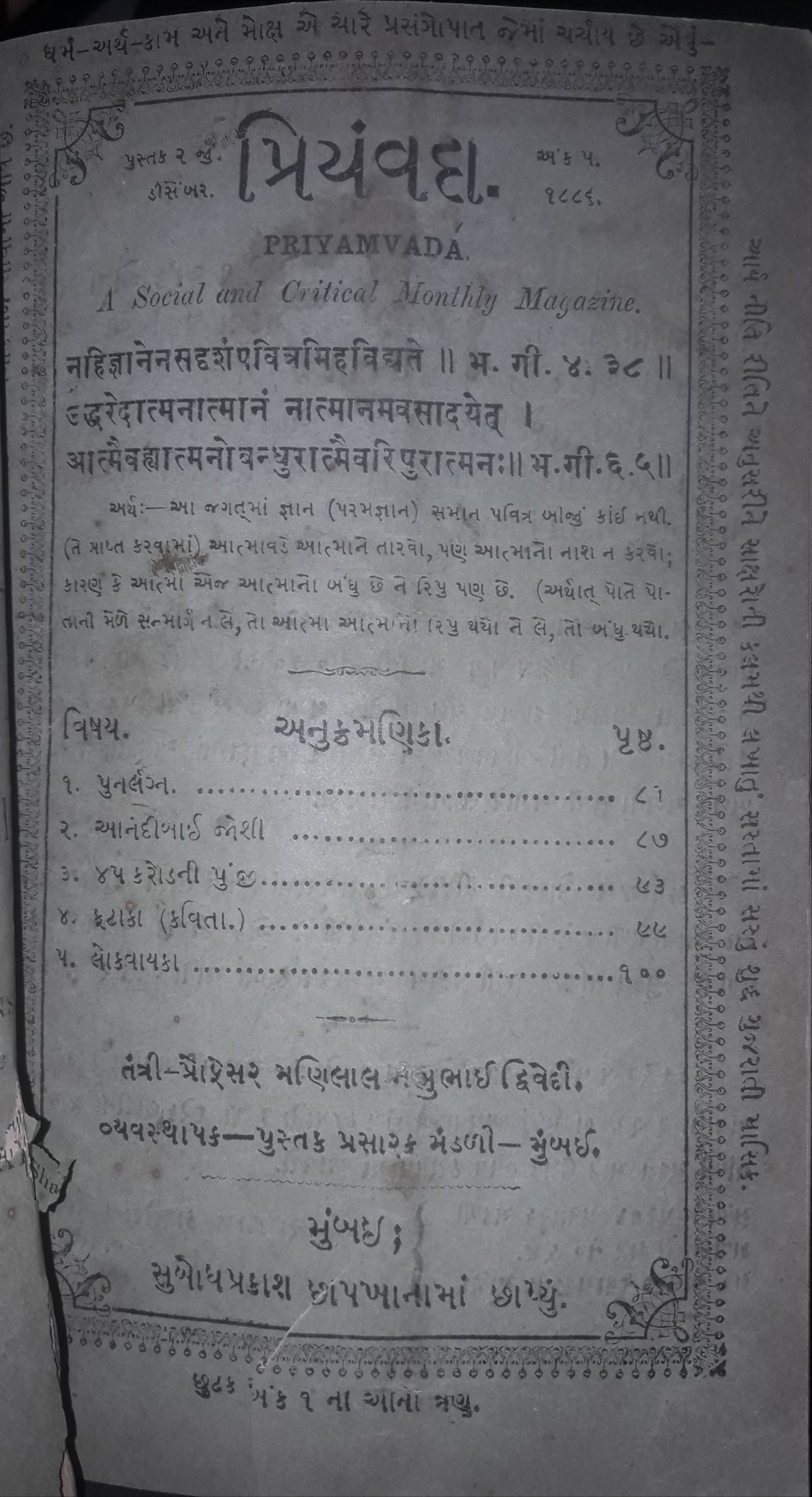
- Cover page, vol. 2, issue 5, December 1886
- Editor: Manilal Nabhubhai Dwivedi
- Frequency: Monthly
- Founder: Manilal Nabhubhai Dwivedi
- First issue: August 1885
- Final issue: September 1890
- Country: British India
- Based in: Bhavnagar
- Language: Gujarati

Priyamvada (pronounced [pri.yəm.və.da]) (lit. the one who speaks in pleasing and elegant manner) was a Gujarati magazine founded and edited by Manilal Nabhubhai Dwivedi. It was established with the aim of educating women, and ran from August 1885 to 1890; it was then converted into another literary magazine, Sudarshan. It was written with an informal tone, which was popular with its readership.

== History ==
After serving as a deputy educational inspector at Bombay, Manilal was transferred at Bhavnagar as a professor. The contemporary social problem of women's education was of great concern to him and he had prepared a detailed scheme to address this but he was not able to implement it in Bhavnagar. Hence, he decided to establish a journal devoted to women's welfare and education. He started a monthly magazine Priyamvada from August 1885. The cost of an annual subscription was one rupee. Manilal stated the aim of magazine on the first page of first issue:

Priyamvada’s style of saying endearing things will keep all happy. But she will favor her women friends, while considering their betterment, mutual understanding and heart to heart talk, her prime ‘dharma’ (commitment)

— Manilal Dwivedi, 1885 (Note: English translation. Original statement in Gujarati: "પ્રિયંવદા પોતાની પ્રિય વદવાની રીતથી સર્વને રંજન કરશે, પણ પોતાની સખીઓ તરફ એની દ્રષ્ટિ વિશેષ રહેશે ખરી: તેમના કલ્યાણમાં, તેમનાં હૃદય સમજવામાં, તેમને સમજાવવામાં મુખ્ય પ્રયત્ન કરવો એ પોતાનો ધર્મ માનશે ખરી.")

The magazine also provided a forum for the discussion of women's problems. It appealed to both the common reader and the elite, and it rapidly became popular.

On account of his ill health, Manilal did not publish Priyamvada in August and September 1888, but resumed in October. Manilal discontinued Priyamvada in 1890 after realizing that it would not flourish so long as it addressed only women readers. He converted it into another monthly magazine, Sudarshan, through which he expanded the scope of the articles to all of the topics he considered important, aimed at society at large.

== Content and style ==
Manilal's only novel Gulabsinh was first serialised in Priyamvada, starting with the magazine's inaugural issue in August 1885, and running to Sudarshana’s June 1895 issue. He published a Gujarati translation of the Gita, with commentaries, from August 1887 (vol. 3, issue 1). It concluded in Sudarashan in September 1893 (vol. 8, issue 12). He published a translation of Samuel Smiles's Character in a series, entitled Sadvritti, from August 1887. This series was also continued in Sudarshan, and was concluded in September 1892 (vol. 7, issue 12). Manilal was of the view that women should have a general knowledge of anatomy as they have to raise their children; therefore, for two years he published a series of articles on the topic written by a doctor.

Manilal wrote most of the material for Priyamvada, addressing his readers in a familiar personal tone. His articles were directly addressed to women readers in a homely and lively style. He used persuasive, but it also used a critical, language in order to attract his readers' attention, especially to issues concerned with women's welfare. While doing so, Manilal adopted a didactic approach which he felt befitted the discourse of 'ideal' Hindu women. Such a conversational style changed its manner naturally with the changing mood of the writer. Manilal identified himself with Priyamvada’s reader and sometimes talked to her in the manner of an elder woman advising a younger one. This approach appealed to its readership and made Priyamvada popular.

== See also ==
- List of Gujarati-language magazines
