= Kaumudi (magazine) =

Gujarati language magazine founded and edited by Vijayray Vaidya

- Editor(s): Vijayray Vaidya (1924–1935); Mulshankar Somnath Bhatt (1935–1937)
- Categories: literature
- Frequency: Quarterly (1924–1930); Monthly (1930–1937)
- Founder: Vijayray Vaidya
- Founded: 1924
- First issue: October 1924; 100 years ago
- Final issue: 1937
- Country: British India
- Language: Gujarati

Kaumudi (pronounced [kəumudi]) was a Gujarati literary magazine published in British India. It was founded in October 1924 by Vijayrai Vaidya who edited it from 1924 to 1935. It was disestablished around 1937.

== History ==
Gujarati literary critic Vijayrai Vaidya had founded, edited and published the first issue of the magazine in October 1924 (on Vijayadashami in Ashwin month of Vikram Samvat 1980) as a quarterly. It was made a monthly in 1930. Until June 1935, Vaidya served as an editor and Mulshankar Somnath Bhatt as a manager. Due to financial difficulties, he signed an agreement with Bhatt and handed over the control. When he found a breach of the agreement later, he ended the agreement and sold his rights to Bhatt for ₹2100. It continued publishing for two and half years with Bhatt as an editor.

== Contents ==
The magazine covered literary movements, literary currents, literary criticism, literary journalism, philosophical articles, reviews and analysis in it. Their editorials and short reviews were popular.

Some of their popular articles are 'Kirtidane Kamalna Patro', 'Sorathi Sahityanai Dhara', 'Gujarati Sahityama Sangeetkavya', 'Lyric', 'Bangali Sahityama Madhusudannu Sthan' and 'Shivaji: Ek Digdarshan'. They had published special issues on poets like Kalapi (June 1925) and Nhanalal (1927). Jyotidra Dave and Dhansukhlal Mehta's novel Ame Badha, Ramanlal Desai's historical novel Bharelo Agni and K. M. Munshi's autobiography Adadhe Raste were serialised in it.

== Reception ==
Kaumudi was well received by the people interested in Gujarati literature and considered as the pioneer of the high standards of the literary criticism in Gujarati.

== See also ==
- List of Gujarati-language magazines
