= Sarojini Mehta =

Indian writer (1898-1977)

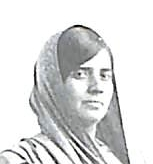
- Sarojini Mehta circa 1932
- Born: 1898
- Died: 1977 (aged 78–79)
- Known for: Social reformer, educationist and writer
- Parents: Ramanbhai Nilkanth (father); Vidyagauri Nilkanth (mother)
- Relatives: Vinodini Nilkanth (sister); Sharda Mehta (aunt)

Sarojini Mehta (1898-1977) was a Gujarati short story writer from Gujarat, India.

== Early life ==
She was born in 1898 to Ramanbhai Nilkanth and Vidyagauri Nilkanth, who were social reformers and writers. She graduated in 1919 and studied sociology in 1923 at the London School of Economics. She served as a superintendent at the Vanita Vishram, Ahmedabad. She married Nanak Mehta, younger brother of Sumant Mehta.

She wrote the short story collections: Ekadashi (1935), Char Patharani Ma (1953) and Valata Pani (1962). She wrote on society, family, child marriage and the position of women in society.

== See also ==
- List of Gujarati-language writers
