= Atmavrittanta =

Autobiography of Manilal Dwivedi (1979)

- First edition cover page (ed. Dhirubhai Thaker)
- Author: Manilal Nabhubhai Dwivedi
- Original title: આત્મવૃત્તાન્ત
- Language: Gujarati
- Genre: Autobiography
- Publisher: Navbharat Sahitya Mandir
- Publication date: July 1979
- Publication place: India
- OCLC: 6148165
- LC Class: PK1859.D88
- Original text: આત્મવૃત્તાન્ત at Gujarati Wikisource

Atmavrittanta (Note: The original manuscript does not have any title. Its custodian Anandshankar Dhruv wrote the title Manilal Nabhubhaino Atmavrittanta (English: Manilal Nabhubhai's Autobiography) on the opening page of the ledger in which the pages the original manuscript was pasted for preservation. When Dhirubhai Thaker edited and published the first edition, it was published with the title Manilal Nabhubhai Dwivedinu Atmavrittanta (English: Manilal Nabhubhai Dwivedi's Autobiography). It is commonly referred as Atmavrittanta (English: Autobiography, lit. 'Story of Life').) (pronounced [atməvruttantə]), formally published as Manilal Nabhubhai Dwivedinu Atmavrittanta, is an autobiography written by Gujarati writer Manilal Nabhubhai Dwivedi (1858–1898). Its publication was prevented for many years by Manilal's family and friends because it contains explicit details of his extramarital relations and controversial views on morality.

Being an honest confession of author's personal life and his limitations, Atmavrittanta has been compared to the Jean-Jacques Rousseau's Confessions and Havelock Ellis's My Life. It has also been criticised for the use of crude and offensive language.

== Overview ==
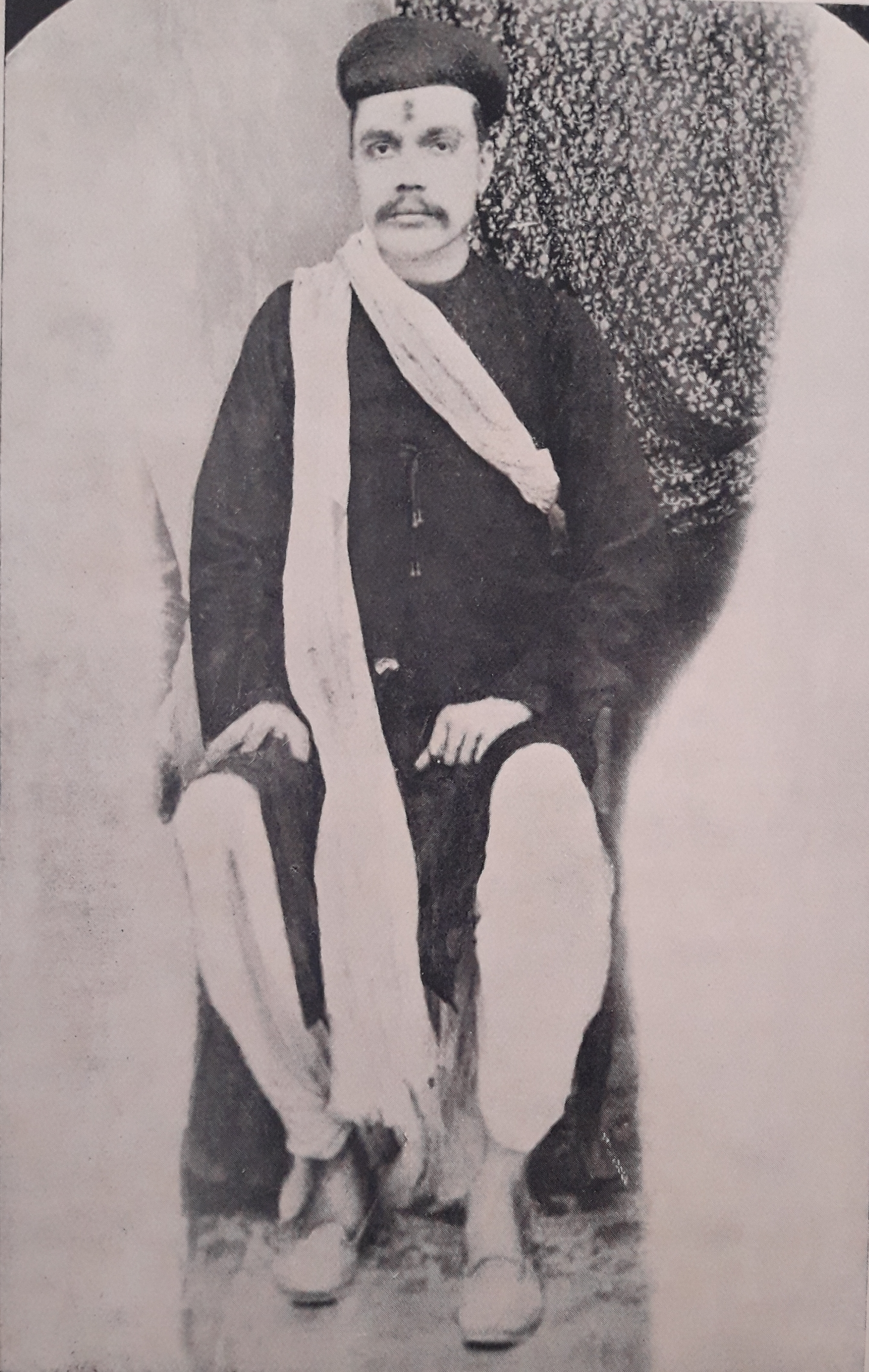
Manilal Dwivedi (1858–1898)

At the age of 28, Manilal decided to write his autobiography and to maintain a diary of important events until the end of his life. Explaining this decision, he wrote: "At this time, if not enemies, I had many opponents among those who held different views and they subjected me to countless unfounded criticisms and were spreading misinformation." Thus, the idea of writing an autobiography emerged in his mind from a sense of victimhood and from a desire to give a true picture of his life.

Manilal started writing an account of his life on 9 February 1887 (at Mumbai), and by 1 May (at Nadiad) completed the story of his life from birth to that date in 95 pages. Then he maintained a diary in which he noted the important events of his life. Up to 22 August 1895, he wrote 27 such notes (20 in Nadiad, 4 in Mumbai, 1 in Vadodara, 1 in Bhavnagar, and 1 in Patan). His account of the last three years of his life is not recorded, or, if recorded, cannot be traced.

== Publication ==
The publication of Atmavrittanta was prevented for many years by Manilal's family and friends because it contains explicit details of his extramarital relations and controversial views on morality.

Manilal handed over the manuscript of his autobiography to his trusted friend Anandshankar Dhruv (1869–1942) before his death in 1898. Dhruv preserved the manuscript throughout his life. During 1929–1931, some young writers, including Ambalal Purani and Vijayray Vaidya, raised a public controversy about the need to publish it and pressed Dhruv to release it. Some debates regarding this issue were also published in Kaumudi, a magazine edited by Vaidya. In the July 1930 issue of Kaumudi, Dhruv published a letter addressed to Vaidya, in which he wrote:

Many people believe that the autobiography of the late Manilal is like De Quincy's Confessions or like the autobiography of Gandhiji. But it not like that. It has some writing about living or recently deceased men and women which will be naturally accepted as not suitable for publication, and the publication of the rest is not beneficial to anyone. Even from a literary perspective there is nothing to read there. (except unique style of Late). Apart from me, this writing was read by the late Madhavlal (younger brother of the late Manilal) who clearly said that it is not suitable for publication...

— Anandshankar Dhruv, 1930 (Note: English translation. Original statement in Gujarati: "આપણા ઘણા ભાઈઓનું માનવું છે કે સ્વ. મણિલાલનું લખેલું આત્મજીવન De Quincy નાં 'Confessions' જેવું, કે ગાંધીજીની આત્મકથા જેવું હશે. એ પ્રકારનું એ બિલકુલ નથી. એમાં હયાત કે થોડા સમય ઉપર ગત થયેલ સ્ત્રી-પુરુષો સંબંધી જે કથન છે એ અત્યારે પ્રસિદ્ધ થાય એ ઈષ્ટ નથી એમ તો સહજ સ્વીકારાશે, અને એ સિવાયનો જે ભાગ છે તે સર્વ પ્રસિદ્ધ કરવાથી કોઈને કશો લાભ થાય એમ નથી બલકે સાહિત્યર્દષ્ટિએ પણ એમાં (સ્વ. ની અનુપમ શૈલી સિવાય) કાંઈ વાંચવા જેવું નથી. આ લેખ મારા ઉપરાંત હજુ સુધી માત્ર સ્વ. માધવલાલે (સ્વ. મણિલાલના નાના ભાઈએ) જ વાંચ્યો છે અને એમણે પણ એ વાંચીને મને સ્પષ્ટ કહેલું કે એ પ્રસિદ્ધ કરવા જેવો નથી...")

Dhruv published some edited extracts from the manuscript in his journal Vasant during 1929 to 1931 in six installments, totaling about 81 pages, but he stopped publishing as soon as the agitation subsided, and then it remained unpublished. Ambalal Purani tried at least fifteen times to obtain a copy of the manuscript from Madhavlal, but was unable to. The manuscript was inherited by Dhruv's son, Dhruvbhai Dhruv after his death. Dhirubhai Thaker, who had written scholarly works on the life and works of Manilal, secured the manuscript from Dhruvbhai Dhruv for his PhD thesis. He copied it, prepared a print copy, and published it in 1979 along with the love letters of Diwalibai written to Manilal. The book was published under the title Manilal Nabhubhai Dwivedinu Atmavrittanta. It was reprinted in 1999.

== Physical description of manuscript ==
The original manuscript is written on the one side of F4 foolscap pages. As the pages are worn out, they are stick to thick and large ledger size pages of ledger book. Some plain and torn pages are stick in it too. Some pages show watermark of year 1885. On the opening page of the ledger, a piece of paper from an envelope of Banaras Hindu University is stick with a title Manilal Nabhubhaino Atmavrutant in Gujarati written by Anandshankar Dhruv. Behind this first page, a plain paper is stick in two parts. On the second page, Dhruv has written an index mentioning seven sections and its corresponding page numbers. One every page written by Dhruv, there is a short English signature by him. The index is as following:

| | Pages |
|---|---|
| Section 1 | 1 to 19 |
| Section 2 | 20 to 37 |
| Section 3 | 38 to 74 |
| Section 4 | 75 to 128 |
| Section 5 | 129 to 170 |
| Section 6 | 171 to 192 |
| Section 7 | 193 to 198 |

Only one manuscript page is stick to each page of the ledge except page numbers 144 and 169 which have two pages of manuscript; 146-147 and 172-173. Manilal had missed number 71 and 131 during marking the page number in manuscript so the manuscript page numbering ends at 198 but it has only 196 pages. Due to sticking two manuscript pages on single ledge page, the page numbering in ledger ends at 194.

== Contents ==
The work is in two parts; the preamble and the diary. The first gives an account of Manilal's life from his birth to his career as a professor, including detailed information on his schooling, on his surroundings and on his companions. The second part is in twenty-seven sections, written on different dates. It contains a day-to-day factual record of events that took place at different places such as Nadiad, Bombay, Baroda, Bhavnagar and Patan.

The autobiography gives an account of Manilal's failed marriage, powerful sexual drives and the degenerate street world in his environments. The autobiography reveals Manilal's constant and obsessive extramarital sexual relations including his disciples' wife, and his complete disregard for his own contradictions. It narrates an account of Manilal's illegal and immoral sexual relations with women and his platonic love for some of them. The book also includes the love-letters addressed to the writer by a lady named Diwali in an appendix.

The autobiography contains open confessions and impulsive statements by the author. Manilal writes about his achievements very briefly but describes in detail his weaknesses and shortcomings including his numerous moral lapses. As he was sure that the manuscript of his autobiography would not be read by anyone during his lifetime, he accurately described his contradictory life. Sometimes his language became crude and offensive. Furthermore, author haven't recorded any memories of joy or details of domestic pleasure.

== Reception and criticism ==
The book has significant historical value as it reflects contemporary life in Gujarat, and provides details of the religious, social, economic, ethical and educational life of 19th-century Gujarat. It also gives valuable details about the origin of Manilal's few poems. Dhirubhai Thaker wrote that the book reminds the reader of the Confessions by Jean-Jacques Rousseau and My Life by Havelock Ellis. Anandshankar Dhruv appreciated the autobiography for its unique style of prose writing. Chandrakant Topiwala acclaimed the truthfulness of autobiography. For Topiwala, the value of this autobiography possibly lay in the material it furnishes not only for future sociologists and psychologists, but also for ecologists who might find in the book's invaluable material shedding light on the organic realities of the Gujarati environment in Manilal's heyday.

Writer Tridip Suhrud criticised its language and wrote:

One of the most striking feature of the autobiography is the layering of languages that a reader encounters. In his [Manilal's] philosophical writings, the prose is chiselled, highly Sanskritised. The local expression has no place in his public writings. Such is the prose of the autobiography in most parts. Only when talking about matters of desire and lust that his language undergoes a complete transformation. The local idioms become available to him. The autobiography is replete with words like Randi (prostitute). The act of intercourse is described by a whole range of colloquial terms — vapari (used her) lidhi (took her) ghasi (rubbed her), maza kari (enjoyed).
