= Ame Badha =

1935 Gujarati humorous novel by Dhansukhlal Mehta and Jyotindra Dave

- Cover Page
- Author: Dhansukhlal Mehta; Jyotindra Dave
- Language: Gujarati
- Genre: humorous novel
- Set in: Surat
- Published: 1935
- Publication place: India
- Media type: Print
- OCLC: 20524493
- Dewey Decimal: 891.477

Ame Badha (pronounced [əme bə.dʰã]; transl. We All) is a Gujarati humorous novel co-authored by Dhansukhlal Mehta and Jyotindra Dave, published in 1935. It is widely considered to be the second humorous novel in Gujarati literature, after Bhadrambhadra (1900) by Ramanbhai Neelkanth. The novel presents the story of protagonist Vipin from his birth to marriage.

== Origin ==
Gujarati writer K. M. Munshi suggested that the authors, Dhansukhlal Mehta and Jyotindra Dave, write a humorous novel for his publication Gujarati. They agreed, and used to frequent Munshi's office and sometimes a restaurant to discuss the novel. Initially, the five chapters of the novel were serialized in Gujarati. When Gujarati was cancelled for unknown reasons, the novel was re-serialized in another magazine, Kaumudi. It was later published as a book in 1935.

The intent of both writers was to depict a picture of contemporary social life in Surat.

== Content ==
Twenty-seven chapters long, the novel is narrated in first person. It does not contain a continuous story, but presents events centered in Surat, the native home of both authors. It offers a humorous account of social life in Surat. The plot follows the life of the protagonist, Vipin, from his birth until after his marriage.

The authors expressed humor through the everyday lives of Surati people. The content depicts typical first-hand knowledge of a 'Surat-born and bred' child, with the brush of a caricaturist. The Surati love for kite-flying, the barber's daily visits, the tailor's adventures in cutting and sewing, the washerman's duties, a hundred other rounds of visits of artisans and others are included in the novel. Some of the chapters from novel include the mode of teaching by the orthodox schoolmaster, the confusion at the time of a Surati wedding, the search for the proper bride, etc.

== Reception ==
The Encyclopaedia of Indian Literature mentions that the novel remains an unparalleled classic in the field of Gujarati humorous literature.

== Adaptation ==
A telefilm directed by Hridaynath Gharekhan, based on Ame Badha, was broadcast on DD Girnar as an episode on the TV series Indian Classics. Dhansukhlal Mehta adapted the novel into a one-act play, Sari Jatu Surat (1942).
