= Dhansukhlal Mehta =

Gujarati writer (1890–1974)

- Born: Dhansukhlal Krishnalal Mehta; 20 October 1890; Wadhwan, Gujarat, India
- Died: August 29, 1974 (aged 83)
- Education: Veermata Jijabai Technological Institute
- Occupations: Novelist; short story writer; humourist
- Writing career
- Language: Gujarati
- Genres: Short story; novel
- Notable work: Ame Badha (1935)
- Notable awards: Ranjitram Suvarna Chandrak (1940); Narmad Suvarna Chandrak (1957)

Dhansukhlal Krishnalal Mehta (October 20, 1890 – August 29, 1974) was a Gujarati writer from Gujarat, India. He is considered a pioneer of Gujarati short stories. He is known for his humorous novel Ame Badha, co-written with Jyotindra Dave. He received the Gujarati literary awards Ranjitram Suvarna Chandrak in 1940 and the Narmad Suvarna Chandrak in 1957.

== Life ==
Dhansukhlal Mehta was born on October 20, 1890, in the city of Wadhwan, which is on the Kathiawar peninsula (now in Surendranagar district, Gujarat). His family was native to Surat. After completing his schooling in Wadhwan, Palitana and Surat, he obtained a diploma from Victoria Jubilee Technical Institute, Mumbai. From 1914 to 1925, he worked at various places in Mumbai, before joining Scindia Steam Navigation Company Ltd. in 1925.

Mehta died on August 29, 1974.

== Works ==
Mehta wrote short stories, plays, literary criticism, book reviews, an autobiography, and humorous essays. According to Mansukhlal Jhaveri, he was a pioneer of Gujarati short stories and one of the first Gujarati writers who depicted psychological conflicts in his characters. His short stories dealt with contemporary family life. However, according to the Encyclopedia of Indian Literature, he couldn't develop the short stories as an art form. Mehta began earnestly studying humorous writers of the West and wrote humorous essays, short stories, and sketches. In 1908, his short stories appeared in Jnanasudha, a magazine edited by Ramanbhai Neelkanth.

Dhansukhlal Mehta never goes far afield in search of humor, but finds it in the actual work-a-day life around him. His art can be fully enjoyed only by a man who has lived in a small town in Gujarat, and as one read his works, he almost comes to love the everyday life of modern Gujarat in spite of its shortcomings.

— Krishnalal Jhaveri, Further Milestone in Gujarati Literature, 1956

Mehta's collections of short stories include Hu, Sarla ane Mitramandal (1920) and Asadharan Anubhav ane Biji Vato (1924). In 1936, he co-wrote Ame Badha (lit. We All), a humorous autobiographical novel, with Jyotindra Dave. It was highly acclaimed and is widely regarded as one of the best humorous novels in Gujarati literature. It was the second humorous novel in Gujarati, after Bhadrambhadra by Ramanbhai Neelkanth. According to Harshavadan Trivedi, it was the first co-written Gujarati novel.

In collaboration with Gulabdas Broker, Mehta wrote Dhumraser, a dramatization of Broker's short story of the same name. His selected humorous works were edited by Vinod Bhatt and published as Hasya Visesha: Dhansukhlal Mehta in 2017.

== Awards ==
Mehta was awarded the Ranjitram Suvarna Chandrak in 1940 for contributions to Gujarati literature. He received the Narmad Suvarna Chandrak in 1957 for Garib Ni Jhunpadi.
