= Vidyagauri Nilkanth =

Indian social reformer, educationist and writer (1876-1958)

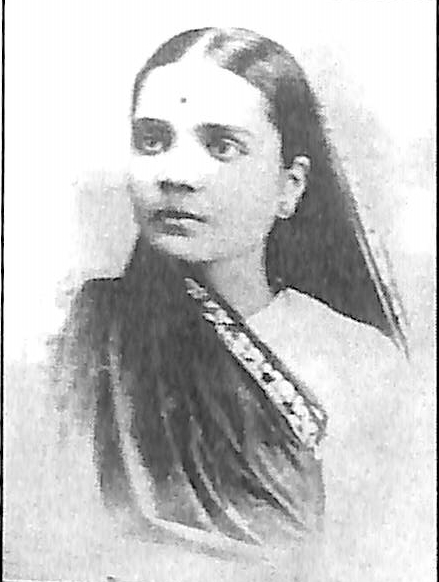
- Vidyagauri around 1895
- Born: 1 June 1876; Ahmedabad
- Died: 7 December 1958 (aged 82)
- Known for: Social reformer, educationist and writer
- Spouse: Ramanbhai Nilkanth (m. 1889)
- Children: Jyotsna Mehta [ [Sarojini Mehta]] Kandarpkumar Nilkanth Saudamini Mehta Vinodonee Nilkanth Sushrutkumar Nilkanth Tarngini Cholia
- Relatives: Sharda Mehta (sister) Sohan Nilkanth (grandson) Swatiben Desai (granddaughter) Rohini Patel (granddaughter) Mukul Patel (great-grandson) Indigo Luksch (great-great-grandson) Elektra Luksch (great-great-granddaughter)

Vidyagauri Nilkanth (1876-1958) was an Indian social reformer, educationist, and writer. She was also one of the first two women graduates in Gujarat.

== Early life ==
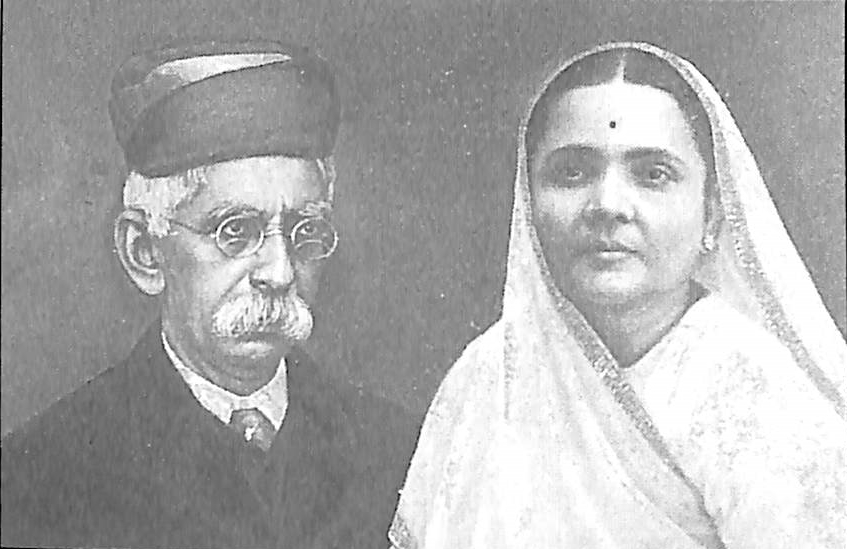
Vidyagauri with her husband Ramanbhai Nilkanth

Vidyagauri Nilkanth was born on 1 June 1876 in Ahmedabad. She was the daughter of a judicial officer, Gopilal Dhruva and Balaben. She was a granddaughter of Bholanath Divetia, a social reformer and poet. She got her primary education (till Class VII) from Raibahadur Maganbhai Girl's High School and completed secondary school education from Anglo-vernacular classes at the Mahalakshmi Teachers Training College. She married Ramanbhai Nilkanth in 1889 and together they wrote many articles, books and jointly edited a magazine, Jnanasudha. Vinodini Nilkanth and Sarojini Mehta were their daughters.

With the support of her husband, she completed her matriculation in 1891 standing the first in Gujarati in the University of Bombay and pursued higher education. She enrolled in 1894 and graduated from Gujarat College with a Bachelor of Arts in moral philosophy and logic in 1901. Her education was interrupted by frequent pregnancies. She was awarded a fellowship and thus her younger sister, Sharda Mehta, and she became the first two women graduates in Gujarat.

== Social work ==
She started tailoring classes for poor Muslim women with support from the National Indian Association. She organized adult education classes and various activities for the War Relief Fund during World War I. She was made MBE for her service. She started the Ahmedabad branch of the All India Women's Conference. She also presided over the Lucknow session of the AIWC. She was associated with numerous educational institutions such as the Maganbhai Karamchand Girls’ High School, the Diwalibai Girls’ School, Ranchhodhal Chhotalal Girls’ High School and the Vanita Vishrams which provided secondary education to women who were widows or dropouts from school because of marriage.

She founded Lalshanker Umia Shanker Mahila Pathshala, which was later affiliated to SNDT (Karve) University. She taught English, Psychology and Philosophy in this college.

She was briefly served as a government appointed member of a committee in the Ahmedabad municipality. She was associated with Prartha Samaj and was Honorary Secretary and then President of the Mahipatram Rupram Anath Ashram, an orphanage.

== Literary career ==
She contributed to women’s magazines such as Gunsundari, Streebodh, and Sharada. She was the president of the 15th session of the Gujarati Sahitya Parishad. She had also served as a president of Gujarat Vidya Sabha and Gujarat Sahitya Sabha.

She had written several essays with light humour as well as biographical sketches. Foram (1955) includes biographical sketches of his relatives and associates which influenced her. Her other essay collections are: Grihadipika (1931), Narikunj (1956), Gyansudha (1957). Her miscellaneous essays are included in Hasyamandir. She had written biography Pro. Dhondo Keshav Karve (1916).

With her sister Sharda Mehta, she translated Romesh Chunder Dutt’s book, The Lake of Palms (1902) as Sudhasuhasini (1907); and The Maharani of Baroda (Chimnabai II)'s Position of Women in Indian Life (1911) as Hindustanma Streeonu Samajik Sthan (1915).

== Awards ==
In 1926, she was awarded Kaisar-i-Hind medal.

== See also ==
- List of Gujarati-language writers
