= Ratilal Borisagar =

Gujarati writer (born 1938)

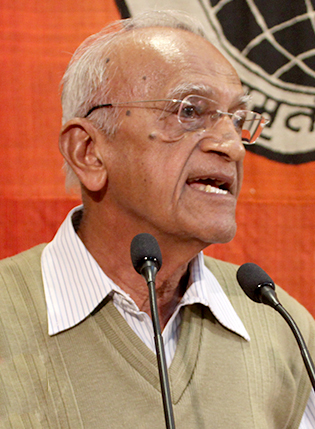
- Borisagar at Gujarati Vishwakosh Trust; February 2019
- Born: 31 August 1938 (age 88); Savarkundla (now in Gujarat, India)
- Occupations: Humourist, essayist, editor
- Writing career
- Language: Gujarati
- Notable awards: Sahitya Akademi Award (2019); Padma Shri (2026)

Academic background
- Thesis: Gujaratima Sahityik Sampadan: Vivechanatmak Adhyayan (1989)
- Doctoral advisor: Chandrakant Sheth

Ratilal Mohanlal Borisagar (born 31 August 1938) is an Indian Gujarati-language humourist, essayist and editor from Gujarat, India. Born and educated in Savarkundla, he received a PhD in 1989. After working for some years as a teacher, he joined the state school textbook board until his retirement in 1998. He started his writing career as a story writer, but eventually gained acclaim as a humourist. He published several humour collections and humour novels, including the acclaimed book Enjoygraphy. He edited several works of children's literature and humour literature. In 2019, he received the Sahitya Akademi Award for his essay collection, Mojma Revu Re. He was awarded the 2026 Padma Shri for his contribution in the field of literature and education.

== Biography ==
Ratilal Borisagar was born on 31 August 1938 in Savarkundla (now Amreli district, Gujarat) to Mohanlal and Santokben Borisagar. He completed his primary and secondary education in that district. Ratilal passed SSC examination in 1956. He completed his BA in 1963 and MA in 1967. He later obtained a BEd to teach in schools. In 1989, Borisagar received a PhD for his thesis Gujaratima Sahityik Sampadan: Vivechanatmak Adhyayan (Literary Editing in Gujarati: A Critical Study).

Borisagar worked as a primary school teacher for three years and secondary school teacher for eight and half years. He also briefly worked as a clerk in a post office. He joined the Savarkundla college in 1971, as a professor of Gujarati. In 1974 he left professorship and joined Gujarat State School Textbook Board as the Academic Secretary. He worked there for 21 years and retired as the Deputy Director (Academic) in 1998.

He co-edited the Akhand Anand magazine for seven years and was a committee member of the Gujarat Sahitya Sabha. He served as a Managing Secretary of the Gujarati Sahitya Parishad from 2005 to 2009 and established Matrubhasha Samvardhan Kendra (Mother-tongue Development Centre) there.

== Works ==
Borisagar started his career as a short story writer, however his humorous nature brought him into humour writing, where he received acclaim. His humour is simple and self-deprecating, with light sarcasm or satire. He was directly influenced by his parents, his neighbour Dhanbai, and his high school teacher Mukundrai Pandya. In 1956, Borisagar's first short story Samaj Jagashe was published in the Mahilajagat biweekly magazine. In 1960, he published his first humour essay Chavaya Vagarnu Kathavastu in Chandani magazine, he later wrote humour essays for the Aaram magazine. He is considered a literary descendant of humourist Jyotindra Dave.

Borisagar's first collection of humour essays, Marak Marak (1977), established him as a humour writer. His second collection, Anandlok (1983), was also well received. His other humour collections include Tilak Karta Tresath Thaya (2002), 'Gya' Thi 'Ka' Sudhi (2004), Bhaj Anandam (2007), Amathu Amathu Kem Na Hasiye! (2008), Om Hasyam (2009), Mojma Revu Re and Tran Athvadiya Americama (2019).

In 1994, Borisagar published his first humorous novel, Sambhavami Yuge Yuge, in which he represented the title character from the Gujarati classic novel Bhadrambhadra in contemporary milieu with light criticism of Sardar Sarovar Dam, the world's second biggest dam in terms of volume of concrete used. His most acclaimed work is the autobiographical humorous novel Enjoygraphy (1997), which is a satire on his experience with heart disease and angiography, medical profession and hospital management. In 2014, he published another humorous novel, Bhadrambhadra Amar Chhe, focusing on gender equality. He has written six novellas as well.

In 1994, he published a collection of quotes on children by various authors entitled Balvandana. His other works of children's literature are Mahabharatna Prasango (2002) and Shreshth Balrachanao (2009). He has edited several issues of children's stories about the fictional character Bakor Patel. He has also edited several children's poetry books in the Gurjar Balkavya Vaibhav series.

He also writes plays and criticism as well as edits works. Ramanbhai Nilkanth (2002) and Gujarati Pratikavyo (2003) are his works of criticism. He edited or co-edited Gurjar Prahasansanchay (with Raghuveer Chaudhari, 1998), Gurjar Adyatan Prahasansanchay (with Raghuveer Chaudhari, 1998), Gurjar Hasyanibandhsanchay (with Bholabhai Patel, 1998), Ma E Ma (1999), Anokha Jeevancharitro (1999), Namu Te Hasyabrahmane (2000), Pita Pappa Daddy (2002), Hasyatetrisi (with Vinod Bhatt, 2002), Bhavbhumi (with Bharati R. Dave and Raghuveer Chaudhari, 2002), Arvachin Gujarati Hasyarachanao (2003), Jyotindra Dave Hasyavaibhav (2004) and Na. Pra. Buchni Shreshth Hasyarachanao (2007).

He published essays in Kumar magazine from 1978 to 1982. He wrote a humour column entitled "Marak Marak" for the Sandesh daily newspaper from 1998 to 2003. His several radio plays are broadcast by All India Radio. He has also written a Gujarati comedy TV series, Professor Zunzunwala.

== Recognition ==
Borisagar's Marak Marak received the Jyotindra Dave Humour Prize in 1978, in addition to second prize from the Gujarat Sahitya Akademi. His Anandlok and Enjoygraphy have also received Gujarat Sahitya Akademi prizes. Enjoygraphy also received the Ghanshyamdas Sharaf Sarvottam Sahitya award in 1997. He received the Dhanji Kanji Gandhi Suvarna Chandrak in 2002, the Chandrakant Anjaria Memorial Trust Education Award in 2003, the Kavi Dahyabhai Patel Sahityaratna Suvarna Chandrak in 2011, and the Sachchidanand Samman in 2011. In 2019, Borisagar received the Sahitya Akademi Award for his essay collection Mojma Revu Re. He was awarded the 2026 Padma Shri for his contribution in the field of literature and education.

== See also ==
- List of Gujarati-language writers

Awards
Preceded by Sharifa Vijaliwala	Recipient of the Sahitya Akademi Award winners for Gujarati; 2019	Succeeded by Harish Meenashru
