= Ramesh Sumant Mehta =

- Born: 27 December 1906; Ahmedabad, British India
- Died: 1998 (aged 91–92)
- Education: Bachelor in Civil Engineering; Masters in Sanitary Engineering
- Alma mater: University of Bombay; Cornell University
- Occupations: Environmental–sanitary engineer and educator
- Spouse: Pushpa Bhatt (after 1940)
- Parents: Sumant Mehta (father); Sharda Mehta (mother)

Ramesh Sumant Mehta (27 December 1906 – 1998) was an Indian educator and environmental and sanitary engineer. Born to social worker parents, he was educated in civil and sanitary engineering. He did pioneering work in the field of water supply, drainage, waste management and pollution control in India. Along with his advisory roles, he served with several educational institutes in various capacities.

== Early life ==
Ramesh Mehta was born on 27 December 1906 at Ahmedabad to social worker parents: Sumant and Sharda Mehta. He completed his school education in Ahmedabad, Baroda (now Vadodara) and Karachi. He graduated in Civil Engineering from the University of Bombay in 1931 and received a Masters in Sanitary Engineering from Cornell University, US in 1933.

He married Pushpa Bhatt in 1940.

== Career ==
Mehta returned to India in 1933 and joined a company, Duncan Stretton, as a sanitary engineer. In 1936, he was appointed as waterworks engineer by Bhavnagar State where he implemented a water collection and purification project. In 1945, he was appointed Chief Sanitary Engineer in Nagpur by the Improvement Trust where he implemented a water supply and drainage system.

After the independence of India in 1947, he joined the Water Sewage Board, New Delhi as engineer, secretary and adviser on the invitation of Sardar Vallabhbhai Patel, Home Minister of India. He also served as the government appointed adviser of the various public health engineer projects. In 1958, he joined the Municipal Corporation of Delhi as the Chief Engineer and implemented the largest municipal drainage system in India. He was a member of the expert committee on pollution control and water management appointed by the Government of India and World Health Organisation (WHO).

In 1961, he was appointed the first director of the Council of Scientific and Industrial Research (CSIR)'s National Environmental Engineering Research Institute (NEERI). After retirement from government service, under assignment by the WHO, he served as professor of environmental engineering in Nairobi, Kenya. Later he served as the Vice Chancellor of Sardar Patel University in Gujarat from 1970 to 1974. He was also associated with the environment engineering department of Birla Vishwakarma Mahavidyalaya, Vallabh Vidyanagar. He also served as an environmental adviser to Bangladesh.

In 1975, he was appointed the first Chairman of the Gujarat Pollution Control Board. He established a research laboratory in Vadodara, Bharuch, Rajkot and Vapi during his tenure, invented techniques in solid waste management and recycling and wrote several research papers. He was appointed President of the Indian Water Works Association.

He was also associated with the Safai Vidyalaya of Sabarmati Ashram which is active in the field of sanitation education. He also served as chairman of the trust which operates the Sheth C. N. Vidyalaya and other educational institutes in Ahmedabad.

He died in 1998.
