= Vanita Prasad =

Vanita Prasad is an Environmental Biotechnologist from the city of Vadodara in Gujarat, India. She is known mostly for her advancements in the field of waste treatment and the production of energy from the primary by-product of treating waste, biogas. She has been working in this industry for 28 years.

== Education and Early Work ==
When Prasad was a small child, CT scan technology was rare and expensive in her area. She was one of the very small amount of people in that area to get one, and it sparked her interest in biology and neuroscience. Prasad started her adult education at the University of Delhi, where she graduated with a degree in Science. She then obtained both her Master's degree and her Ph.D from the India Department of Biotechnology.

With these degrees Prasad went on to work at several Indian waste management companies. She mainly served as a temporary expert consultant for these companies, who used her knowledge about the topic of biotechnology to engineer cultures of microorganisms meant to break down human waste efficiently. She first worked at Paramount and Day Star Green, where she collaborated with the Gujarat Pollution Control Board to come up with new strategies to make industries more environmentally sustainable. While working at these companies she noticed the regulation and taxes on imported cultures, which she disapproved of. It harmed bioreactors by making them far less efficient, and therefore also less attractive to companies that may want a source of energy. An accident with a broken tailbone suddenly slowed her regular work and made it more painful, so she decided to apply for the Biotechnology Ignition Grant.

== Current work and inventions ==
When Prasad started to make advancements in the biotechnology of water treatment she mainly focused on the issue of the efficiency of treatment plants. These Indian treatment plants often use imported cultures that are not native to India, causing them to not be as efficient due to different environmental conditions. Prasad and her company, REVY Environmental Solutions, work to bioengineer and patent cultures of microbes made specifically to convert waste to usable water, along with gaining the useful by-product of biogas. These microbes work together to break down the waste into the useful gases biomethane and biohydrogen. These biogases are then refined and put into a combustion engine that converts the energy released by the gases into electricity.

She also received the Biotechnology Ignition Grant from the Department of Biotechnology, a grant designed to provide knowledgeable biotechnologists with enough money for them to develop a product. With this grant she designed her third patent, this being the first in waste management, as well as her first patent that was for a product rather than a process. Her first two patents both had to do with the capture of biogases from vegetable markets. This new patent was, in her words, a "dry granulated sludge," a mixture of 56 microbes that were specially engineered to collaborate in making a waste treatment plant produce biogas far more efficiently. She compared this new invention to a sort of software update to the bioreactor, something that could bring life back into it.

In 2017, Prasad founded REVY Environmental Solutions Pvt. Ltd. along with her husband, Rajneesh Prasad, who now works as the director of the company, and Bhavik Kathrani, who directs the company's finances.

== Awards ==
Prasad has received many awards and grants including the Royal Academy of Engineering's Leaders in Innovation Fellowship, AD and Biogas Hero of the Year from the AD and Biogas industry experts, and the Mulan award from the BRICS Women's Business Alliance.
