= Raino Parvat =

1914 Gujarati play by Ramanbhai Neelkanth

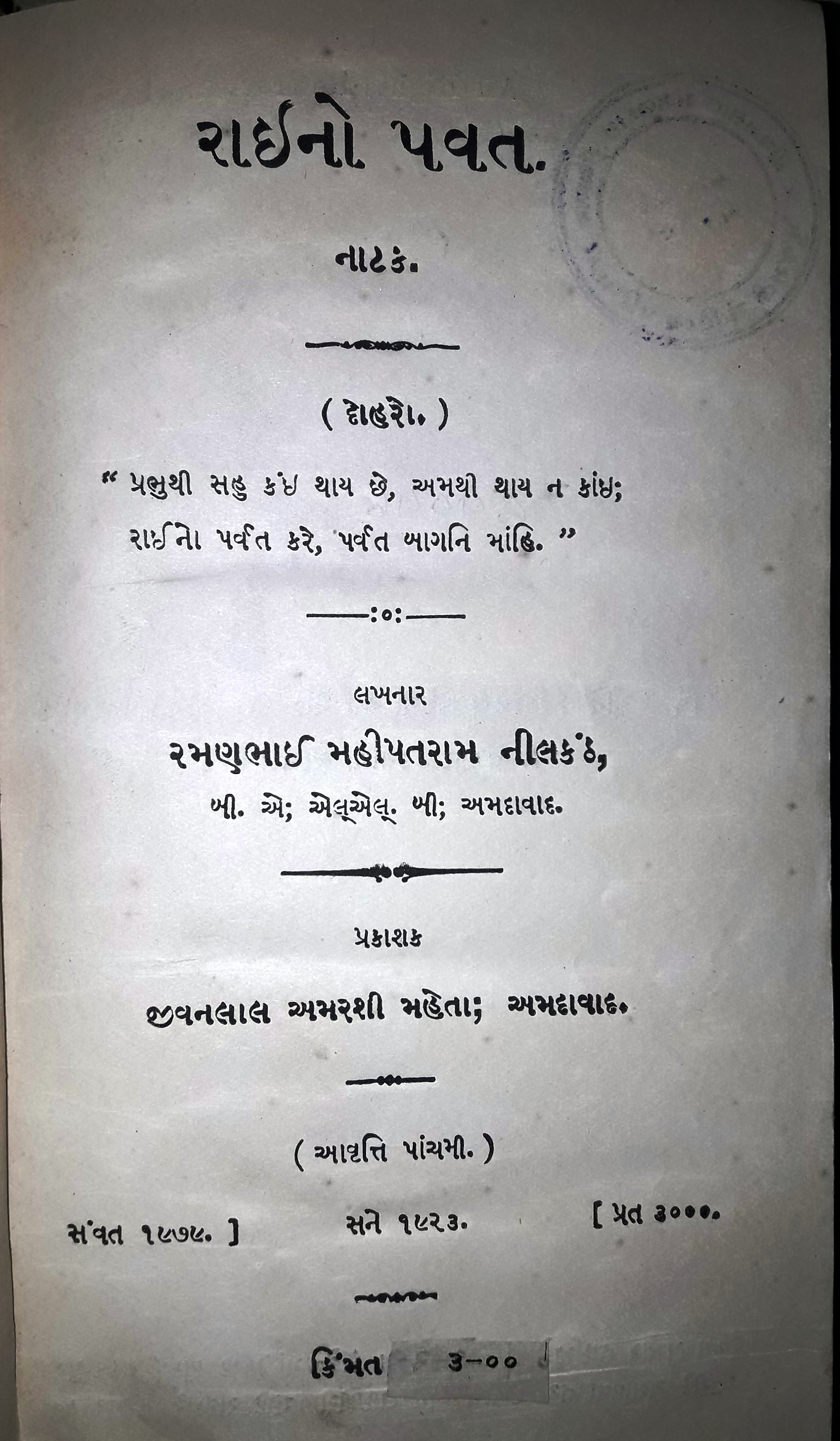
- Title page of 5th edition, 1923
- Written by: Ramanbhai Neelkanth
- Characters: Parvatrai; Lilavati; Vinavati; Manjari; Sitalsinh; Jalaka/Amritdevi; Rai/Jagdeep; Durgesh; Kalyankam; Savitri; Kamala; Pushpasen
- Original language: Gujarati

Premiere
- Date premiered: 14 March 1915 (probably)

Raino Parvat (transl. a mountain out of a mustard seed) is a 1914 Gujarati play by Ramanbhai Neelkanth (1868–1928), written with an eye on social reform attempts to bring about a synthesis of the Sanskrit and English styles of drama. It is considered a classic play of Gujarati literature. It tells a story of a gardener who become king due to the circumstances.

== Background and structure ==
Ramanlal was influenced by Kanta (1882), a Gujarati play written by Manilal Dwivedi, and decided to write a play. In 1895, he started writing Raino Parvat but stopped after writing the first act. He briefly worked on it in May 1909. He completed it around the end of 1913 and published it in 1914.

Ramanbhai Neelkanth fused the tradition of Sanskrit drama with Shakespearean technique in Raino Parvat, the only play he wrote. It has 7 acts running into 36 scenes. The plot was inspired from the following couplet appearing in the Lalji Maniar Vesha of Bhavai, a traditional Gujarati folk play:

સાંઇઆંસે સબ કુચ્છ હોત હે, મુજ બંદેસે કચુ નહીં;
રાઈકું પરબત કરે, પરબત બાગેજ માંહી.

— લાલજી મનીઆર
Translation:

Everything is done by God, nothing by us,
He alone can make a mountain out of a mustard seed.

— Lalji Maniar, Mahipatram Rupram Nilkanth

== Characters ==
Principal characters are:

- Parvatrai, king of Kanakpur
- Lilavati, young queen of Parvatrai
- Vinavati, daughter of Parvatrai and Lilavati
- Manjari, Lilavati's maid
- Sitalsinh, Parvatrai's bodyguard
- Jalaka, a gardener woman who is secretly Amritdevi, queen of the predecessor king, Ratnadeep
- Rai, a gardener who is secretly Jagdeep, the son of Ratnadeep
- Durgesh, the chief of distant land
- Kalyankam, a minister
- Savitri, wife of Kalyankam
- Kamala, daughter of Kalyakam and Savitri
- Pushpasen, an army chief

== Play ==
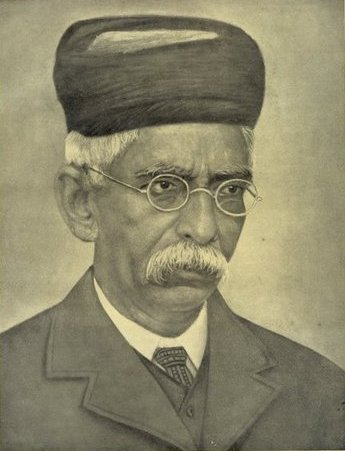
Ramanbhai Neelkanth

=== Act 1 ===
Parvatrai, the king of Kanakpur, is concerned about the age difference with his young queen, Lilavati. He is tempted to regain his youth through the rejuvenation treatment of Jalaka, a gardener woman. He enters her garden to see a demonstration but is mistaken for an animal and killed by Rai. Jalaka and the king's bodyguard, Sitalsinh, bury the king in the garden and claim that he is in seclusion for the six-month rejuvenation treatment, leaving his minister, Kalyankam, to rule. Jalaka had been promised one-quarter of the kingdom if the treatment worked. But since Parvatrai is dead, she reveals to Rai that they are Queen Amritdevi and Prince Jagdeepdev, wife and heir of King Ratnadeepdev who Parvatrai dethroned through treachery. Rai agrees to follow his mother's wishes though he is troubled by his conscience.

=== Act 2 ===
Kalyankam and the chief of the army, Pushpasen, discuss the state of affairs. Durgesh, chief of a distant region of the state, tries to revolt but Kalyankam shrewdly promotes him as a deputy minister under his close supervision. Durgesh tries to gain the secret of Parvatrai's treatment but Jalaka withholds the information. Rai is injured falling from a horse and brought to Kayahkam's home for treatment. Kalyankam and his wife, Savitri, arrange a marriage between Pushpasen's daughter, Kamala, and Durgesh.

=== Act 3 ===
Durgesh, Kamala and Rai travel in disguise to learn how people view the king's rejuvenation experiment. They meet a monk who is displeased with it. Then they come across a group of people wearing mirrors on their bodies who sing that Old Parvatrai removed the mirrors from the palace, and when he is young they want him to return the mirrors to the kingdom. The men in the street remark that they are more concerned with the king's heart than his body, as they want a good king whether old or young. Someone makes a disparaging remark about a woman, which enrages Kamala, dressed as a man, but Durgesh intervenes to stop her attack. After returning home, Rai and Durgesh vow to campaign against the low status of women in the kingdom.

=== Act 4 ===
Rai had agreed to act as the rejuvenated king. Sitalsinh secretly takes him to see important places and gain familiarity with Parvatrai's life. He is brought to spy on Lilavati's chambers, where she is eager to lovingly receive her husband. Rai realizes with some shock that becoming king means he will become Lilavati's husband, and feels this to be utterly immoral and unjust. After brief consideration, he decides to give up his right to become Parvatrai's successor.

=== Act 5 ===
Six months have passed and a royal procession moves through the streets. Savitri and Kamala try to compare the young king to the Parvatrai they remembered, but are surprised that the new king looks like Rai. He enters the Prabhapunj palace where Queen Lilavati lovingly welcomes him but he refuses her embrace. Rai reveals that he is Prince Jagdeep and explains what happened. Lilavati faints and Rai helps her regain consciousness, respectfully addressing her as queen mother. Unaware of this, Jalaka offers flowers for Lilavati's chambers and is brutally attacked by Lilavati, who curses her: "never ever shall ye be queen, and you shall meet death as malan [transl. gardener woman] with a broken heart like mine." When Rai is crowned as king Parvatrai, he discloses to the court his real identity and asks the people and courtiers to decide the succession within a fortnight, during which time he will withdraw from the city.

=== Act 6 ===
Jagdeep is wandering when he saves a woman from a boat mishap on the riverbank. The woman is Vinavati, Parvatrai's daughter who has lived in seclusion since becoming a widow. She falls in love with Jagdeep at first sight and he is enamoured of her. Durgesh acts as a go-between and Vinavati's maid, Rekha, tells of her past history. Jagdeep kisses Vinavati's finger in place of a ring, as a token of his love, and departs.

=== Act 7 ===
Sitalsinh, with the help of Lilavati's maid, Manjari, conspires to persuade Lilavati to adopt his son as heir of the crown, but the scheme fails miserably. Jalaka has become despondent and ultimately dies. Jagdeep is elected as Pravatrai's successor and installed as king with Vinavati as the queen.

== Criticism ==
Ramanlal Joshi noted that the handling of dramatic situations, characterization, dialogues, and depiction of lofty sentiments make this play a classical work. However, the play has been criticized for its long drawn-out sequence which is not suitable for the stage. Bipin Jhaveri wrote Raino Parvatni Samiksha (Criticism of Raino Parvat) which was an expansion of his Ph.D. thesis submitted in 1950. Anantrai Raval also published Raino Parvat: Vivechan (Criticism of Raino Parvat) in 1938, reprinted in 1957.

Several critics noted that: "Ramanbhai Nilkanth, a follower of Prarthana Samaj, asserts his social reformer's signature by arranging Rai's marriage with Vinavati, a widow, in the last two acts which ultimately weakens its plot.

== Performance history ==
Possibly on 14 March 1915, the play was first performed by Gujarati Amateurs Group of Grant Medical College under the leadership of Manubhai, son of Nanalal Dalpatram. The play was split in three acts and it included two songs and a shloka, written by Narsinhrao Divetia. The second performance was held in Ahmedabad in 1926 and was directed by Bapulal Nayak, a Mumbai based actor and director of Mumbai Gujarati Natak Mandali. Jaishankar Sundari played the role of Lilavati in it while the role of Rai was played by Bapulal himself. In 1948, under the guidance of Jaishankar Sundari and Jashvant Thakkar, the students of Gujarat Vidhya Sabha performed Raino Parvat for the centenary of the institution. In this performance, Vinodini Nilkanth, daughter of Ramanbhai Neelkanth, played the role of Jalka.

== Adaptations ==
- Raino Darpanrai, a Gujarati play by Hasmukh Baradi, was adapted from Raino Parvat.
- Jalaka, a three-act play by Chinu Modi, is based on the Raino Parvat character of the same name.
