= Lallubhai Samaldas =

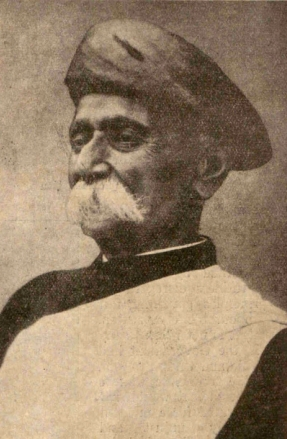

Sir Lallubhai Samaldas Mehta (14 October 1863 – 14 October 1936) was a wealthy aristocrat and revenue commissioner since the age of 18 in the court of the Maharaja of Bhavnagar in Gujarat. He was involved in the establishment of numerous industries in western India, particularly in the shipping industry. He also took an interest in the cooperative movement and presided over the Swadeshi League and is known as the Father of Co-operative Movement in India. The Samaldas College in Bhavnagar was established by Maharaja of Bhavnagar in his father's memory. He also took an interest in national politics and was associated with the leaders of the time.

== Life and work ==
Lallubhai was born in Bhavnagar, Saurashtra. His father Samaldas was a Chief Justice and Dewan in the kingdom of Bhavnagar, a position that was also held by his grandfather Parmananddas from 1828 to 1877. Born in aristocracy he went to study in Bhavnagar and then at Elphinstone College before working for the Maharaja of Bhavnagar. He married Satyavati, granddaughter of Bholanath Sarabhai in 1884. He became a revenue commissioner in 1884. In 1926 he visited England to organize ships for the Scindia Steam Navigation Company which he developed along with Walchand Hirachand and Narottam Morarjee. He also travelled to Japan in 1933 about which he wrote a book, "My Impressions of Japan". He established a mill, served as a director of the Tata Iron and Steel Company, Tata Hydro and Advance Mills. He is regarding as the Father of the Indian cooperative movement, which was carried forward by his eldest son, Vaikunth Mehta. Lallubhai was also the pioneer of life insurance, cement and sugar industries. He was made CIE in 1914 and knighted in 1926 by King George V at the Buckingham Palace in London. His sons - Vaikunth, Jyotendra and Gaganvihari - went to lay foundations of co-operative banking, insurance and the economy as well.
