= Kanti Madia =

Indian actor, director, producer and playwright (1932–2004

- Born: 7 March 1932; Lathi, Gujarat, India
- Died: 15 June 2004 (aged 72)
- Other name: Kanti Madiya
- Occupations: Actor, director, playwright, producer
- Known for: Kashino Dikro (1979) film

Kanti Madia (or Kanti Madiya) was an Indian actor, director, playwright, and producer from Gujarat, India. He established the Natyasampada theatre company, and directed more than thirty plays. He is particularly known for directing the Gujarati film Kashino Dikro (1979), his only film.

== Early life and education ==
Kanti Madia was born on 7 March 1932 into a Jain family in the former princely state Lathi. In 1948, he entered in Bhavan's College in Mumbai, where he won prizes for acting and directing.

== Career ==
In 1952, he started his career in theatre. His first one-act play, Raakhna Ramakada, became instant hit. In 1959, he established Bohemians theatre company.

Although Madia received many offers from Bollywood, he directed only one film, Kashino Dikro (1979), which he adapted from the Gujarati short story, Dariyav Dil, written by Vinodini Nilkanth. The film was mainly noted for a moving portrayal by actress Rita Bhaduri.

In 1980, Madia founded the Kavyasampada poetry club.

He also acted in "Episode 42 – A Horse And Two Goats" of the Hindi television serial Malgudi Days.

== Death ==
Madia died on 15 June 2004.

== Legacy ==
In 2017, writer Sanjay Chhel published a book on Madia, entitled Mutthi Unchera Madia.
