= Vijayray Vaidya =

Gujarati language writer from India

- Born: 7 April 1897; Bhavnagar
- Died: 17 April 1974 (aged 77)
- Education: Bachelor of Arts
- Alma mater: Wilson College, Mumbai
- Occupations: Critic, essayist, biographer
- Writing career
- Pen name: Mayuranand, Vinodkant, Shivnandan Kashyap
- Language: Gujarati
- Notable works: Sahityadarshan (1935); Gatshataknu Sahitya (1959); Lilasooka Paan (1943); Kaumudimanan (1985, posthumously)
- Notable awards: Ranjitram Suvarna Chandrak (1931); Narmad Suvarna Chandrak (1955)

Vijayray Kalyanray Vaidya was a Gujarati critic, biographer and essayist. After studying languages, he was engaged in Gujarati literary journalism and later criticism. He edited several magazines and wrote works of criticism, biography and essays.

== Biography ==
Vijayray Vaidya was born on 7 April 1897 in Bhavnagar. He completed a B.A. in English and Sanskrit from Wilson College, Bombay in 1920. He served as a cashier in Sir Lallubhai Shamaldas Bank, Bombay from 1920 to 1921. He joined Gujarati periodical, Chetna. He served as an editor of Hindustan Weekly of Bombay and a subeditor of daily from 1921 to 1922. On invitation of K. M. Munshi, he served as an in-charge editor of Gujarat. He served with Sahitya Sansad from 1922 to 1924. He started Kaumudi, a quarterly and later a monthly. After it was stopped, he started Manasi in 1935. He taught Gujarati at M.T.B. College, Surat from 1937 to 1949 or 1952 along with editing Manasi. Manasi was published till 1960 with some breaks. He presided over the criticism department of Gujarati Sahitya Parishad in Surat in 1965. He was a founder member of All India P.E.N. Centre. He edited Rohini in last period of life but had little success.

He died on 17 April 1974.

== Works ==
He had long career of literary journalism and criticism. His Sahityadarshan (1935) is about theory of literary criticism and Jui ane Ketaki (1939) is about applied criticism. Nhanalal Kavini Jivandrishti is a criticism of works of Nanalal Dalpatram Kavi. Gatashatak nu Sahitya (1959) is about the first hundred years of the modern Gujarati literature. Leela Suka Pana (1942) had research articles. Parasna Sparshe (1963), Neelam Ane Pokhraj (1962) and Manek Ane Akik (1967) are the collections of criticism. Gujarati Sahityani Rooprekha (1943) is about history of Gujarati literature.

He wrote essays under pen name Vinodkant. His collections of essays are Prabhatna Rang (1927), Najuk Savari (1938), Udata Pan (1945), Dariyavni Mithi Lahar (1965). His Khuski Ane Tari (1933) is a travelogue of his visit to Karachi and Rangoon.

Sukratarak (1944) is a biography of Navalram Pandya. Saurashtrano Mantrishwar (1959) is a biography of Gaurishankar Udayshankar Oza, the dewan of Bhavnagar State. Vinayakni Atmakatha (1970) is an autobiographical work.

During later years of his life, he started enormous task of compiling an encyclopedia of world literature single handed. He could publish only first volume of his work, Sahitya Priyano Sathi (1967).

== Awards ==
He was awarded Ranjitram Suvarna Chandrak in 1931 and Narmad Suvarna Chandrak in 1955.
