= Jnanasudha =

Gujarati language magazine (1892-1919)

Jnanasudha (also spelled as Gnansudha or Gyansudha) was a Gujarati magazine that ran from 1892 to 1919, in which Ramanbhai Neelkanth edited.

== History ==
Jnanasudha began publishing weekly as an organization of Ahmedabad Prarthana Samaj. There are no surviving copies of the magazine before 1892, so the date of first publication is not traceable. It is certain that when the magazine was handed over to Ramanbhai Neelkanth in 1887, it published its newspaper weekly, and then monthly in January 1892.

Neelkanth was busy in the administration of Prarthana Samaj and in social reform activities, so he handed over the magazine to Jivanlal Amarshi Mehta, a publisher who edited the magazine for one year. Then, the magazine was edited by Gatulal Gopilal Dhruv, a secretary of Prarthana Samaj, until it stopped publishing in 1919.

== Contents ==
Neelkanth used Jnanasudha to propound the religious principles of Prarthana Samaj, and resisted the superstitious beliefs and malpractices of Hindu society. With the exception of Raino Parvat (1914), most of Neelkanth's writings were published in this magazine. Neelkanth's only novel, Bhadrambhadra (1900), was first serialised in Jnanasudha, starting in April 1892 and concluding in June 1900.

The debates between Manilal Dwivedi and Neelkanth on the subjects of Dvaita (dualism) and Advaita (non-dualism) philosophy was carried in the pages of Manilal's Sudarshan and in Jnanasudha. These debates are considered unparalleled in Gujarat's history of reflective literature.

Other notable contributions to the magazine include Neelkanth's Kavitasiddhanta (Theory of Poetry), Kant's critique of Siddhantasara, Balwantray Thakore's sonnets under the title Premno Divas, Nhanalal's poem Vasantotsav, and the debate between Narsinhrao Divetia and Govardhanram Tripathi on Gujarati spellings.

Dhirubhai Thaker published Jnanasudha: Svadhyay ane Suchi in 1987, which is a critical and bibliographical study of writings published in Jnanasudha.

== See also ==
- List of Gujarati-language magazines
