= Sumant Mehta =

Indian physician and independence activist

- Born: 1 July 1877; Surat
- Died: 15 December 1968 (aged 91)
- Education: MBChB
- Alma mater: Victoria University of Manchester
- Occupations: Social worker, physician, independence activist
- Spouse: Sharda Mehta (1898–1968)
- Children: Premlila Mehta, Sarla Mehta, Ramesh Sumant Mehta, Asoka Mehta, Indira Bhatt, Siddharth Mehta

Sumant Mehta (1 July 1877 – 15 December 1968) was a physician, independence activist and social worker from 20th-century India. Educated in London, he served as a personal physician of the Gaekwad rulers of Baroda State before entering public life in 1921. Along with his wife Sharda Mehta, he was involved in social and political activities.

== Early life and education ==
Sumant Mehta was born in Surat on 1 July 1877 in a Vadnagara Nagar Brahmin family. His father Batukram Shobharam Mehta was a personal physician of the Sayajirao Gaekwad III of Baroda State and had studied in England. His mother Dahigauri belonged to Surat. He was a maternal grandson of Gujarati novelist Nandshankar Mehta.

He had his school education in Baroda and Bombay (now Mumbai). He studied at a medical college in Bombay for three years.

In 1898, he married Sharda Mehta. He was a medical student at the time of their marriage and was four years older than her. After getting married he later, left for Manchester, England for further studies. He completed his medical education and received MBChB from Victoria University of Manchester in 1901.

== Career ==
When his father died in 1903, he joined as a personal physician of Gaekwad. He also served as a Sanitary Commissioner of the Baroda State. He served as a medical officer in Baroda and Navsari. Along with Gaekwad, he travelled to China, Japan, Germany, France, England, US and Canada in 1910–11 which broadened his perspectives. He was influenced by the religious texts and works of Ramkrishna Paramhansa, Swami Vivekananda and Omar Khayyam. He was also influenced by Maharani of Baroda Chimnabai II. He attended the Indian National Congress in Calcutta (now Kolkata) in 1906. Influenced by Gopal Krishna Gokhale, he joined the Servants of India Society and decided to spend the rest of his life in public service in 1915. He left his services to the Gaekwads and entered public life in 1921 with his wife.

In 1923, he also served as the president of Gujarat Kisan Sabha held at Sojitra. He participated in the relief work of the flood in Gujarat in 1927. He was in charge of the Sarbhon camp with his wife during the 1928 Bardoli Satyagraha. He organised a youth conference in 1929. Under his presidency, the 8th and 13th conferences of the Baroda Praja Mandal (Baroda People's Association) were held in 1930 in Navsari, and in May 1936 in Kathor village near Navsari respectively. He established an Ashram in Shertha village near Kalol in 1936.

He worked for the welfare of farmers, labourers and tribal people. With Indulal Yagnik, he organised a rally of farmers during the Indian National Congress in Haripura in 1938.

During his Europe trip, he had met Indian revolutionaries like Madam Cama, Shyamji Krishna Verma and Virendranath Chattopadhyaya. He was arrested and imprisoned in Jalalpore Jail for his participation in the civil disobedience movement. He spent five years in the jails of Sabarmati, Visapur and Nashik for his participation in the independence movement.

He wrote an autobiography titled Atmakatha which was posthumously published in 1971. His other works include Samajdarpan and Hali: Jameenna Gulamo. He had described Hali, a form of slavery of the tribals in the latter. He has referred to tribal people as Raniparaj (lit. 'people of the forest') in his works.

== Death ==
He died on 15 December 1968.

== See also ==
- List of Gujarati-language writers
