= Vinod Meghani =

Indian translator and editor (1935–2009)

Vinod Meghani (3 May 1935 – 15 February 2009) was an Indian translator and editor from Gujarat, India. He was the son of Gujarati writer Jhaverchand Meghani. He translated several Gujarati literary works into English, including works by his father and other Gujarati writers.

== Life and works ==
Meghani was born on 3 May 1935 in Mumbai. He was the eldest among the nine children of Jhaverchand Meghani and Chitradevi.

He is known to Gujarati readers for his Gujarati translation of Irving Stone's biographical novel about the Dutch painter Vincent van Gogh, Lust for Life, published in 1994 as Salagta Soorajmukhi. The work became popular among Gujarati readers.

Meghani translated several works by his father, Jhaverchand Meghani, into English. His translation of the classic Gujarati novel Mansai Na Deeva was published as Earthen Lamps in 2004. The translation was prescribed for postgraduate students at Karnataka University for four years, until 2007. He also translated Sorath Tara Vehtan Paani as Echoes from Geer. He selected and translated 31 stories from Saurashtra ni Rasadhar, which were published in three volumes: The Shade Crimson (2003), A Ruby Shattered (2003), and Noble Heritage (2003). One of the translated stories, Word of Honor, received the Katha Prize for literature in oral tradition.

Among his other translations were an abridged English version of the Gujarati novel Saraswatichandra by Govardhanram Tripathi, published in 2006, and Dhruv Bhatt's Samudrantike, translated as Oceanside Blues in 2001. He translated Hasmukh Baradi's Gujarati Theater no Itihas as A History of Gujarati Theatre, published in 2003. He translated his wife Himanshi Shelat's short-story collection Andhari Galima Safed Tapka into English as Frozen Whites in Dark Alley, published in 2007.

Meghani worked to promote reading among the public. He travelled to Mumbai and various towns in Gujarat with an exhibition of magazines to create awareness about reading periodicals.

He died on 15 February 2009 at Valsad from kidney disease.

== See also ==
- List of Gujarati-language writers
