= Kashino Dikro =

- Promotional poster
- Directed by: Kanti Madia
- Written by: Prabodh Joshi
- Produced by: Cine India International
- Starring: Rajiv; Ragini; Rita Bhaduri; Pranlal Kharsani
- Cinematography: Barun Mukherji
- Music by: Kshemu Divetia
- Release date: 1979
- Running time: 145 minutes
- Country: India
- Language: Gujarati

Kashino Dikro (transl. Kashi's son) is a 1979 Indian Gujarati film directed by Kanti Madia. Being the first and the only film of Madia, it starred Rajiv, Ragini, Rita Bhaduri, and Pranlal Kharsani. The film was produced by Cine India International and Naresh Patel. Adapted from Vinodini Nilkanth's short story Dariyav Dil, film's script and dialogues were written by Prabodh Joshi. Barun Mukherji was a cinematographer.

The film features music composed by Kshemu Divetia, who earned State Films Award in Best Music Director category for the film.

== Plot ==
Kashi (Ragini) is at the center of the story of the film. Kashi's marriage takes place in a prestigious family. Her mother-in-law entrusts the responsibility of her younger son Keshav to Kashi at the time of her death. Kashi raises her brother-in-law (Rajiv) and his own son Shambhu equally. As Keshav becomes young, he is married to Rama (Bhaduri), but on the wedding night, Keshav dies of snakebite. Kashi, who raises the widow sister-in-law like her own daughter, renounces worldly pleasures to share in her sorrows. Kashi's husband, suffering from the dissatisfaction of worldly happiness, takes advantage of widow Rama's loneliness at a weak moment and rapes Rama. Kashi decides to save her family's as well as Rama's honour by pretending to be a pregnant herself, and later adopts Rama's son as her own. In order to save the family's pride in the society, Kashi goes on a pilgrimage with her sister-in-law, keeping the news of herself being pregnant. After child birth, Kashi returns home with the baby and Rama. In the end, Kashi lying on a death bed, dies by handing over her adopted child to Rama.

== Cast ==
The cast was:

- Rajiv
- Ragini
- Rita Bhaduri
- Girish Desai
- Pranlal Kharsani
- Tarla Joshi
- Leela Jariwala
- Vatsala Deshmukh
- Mahavir Shah
- Arvind Vaidya
- Saroj Nayak
- Jagdish Shah
- Pushpa Shah
- Javed Khan
- Shrikant Soni
- Dilip Patel
- Kanti Madia

== Sound track ==
Kashino Dikro features songs written by Balmukund Dave, Ravji Patel, Madhav Ramanuj, Anil Joshi, and Ramesh Parekh.

Kashino Dikro

Soundtrack album by Kshemu Divetia
- Released: 1979
- Genre: Feature film soundtrack
- Length: 17:13
- Label: Saregama

Track list
No.	Title	Lyrics	Singer(s)	Length
1.	"Gormane Panche Angaliye"	Ramesh Parekh	Harshida Raval	3:26
2.	"Rudiana Raja"	Balmukund Dave	Harshida Raval, Janardan Rawal	1:51
3.	"Zina Zina Re Ankhethi Amne"	Anil Joshi	Kaumudi Munshi, Vibha Desai	4:01
4.	"Roi Roi Ansoo"	Madhav Ramanuj	Vibha Desai	2:19
5.	"Mari Aankhe Kankuna Suraj"	Ravji Patel	Rasbihari Desai	5:36
Total length:				17:13

The song "Gormane Panche Angaliye" became very popular.
