= Hasmukh Baradi =

Indian playwright and theater artist (1938–2017)

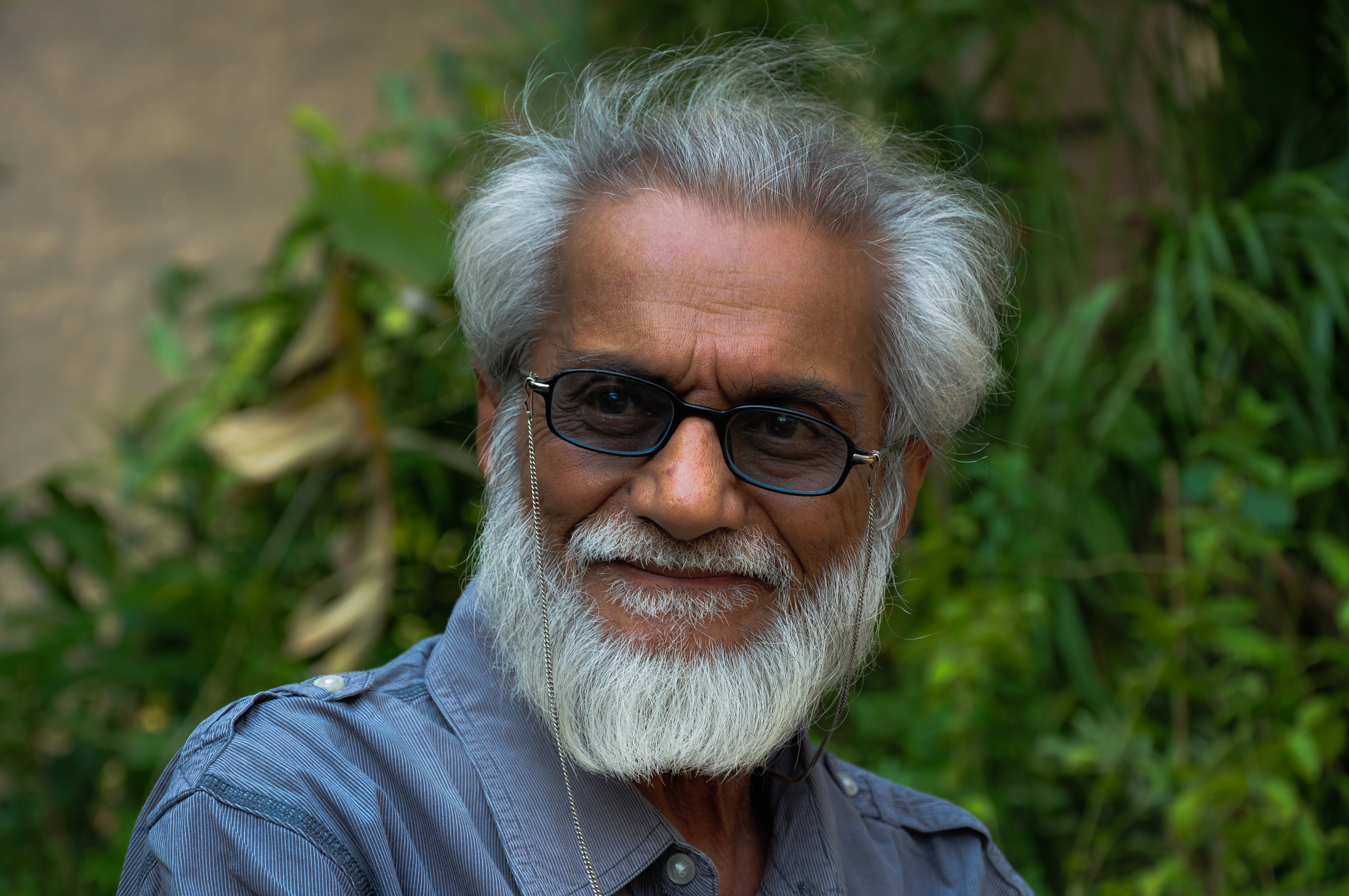
- Baradi in 2010
- Born: Hasmukh Jamnadas Baradi; 23 December 1938; Rajkot, Gujarat, India
- Died: 4 February 2017 (aged 78); Ahmedabad, Gujarat, India
- Education: Master of Arts (M.A)
- Occupations: Playwright; theater artist; theater critic
- Spouse: Jyoti
- Children: 1
- Writing career
- Language: Gujarati
- Notable work: The History of Gujarati Theatre; Raino Darpanrai

Hasmukh Jamnadas Baradi (23 December 1938 – 4 February 2017) was a distinguished Gujarati playwright, theater artist, theater critic, and a Russian language expert from India. Over his career, Baradi authored more than two dozen plays, with six premiering at prestigious venues such as the Central Sangeet Natak Academy and the National School of Drama Festivals. He also penned the "History of Gujarati Theatre" which was published by the National Book Trust in New Delhi in 1996, and later translated into English by Vinod Meghani in 2003.

== Early life and education ==
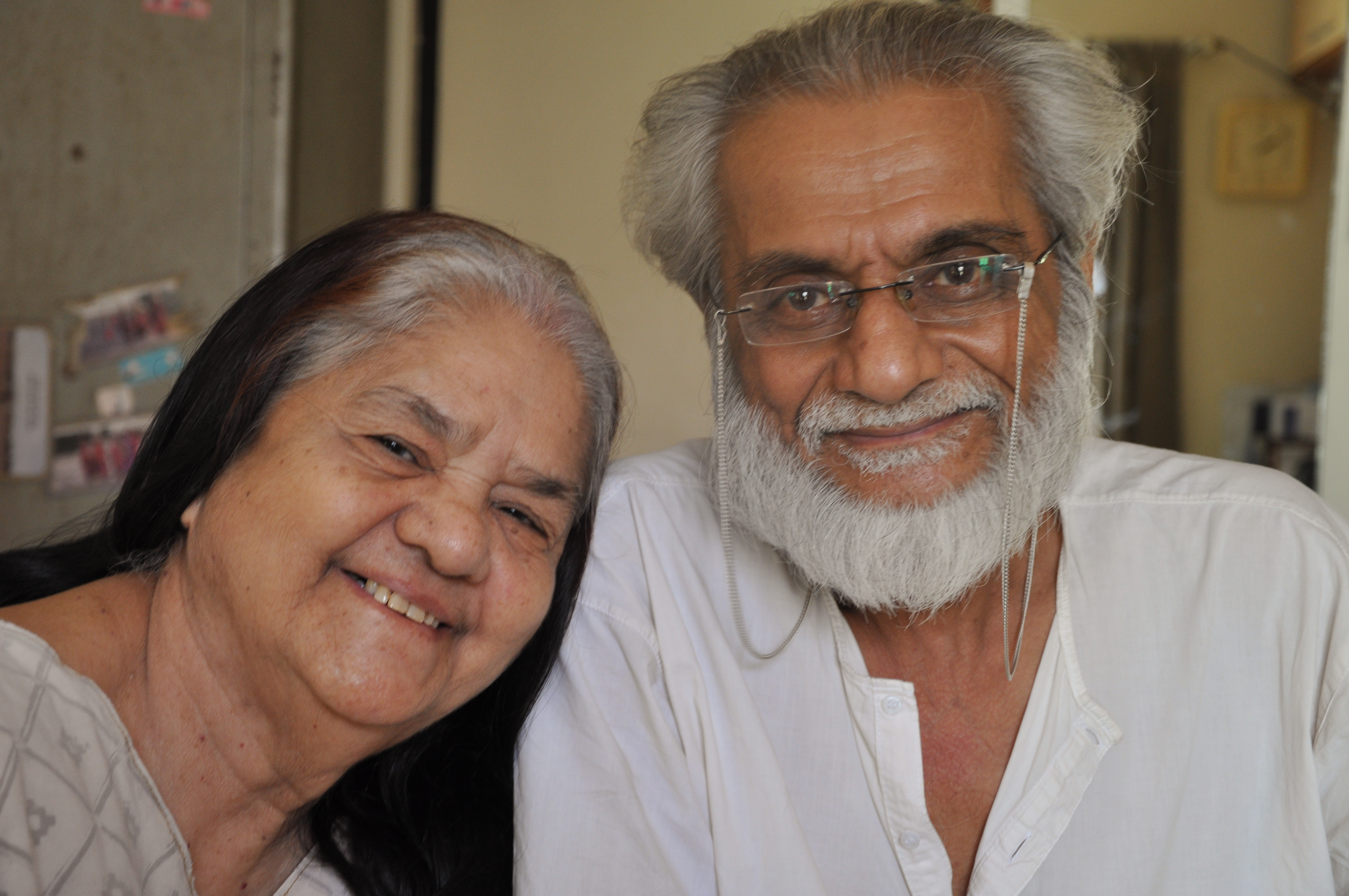
Baradi with his wife Jyoti in 2011

Baradi was born on 23 December 1938 in Rajkot. After completing his primary and secondary education in Rajkot, he received a diploma in theater direction from Saurashtra Sangit Natak Academy in 1961. Afterwards, he joined the Gujarat University, where he earned a Bachelor of Arts in 1964 in English literature and Sanskrit. He received a Master of Arts in Theater History from Lunacharsky State Institute for Theatre Arts, Moscow in 1972. From 1959 to 1964, he worked as a playwright at Aakashvani in Vadodara and Rajkot.

== Works ==
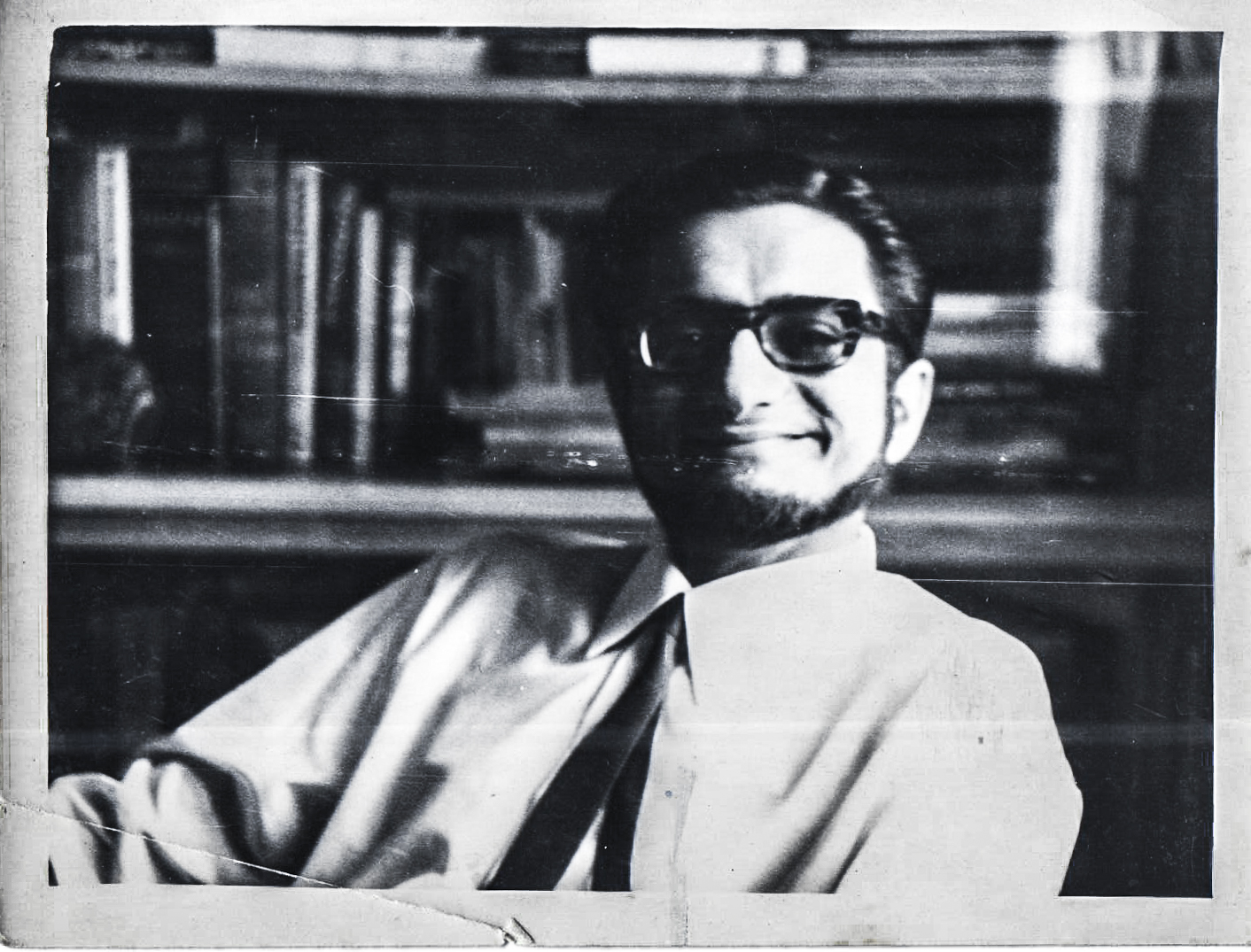
Baradi in 1970s at Moscow

Baradi attempted a fusion of tradition and modernity in his plays. He ran the Garage Studio Theater, which performed in Bhavai theatrical style, a traditional folk theatrical form particularly common in Western India. He wrote many plays within the Bhavai form which delved on topics of social reforms.

Baradi wrote Kalo Kamlo (lit. Black Blanket), an experimental psychological play which he had published in 1975, and was translated into Hindi in 1980 as Kala Kambal. He also wrote Raino Darpanrai, an adaptation of Raino Parvat, as well as Baradina Be Natako (1984), Janardan Joseph (1985), Pachhi Shebaji Bolia, Jashumati Kankuvati, Eklu Aakash ane Bija Natako, Tame Aanathi Ramtata and Akhu Aikhu Farithi. In addition, Baradi translated Uncle Vanya by Anton Chekhov into Gujarati as Vanya Mama (1983).

In 1983, Baradi wrote Natak Sarikho Nadar Hunnar (1983), a work of theater criticism. He also wrote Gujarati Theaterno Itihas, a literary history of Gujarati theater, which was translated into English by Vinod Meghani as The History of Gujarati Theatre in 2004.

== List of Published Work ==
Year	Publication Title	Author/Writer Name	ISBN NO.
2015	Gandhari Ane 100 Kundo	Hasmukh Baradi	978-93-82679-40-0
2015	Natyarshi Jashwant Thaker	Hasmukh Baradi	-
2014	Telephone: Aekanki	Hasmukh Baradi	978-93-8392-31-1
2014	"Suyodhan":Beanki	Hasmukh Baradi	-
2014	Rang Parivrajak Goverdhan Panchal, Jivanrekha	Hasmukh Baradi	-
2014	Karmashil Vidhvan Goverdhan Panchal	Hasmukh Baradi	978-81-922546-2-3
2014	Film Madhyam Ane Nirman Kala	Hasmukh Baradi	978-93-81265-84-0
2014	Bengali Theatre	Kiranmay Raha | Translation: Hasmukh Baradi	978-81-237-7083-3
2011	Televishan Karyakarm - Nirman Ane Madhyam Parichay (Reprint)	Hasmukh Baradi	-
2010	"Jashumati Kankuvati"-Beanki Padyanatak	Hasmukh Baradi	-
2010	"Sahu Ne Aek Ganika Joye, Urfe…Shakar Mahaavtar, Aparampara…'(Beanki)	Hasmukh Baradi	978-81-8440-396-1
2010	Augosto Boal	Hasmukh Baradi	-
2010	Triji Disha (Varta Sangrah)	Hasmukh Baradi	978-93-80294-53-7
2009	"Baradi Na Tran Natako"	Hasmukh Baradi	978-93-80294-46-9
2009	Two Plays In English -('Shakar' and Jashumati Kankuvati')	Hasmukh Baradi	-
2009	"Rangbhoomi Parva"	Hamukh Baradi	978-81-8480-247-4
2005	Theare Name Dhatana	Hasmukh Baradi	-
2003	"History Of Gujarati Theatre"	Hamukh Baradi, Translation: Vinod Meghani	81-237-4032-8
2002	"Natak Deshvideshman"	Dr.Dhirubhai Thaker & Hasmukh Baradi	-
2000	"Abhinaykala" - Jasvant Thakar	Sampadan/Edited by Hasmukh Baradi	-
1998	"Flash Back"	Rasiklal Vakil & Hasmukh Baradi	-
1998	Chehaf Na Faras Natako	Anton Chekhov | Translation: Hasmukh Baradi	81-7227-036-4
1997	Gujarati Theatre no Itihas	Hasmukh Baradi	81-237-1995-7
1997	Gujarat Na Jyotidharo: Jasvant Thakar	Editor : Hasmukh Baradi	-
1997	Cross Fade (Stories)	Hasmukh Baradi	-
1997	Film Nirman Ane Kala	Hasmukh Baradi	-
1997	TV-Radio-Samuh Madhyam	Hasmukh Baradi	-
1997	Aengal Camera No Ane Jivanno	Hasmukh Baradi	-
1997	Madhyam Saksharta	Hasmukh Baradi	-
1995	"Baradi Nan Be Natako" ("Pachhi Robajee Bolya" - Trianki, Ane "Jasumati Kankuvati"-Beanki)	Hasmukh Baradi	-
1995	Natak Sarikho Nadar Hunnar (Natyalekho) (Reprint)	Hasmukh Baradi	
1995	"Janardhan Joseph" Beanki	Hasmukh Baradi	-
1995	"Teer-no-Sannanat"-Aekanki Sangrah	Hasmukh Baradi	-
1994	Bertolt Brecht - a monogram	Hasmukh Baradi	-
1994	Gandhari (Ladhunval)	Hasmukh Baradi	-
1993	Televishan Karyakarm - Nirman Ane Madhyam Parichay	Hasmukh Baradi	-
1993	Antral	Jean Genet - Hasmukh Baradi Digdarshan : Janak Rawal	-
1989	"Rai No Darpan Rai" Beanki	Hasmukh Baradi	-
1988	Sachukalo Manas	Hasmukh Baradi, Bela Trivedi	5-25-001796-3
1987	"Akelo Aakash" (Sindhi)	Hasmukh Baradi	-
1986	Sinduria Sadh	Hasmukh Baradi	5-05-000135-8
1986	Lukomorya	Hasmukh Baradi	5-05-000756-9
1985	"Eklun Akash And Bijan Natako" Beanki	Hasmukh Baradi	-
1985	Mara Viswavidhyalayo	Hasmukh Baradi	5-05-000134-x
1983	Natak Sarikho Nadar Hunnar (Natyalekho)	Hasmukh Baradi	-
1983	Vanyamama	Anton Chekhov, Translation: Hasmukh Baradi	-
1974	"Kalo Kamlo" Beanki	Hasmukh Baradi	-

== Death ==
He died on 4 February 2017 in Ahmedabad. His daughter, Manvita Baradi, is a director, theater teacher, and architect in Ahmedabad.

== Awards ==
Baradi received the Narmad Suvarna Chandrak in 1987 for writing Raino Darpanrai (1986), and received Kumar Suvarna Chandrak in 1981 for his overall contributions to Gujarati theater. He received Critics' Award of 1988 for Raino Darpanrai. He was also awarded Chandravadan Mehta Award-2000, for lifetime achievement.
