= Kshemu Divetia =

Indian music composer and singer

- Born: Kshemendra Viramitra Divetia; 1 October 1924
- Died: 30 July 2009 (aged 84); Ahmedabad, Gujarat, India
- Occupations: Composer, singer

Kshemendra Viramitra Divetia (1 October 1924 – 30 July 2009) was an Indian music composer and singer from Gujarat, India. He composed music for Gujarati language film Kashino Dikro which brought him Best Music Director Award of the state government. Government of Gujarat awarded him the Gujarat Gaurav Puraskar for his contribution to Gujarati music. He also received Avinash Vyas award from Morari Bapu.

== Biography ==
Born on 1 October 1924, Divetia took his training under Jaysukhlal Bhojak, Hamid Hussain Khan and V. R. Athavale. He began to compose song while working with Akashvani, All India Radio, Shrutivrund and the Rangmandal Drama Institute in the 1950s.

In 1984, he produced 'Sangitsudha', a compilation of 10 album which consist of songs written by 35 poets and sung by 26 artists. He died on 30 July 2009 in Ahmedabad. His wife Sudhaben was a singer, and they composed several songs in collaboration.

== Discography ==
Some of his best known songs are:

- Radhanu Naam Tame
- Dariyama Hoy Ene Moti Kahevay
- Goramane Paanche Aangaliye Pujya
- Mari Aankhe Kankuna Suraj Aathamya
