= Himanshi Shelat =

Indian Gujarati-language author (Born: 1947)

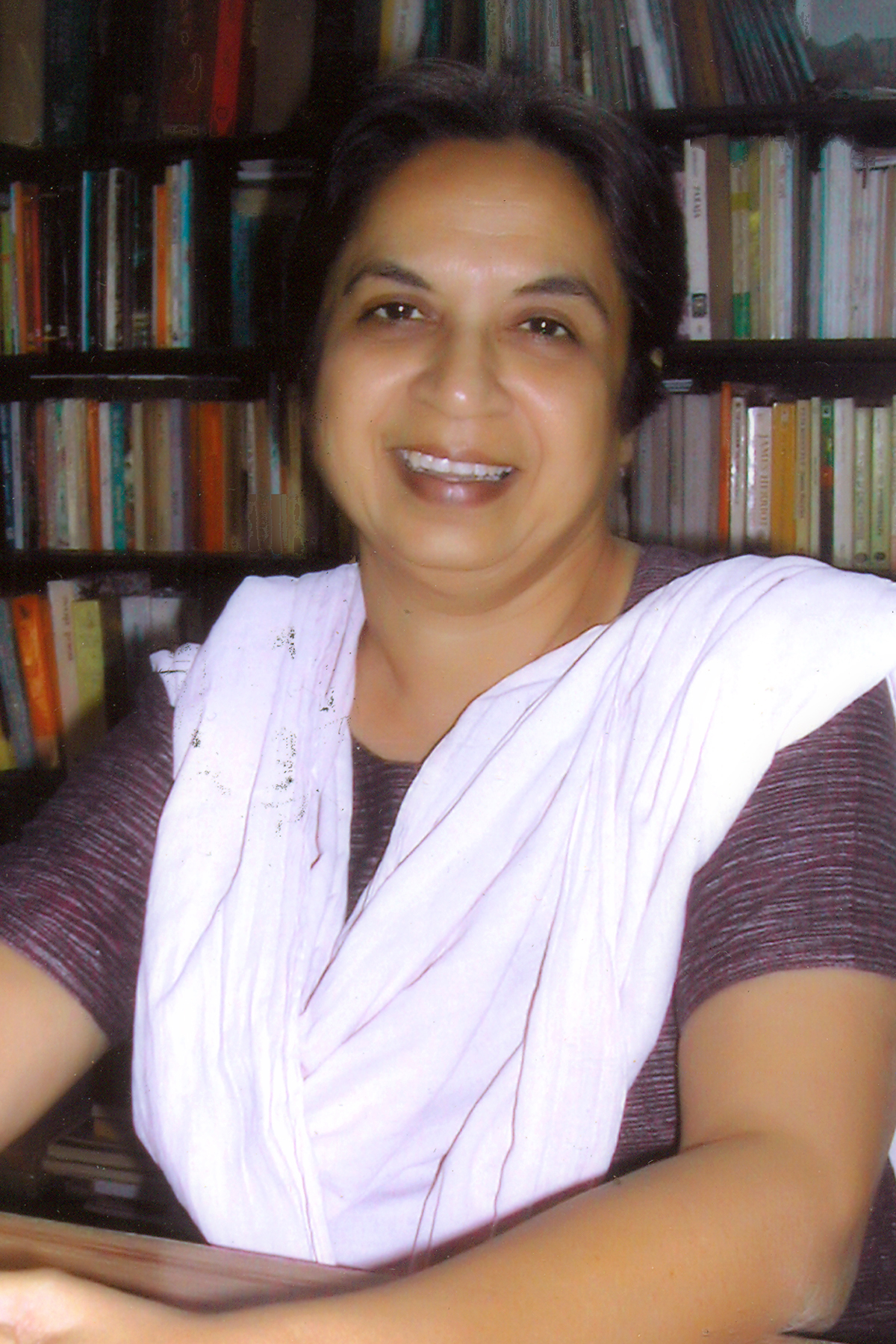
- Shelat in April 2006
- Born: Himanshi Indulal Shelat; 8 January 1947 (age 79); Surat, Gujarat
- Education: M.A., Ph.D.
- Occupation: Short story writer
- Spouse: Vinod Meghani (1995 - 2009)
- Relatives: Jhaverchand Meghani (father in law)
- Writing career
- Language: Gujarati
- Notable work: Andhari Galima Safed Tapakan (1992)
- Notable awards: Sahitya Akadami Award (1996)

Signature
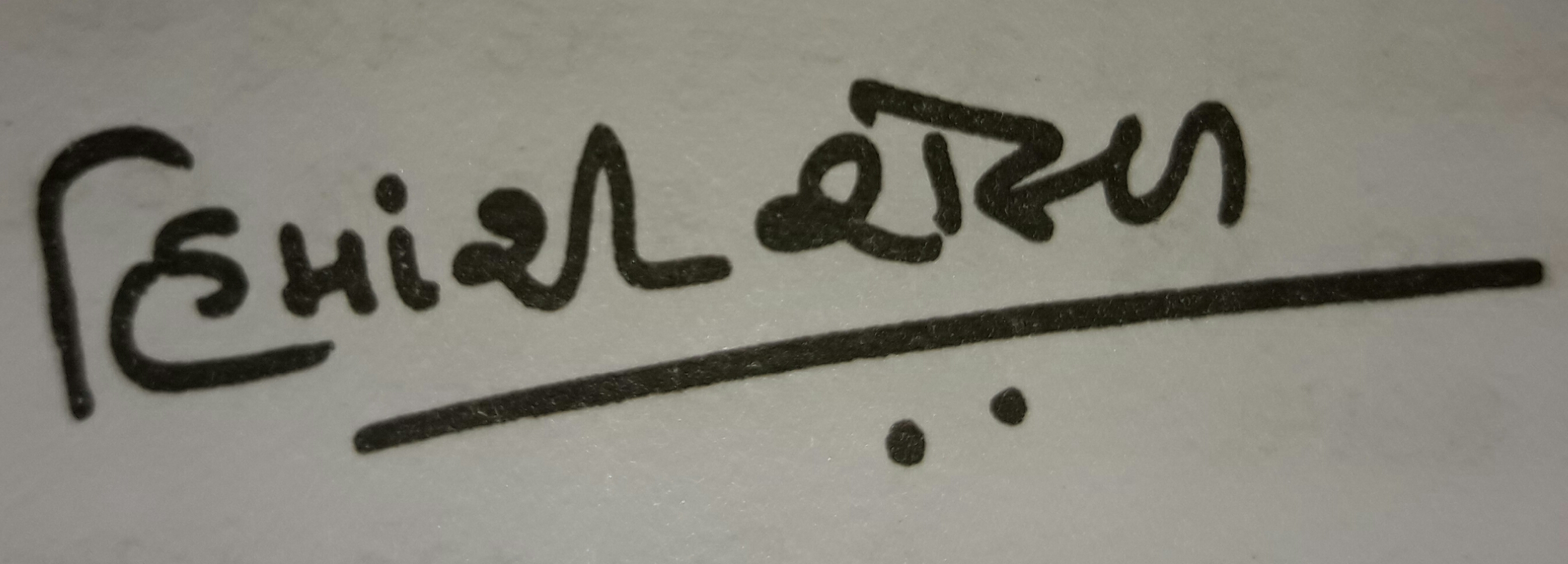

Himanshi Indulal Shelat (born 8 January 1947) is a Gujarati author from Gujarat, India. She received Sahitya Akademi Award for Gujarati in 1996 for her short stories collection Andhari Galima Safed Tapakan (1992).

== Life ==
She was born on 8 January 1947 in Surat, Gujarat. She completed Bachelor of Arts in 1966 and Master of Arts in 1968. She obtained her Ph.D. on "V.S. Naipaul's novel" in 1981–82. She taught English literature at M.T.B. Arts College, Surat from 1968 to her voluntary retirement in October 1994. She served as an advisory board member in Sahitya Akademi for 2013–2017.

She married Vinod Meghani, son of renowned Gujarati writer Jhaverchand Meghani, on 4 October 1995. Vinod Meghani died on 15 February 2009.

== Works ==
She wrote her first story Saat Pagathiya Andhara Koovama in 1978 and published in Navneet, a Gujarati magazine. Later the story was published as the best short story in Milap, a magazine published from Bhavnagar. She is influenced by Indian authors such as Mahasweta Devi, Ashapoorna Devi, Phanishwar Nath 'Renu' and Jaywant Dalvi as well as English authors such as Jane Austen and George Eliot.

Antaral, her first anthology of short stories, published in 1987 was followed by, Andhari Galima Safed Tapaka (1992), Ae Loko (1997), Sanjno Samay (2002), Panchavayka (2002), Khandaniyama Mathu (2004) and Garbhagatha (2009). Aathamo Rang (2001), Kyarima Aakash Pushpa ane Kala Patangiya (2006) and Saptadhara (2012) are three of her novels while Ekadani Chaklio (2004) and Dabe Hathe (2012) are her collections of essays. Her reminiscent writings are published as Platform number 4 (1998) and Victor (1999) while her literary criticism is published as Paravastavavad (Surrealism; 1987) and Gujarati Kathasahityama Narichetna (Women consciousness in Gujarati prose; 2000). Sunkarma Upsati Chhabio (2026) are pen-portraits.

Swami Ane Sai (1993), Antar-Chhabi (1998) and Pehlo Akshar (2005) are edited by her. Nokha Mijajno Anokho Chitrakar (Mahendra Desai) (2004) is her work of translation.

== Awards ==
She received Sahitya Akadami Award for Gujarati in 1996 for her short story collection Andhari Galima Safed Tapakan (1992). The same book also received prize from Gujarati Sahitya Parishad. She received the 2024 Kuvempu Rashtriya Puraskar (Kuvempu National Award).

== See also ==
- List of Gujarati-language writers

Awards
Preceded by Varsha Adalja	Recipient of the Sahitya Akademi Award winners for Gujarati; 1996	Succeeded by Ashokpuri Goswami
