= Harshida Raval =

Indian singer

Harshida Raval was a singer from Gujarat, India. She had worked as a playback singer in Gujarati cinema as well as Sugam Sangeet and devotional music. She died on 24 July 2017 at Ahmedabad.

== Life ==
Rawal was born in Limdi, Gujarat to Manishankar Vyas. Her talent was first recognised in a programme of Shruti Sanstha when she sang "Keva Re Malela Manna Mel?", which was later used in the Gujarati film Kashino Dikro. She married fellow musician Janardan Raval.

== Career ==
Rawal sang several songs with Avinash Vyas. She had won as the Best Playback Singer Award five times, awarded by Government of Gujarat. Her popular Gujarati songs include "E Ke Lal Darwaje Tambu Taniya Re Lol", "Hu To Gai'ti Melama", "Haju Rasbhar Rat To Baki Rahi Gai", "Mara Sheriethi Kankunwar Avata Re Lol", "Maro Sonano Ghaduliyo Re", "Gormane Panch Angalie Pujya".

Influenced by Chaitanya Mahaprabhu in her later life, she sung devotional songs (Bhajans) of saint-poets such as Meera, Kabir, Surdas and Tulsidas.
