= Sarbhon =

Sarbhon surbhuvan
- village
- Nickname: harbhon
- Location in Gujarat, India Sarbhon (India)
- Coordinates: 21.0500°N 73.0833°E
- Country: India
- State: Gujarat
- District: Surat
- Elevation: 68 m (223 ft)

Population (2014)
  - Total: 4,476 (as per 2,011 census)

Languages
  - Official: Gujarati, Hindi
- Time zone: UTC+5:30 (IST)
- PIN: 394350
- Telephone code: 91-26-22-253xxx/254xxx
- Vehicle registration: GJ19*
- Website: gujaratindia.com

Sarbhon is a village in the municipality of Bardoli in Surat district in the state of Gujarat, India. It is located about 10 km south of Bardoli, situated on the State Highway 88 between National Highway 8 and National Highway 6. Surat Airport is the nearest airport and Bardoli Railway Station is the nearest railhead. Original name of the village is believed to be Shree Bhuvan (House of Devas/Rishis) which later became Sur Bhavan before taking its current form Sarbhon.

== Education ==
There are two schools in Sarbhon:

- Kasturba Prathmik Shala (From Standard 1 through to Standard 9)
- N B Patel Sabhon Vibhag Sarvajanik High School (Standard 1 through to Standard 10 and Standard 11-12 with Commerce/Arts Streams)

== Details ==
The native language of Sarbhon is Gujarati and most of the village people speak Gujarati . Sarbhon people use Gujarati language for communication.

- The nearest railway station in and around Sarbhon:

The nearest railway station to Sarbhon is Bardoli which is located in and around 9.0 kilometer distance. The following table shows other railway stations and its distance from Mamakudi. Bardoli railway station 9.0 km. Gangadhara railway station 10.4 km. Bagumra railway station 14.0 km. Chalthan railway station 17.7 km. Madhi railway station 19.2 km.

- Nearest airport to Sarbhon:

Sarbhon's nearest airport is Surat Airport situated at 36.4 km distance. Few more airports around Sarbhon are as follows. Surat Airport 36.4 km. Daman Airport 73.5 km. Bhavnagar Airport 121.2 km.

- Nearest town/city to Sarbhon:

Sarbhon's nearest town/city/important place is Mahuva located at the distance of 6.9 kilometer. Surrounding town/city/TP/CT from Sarbhon are as follows. Mahuva 6.9 km. Bardoli 8.1 km. Chalthan 17.6 km. Kadodara 18.2 km. Mahuvar 21.5 km.

- Schools in and around Sarbhon:

Sarbhon nearest schools has been listed as follows. N G Patel School 4.2 km. Adarsh School Vanesa Gaam 6.1 km. Pardipata School And High School 6.5 km. Gotasa Primary School Kirtika Patel Principal 2 6.8 km. G H Bhakta School Ground 7.0 km.

== See also ==
- List of tourist attractions in Surat
