= Vaikunthbhai Mehta =

Indian politician (1891–1964)

- Born: 26 October 1891; Bhavnagar, Bombay Presidency, British India
- Died: 27 October 1964 (aged 73); Pune, India
- Organization(s): Maharashtra State Cooperative Bank, Indian National Congress(INC)
- Movement: Indian Cooperative Movement

Vaikunthbhai Lallubhai Mehta (26 October 1891 – 27 October 1964) was a pioneer leader of Indian Cooperative Movement. Vaikunthbhai was born at Bhavnagar in Bombay Presidency. Vaikunthbhai served the Bombay State Cooperative Bank, now Maharashtra State Cooperative Bank as Chief Executive for an uninterrupted period of about 35 years. He was the Minister of Finance and Cooperation of the then Bombay State and was the first Chairman of Khadi and Village Industries Commission.

== Contribution in co-operative movement ==
The contribution of Vaikunthbhai Mehta to the cause of Cooperative Education and Training was pioneering and foundational. He said, "Cooperative Training is not merely a prerequisite but a permanent condition of cooperative activities". Many leaders where influenced by his work in Cooperative sector; Leaders such as, Yashwantrao Chavan- Pioneer of Maharashtra, Dr. Verghese Kurien-Chairman of Amul India, Gulabrao Patil-Cooperative Leader of Maharashtra and many such leaders took Cooperative Movement further in India.

== VAMNICOM ==
As a tribute to and memory of the great Cooperative leader and philosopher, the national Institute has been named after him, as Vaikunth Mehta National Institute of Cooperative Management (VAMNICOM) in Pune, Maharashtra state, India. The Vaikunth Mehta National Institute of co-operative Management (VAMNICOM) is conceived as an intellectual nerve centre for the co-operative movement and has been functioning as the apex management training institute for over 50 years, catering to the management development, training, research and consultancy needs of various co-operative organisations, government departments and other national bodies.

== Memorial ==
The National Cooperative Union of India organizes annual Vaikunthbhai Mehta Memorial Lectures in New Delhi in tribute to his work with the Indian Cooperative Movement.
