= Vinodini Nilkanth =

Indian writer, translator and academic (1907-1987)

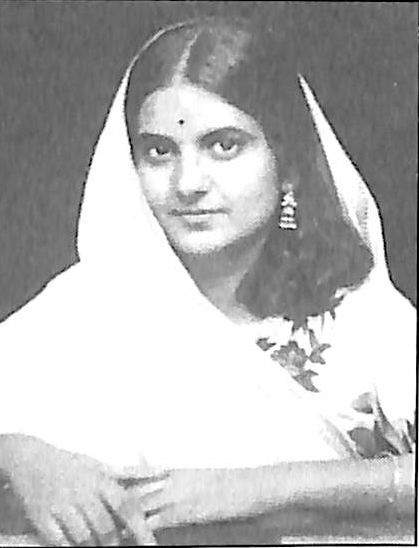
- Born: 9 February 1907; Ahmedabad, Bombay Presidency
- Died: 29 September 1987 (aged 80)
- Occupations: professor, writer, translator
- Parents: Ramanbhai Nilkanth (father); Vidyagauri Nilkanth (mother)
- Relatives: Sarojini Mehta (sister)

Vinodini Ramanbhai Nilkanth (9 February 1907 – 29 September 1987) was an Indian Gujarati writer, translator, and academic. She wrote novels, essays, short stories, journalist columns, and children's literature.

== Early life ==
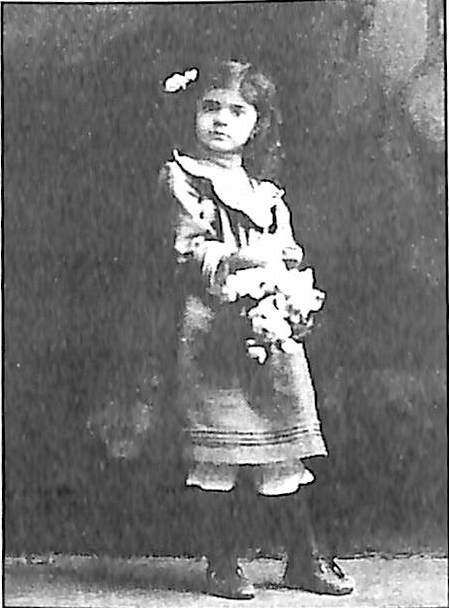
Vinodini around 1914

Vinodini Nilkanth was born in Ahmedabad, then part of the Bombay Presidency. Her father was Ramanbhai Nilkanth, a Gujarati novelist and politician. Her mother, Vidyagauri Nilkanth, was a social reformer and educator, and one of the first women in Gujarat to graduate from university. Both of her parents were writers, as well as her sister Sarojini.

Vinodini attended primary school at Mahalakshmi Training College. She went to secondary school at Government Girls High School. In 1928, she completed her Bachelor of Arts with English as her primary subject and Gujarati as a secondary language. In 1930, she went to University of Michigan to study for her Masters in Social Science and Education.

== Career ==
Vinodini Nilkanth was chief of the Vanita Vishram, an institute in Ahmedabad. She was also the Headmistress of the Municipal Girls High School in Ahmedabad. Later she became a professor at the S. N. D. T Mahila Pathshala. She also wrote columns in newspapers. She was a member of the executive committee of the Gujarat Vidhya Sabha.

== Works ==
Nilkanth published her first book of essays in her teens. Her short stories revealed her penetration of the human mind, particular the mind of a woman.

=== Personal essays ===
- Rasadwara (1928)
- Nijananda

=== Short story collections ===
- Aarasini Bhitarma (1942)
- Karpasi ane Biji Vartao
- Dil Dariavna Moti (1958)
- Angulino Sparsh (1965)

=== Novel ===
- Kadalivan

=== Children's literature ===
- Shishuranjana (1950)
- Mendini Manjari (1956)
- Balakoni Duniyama Dokiyu
- Safarachand (1964)
- Padchand Kathiyaro (1964)

=== Other writings ===
- Gharno Vahivat (1959)
- Bal Suraksha (1961)
- Gujarati Atakono Itihas (1942)
- Muktajanoni Bhoomi (1966).

=== Translations ===
In addition to her own literary work, Nilkanth translated Jane Austen's Pride and Prejudice into Gujarat. She also published Sukhni Siddhi, a translation of Bertrand Russell's The Conquest of Happiness.

=== Journalistic writings ===
From 1949, she wrote a column Ghar Gharni Jyoti in a daily paper, Gujarat Samachar, which became very popular. Her journalistic writings as a columnist have been published in five volumes: Ghar Gharni Jyot part 1, 2, 3 & 4 (1955, 1958, 1964 & 1969). The last one, Ghar Diwdi, (1987) was published after her death.

=== Adaptation ===
Nilkanth's short story Dariyav Dil was adapted into Gujarati film Kashino Dikro (1979) directed by Kanti Madia.

== Awards ==
Her short story collections Dil Dariavna Moti won the Gujarat Sahitya Sabha Award, and her work Angulino Sparsh won the Gujarat government award.

== See also ==
- List of Gujarati-language writers
