= Bhadrambhadra =

1900 Gujarati humorous novel by Ramanbhai Neelkanth

- Book cover
- Author: Ramanbhai Neelkanth
- Original title: ભદ્રંભદ્ર
- Language: Gujarati
- Genre: Humorous novel
- Published: 1900
- Publication place: India
- OCLC: 26376533
- Dewey Decimal: 891.477
- Original text: ભદ્રંભદ્ર at Gujarati Wikisource

Bhadrambhadra (pronounced [bʰə.drəm.bʰə.drə]) is a 1900 Gujarati satirical novel by Ramanbhai Neelkanth. It is regarded as the first humorous novel in Gujarati literature and as the first Gujarati novel written in the first person narrative. Ramanbhai used the novel to illustrate the ridiculousness of a highly orthodox view of Gujarati society and as a vehicle for social reform.

Although criticised for a lack of character development and a repetitiveness of situations, the novel has remained popular to this day. It has been republished numerous times and is currently in print in several languages. It is still common to nickname highly orthodox Sanskrit-accented Gujaratis after the eponymous protagonist.

== Overview ==
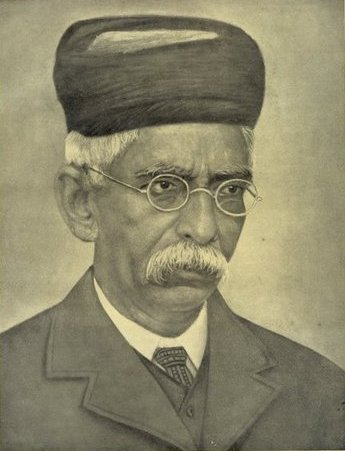
Ramanbhai Neelkanth

Bhadrambhadra is a 1900 Gujarati language satirical novel by Ramanbhai Neelkanth. It is regarded as the first humorous novel in Gujarati literature. The novel is influenced by The Pickwick Papers and Don Quixote. Ramanlal had a long running controversy with Manilal Dwivedi on numerous topics related to religion, philosophy, social reform, education and literature. Ramanlal was a liberal who was open to western influences while Manilal was an orthodox who opposed the western influences. Ramanbhai showed up the rigidity, pettiness, vanity and hypocrisy of these opponents of social reform in the book. Ramanbhai Neelkanth's enthusiasm for social reform was strongly influenced by his father, Mahipatram Rupram Nilkanth, an educationist and social reformer.

Bhadrambhadra was serialized from 1892 to 1900 in Jnanasudha, the organ of Ahmedabad Prarthana Samaj edited by Ramanbhai himself, and then published as a book in 1900 with further amendments. Ramanbhai wanted to publish the first edition with paintings but was unable to. In 1918 the third edition of the novel was published with illustrations by Ravishankar Raval. The 7th edition, published in 1953 with a preface by Jyotindra Dave, did not have illustrations; only photographs of Ramanbhai and Ambalal, the publisher, were included in it. Further editions were published without illustrations or photographs.

== Synopsis ==
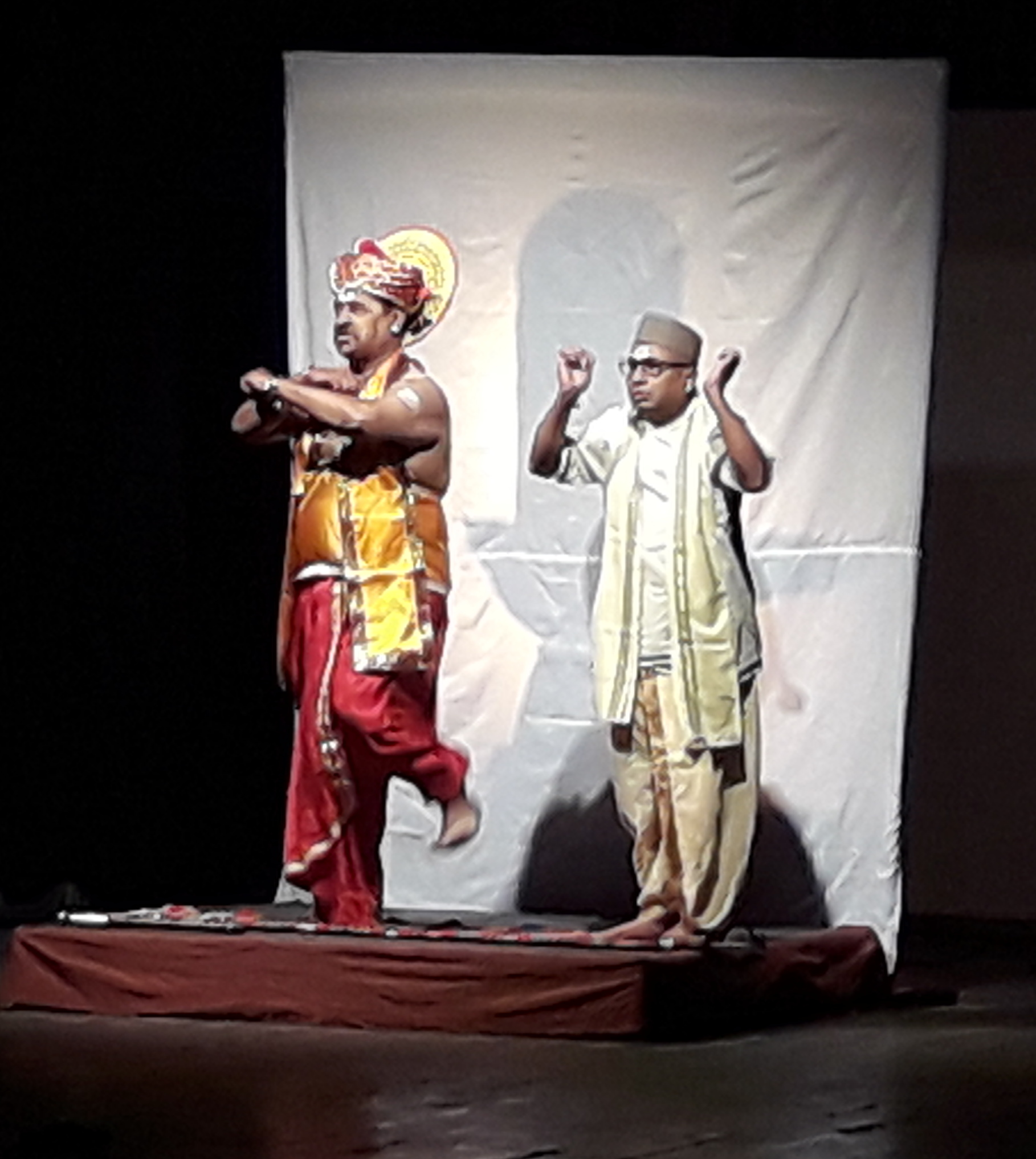
Performance of Bhadrambhadra at H. K Arts College, Ahmedabad; 1 September 2018

The novel is named after its protagonist, Bhadrambhadra. It is narrated in the first person by Ambaram Kevalram Modakiya, a pupil of Bhadrambhadra. It is the first Gujarati novel to be written in the first person narrative.

Bhadrambhadra is an orthodox Hindu Brahmin and an idiosyncratic person, who is opposed to anything that is non-traditional, non-Hindu, non-Sanskrit, non-Aryan or that is different from his traditional way of life or pattern of thoughts. Because of this, he changed his name from Daulat Shankar to Bhadrambhadra (lit. Good Good), as the word Daulat is non-Sanskrit, non-Indian and so, he felt, irreligious in origin. In the novel Bhadrambhadra speaks highly Sanskritised Gujarati and therefore is not able to make himself understood, which creates humorous situations.

== Reception and criticism ==
Bhadrambhadra is considered a classic of Gujarati literature and it was received well by readers and a number of critics. However, the Encyclopaedia of Indian Literature states that there is no development of character, and because of a lack of variety of situations and of behavior by the protagonist, the humour is not sustained throughout and the latter half of the book becomes uninteresting. K. M. Munshi gave a mixed review. He noted in Gujarat and Its Literature:

The story is poorly told in places and lacks organic unity. The work is rendered enjoyable by absurd situations and still funnier Samskritised Gujarati. Bhadrambhadra, the pretentious fool with his holy enthusiasm to secure the ever-rising glorious triumph of eternal Arya Dharma, is an immortal figure in Gujarati fiction.

Anandshankar Dhruv strongly criticized the novel and called it 'a barrier in social reform activities'.

== Legacy ==
During Ramanbhai's life, the character Bhadrambhadra became very popular and anybody who spoke Sanskritised Gujarati was nicknamed Bhadrambhadra. It is still a common nickname for any highly orthodox person.

In 1994, Gujarati humourist Ratilal Borisagar published a novel Sambhavami Yuge Yuge in which he represented Bhadrambahdra in contemporary milieu with light criticism of Sardar Sarovar Dam project. In 2014, he published another humorous novel Bhadrambhadra Amar Chhe focusing on gender equality. Gujarati writer Viththal Pandya wrote a short story "Bhadrambhadra Ane Hu" which brings Bhadrambhadra with him in contemporary milieu of 20th century in which they visit cinema and hotels in new sociopolitical climate. Gujarati columnist Urvish Kothari wrote a short novel titled "Bhadrambhadra" which is based on Bhadrambhadra's adventures in the Patidar reservation agitation of 2015.
