= Gujarat Pollution Control Board =

State pollution control board in India

- ગુજરાત પ્રદૂષણ નિયંત્રણ બોર્ડ

Agency overview
- Formed: 15 October 1974
- Jurisdiction: Government of Gujarat
- Headquarters: Gujarat Pollution Control Board Paryavaran Bhavan, Sector-10A, Gandhinagar-382010.
- Agency executive: R. B. Barad IAS, Chairman
- Website: https://gpcb.gujarat.gov.in/webcontroller/page/head-office

Gujarat Pollution Control Board (GPCB) is Gujarat state board. It was constituted the on 15 October 1974 by the Government of Gujarat with a view to protect the environment, prevent and control the pollution of water in Gujarat, that occupies a prominent niche in progressive and industrial development of the country. The Board has been over the years entrusted with the Central Acts and relevant Rules for pollution control as notified thereof from time to time.

GPCB has its Head Office in Gandhinagar, Gujarat and 27 Regional Offices in cities such as Ahmedabad, Bharuch, Bhavnagar, Godhra, Jamnagar, Mehsana, Rajkot, Surat, Vadodara and Vapi.

== See also ==
- Ramesh Sumant Mehta
- Awaaz Foundation Non-governmental organization in Mumbai India, works towards preserving and enhancing environment and for other socially oriented causes.
