= Sharda Mehta =

Indian social worker and writer (1882-1970)

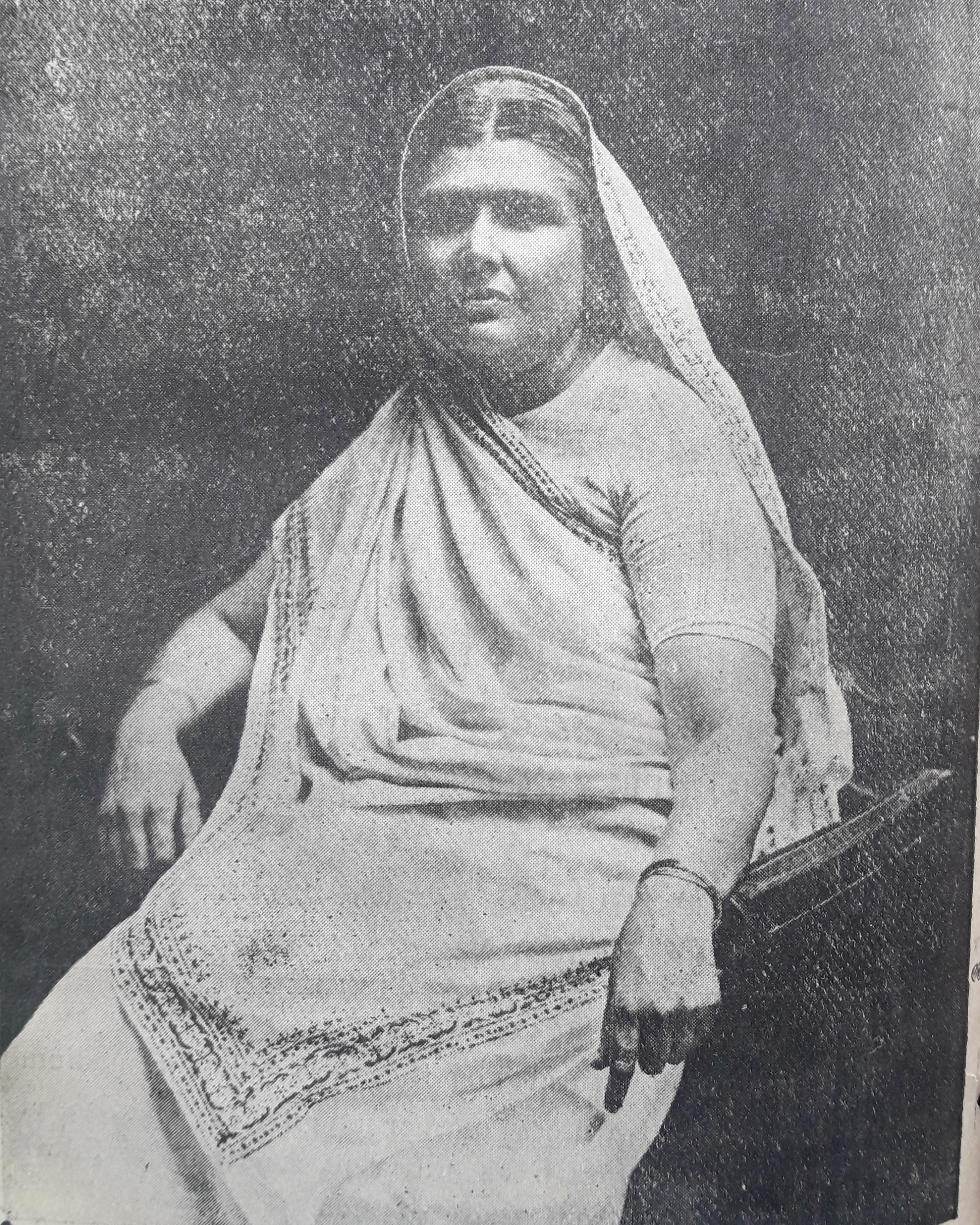
- Sharda Mehta
- Born: 26 June 1882; Ahmedabad, British India
- Died: 13 November 1970 (aged 88); Vallabh Vidyanagar, Gujarat, India
- Education: Bachelor of Arts
- Alma mater: Gujarat College
- Occupations: Social reformer, educationist and writer
- Spouse: Sumant Mehta (m. 1898; died 1968)
- Children: Premlila Mehta, Sarla Mehta, Ramesh Sumant Mehta, Asoka Mehta, Indira Bhatt, Siddharth Mehta
- Parents: Gopilal Manilal Dhruva (father); Balaben (mother)
- Relatives: Vidyagauri Nilkanth (sister)

Sharda Mehta (26 June 1882 – 13 November 1970) was an Indian social worker, proponent of women's education, and a Gujarati writer. She was among the first two women to graduate in what is now the modern state of Gujarat, India. She established institutes for women's education and women's welfare. She wrote several essays and an autobiography as well as translated some works.

== Early life and education ==
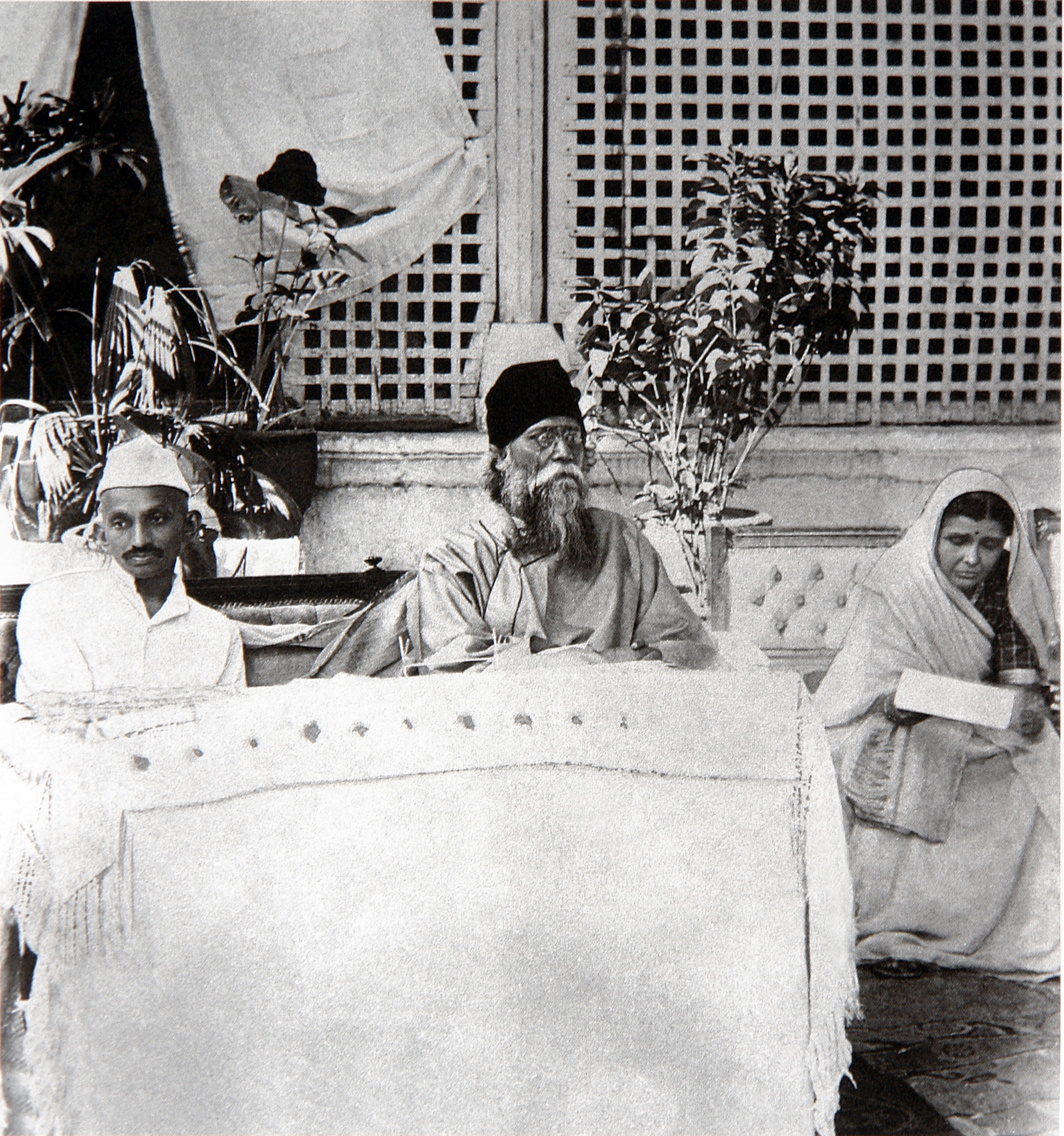
Sharda Mehta (right) with Mahatma Gandhi (left) and Rabindranath Tagore (centre) at Mahila Vidyalaya, Ahmedabad, 1920

Sharda was born to a family of social reformers, on 26 June 1882 in Ahmedabad. She was the daughter of a judicial officer, Gopilal Manilal Dhruva, and Balaben; a Nagar Brahmin family. She was a maternal great-granddaughter of Bholanath Divetia, a social reformer and poet.

She received her primary education at Raibahadur Maganbhai Girl's High School. She later joined Anglo-vernacular classes at the Mahalakshmi Teachers Training College and matriculated in 1897. She received her Bachelor of Arts in Logic and Moral Philosophy in 1901 from Gujarat College. She and her elder sister Vidyagauri Nilkanth were the first two women graduates in Gujarat.

== Personal life ==
She married Sumant Mehta in 1898. He was a medical student then and four years senior to her. He later served as a personal doctor of Gaekwads of Baroda State and as a social worker.

== Career ==
=== Social work ===
Mehta worked for social reforms and supported education, women's empowerment, opposition of caste restrictions, untouchability eradication, and Indian independence. She was influenced by Mahatma Gandhi. From 1906, she promoted swadeshi (domestic) goods and khadi clothes. She organised a protest against indentured servitude (Girmitiya) in 1917. She helped Indulal Yagnik in editing Navjivan in 1919.

She participated in the Gujarat Kisan Parishad (Gujarat Farmer's Conference) held in Ahmedabad in 1928. She met the Governor of Bombay as a member of the deputation for a settlement of the Bardoli Satyagraha. In 1929, she presented in front of the Royal Commission on Labour regarding labour conditions in textile mills in Ahmedabad. She picketed in front of the liquor shops during the civil disobedience movement in 1930. (Note: During the disobedience movement, the protesters picketed liquor shops with the aim of opposing drinking habit as a social evil as well as decreasing the income of the British government earned as an excise duty on drinks.) In 1931, she established a khadi store and worked at her husband's ashram near Shertha, Ahmedabad. In 1934, she established a co-operative store called Apna Ghar Ni Dukan.

Mehta was associated with several educational and women's welfare institutes in Ahmedabad, Baroda, and Bombay during these years, as well as being a member of Baroda Praja Mandal (Baroda People's Association). She was a member of the Ahmedabad Municipality from 1931 to 1935. In 1934, she established the Jyoti Sangh for women's welfare.

She was a proponent of women's education. She established the Vanita Vishram Mahila Vidyalaya in Ahmedabad. She also established a college affiliated with SNDT (Karve) Women's University.

=== Literary career ===
Mehta had studied and was deeply influenced by Hindu texts, Sanskrit literature, and the works of Aurobindo, Sukhlal Sanghvi, and Sarvepalli Radhakrishnan.

She was an essayist, biographer, and translator. She wrote essays on social issues in dailies and magazines. Puranoni Balbodhak Vartao (1906) is a collection of children's stories aimed at their development. She wrote Florence Nightingale Nu Jeevancharitra (1906), a biography of English social reformer Florence Nightingale. She also wrote Grihavyavasthashastra (1920). Balakonu Gruhshikshan (1922) is a work on child education.

In 1938, she wrote her autobiography, about her public life and her efforts for women's education in Jeevansambharana (Reminiscences: The Memoirs of Shardaben Mehta). This work covers the period from 1882 to 1937 and includes the social, historical, and political situation and awakening of women.

With her sister, Mehta translated Romesh Chunder Dutt's Bengali novel Sansar (The Lake of Palms, 1902) as Sudhahasini (1907) and The Maharani of Baroda (Chimnabai II)'s Position of Women in Indian Life (1911) as Hindustanma Streeonu Samajik Sthan or Hindustanna Samajik Jeevanma Streenu Sthan (1915). She also translated Sathe Annabhau's novel as Varnane Kanthe.

== Death ==
She died on 13 November 1970 at Vallabh Vidyanagar.

== Bibliography ==
- Sharadaben, Mehta (2007). Reminiscences : The Memoirs of Sharadaben Mehta. Translated by Mehta Bhatt, Purnima. New Delhi, India: Zubaan Publications. ISBN 9788189013653. OCLC 269250818.

== See also ==
- List of Gujarati-language writers
