= Bholanath Divetia =

Gujarati Poet

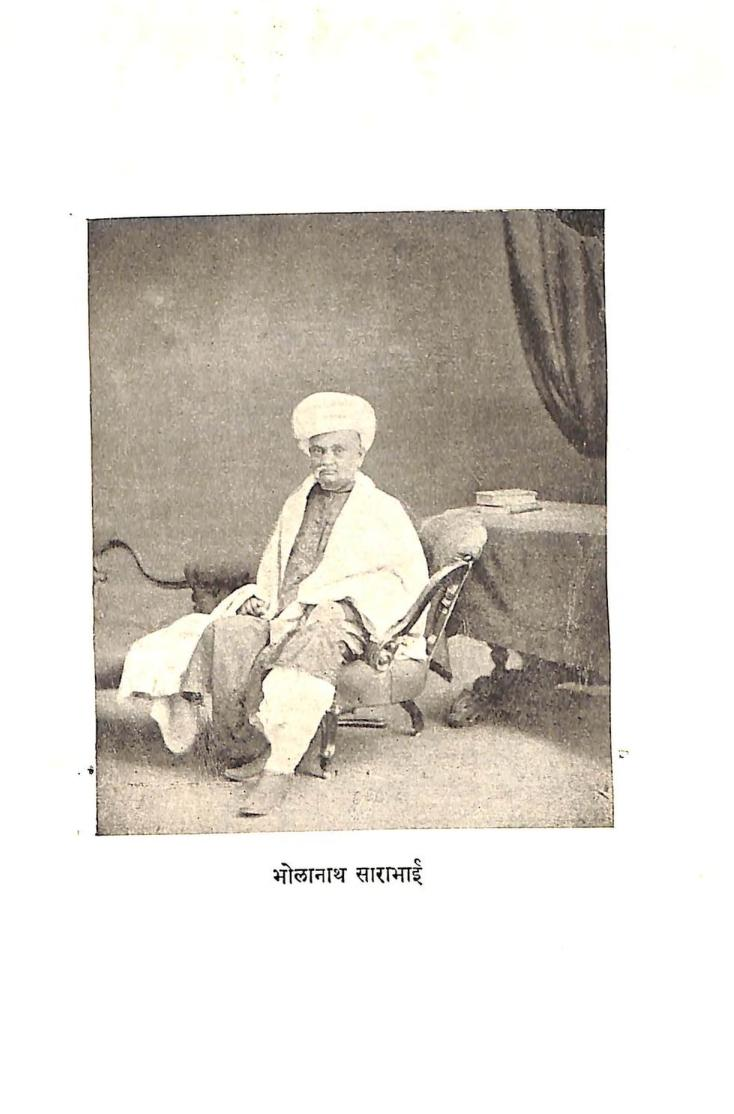
Bholanath Saraibhai in his later years of life

Bholanath Sarabhai Divetia (1822 – 11 May 1886) was Gujarati poet and religious reformer from India.

== Biography ==
Bholanath Sarabhai was born in a Nagar Brahmin family from Ahmedabad. He studied law and served as a government servant during British rule in India. He was elevated to the post of first class sub-judge. He retired in 1874 and was awarded the Rai Bahadur title by the British. He was born in an orthodox religious family and believed in idol worship but adopted belief in a formless god. He founded Prarthna Samaj and Dharma Sabha for religious reform. He was the father of Gujarati author Narsinhrao Divetia. His grand daughter Satyavati, was married to Lallubhai Shamaldas

He died on 11 May 1886.

== Works ==
He knew Gujarati, English, Marathi, Persian and Sanskrit languages. His two volumes of Ishwar Prarthanamala are the collection of prayers in thirty sections designed as prayers for thirty days of the month. Last two sections were completed by his son, Narsinhrao Divetia, as he died before completion. His Abhangamala is a poetry in abhanga and dindi forms of poetry from South India.

== Memorials ==
The 200 years old Haveli belonging to Bholanath has been declared heritage property by Ahmedabad Municipal Corporation, and the Haveli is a part of places covered in the Heritage walk of Ahmedabad. It is with carved wooden work and floral motifs painted in green and gold colours. Famous poets like Akho Bhagat used to frequent this Haveli before the lifetime of Bholanath.

== See also ==
- List of Gujarati-language writers
