= Ramanbhai Neelkanth =

Indian novelist, essayist and literary critic (1868-1928)

Rai Bahadur Sir Ramanbhai Nilkanth
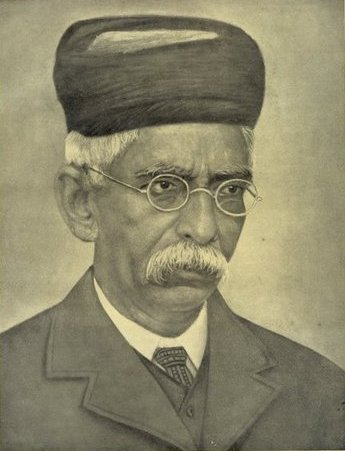
- Born: Ramanbhai Mahipatram Nilkanth; 13 March 1868; Ahmedabad, Gujarat
- Died: 6 March 1928 (aged 59); Ahmedabad
- Education: Gujarat College; Elphinstone College
- Occupations: Novelist; essayist; literary critic; politician
- Spouse: Vidyagauri Nilkanth (m. 1887)
- Children: Vinodini Nilkanth, Sarojini Mehta
- Relatives: Mahipatram Rupram Nilkanth (father)
- Writing career
- Language: Gujarati
- Period: Pandit Yuga
- Notable works: Bhadrambhadra (1900); Raino Parvat (1914)
- Notable awards: Knighthood (1927)

Ramanbhai Mahipatram Nilkanth (13 March 1868 – 6 March 1928) was a Gujarati novelist, essayist, literary critic from India. The Ramanlal Nilkanth Hasya Paritoshik is named after him.

== Life ==
Ramanbhai Nilkanth was born on 13 March 1868 in Ahmedabad to Mahipatram Rupram Nilkanth and Rupkunwarba who were social reformers. He completed his primary and secondary education in Ahmedabad. He matriculated in 1883. He joined Gujarat College, Ahmedabad in 1884 and completed his B.A. from Elphinstone College, Bombay in 1887 and later obtained his LL.B.

His first wife, Hansvadan, died at a young age and he married again to Vidyagauri Nilkanth, one of the first female graduates from state, in 1887. He worked as a clerk in the government office. He had later served as a Judge in Godhra.

He was awarded title of Rai Bahadur and later knighthood in 1927.

He served as the mayor of Ahmedabad. He was also the first secretary of the Ahmedabad Red Cross founded in 1923. He served as the president of Gujarati Sahitya Parishad in 1926.

He died on 6 March 1928 at Ahmedabad. His daughters, Vinodini Nilkanth and Sarojini Mehta, were also writers. British travel writer Pico Iyer is his great-grandson.

== Works ==
His humour novel Bhadrambhadra (1900) was a satire on language and social puritans. It is influenced by The Pickwick Papers and Don Quixote. His other novel is Shodhma (1915, incomplete). He wrote classic play Raino Parvat (1914). Hasyamandir (1915, with Vidyagauri) is collection of humour essays. His works of criticism are Vakyapruththakruti ane Nibandh Rachana (1903), Saraswatichandra nu Avlokan and Hridayveenanu Avlokan. Two volumes of Dharm Ane Samaj (1932, 1935) are his philosophical work discussing religion and society. Kavita Ane Sahitya is his four volumes on poetry and prose. The Volume 1 (1904) contains articles on prosody and rhetoric; Volume 2 (1904) contains articles on practical criticism; Volume 3 (1928) contains occasional lectures and essays and Volume 4 (1929) contains some poems, short stories and essays on humour. Gujaratno Sankshipta Itihas (Short History of Gujarat) and Vivahvidhi (1889) are his other works. He also edited Gyansudha. Through his criticism, he tried to formulate a theory of artistic and literary beauty, which was influenced by the theories of English critics of his time.
