= Jyotindra Dave =

Gujarati humorist writer

- Born: Jyotindra Hariharshankar Dave; 21 October 1901; Surat, Bombay Presidency, British India
- Died: 11 September 1980 (aged 78); Bombay, India
- Occupations: humourist, author
- Spouse: Karsukhben Dave (m. 1929)
- Writing career
- Language: Gujarati
- Notable work: Ame Badha (1935)
- Notable awards: Ranjitram Suvarna Chandrak (1941); Narmad Suvarna Chandrak (1940)

Jyotindra Hariharshankar Dave (1901-1980) was a Gujarati humourist writer from India. Born and educated at Surat, he is regarded as a great humourist writer in Gujarati literature.

== Life ==
He was born in Surat on 21 October 1901. He completed matriculation in 1919, BA in 1923 and MA in 1925 from Surat. He joined K. M. Munshi in Bombay to write history of Gujarati literature from 1926 to 1933. He taught at Kabibai highschool in Mumbai for brief period when Munshi was in jail. He also co-edited Gujarat monthly. From 1933 to 1937, he taught Gujarati language at MTB College, Surat. On Munshi's request, he returned to Bombay in 1937 and worked as a translator in Oriental office of Bombay Government until his retirement in 1956. He later taught Gujarati in various colleges of Bombay and later served as a principal in college at Mandvi, Kutch. He also served as a president of Gujarati Sahitya Parishad in 1966. In later years, he co-edited the fortnightly Samarpana.

He spent his later years in Bombay and died there on 11 September 1980. His house is located in Amliran area of Surat.

Jyotindra Dave's house in Surat

== Works ==
Dave used all forms of humor in his writing including satire, parody, wit, conceit. He is considered as one of the best humorists in Gujarati literature.

Dave's first humorous sketches were published in literary journals from 1927 to 1932 under the pseudonym of Gupta. It was well received by the readers and was published later as Mari Nondhapothi, followed by Rangatarang Vol. 1-6 (1932 - 1946), which contains humorous essays, short plays, verse prosodies and other miscellaneous writing. He is known for his humorous novel Ame Badha (1936), co-written with Dhansukhlal Mehta. It depicts the humorous account of the life of Surat, the native city of both authors. The plotline consists of events in the life of the protagonist Vipin from his birth to the marriage.

=== Selected works ===
- Hasya-tarang (1945)
- Pan na Beeda (1946)
- Alpatma nu Atmapuran (1947)
- Ret ni Rotli (1952)
- Jya Tya Padey Najar Mari (1965)

== Awards ==
He received Ranjitram Suvarna Chandrak in 1941. He also received Narmad Suvarna Chandrak in 1940.

== Personal life ==
Dave married Karsukhben in 1929, and they had a daughter Rama, and two sons, Pradip and Asit.

== See also ==
- List of Gujarati-language writers
