= Nanalal Dalpatram Kavi =

Indian writer and poet (1877-1946)

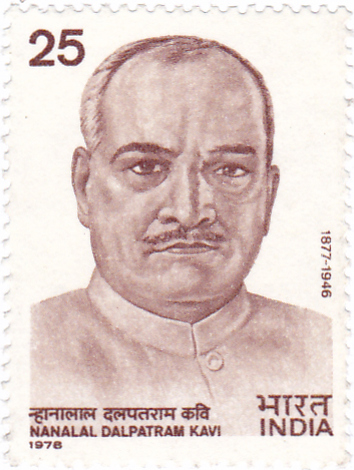
- Nanalal on a 1978 stamp of India
- Born: 16 March 1877; Ahmedabad, British Raj
- Died: 9 January 1946 (aged 68); Ahmedabad, India
- Occupations: Poet; novelist; playwright; biographer; translator
- Relatives: Dalpatram (father)
- Writing career
- Period: Pandit Yuga

Signature
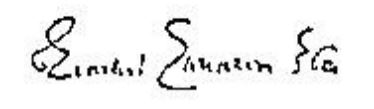

Nanalal Dalpatram Kavi (16 March 1877 – 9 January 1946) was an Indian writer and poet in Gujarati language of Gujarati literature. His name is sometimes spelled as Nhanalal.

== Biography ==
Nanalal was born on 16 March 1877 in Ahmedabad as the fourth son of Dalpatram, who settled there since 1848 after migrating from Wadhwan. Dalpatram was popular and admired as poet that his ancestral surname Tarvadi (Trivedi) was gradually dropped and he came to be generally known as Kavi (poet). Nanalal and his descendants then adopted permanently Kavi as their surname.

Nanalal passed his matriculation examination in 1893. He took his college education in various colleges at Bombay, Poona and Ahmedabad, and received his Master of Arts degree from the University of Bombay in 1901.

He died on 9 January 1946 in Ahmedabad.

== Works ==
While studying at the college, Nanalal started writing poetry. Vasantotsava (Festival of Spring), a poem, was his first literary composition.

Vasantotsava and Oaj ane Agar are his Khandakavyas (narrative lyrics). He unsuccessfully attempted to write an epic entitled Kurukshetra. His last work Harisanhita, an epic poem, was published posthumously in three parts during 1959–1960. Harisanhita, composed in Anuṣṭubh metre, is considered to be 'a sublime piece of poetry'. Umashankar Joshi called his lyrics 'Gujarat's paragon in melody in words'.

Among the plays that Nanalal has written, the main ones are Indukumar, Jaya ane Jayant, Shahenshah Akbarshah, Vishvageeta and Jahangir–Noorjahan. In his social plays, he has discussed the problems of marital love and love-marriage. His plays have thin plot and characters, and their stageability is also limited. These plays are written in Dolanshaili, a sort of blank verse based on rhythm, employed by the Nanalal himself.

Pankhadio is a collection of his short stories. He wrote two novels entitled Usha and Sarathi (Charioteer). Usha is a story of a poet turned lover. In Sarathi, he discusses contemporary politics and prophesises that India will one day be the charioteer (leader) of the world.

He wrote a biography of his father, Dalpatram, in three volumes entitled Kavishwar Dalpatram. The critic Mansukhlal Jhaveri considers it 'remarkable' for the valuable information it provides about the life in Gujarat some time before and during the life time of Dalpatram. Jhaveri also criticised it for its excessive exaggeration in presentation and the total lack of balance in judging the subject. Apana Saksharratno (part I & II) and Gurudakshina are the collections of biographical sketches.

He translated several works into Gujarati from Sanskrit including Kālidāsa's Abhijñānaśākuntalam and Meghadūta; Bhagavad Gita, Shikshapatri and 5 Upanishads.

== Reception ==
The Government of India issued a postage stamp on him in his honour on 16 March 1978.

Gujarati critic and historian Mansukhlal Jhaveri notes, in History of Gujarati Literature, that "few poets in Gujarat have reached as high a zenith in esteem as Nanalal, who during his own life time was acknowledged as the greatest lyrical poet of Gujarat.

== See also ==
- List of Gujarati-language writers
