= List of Gujarati-language writers =

The following is an alphabetical list of Gujarati writers who has contributed in Gujarati literature; presenting an overview of notable authors, journalists, novelists, playwrights, poets and screenwriters who have released literary works in the Gujarati language, used predominantly in Gujarat state as well as Mumbai city in Maharashtra state, India. There is a sizable Gujarati diaspora.

== List ==
=== A ===
- Ankit Trivedi
- A. N. Jani
- Aabid Surti
- Abdulgani Dahiwala
- Abhimanyu Acharya
- Achyut Yagnik
- Adil Mansuri
- Ajaysinh Chauhan
- Akho
- Akshay Ramanlal Desai
- Alexander Kinloch Forbes
- Ambalal Sakarlal Desai
- Ambulal Purani
- Amrit Keshav Nayak
- Amritlal Vegad
- Amrut Ghayal
- Amrutlal Yagnik
- Anandghan
- Anandshankar Dhruv
- Anantrai Raval
- Anil Chavda
- Anil Joshi
- Anila Dalal
- Aniruddh Brahmabhatt
- Anjali Khandwala
- Ankit Trivedi
- Ansuya Trivedi
- Anwar Agewan
- Anwarmiya Kaji
- Ardeshar Khabardar
- Asharam Dalichand Shah
- Ashok Chavda
- Ashok Dave
- Ashokpuri Goswami
- Ashwini Bhatt
- Asim Randeri

=== B ===
- Babu Suthar
- Babubhai P. Vaidya
- Bachubhai Ravat
- Bakul Tripathi
- Balashankar Kantharia
- Balmukund Dave
- Balwantray Thakore
- Bapulal Nayak
- Barkat Virani 'Befam'
- Behramji Malabari
- Bhagvat Singh
- Bhagwandas Patel
- Bhagwatikumar Sharma
- Bhalan
- Bhanuprasad Pandya
- Bhanuprasad Trivedi
- Bharati Shelat
- Bhavesh Bhatt
- Bhavin Gopani
- Bhavsinhji II
- Bhogilal Gandhi
- Bhogilal Sandesara
- Bhoja Bhagat
- Bholabhai Patel
- Bholanath Divetia
- Bhupat Vadodaria
- Bindu Bhatt
- Buddhisagarsuri

=== C ===
- C. N. Patel
- Chandrakant Bakshi
- Chandrakant Sheth
- Chandrakant Topiwala
- Chandrashekhar Vijay
- Chandravadan Mehta
- Chimanlal Trivedi
- Chinu Modi
- Chhotalal Rukhdev Sharma
- Chunilal Madia
- Chunilal Shah
- Curumsey Damjee

=== D ===
- Dadudan Gadhvi
- Daksha Pattani
- Daksha Vyas
- Dalpatram
- Dalsukh Dahyabhai Malvania
- Damodar Botadkar
- Dayaram
- Deepakba Desai
- Dhansukhlal Mehta
- Dhirendra Mehta
- Dhiru Parikh
- Dhiruben Patel
- Dhirubhai Thaker
- Dhumketu
- Dhwanil Parekh
- Digish Mehta
- Dileep Jhaveri
- Dinkar Joshi
- Dipak Bardolikar
- Dolarrai Mankad
- Durgaram Mehta
- Durgashankar Kevalram Shastri

=== E ===
- Esha Dadawala
- Esther David
- Eva Dave

=== F ===
- Father Vallés

=== G ===
- Gangabai Yagnik
- Gangasati
- Geeta Parikh
- Ghanshyam Desai
- Ghulam Mohammed Sheikh
- Gijubhai Badheka
- Girdhar
- Govardhanram Tripathi
- Gowriprasad Jhala
- Gulabdas Broker
- Gulfam
- Gunvant Shah
- Gunvantrai Acharya

=== H ===
- H. N. Golibar
- Hajimahamad Allarakha
- Hansa Jivraj Mehta
- Hardwar Goswami
- Hargovinddas Kantawala
- Harikrishna Pathak
- Harilal Dhruv
- Harilal Upadhyay
- Harindra Dave
- Hariprasad Shastri
- Hariprasad Vyas
- Harish Meenashru
- Harish Nagrecha
- Harishchandra Bhatt
- Harivallabh Bhayani
- Harji Lavji Damani 'Shayda'
- Harkisan Mehta
- Harshad Trivedi
- Hasmukh Baradi
- Hasu Yajnik
- Heera Pathak
- Hemant Chauhan
- Hemchandracharya
- Himanshi Shelat

=== I ===
- Ichharam Desai
- Ila Arab Mehta
- Indulal Yagnik
- Ishwar Petlikar

=== J ===
- J. V. S. Taylor
- Jagdish Joshi
- Jahangir Edalji Sanjana
- Jahangir Pestonji Khambhata
- Jaishankar Bhojak 'Sundari'
- Janak Dave
- Janak Trivedi
- Jashwant Thaker
- Jawahar Bakshi
- Jay Vasavada
- Jaya Mehta
- Jayant Gadit
- Jayant Khatri
- Jayant Kothari
- Jayant Meghani
- Jayant Pathak
- Jayanti Dalal
- Jaybhikhkhu
- Jayendra Shekhadiwala
- Jhaverchand Meghani
- Jinaharsha
- Jinvijay
- Jivram Joshi
- Joravarsinh Jadav
- Joseph Macwan
- Jugatram Dave
- Jyotindra Dave
- Jyotish Jani
- Jyotsna Milan

=== K ===
- Kaajal Oza Vaidya
- Kaka Kalelkar
- Kalapi
- Kamal Vora
- Kamlashankar Trivedi
- Kanhaiyalal Maneklal Munshi or K. M. Munshi
- Kanti Bhatt
- Kantilal L. Kalani
- Kantilal Vyas
- Karsandas Mulji
- Kavi Kant
- Keshavlal Dhruv
- Khalil Dhantejvi
- Kiransinh Chauhan
- Kirit Doodhat
- Kishansinh Chavda
- Kishore Jadav
- Kishorlal Mashruwala
- Kishorsinh Solanki
- Krishnalal Jhaveri
- Krishnalal Shridharani
- Kumarpal Desai
- Kundanika Kapadia
- Kundanlal Dholakia
- Kakalbhai Ravjibhai Kothari

=== L ===
- Labhshankar Thakar
- Lalji Kanpariya
- Lilavati Munshi

=== M ===
- Madhav Ramanuj
- Madhu Rye
- Madhusudan Dhanki
- Mafat Oza
- Mahadev Desai
- Mahatma Gandhi
- Mahendra Meghani
- Mahendrasinh Parmar
- Mahesh Champaklal
- Mahipatram Rupram
- Makanji Kuber Makwana
- Makarand Dave
- Makrand Mehta
- Malayanil
- Manhar Modi
- Manibhai Jashbhai
- Manilal Desai
- Manilal Dwivedi
- Manilal H. Patel
- Manisha Joshi
- Manjulal Majmudar
- Manoj Khanderia
- Mansukhlal Jhaveri
- Mansukhram Tripathi
- Manubhai Jodhani
- Manubhai Pancholi 'Darshak'
- Mareez
- Mavji Maheshwari
- Milind Gadhavi
- Mirabai
- Mohammad Mankad
- Mohan Parmar
- Mohanlal Chunilal Dhami
- Mukul Choksi
- Mukund Parikh
- Mulshankar Bhatt
- Mulshankar Mulani

=== N ===
- Nagindas Parekh
- Nagindas Sanghavi
- Nakar
- Nandshankar Mehta
- Narayan Hemchandra
- Narendra Modi
- Narhari Parikh
- Narmad
- Narmadashankar Mehta
- Narsinh Mehta
- Narsinhrao Divetia
- Navalram Pandya
- Navalram Trivedi
- Nayan Desai
- Nazir Dekhaiya
- Nazir Mansuri
- Neerav Patel
- Nhanalal
- Neeta Ramaiya
- Niranjan Bhagat

=== P ===
- Panna Naik
- Pannalal Patel
- Phoolchand Gupta
- Pinakin Dave
- Pingalshi Brahmanand Gadhvi
- Pitambar Patel
- Prabodh Pandit
- Prahlad Brahmbhatt
- Prahlad Parekh
- Prakash N. Shah
- Pramodkumar Patel
- Pranav Pandya
- Pravin Darji
- Pravin Pandya
- Premanand Bhatt
- Priti Sengupta
- Priyakant Maniar

=== R ===
- Raam Mori
- Radheshyam Sharma
- Raeesh Maniar
- Raghunath Brahmbhatt
- Raghuveer Chaudhari
- Rajendra Patel
- Rajendra Shah
- Rajendra Shukla
- Rajesh Vankar
- Rajesh Vyas
- Rajnikumar Pandya
- Rakesh Jhaveri
- Ramanbhai Nilkanth
- Ramanlal Desai
- Ramanlal Joshi
- Raman Soni
- Ramanlal Soni
- Rambha Gandhi
- Ramchandra Patel
- Ramesh Parekh
- Ramlal Chunilal Modi
- Ramprasad Bakshi
- Ramsinhji Rathod
- Ranchhodbhai Dave
- Ranchhodji Diwan
- Rang Avadhoot
- Ranjitram Mehta
- Rashid Meer
- Rasik Shah
- Rasiklal Parikh
- Ratan Marshal
- Ratilal 'Anil'
- Ratilal Borisagar
- Ratnamanirao Jote
- Ravji Patel
- Ravindra Parekh
- Rita Kothari
- Ruswa Majhalumi

=== S ===
- Sanjay Chaudhary
- Sanjay Chhel
- Sanju Vala
- Sanskritirani Desai
- Saroj Pathak
- Sarojini Mehta
- Saroop Dhruv
- Saumya Joshi
- Shahabuddin Rathod
- Shamal Bhatt
- Shankarlal Shastri
- Shankar Painter
- Shanta Gandhi
- Sharda Mehta
- Sharifa Vijaliwala
- Shayda
- Shivkumar Joshi
- Shridhar Vyas
- Shrikant Shah
- Shrimad Rajchandra
- Shyam Sadhu
- Sitanshu Yashaschandra
- Snehrashmi
- Sukhlal Sanghvi
- Suman Shah
- Sumant Mehta
- Sundaram
- Sundarji Betai
- Suresh Dalal
- Suresh Joshi
- Swami Anand
- Swami Sachchidanand
- Swapnastha

=== T ===
- Taarak Mehta
- Tarini Desai
- Theodore Hope

=== U ===
- Udayan Thakker
- Udayaratna
- Umashankar Joshi
- Urmi Desai
- Usha Upadhyay
- Ushnas
- Utpal Bhayani
- Uttamlal Trivedi

=== V ===
- Vadilal Dagli
- Vaju Kotak
- Vallabh Bhatt
- Vallabhsuri
- Varghese Paul
- Varsha Adalja
- Vasubahen
- Venibhai Purohit
- Vibhut Shah
- Vidyagauri Nilkanth
- Vihang A. Naik
- Vijay Shastri
- Vijaygupta Maurya
- Vijayray Vaidya
- Vinesh Antani
- Vinod Bhatt
- Vinod Joshi
- Vinod Meghani
- Vinodini Nilkanth
- Vipin Parikh
- Viru Purohit
- Vishnu Pandya
- Vishwanath Bhatt
- Vivek Kane 'Sahaj'
- Vrajlal Shastri

=== Y ===
- Yashwant Trivedi
- Yogendra Vyas
- Yogesh Joshi
- Yogesh Vaidya
- Yoseph Macwan

=== Z ===
- Zar Randeri
