= Jinaharsha =

Personal life
- Born: 17th century
- Died: 18th century

Religious life
- Religion: Jainism
- Sect: Śvētāmbara

Religious career
- Teacher: Shantiharsha

Jinaharsha was a Jain ascetic poet who lived in 17th and 18th century.

He was a disciple of Shantiharsha of Kharatara Gaccha. He spent last years of his life in Anhilwad Patan where his handwritten manuscripts are preserved in Jain libraries.

== Works ==
Jinaharsha had written more than thirty Rasas, an early genre of poetry. Some of them are Shukaraja Rasa (1681), Shripalrajano Rasa (1684), Ratnasinh Rajarshi Rasa (1685), Kumarpal Rasa (1686), Harishchandra Rasa (1688), Uttamkumar Charitra Rasa (1689), Abhaykumar Rasa (1702), Sheelvati Rasa (1702), Jambuswami Rasa (1704), Aaramshobha Rasa (1705), Vasudeva Rasa (1706). He also wrote more than four hundred devotional poems in the form of Stavana, Sajjhaya, Hundi, etc. His prose includes three Balavabodha. Majority of his works are unpublished.

== See also ==
- List of Gujarati-language writers
