= Sanghavi (surname) =

Sanghavi is a surname. Notable people with the surname include:

- Sanghavi (fl. 1993), Indian actress
- Harsh Sanghavi (born 1985), Indian politician
- Nagindas Sanghavi (1920–2020), Indian political professor
