= Vijay Shastri =

Indian Gujarati language writer (born 1945)

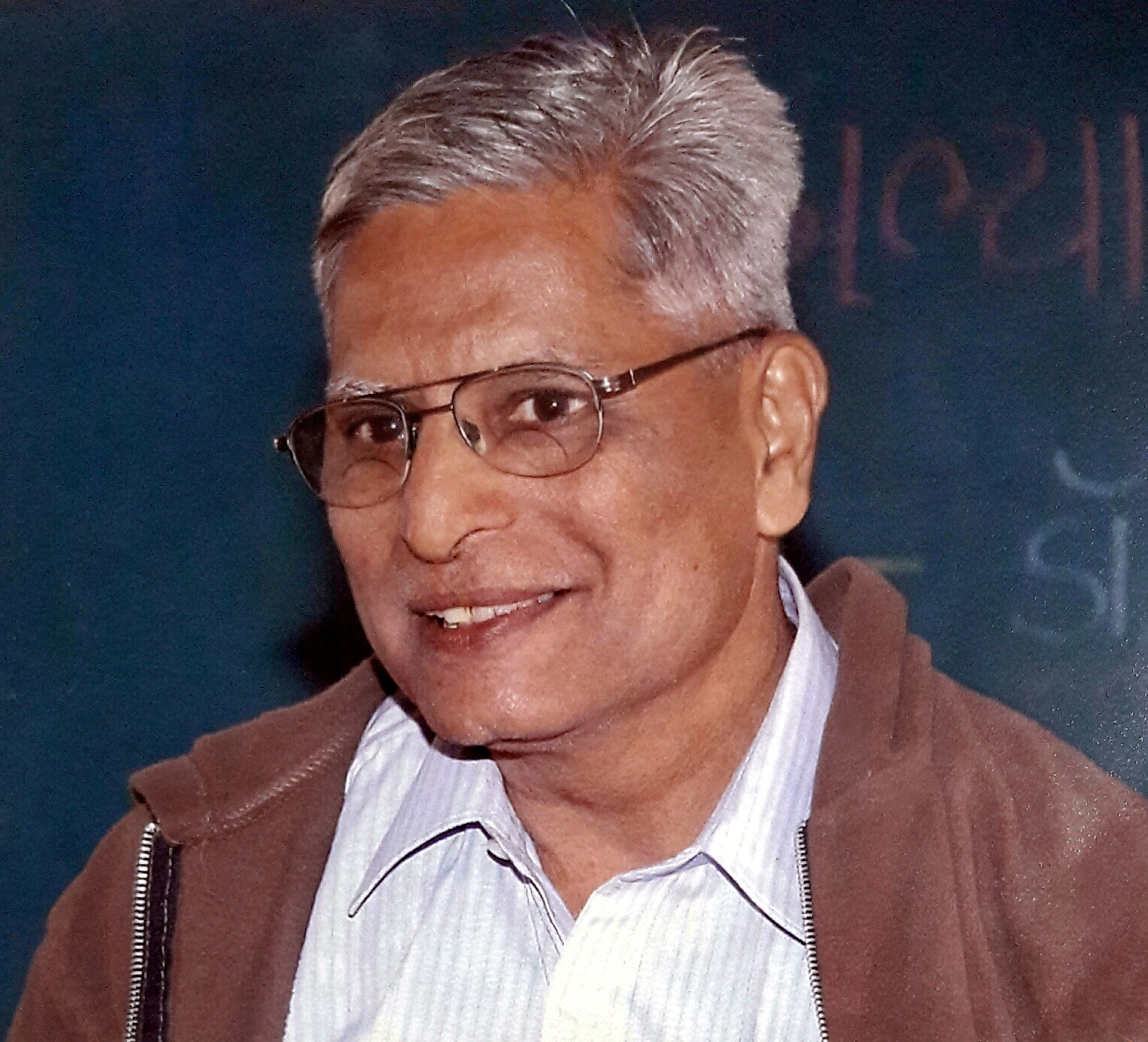
- Shastri in 2009 at Kim, Surat
- Born: 10 August 1945 (age 81); Santacruz, Bombay, British India
- Education: M. A., Ph. D.
- Alma mater: M. T. B. Arts College, Gujarat University
- Occupations: Short story writer, novelist, critic, translator
- Spouse: Dipti (m. 1975)
- Children: Niket, Vastav
- Writing career
- Language: Gujarati

Vijay Ramanlal Shastri (born 10 August 1945) is an Indian Gujarati language short story writer, novelist, critic and translator. He was educated and worked at the M. T. B. Arts College in Surat and has written more than two hundred short stories in addition to several works of criticism.

== Life ==
Vijay Shastri was born on 10 August 1945 in Santacruz, Bombay (now Mumbai, India) to Ramagauri and Ramanlal Shastri. He completed his primary education from Primary School No. 2 and secondary school education from Jeevanbharati school in Surat. In 1961, he joined the M. T. B. Arts College in Surat. After studying Gujarati and Sanskrit at the Gujarat University, he graduated with a B. A. in 1965 and an M. A. in 1967. Fourteen years later, in 1981 and from the same university, he completed his Ph. D. under Jayant Pathak with his thesis Char Vartakaro (Jayant Khatri, Sundaram, Umashankar, Jayanti Dalal): Ek Abhyas (Four Story Writers (Jayant Khatri, Sundaram, Umashankar, Jayanti Dalal): A Study). His first work was published in Ruchi magazine.

He taught at a college in Daman and later at Wadia Women's College, Surat. He later joined the M. T. B. Arts College in 1968 where he taught until his retirement in 2007. He also served as the Head of the Department of Gujarati there from 1989 to 2007. He had briefly worked in the editing department of Gujarat Mitra daily during his M. A. (1965–67).

Shastri married Dipti in Surat in 1975 and they have two sons, Niket and Vastav.

== Works ==
Shastri is an experimental story writer, especially in his techniques. His short story collections are: Mrs. Shah ni Ek Bapor (1971), Anhi To (1973), Hovu Etle Hovu (1978), Ettarettar (1979), Ityadi (1988), Asare Khalu Sansare (1993), Shravan ni Kavad (2001), Avagaman (2008) and Sarnamu Badalayu Chhe (2015) totaling more than 200 short stories written in the Gujarati language. In his stories, human emotions are described with deep intensity. His selected stories were published as Vijay Shastrini Shreshth Vartao (1986) edited by himself and Vartavishesh (2007) edited by Nutan Jani.

Hu Ane Hu (1970) and Ek Hato Manas (1970) are his novels, and have not been as successful as his short stories. America: Alap Jhalap (2007) is his travelogue of his experiences and responses to his travel in United States. Leela Aparampar (2000), Ajab Bhayoji Khel (2000), Khali Khali Avo (2001), Chhas Bhi Kabhi Dahi Thi! (2003) and Paghdi: Bandh Besati (2007) are his collections of humorous essays. They also include elements of satire.

Mahakavi Dante: Jeevan Ane Kavan (1970) is his critical work on Dante Alighieri and his works Divine Comedy and The New Life. His other works of criticism are: Sahityano Aswad Ane Chhand Alankar Charcha (co-authored), Atratatra (1982), Tunkivarta (1984), Saundaryanishthawad (1989), Kathapratyaksh (1990), Kavyaras (1993), Char Vartakaro: Ek Abhyas (1995, thesis), Tatpurush (1997), Bavanno Saghalo Vistar (2000), Trepanmo Janye Par (2002), Samanjasya (2004), Samvay (2006), Sahityik Vachnao Vishe (2011), Kritigat (2014), Tulanasandarbh (2016), Tatsam (2018).

Sanskar Khatar (1971), Vishwani Pratinidhi Vartao (1974), Paraya Mulakma (co-translated with his wife, 1993), Tran Videshi Laghunavalo (Three Foreign Short Novels, 1996; novels by Miguel de Unamuno, John Steinbeck and Guy de Maupassant), Mokshagudam Vishweshwarayya (2013) and Bernard Shaw's play Candida are his translations. Tathakathit (1987) is his work of philosophy. Prabhu, Aam J Aapda Tu Harato is his memoir.

In 1976, he published Udgar which included his study of European as well as Indian thinkers and authors such as Albert Camus, George Bernard Shaw, Anton Chekhov, Kalidasa and Sarvepalli Radhakrishnan. He edited Gujaratna Bhashasahitya Par Adhunikikaranno Prabhav (1987), Sahityana Siddhanto (co-authored, 1989) and Vishayantar (2011).

His short story "Na Dharme Labdhakamano Musaddo" was adapted on television as Mansukhkakano Musaddo.

== Awards ==
Shastri was awarded the prizes by the Gujarat Sahitya Akademi for his thesis (1995), Khali Khali Avo (2001) and Trepanmo Janye Par (2002).

== See also ==
- List of Gujarati-language writers
