= Rasik =

Rasik is an Indian name. Notable people with the name include:

- Rasik Dave (1957–2022), Indian actor
- Rasik Shah (1922–2016), Indian Gujrati-language writer
- Rasik Mohan Chakma (born 1964), Indian politician and member of Mizoram Legislative Assembly
- Rasik Krishna Mallick (1810–1858), Indian journalist and reformer
