= Jaya Mehta =

Gujarati poet, critic and translator

- Born: 16 August 1932; Koliyak village, British India (now Bhavnagar district, Gujarat, India)
- Died: 26 August 2025 (aged 93)
- Education: M.A., Ph. D.
- Alma mater: SNDT Women's University
- Occupations: Poet; critic; translator
- Writing career
- Language: Gujarati

Academic background
- Thesis: Humour in Gujarati Poetry and Drama upto 19th-century with Special Reference to Akho, Premanand, Shamal, Dalpatram and Navalram (1973)
- Doctoral advisor: Ansuya Trivedi

Jaya Vallabhdas Mehta (16 August 1932 – 26 August 2025) was a Gujarati poet, critic and translator from Gujarat, India. She was educated and later worked at SNDT Women's University.

== Life ==
Jaya Mehta was born on 16 August 1932 at Koliyak village near Bhavnagar (now in Bhavnagar district, Gujarat, India) to Lalitaben and Vallabhdas. She completed P. T. C. and started working as a school teacher. She continued her studies and completed her B.A. in 1954 and her M.A. in 1963 from SNDT Women's University, Mumbai. She later received her Ph.D.. She served as a professor of Gujarati at SNDT Women's University and retired from there. She was a co-editor of Sudha (weekly of Saurashtra Trust) and Vivechan (trimonthly of Department of Gujarati, SNDT Women's University). She wrote columns in Pravasi, Mumbai Samachar and Samkalin dailies.

== Works ==
Jaya Mehta wrote rationalist poetry in free verse. Her poetry is logical and socially aware instead of enclosed in emotional world. Her poetry collections are Venetian Blind (1978), Ek Divas (1982), Akashma Tarao Choop Chhe (1985), Hospital Poems (1987). Renu and Ek Aa Khare Pandadu (1989) are her novels. Venetian Blind and Akashma Tarao Chhup Chhe reflect her "concern for the human predicament". Manogat (1980), Kavyajhankhi (1985), Ane Anusandhan (1986), Bookshelf (1991) are her works of criticism. She has edited Kavi Priy Kavita (1976), Varta Vishwa (co-edited, 1980), Suresh Dalalna Shreshth Kavyo (1985), Apna Shresth Nibandho (1991), Raghupati Raghav Rajaram (2007). Her research works include Gujarati Kavita Ane Natakma Hasyavinod, Gujaratna Prashsti Kavyo (1965), Gujarati Lekhikaoe Navalkatha-Varta Sahityama Alekhelu Streenu Chitra. Vimanthi Wheelchair is her travelogue.

She had translated several works. Mara Mitro (1969), Arati Prabhu (1978), Mannu Karan (1978), Churchbell (1980), Chani (1981), Ravindranath: Tran Vyakhyano, Saundaryamimansa (co-translated), Champo Ane Himpushpa, Samudrayalni Prachand Garjana, Revenue Stamp (Autobiography of Amrita Pritam, 1983), Dastavej (1985), Suvarna Mudra Ane... (1991). Radha, Kunti, Draupadi (2001), Vyasmudra are her translations. She also translated Ernest Hemingway's The Old Man and the Sea into Gujarati.

She translated S L Bhyrappa's novel Daatu into Gujarati in 1992.

== Awards ==
She received the Sahitya Akademi Translation Prize for her translations.

== See also ==
- List of Gujarati-language writers
