= Janak Trivedi =

Indian Gujarati-language writer (1944-2007)

- Born: 10 June 1944; Kothi, Rajkot district, Gujarat, India
- Died: 29 January 2007 (aged 62); Guwahati, Assam, India
- Occupations: Short story writer, novelist, essayist
- Writing career
- Language: Gujarati
- Period: Post-modern Gujarati literature

Janak Trivedi (10 June 1944 – 29 January 2007) was an Indian Gujarati-language short story writer, essayist and novelist from Gujarat, India.

== Life ==
Trivedi was born on 10 June 1944 in Kothi, a village near Jasdan, Rajkot district, Gujarat, India. He was a station manager in Indian Railways at Bhavnagar division. He was also a painter.

He died on 29 January 2007 at Guwahati following heart attack.

== Works ==
He published his short story collection Baval Vavnar Ane Biji Vartao in 1995. Nathi is a novel written by him. Maro Asabaab (2008) is his collections of Essays. His short stories are characterised by non-urban Gujarat's life style as well as its culture, language and dialects.

He received several prizes from Gujarati Sahitya Parishad and Gujarat Sahitya Academy for his books. He is also a recipient of Sandhan Award And Mudra Chandrak.

== See also ==
- List of Gujarati-language writers
