= Deepakba Desai =

Gujarati poet

Deepakba Desai (1882-1955) was a Gujarati poet from India.

== Works ==
She collected Bhajans, devotional praises, marriage songs and biographies in Stavanmanjari (1923). She published poems on ideals from history and Puranas in Khandkavyo (1926) which shows combination of traditional and experimental new poetry. Her other works include Rasbatrisi.

== See also ==
- List of Gujarati-language writers
