= Ashok Dave =

Indian humorist and columnist

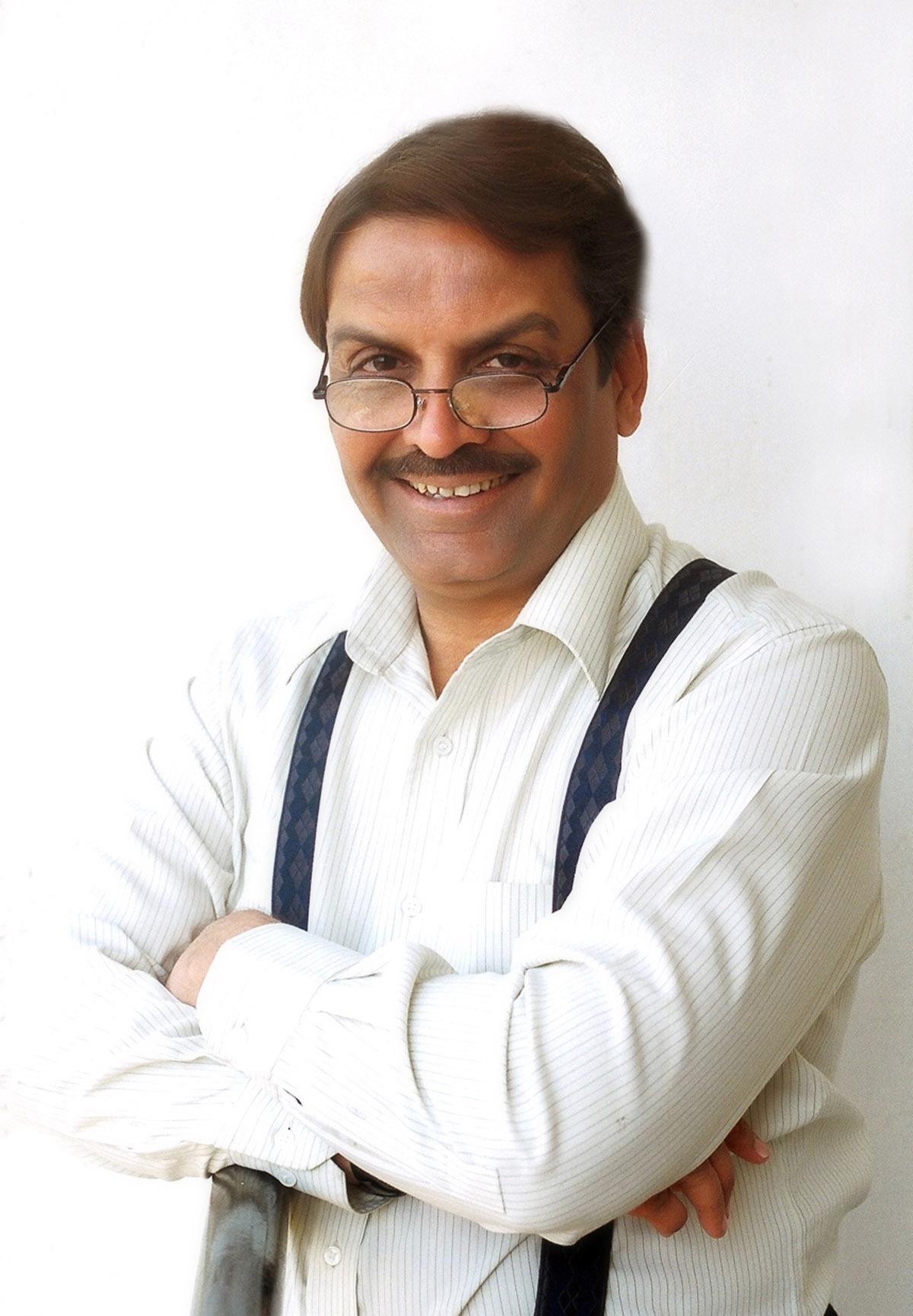
Ashok Dave at his residence in Ahmedabad, 2005

Ashok Dave is a Gujarati language humorist and columnist from India. Apart from his weekly humor columns, he writes columns on old Hindi films and music.

== Life ==
He was born on 29 February 1952 in Jamnagar, Gujarat, India. He started writing in 1969 and a year later, he wrote Kaji Duble Kyu? in Sandesh on a weekly basis.

== Works ==
His humor books include Ashok Dave ni Sixero, Ashok na Sheelalekho, Baporiyu Encounter, Black Label, Coffee House, Eveningyu Encounter, Jenti Jokham, Mera Mumbai Mahan, Morningyu Encounter, Pet Chhuti Vaat, Rangbirangi, Sui Kiyo Chho?, Ashokna Updesho, Budhvarni Bapore.

Film Sangeet na e Madhura Varsho, Hero-Heroine and Muhammad Rafi are his books on Hindi film music and industry.

Ashok Dave wrote "Budhvarni Bapore" every Wednesday in Gujarati daily Gujarat Samachar. His question/answer column "Encounter" was published every Sunday. "Koi Door Gaye" was his column on old Hindi film music published every Friday.

== See also ==
- List of Gujarati-language writers
