= Mohanlal Chunilal Dhami =

Indian Gujarati-Language Poet (1905-1981)

- Born: Mohanlal Chunilal Dhami; 13 June 1905 Patan, Baroda State, British India
- Died: 2 April 1981 (aged 75) Rajkot, Gujarat, India
- Occupation: Novelist, poet, playwright, journalist, Ayurveda practitioner

Mohanlal Chunilal Dhami (13 June 1905 – 2 April 1981) was a Gujarati novelist, poet, playwright, journalist and Ayurveda practitioner from Rajkot, Gujarat, India. He had published more than 170 books. His literary works are chiefly based on Jain literature.

== Biography ==
Dhami was born in 1905 at Patan, Baroda State, British India (now in Patan district, Gujarat, India). He studied till 6th standard at Hunterman Training College at Chotila, Gujarat. In his childhood, he wanted to renounce and become a Jain monk but when he could not become a monk, he renounced Doodhpak, a sweet dish. In 1928, he received a degree of Ayurved Bhushan from Ujamashi Pitambardas Ayurvedic College, Patan. He also learnt several languages including Bengali, Hindi, Sanskrit, Prakrit, Urdu, and Marathi. Later he completed education of Ayurved Shastri.

In 1929, he started an Ayurveda clinic in Chotila, and in 1937 at Rajkot. He was influenced by Mahatma Gandhi and wore Khadi clothes all his life. He participated in the Indian independence movement and visited many villages to create awareness of it. He was imprisoned by the British authorities for participating in the Satyagraha at Visapur. On suggestion of Vallabhbhai Patel, he created a mobile exhibition which toured the villages of Maharashtra. He was also influenced by Rabindranath Tagore and Surendramohan Mukhopadhyay.

At the age of eighteen, he wrote his first book, Atma Vinod. He wrote editorials for Gujarati newspaper Jaihind for many years. He used to write serialised novels for five publications simultaneously.

He died on 2 April 1981 in Rajkot.

== Works ==
Dhami was a prolific writer and has written travelogues, essays, biographies, novels, short stories as well as contributed to children's literature, religious literature, and the field of history. He had published more than 170 books. He has written about 200 songs and some traditional Charani songs. He has also written a story, dialogues and songs of three Gujarati films; Vargheli, Ena Charane and Bhaneli Vahu. He has written under pseudonyms Mridul and Bazigar. He had published a magazine Kokil. His literary works are chiefly based on Jain literature.

His selected works include:

Novels

Dhami has written detective as well as social novels but he is primarily known for his historical novels based on Jain literature. His novel Rupkosha was included in a curriculum of a university, and has been translated in Hindi and English.

- Krantini Zalari (1940)
- Madhurajani (1942)
- Rupkosha (1946)
- Magadheshwari (1952)
- Bandhan Tutyan (1954)
- Milan Madhuri
- Siddh Vaital
- Unchogadh Girnar
- Natraj - Payalbaje
- Vishvas

Folk literature

- Dayaro
- Raskatori

Plays

- Ranakdevi
- Jasma Odan
- Hothal Padamani
- Bhakta Pundarik

Translations

- Nirupama
- Paru
- Mukta Pankhi

Others

- Dadimanu Vaidu

== Personal life ==
He married Kanta. He had produced some folk music records. His son Vimal Mohanlal Dhami is also a writer. He used to play Ravanahatha. He was honoured by the Sadhana Sanman Samiti on behalf of Jain community of Mumbai.

== See also ==
- List of Gujarati-language writers
