= Gangabai Yagnik =

Gujarati writer and teacher (1868–1937)

Gangabai Pranshankar Yagnik
- Born: 1868
- Died: 1937 (aged 68–69)
- Occupations: Writer, teacher, Ayurveda-practitioner
- Notable work: Hunnar Mahasagar (1898)

Gangabai Pranshankar Yagnik (1868–1937) was a Gujarati writer from 19th century India. A teacher and an Ayurveda-practitioner by profession, she wrote Hunnar Mahasagar (1898) which was a compilation of about 2080 trades, skills and tips for self-employment. She is considered as the first female Gujarati writer. (Note: The claim is controversial due to nature of her work which is not considered literary by scholars. Instead, Nandkunwar Ba is considered as the first female writer for her travelogue Bhumandal No Pravas published in 1898.)

== Life ==
Gangabai Yagnik was born in 1868. She was native of Vavol (near Gandhinagar, Gujarat, India). Her husband died in 1881 when she was thirteen. She had refused to tonsure her head according to the custom of her time. She was sent to school by her sister where she completed her studies. She joined a primary school as an assistant teacher. She decided to study further and joined Mahalakshmi Female Training College, Ahmedabad. She left Vavol in 1887 and moved to Mansa where she was appointed a headmistress of Victoria Girl School. She was an entrepreneur who advocated swadeshi (local produce) and self-employment. She was an ayurveda-practitioner and treated gynecological problems as well. She established Garbhajivan Aushadhalaya, a hospital in Mansa, around 1879 and later started its branch at Ahmedabad.

She died in 1937. She had willed to give scholarships to students from the proceeds of her hospital after her death.

== Works ==
Yagnik's writing is considered rebellious and reformist. She opposed superstitions and social evils like witch-hunting, blind faith, child marriages and polygamy in Vahem Khandan Pothi (1891) and Devi Triya Nishedh (1892).

Her Hunnar Mahasagar (1898) is a compilation of about 2080 trades, skills and household tips for self-employment. It includes the information on methods of preparation of traditional medicines; such as for bites, eyes and ears; on metallurgy as well as on indigenous cottage industries such as soaps, paper, papad, perfumes, hair oil, artificial pearls, herbal colours, detergent, incense sticks, tooth powder, gunpowder and varnish. It became so popular that it sold thousand copies in just three days of its publication and had seventh edition by 1908.

== Legacy ==
Gangabai Yagnik is considered as the first female Gujarati writer. The claim is controversial because her writing is not considered literary by some scholars such as Raghuveer Chaudhari. SRISTI, a foundation based in Ahmedabad, collected information on her and republished new editions of Hunnar Mahasagar in 2003. It also campaigned for her recognition in the history of Gujarati literature. Historian Shirin Mehta noted that she advocated swadeshi (local produce) much before Mahatma Gandhi popularised it.

== See also ==
- List of Gujarati-language writers
