= Navalram Trivedi =

- Born: Navalram Jagannatha Trivedi; 11 October 1895; Wadhwan
- Died: 18 May 1944 (aged 48); Ahmedabad
- Education: MA
- Occupations: Literary critic, editor, professor
- Writing career
- Pen name: Vaiyntey, Daberi, Ponipachis
- Language: Gujarati

Navalram Jagnnath Trivedi (1895–1944) was a Gujarati writer, critic and editor. He served as a secretary of Gujarat Sahitya Sabha for twenty years.

== Life ==
Trivedi was born 11 October 1895 in Wadhwan in Audichya Sahastra Brahmin family. He completed schooling at Wadhwan Camp and passed his matriculation in 1914. After earning his Bachelor of Arts degree in 1920, he started his career as a professor at Lalshankar Umiyashankar Gujarati Mahila Pathashala. In 1926, he completed his Master of Arts. He served as a secretary of Gujarat Sahitya Sabha for twenty years.

He died on 18 May 1944 at Ahmedabad.

== Works ==
He wrote humorous writing under three pen-names: Vainetey, Ponipachis and Daberi. He started his literary career by translating Bengali writer Arvind Ghosh's book into Gujarati as Karavasni Kahani (1921).

His works of criticism include Ketlak Vivechano (1934), Nava Vivechano (1941), Shesh Vivechano (1947; posthumous) and Samajsudhara Nu Rekhadarshan. Critics noted his criticism for its comparative approach.

He edited Jayanti Vyakhyana (1921, 2nd ed.), which is a collection of papers read at the anniversary meeting of fifteen Gujarati writers, by their friends and admirers. He wrote monograph on poet Kalapi under the title Kalapi (1944).

== See also ==
- List of Gujarati-language writers
