= Usha Upadhyay =

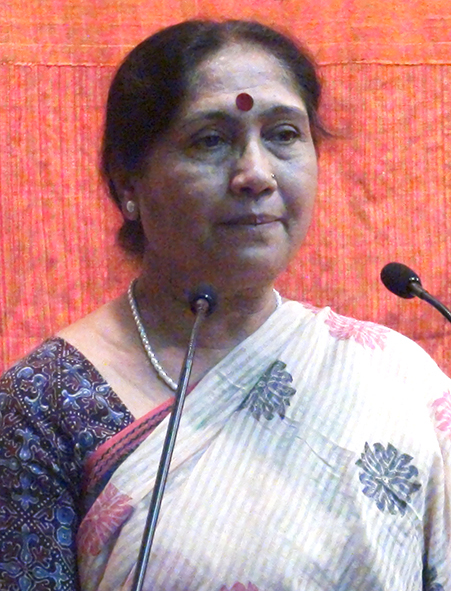
- Usha Upadhyay at Gujarat Vishwakosh Trust, January 2015
- Born: Usha Ghanshyam Upadhyay; 7 June 1956 (age 70); Bhavnagar, Gujarat, India
- Education: MA, PhD
- Occupations: Writer, poet and professor
- Writing career
- Language: Gujarati

Usha Ghanshyam Upadhyay (born 7 June 1956) is an Indian Gujarati-language writer from Gujarat, India.

== Life ==
Usha Upadhyay was born on 7 June 1956 in Bhavnagar. She completed M. A. in Gujarati and later received Ph. D. She works as the Head of the Department of Gujarati in Gujarat Vidyapith, Ahmedabad. She is the vice president of the Gujarati Writers' Association.

== Works ==
She has written plays, essays, poetry and stories. Jal Billori (1998), Arundhatino Taro (2006) and Shyam Pankhi Aav Aav (2013) are her poetry collections. Mastikhor Maniyo (2004) is her collection of one-act plays. She has written a children's story, Ek Hati Roopa (1999).

Ikshit (1990), Sahitya Sannidhi (1998), Alokparva (2005), Samprat Gujarati Sahitya (2008), Aksharne ajvale (2009), Gujarati Sanshodhan-Sampadan (2009) are works of criticism. She has edited Adhit 15-19 (1992-1996), Jhanavi Smriti - 2,3 (1996, 1997), Gujarati Chayan (1999, 2000), Sarjan Prakriya Ane Narichetna (2006), Gujarati Lekhikaoni Pratinidhi Vartao (2006), Gujarati Lekhikaona Pratinidhi Nimbandho (2006), Gujarati Lekhikaona Pratinidhi atmakathya (2006), Matrubhashanu Mahimagyan (2010), Urmikavi Nhanalal (research, 2012), Kabirna Amarsutro. Vadali Sarovar (1999) and Kavivar Rajendra Shah Aur Unaki Kavita (2003, Hindi) are her translation. Her miscellaneous works are Gujarati Sahityano Gyan Samvad - Nimbandho (2006, 2012), Shunyatama Purela Dariyano Tarkhat (2007) and Radhakrishna Vina Biju Bol Ma (2007).

Her poems are translated in Odia, Bengali, Kannada, Hindi, Sanskrit and English.

== Awards ==
She has been awarded Batubhai Umarwadiya Prize by Gujarati Sahitya Parishad, Bhagini Nivedita Prize and Sauhard Samman Puraskar by Uttar Pradesh Hindi Sansthan, Lucknow.

== See also ==
- List of Gujarati-language writers
