= Janak Dave =

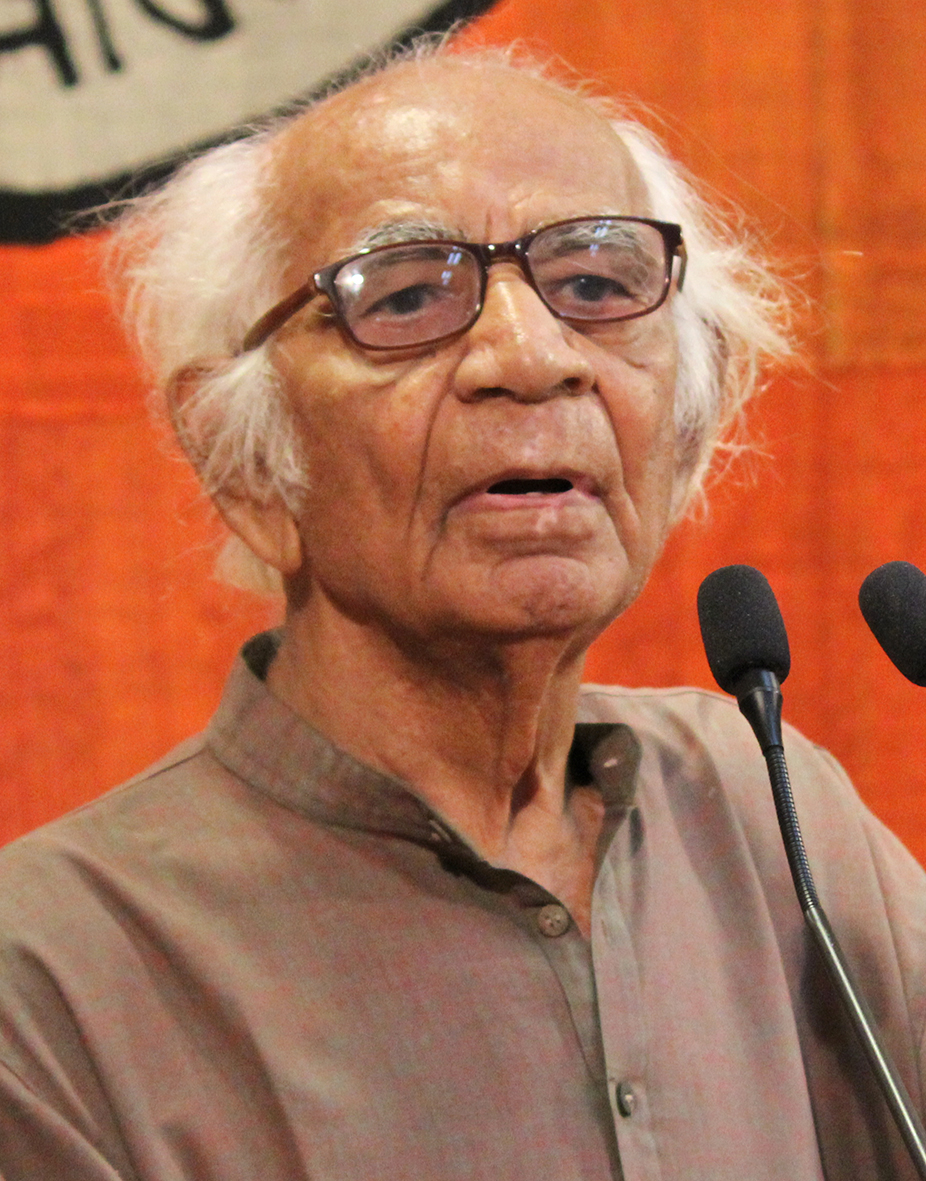
- Dave at Gujarat Vishwakosh Trust, 11 May 2019
- Born: Janak Harilal Dave; 14 June 1930 (age 96); Bhavnagar, British India
- Occupations: Dramatist, theater actor and drama teacher
- Writing career
- Language: Gujarati

Janak Harilal Dave (born 14 June 1930) is a Gujarati dramatist, theater actor and drama teacher from Gujarat, India.

== Life ==
Dave was born on 14 June 1930 at Bhavnagar in British India, to his father Harilal, and mother, Chaturabahen. He passed his matriculation in 1955, and worked at a preschool for seven or eight years. In 1957, he joined the music college affiliated with M. S. University, Vadodara, where he studied dramaturgy under Chandravadan Mehta and Jasvant Thaker, earning his bachelor's degree and masters with first class honours.

From 1963 to 1967, he worked as a chair person of drama department at Sangit Natya Bharati, Rajkot. From 1967 to 1971, he served as lecturer at drama department of Panjab University. In 1971, he joined Gujarat College, taught drama, and retired from there in 1988 as a head of department.

== Works ==
Dave is known as a drama teacher, theater actor and playwright. He is a scholar of Bhavai form (a folk theater form popular mostly in western India). He wrote plays, books on drama-teaching, and translated several books into Gujarati.

He wrote Aakhri Kasabno Ughad (1997) and Abhinay Prashikshan (2002), which are based on the system of Konstantin Stanislavski. His Hetulakshi Ekankio (2001) contains some original plays while some are translated plays. His Bhavai-Vesha (literally different narratives composed in the form of Bhavai) are published as Lokranjan Bhavai (1988), Dehno Dushman and Veshavansh (1998). They are mostly reform-oriented in nature.

Dave has also played a significant role in the development of children theater in Gujarati, and has published several books in the field: Rangalo Chalyo Farva (1989), Natak Khele Bal Gopala (1997) and Balnatya Digdarshan Kala (1997). He was popularly known as 'Janak Dada' among children.

He received the Gaurav Puraskar from the Government of Gujarat in 1993 for his contribution in drama teaching.

== See also ==
- List of Gujarati-language writers
