= Shankar Painter =

Gujarati-language poet and writer (1946–2020)

Shankar Painter (born Shankarbhai Savabhai Parmar; 17 November 1946 – 8 December 2020) was a Gujarati-language poet and writer from Gujarat, India.

== Biography ==
Shankar Painter was born on 17 November 1946 in Brahmanwada village of Patan district. He was a native of Varshila, a village in Siddhpur. He studied up to 11 standard, and worked as an executive engineer in O.N.G.C. Mahesana Project.

He died on 8 December 2020 in Ahmedabad, Gujarat. He is survived by his wife, three sons and a daughter.

== Works ==
Painter's first poetry collection, Bungiyo Vaage, was published in 1982. It was followed by Datedana Devata (1989) and Hacche Hacchu Bolan Fadya (2010; Tell Me The Truth Rascal). Shri Juhnuma Ni Jukti (2010) is a collection of religious folklore, and Shankar Suman (in two parts) is a collection of reflective bhajans (religious poetry). He published his short story collection, Ujaliyaat, in 2014. He wrote his autobiography under the title Maanyalo Bhitar Jale (2015).

Painter is known for his poetry based on caste-based oppression, which is written in typical Mehsani dialect, a language spoken in North Gujarat. He modeled his poems on the folk songs of Mehsani dialect; which was his "signature style" according to writer Raju Solanki.

== Reception ==
Writer Raju Solanki has called Painter's contribution to Gujarati Dalit poetry as a "significant landmark".

The Government of Gujarat awarded him the Saint Kabir Award In 2010. He received the Deshavira Vaghela Best Poem Prize (2013) from Dalitchetna magazine for his poem Ae Loko (Those People).

== See also ==
- List of Gujarati-language writers
