= Anwar Agewan =

Indian biographer, folklorist and editor

Anwar Mohammadbhai Agewan
- Born: 4 December 1936; Akola, Maharashtra, British Raj
- Died: 6 July 1991 (aged 54)
- Occupations: Biographer; folklorist; editor

Anwar Mohammadbhai Agewan (4 December 1936 – 6 July 1991) was an Indian Gujarati-language biographer, folklorist and editor. Born in Akola and educated in Gujarat and Bombay, he edited several publications. He wrote on religious thought and various saints of Gujarat.

== Biography ==
Agewan was born on 4 December 1936 in Akola (now in Maharashtra, India). He completed his primary and secondary education in Shivrajgadh and Gondal respectively. He passed matriculation from Bombay. He obtained a graduation from Agra Hindi Vidyapith. He worked with Jay Gujarat and Rooplekha weeklies in Bombay. He also edited Aastha magazine.

He died on 6 July 1991.

== Works ==
He wrote works on religious thoughts such as Vedsahityano Parichay (1965), story collection Advaita (1974), Sadhna ane Sakshatkar (1989), Chinmaya Gayatri (1989).

Rahiman Ane Jamal (1952), Girdhar Kaviray (1952), Sai Deendarvesh (1953), Sant Deendayalgiri (1954), Dasi Jeevan (1956), Kavi Gang (1954), Sant Dadu (1987, on Dadu Dayal) are works on saints of Gujarat while Rannade (1966), Rajasthanni Rasdhar (1974) and Kasumbino Rang (1988) are compilations of folk literature of western India.

== See also ==
- List of Gujarati-language writers
