= Vallabh Bhatt =

Medieval Gujarati poet

Vallabh Bhatt was a medieval Gujarati poet. Born in Ahmedabad, he later moved to Bahucharaji in devotion to the goddess Bahuchar Mata. He wrote several Garba and other devotional songs.

== Life ==
Not much is known about his life but his works and folklore are a source of information regarding his life. Vallabh was born in Bhatt Mevada, Brahmin caste. He was born in Navapura Para of Ahmedabad on Aaso Sud 8 of Vikram Samvat in 1696 or 1700 AD. He moved from Ahmedabad to Chunval (now Bahucharaji). The brothers went under the Yagnopavit ritual at the age of five and were taught by Paramanand Swarup Brahmachari for a brief period. He was a Vaishnav in his early life but became a follower of Shakti later. He had three brothers; Heri, Dhola and the name of third is not known. Hari and Dhola Bhatt were also poets. He wrote his first Garbo, Anandno Garbo on Falgun Sud 3 of Samvat 1709 as described in the Garba, at the age of 13.

"સંવત દસ શત્ સાત નેવું ફાલ્ગુન સુદેમા...

તિથિ તૃતિયા વિખ્યાત શુભ વાસર બુધે મા.."
Translation:

"O Mother, on the third day of Falgun month, on Wednesday, the Samvat year 1709, I dedicate.."

— Vallabh Bhatt, dates in Anandno Garbo

He wrote several Garba dedicated to Bahuchar Mata which are still popular across Gujarat. His name along with his brothers are perpetuated in cry of devotees in temple, Vallabh-Dhola Ki Jai or Vallabh-Hari Ki Jai.

He died on Aaso Sud 8 of Samvat 1807.

=== Legend ===
In Narmagadya, there is a legend associated with Vallabh Bhatt. It is said that he once visited Nathdwara to worship Shrinathji. He accidentally spit in temple premises and was scolded by people. He responded that parents don't scold children for spitting in their laps. The priests said that a mother may not scold children but fathers may scold. Thus vallabh changed his devotion from the male figure Shrinathji to the female figure Shakti or Bahuchar Mata thereafter.

== Works ==
Vallabh wrote the first Laavni, a poetry in specific taala, dedicated goddess. He wrote several Garba, Dhal, Pada, aarti songs mostly dedicated to goddess Bahuchar while others are dedicated to religious and epic figures.

Some of them are Anandno Garbo, Krishnavirahna Pada, Chosaath Joganiono Garbo, Bahucharajina Pada, Ramchandrajina Pada, Aarasurno Garbo, Shangarno Garbo, Mahakalino Garbo, Kalikaalno Garbo, Satyabhamano Garbo, Aankhmichamanino Garbo, Kamlakanthna Baar Mahina, Vrajviyog, Kajodano Garbo, Dhanushdharinu Varnan, Ambajina Mahina, Bahucharajini Aarti, Bahucharajini Gagar, Bahucharajino Rang Padasangrah, Rang Aarti, Chhutak Pada, Shrichakrano Garbo, Ambajino Garbo, Ramvivah and Abhimanyuno Chakravo. In Kalikaalno Garbo, he portrayed misery and immorality during the famine of Samvat 1788.

== Bibliography ==
- Vallabha (1962). Śrībahucarīnā paramabhakta Vallabha Bhaṭṭanī vāṇī. Ahmedabad: Sastuṃ Sāhitya Vardhaka Kāryālaya.

== See also ==
- List of Gujarati-language writers
