= Mavji Maheshwari =

Indian Gujarati-Language short story writer and novelist (Born: 1964)

Mavji Maheshwari is a Gujarati short story writer and novelist, chiefly known for his fiction based on the life in Kutch region. He was born on 30 December 1964 in Bhojay, a village in Mandvi of Kutch district, Gujarat, India.

== Works ==
He published his first short story collection Adrashya Diwalo in 2000, which is followed by Ratt-Kachchhi Vartao (2008), Vijog (2009), Pavan (2009), Hastrekha (2012), Surprise (2016) and Khovai Gayeli Gaam (2016). Melo, his first novel, was published in 2007, followed by Meghadambar (2008), Kaandhno Hak (2009), Aganbaan (2013) and Ajani Disha (2015). Ranbheri (2008) and Bor (2009) are two of his collections of plays.

He received several prizes from Gujarati Sahitya Parishad and Gujarat Sahitya Academy for his books. He is also a recipient of Kabir Award, Kakasaheb Kalelkar Prize, Jayant Khatri Award and Kala Gurjari Prize.

== See also ==
- List of Gujarati-language writers
