= Girdhar =

- Born: 1787; Gujarat
- Died: 1852 (aged 64–65)

Girdhar or Giradhara or Giridharadāsa (1787–1852) was a Gujarati poet.

== Works ==
Girdhar best known for his poetic epic Rāmāyaṇa (1835) which is popular in Gujarat. He derived the story primarily from the Rāmāyaṇa of Vālmīki and the Hanumannāṭaka, with some inspiration from other Puranic texts. His version is lucid and musical as it is in simple language and uses traditional metres and melodies including Dhanāśrī, Vilāvala, Māru, Sāmerī, Sāraga, Soraṭha, Āsāvarī, Bhairava, Dohā, Caupāī, Ghanākṣarī, and others. His poetry Radha Virahna Barmas is influenced by the poetry of Vaishnavism. His Tulasī-Vivāha narrates the wedding of Krishna and Tulsi in 26 lyrics. It resemble the Kadva (cantos) style of medieval Gujarati poetry. He also wrote lyrics on Gopi and Krishna relations and wrote Ashwamedha and Rājasūyayajña. He based a large number of his poems on the Daśamaskandha of the Bhāgavata Purāṇa.

== Biography ==
Girdhar or Giridharadāsa was born in the village of Māsar, Baroda State in a Lāḍ Vaṇik family in 1785. His father, Garabaḍadās, worked as a patwari or village accountant and for some years Girdhar followed him in the profession and was educated in the requisite fields. At the age of twenty he moved to Baroda where he worked for his sister's husband's banking firm. In Baroda he was exposed to learned ascetics and holy men, and studied Sanskrit language and its epic texts. Some years later he was initiated into the Vallabha Sampradāya by Gosvāmī Puruṣottamadās. Girdhar worked as a manager in the local Vallabhite temple. He was also a friend of an ācārya of the Rādhāvallabhī sect named Raṁgīlāl Mahārāj. Girdhar's wife and son both died early in life. Girdhar traveled to several Vaishnav religious sites with Raṁgīlāl. On the return journey, when Girdhar wished to visit Śrīnāthajī Raṁgīlāl refused. Girdhar was anxious to get Śrīnāthajī's darśana, and soon died while meditating upon him in 1850.

== See also ==
- List of Gujarati-language writers
