= Malayanil =

Gujarati writer from India

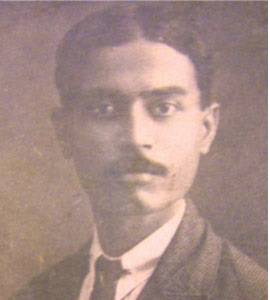
- Malayanil
- Born: Kanchanlal Vasudev Mehta; 1892; Ahmedabad, British India
- Died: 24 June 1919 (aged 26–27); Ahmedabad
- Education: BA, LLB
- Alma mater: University of Bombay
- Occupations: Story writer, poet
- Spouse: Bhanumati (after 1912)
- Writing career
- Language: Gujarati

Kanchanlal Vasudev Mehta (1892 – 24 June 1919), better known by his pen name Malayanil, was a Gujarati short story writer from British India known for his humorous pieces. He was a pioneer of modern short story writing in Gujarati.

== Biography ==
Mehta was born in 1892 in Ahmedabad to a Sathodara Nagar family. His father had a high-ranking position in a cotton mill. He completed his primary and secondary school education in Ahmedabad. He matriculated in 1908 and completed his BA in Science from the University of Bombay in 1912. He could not sit in on an MA in Literature examination in Bombay (now Mumbai) due to his poor health. He was interested in Sanskrit and English literature since childhood. After graduation, he worked in a matchstick factory in Ahmedabad. He passed the first year examination of LLB in 1913 and the second year examination in 1916.

He was active in his Sathodara Nagar community's reform committee. He wanted to join Gujarat Sahitya Sabha, the Gokhale Society, and the Home-rule League so he left Ahmedabad and moved to Bombay. In 1916, he took a job as a lawyer in solicitor Bhaishankar Kanga's firm.

He was interested in reading, music and painting. He married Bhanumati, then aged 12, in 1912. They lived in Bombay for a short time but returned to Ahmedabad due to his ill health.

He died on 24 June 1919 in Ahmedabad from appendicitis.

== Works ==
While studying for his BA in Science from 1909 to 1912, he published poems and comedic stories in various magazines such as Sundarisubodh, Vartavaridhi and Bhakt under the pen name Golmatol Sharma. When he became influenced by English literature, he started writing modern short stories under the pen name Malayanil in 1913.

Malayanil was a pioneer of modern Gujarati short story writing. He came in contact with Haji Mohammed Allarakha Shivji who encouraged him to write a short story; "Govalani" was published in Shivji's magazine Visami Sadi in 1918. It is generally considered the first modern short story in Gujarati. (Note: Malayanil's contemporary Dhansukhlal Mehta and Ranjitram Mehta also wrote short stories but Malayanil's "Govalani" is considered as the "perfect specimen" of modern short story. So there is a general consensus that he pioneered the modern short story writing in Gujarati.) Critic Manoj Daru has praised the story for its humour, characterisations, theme, and plot. It is free from the contemporary style of didactic stories. His other well known short story is "Rajnu Gaj".

His short story collection Govalani Ane Biji Vato was published posthumously in 1935 by his wife Bhanumati. It includes 22 short stories written between 1913 and 1918. He also wrote about 250 poems including some humorous ones. "Puna Viramno Pashchatap" (1914) is his one-act play.

== See also ==
- List of Gujarati-language writers
