= Udayaratna =

Personal life
- Born: 17th century
- Died: 18th century

Religious life
- Religion: Jainism
- Sect: Śvetāmbara

Religious career
- Teacher: Shivaratna

Udayaratna was a Jain monk and one of the leading Gujarati poets of 17th-18th century. He was a disciple of Shivaratna of Tapa Gaccha of the Śvetāmbara sect of Jainism.

== Works ==
He had written large number of Rasas. Jambuswami Rasa (1693), Sthubhadra Rasa (1703), Navkara Rasa (1706), Malaysundara Rasa (1710), Yashodahara Rasa (1711), Lilavati Sumativilasa Rasa (1711), Bhuvanbhanu Kevalino Rasa (1713), Harivansha Rasa (1743) are some of them. He had also written large number of short poetry in the forms of Stavana, Sajjhaya and Sholaka. His Stavana of Shankheshwar Parshwanath and his Sajjhaya on four Kashayas (anger, pride, deceit and greed) are still sung by Jains.
