= Dipak Bardolikar =

Gujarati poet, writer, and journalist (1925–2019)

- Born: Musaji Isapji Hafesji; 23 November 1925; Bardoli, British India (now in Gujarat, India)
- Died: 12 December 2019 (aged 94); London, UK
- Education: Matriculation
- Occupations: Poet, writer, journalist
- Spouse: Fatima (m. 1961)
- Children: 4 sons, 1 daughter
- Writing career
- Pen name: Dipak Bardolikar
- Language: Gujarati
- Notable awards: Fakir Suvarna Chandrak (1990)

Signature
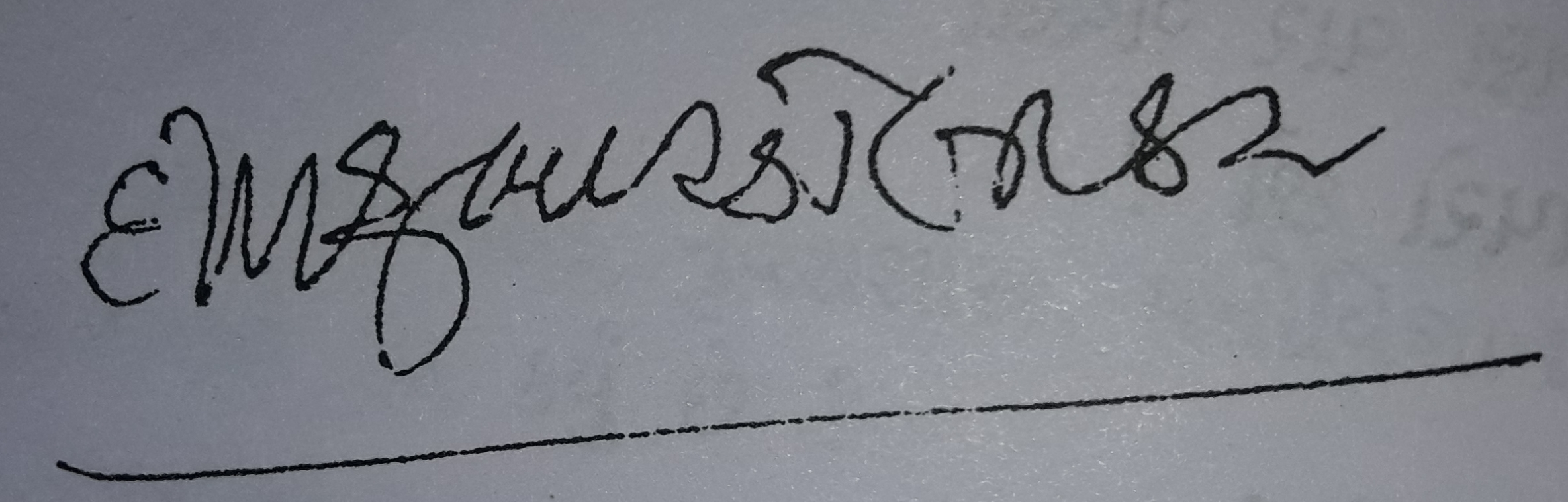

Musaji Isapji Hafesji (23 November 1925 – 12 December 2019), popularly known by his pen name Dipak Bardolikar, was a Gujarati poet, writer and journalist. Born and educated in Bardoli, he was involved in the Indian independence movement. Following the partition of India in 1947, he moved to Karachi, Pakistan. After returning to India in the 1960s, he was deported by the Government of India to Pakistan. After working for a brief period in East Pakistan, he moved to Karachi where worked with several Gujarati-language dailies published from Karachi including the Gujarati edition of Dawn. He is widely recognised for his contribution to the diasporic Gujarati literature. He published several works of poetry and historical research along with two-volume autobiography.

== Biography ==
Dipak Bardolikar was born on 23 November 1925 at Bardoli (now in Surat district of Gujarat, India) to Isapji (Yusuf). He was youngest among six siblings. His father died when he was six. He studied first two grades in Urdu, then three grades in Gujarati followed by English-medium school. After completing his primary education, he joined and matriculated from Bardoli Brahman Sarvajanik High School in Bardoli. He was interested in painting and boxing. He founded a gym with his friends. Later he joined the Indian National Congress and later Congress Sewa Dal in 1945 and participated in the Indian independence movement. After his opposition to leadership of Congress in Bardoli, he joined the All-India Muslim League. Following the assassination of Mahatma Gandhi, he was arrested with other leaders of the All-India Muslim League-affiliated Muslim National Guards in Surat district and jailed for a month in Surat. He married Khadija from Wankaner in his early life.

After his release from jail and the partition of India, he moved to Karachi, Pakistan with his elder brother Ibrahim for their tobacco business. He worked as a school teacher from 1949 to 1953. He returned to India when the health of his wife Khadija deteriorated following death of their daughter. The Government of India declared him a foreigner and brought a case against him for overstay in 1955 but he won the case in court a year later. In 1958, his son Nazir Ahmad died and he separated from his wife. He also had two sons from this marriage who are in the UK. Later he was given the deportation order to leave India in 1961. He was not allowed to enter Pakistan because he was recognised as an Indian. He was later allowed to live in Pakistan after facing some difficulties. He moved to East Pakistan (now Bangladesh) and worked as an accountant in a firm M. E. Dadabhai and Sons for one and half years. He later married Fatima in 1961; they had two sons, Jamil Ahmad and Nadim Ahmad, and a daughter, Nusratbanu.

He returned to Karachi and joined Dawn Group of Newspapers as a translator in advertisement department. He also managed its page on religious matters published on every Friday. He also worked with Watan in which he managed a page on films and later he was appointed to editorial department. He had also worked with Millat. In 1966–1967, he joined as a sub-editor of Gujarati edition of Pakistan's major daily Dawn. He later served as its Editor-in-Charge. In 1968, his mother died but he could not visit India due to political situation prevailing in Pakistan. In 1980, he was elected the President of Pakistan Herald Workers' Union, a union of press workers. In 1980s, during martial law in Pakistan, he was imprisoned for three months. He worked for a survival of Gujarati language in Pakistan and served as the President of Gujarati Kavi Sangat, a group of Gujarati poets.

After death of his wife in 1990 and retirement, he moved to Manchester, UK with his son in 2000. He died on 12 December 2019 in London, UK following cancer.

== Works ==
Bardolikar primarily contributed to ghazal poetry. His poetry collections are Parivesh, Mosam, Amantran, Vishwas, Talab, Eni Sherima, Gulmahorna Ghunt, Champo Ane Chameli, Hawana Pagala, Kulliyate Dipak, Tadko Taro Pyar, Relo Ashadno. His novels are Dhuliyu Akash and Bakhtavar. His works of history and research include Sunni Vahora, Vahora Vibhutio, Quran Parichay, Nyayno Divas, Vatna Diva. Meghdhanushya was his collection of essays.

He published his autobiography in two volumes. Uchhala Khay Chhe Pani (2004) records from his birth to 1978 while Sankalono Sitam (1999) includes his experiences in jail in 1978 followed by his life events till 1990. Gazalni Duniyama is his memoir.

He edited Videshi Gazalo, a collection of Gujarati ghazals from Pakistani poets.

== Recognition ==
Rangkala Gujarati Cultural Society of Karachi awarded him the Fakir Suvarna Chandrak in 1990 for his contribution to Gujarati Ghazals.

== See also ==
- List of Gujarati-language writers
