= Jahangir Edalji Sanjana =

Gujarati literary critic and professor (1880-1964)

- Born: 14 May 1880; Akola, Maharashtra, British India
- Died: 17 January 1964 (aged 83)
- Education: B.A
- Alma mater: Elphinstone College
- Occupation: literary critic
- Writing career
- Pen name: Anarya, Payakar, Tirohit
- Language: Gujarati, English
- Notable work: Studies in Gujarati Literature (1950)

Jahangir Edalji Sanjana (14 May 1880 – 17 January 1964), also known by his short name J. E. Sanjana, was a Gujarati literary critic and professor from Gujarat, India.

== Life ==
Jahangir Edalji Sanjana was born on 14 May 1880 in Akola, Maharashtra. He took his primary and secondary education in Marathi language, and graduated in Sanskrit language from Elphinstone College, and appointed there a fellow. He was appointed an assistant in the Mumbai government's Oriental Translator department, and then promoted to its head.

He died on 17 January 1964.

== Works ==
Sanjana has several pen-names which include Anarya, Payakar, and Tirohit.

He was dissatisfied with Gujarati prose and considered it poor in quality; and at the same time he had respect towards Gujarati as well as towards Sanskrit languages. He was well-versed in several languages including Marathi, Persian, Urdu, English and Sanskrit.

He wrote a detailed review of the book Klant Kavi, a collection of Balashankar Kantharia's poems edited by Umashankar Joshi, in which Sanjana strongly criticised the editor.

== See also ==
- List of Gujarati-language writers
