= Vipin Parikh =

Vipin Chhotalal Parikh (26 October 1930 – 18 October 2010) was a Gujarati poet from Gujarat, India.

== Early life and education ==
Vipin Parikh was born on 26 October 1930 in Bombay (now Mumbai). His belonged to Chikhli family (now in Valsad district, Gujarat). He studied B. Com. from University of Bombay and joined his father in plumbing business, later he retired. He had studied biochemistry and astrology by himself.

He died in Mumbai on 18 October 2010.

== Works ==
Vipin Parikh started writing poetry at later age. He chiefly wrote non-metrical poetry and his poetry is socially concerned and expresses modern sensitivity. He published three poetry collections: Ashanka (1975), Talash (1980) and Coffee House (1998). Mari, Tamari, Aapani Vaat (2003) is an anthology of all his poems. Alinganne Kat Lage Chhe (1999) and Hu Pachho Avish Tyare (2011) are his essay collections. He wrote short biographies on various saints in Shanti Pamade Ene Sant Kahie (1999). Suresh Dalal compiled a book on him under Kavi Ane Kavita series.

== See also ==
- List of Gujarati-language writers
