= Prahlad Brahmbhatt =

Indian novelist and journalist (1908–1997)

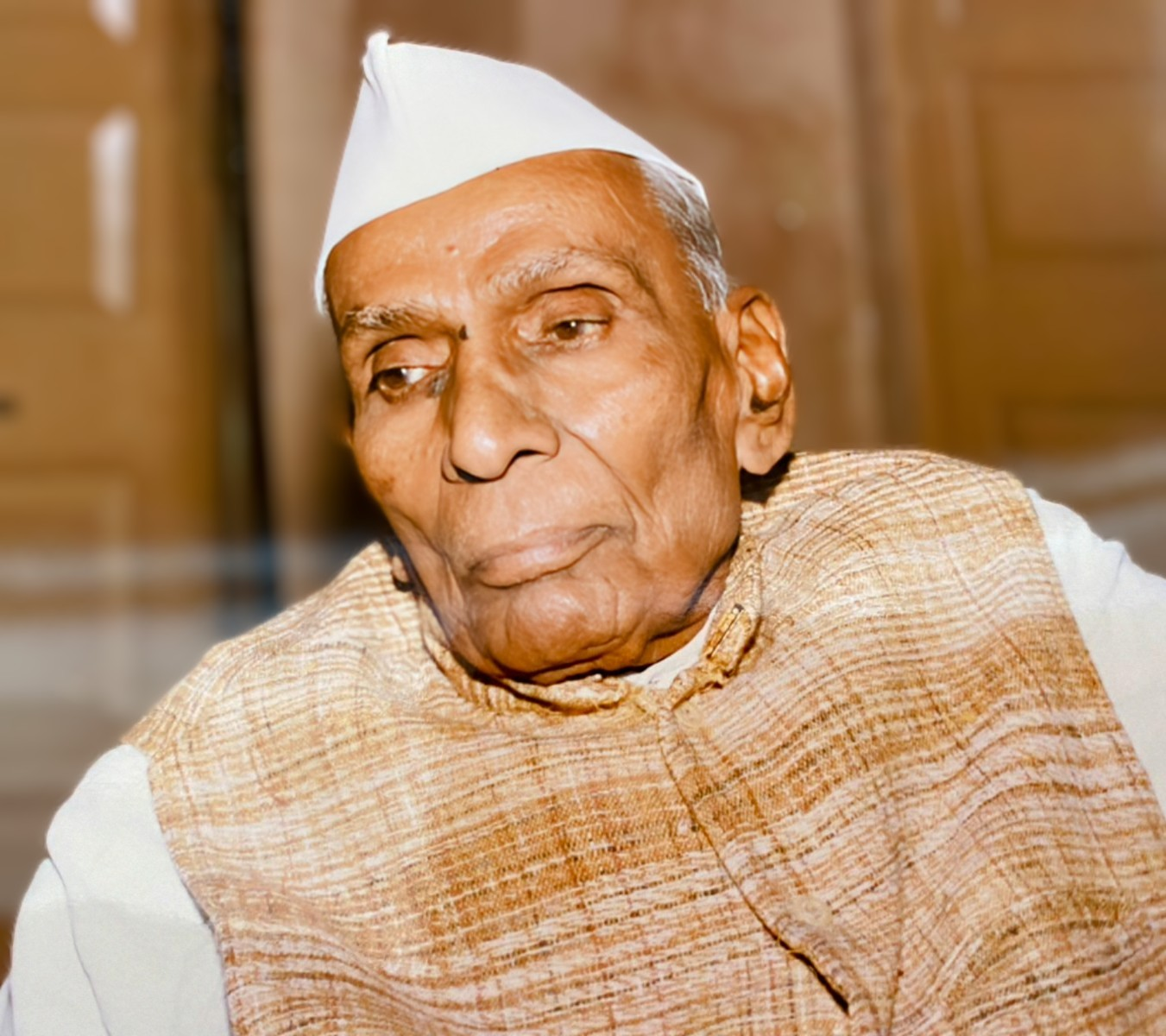
- Born: 22 August 1908; Ahmedabad, Gujarat, British India
- Died: 15 December 1997 (aged 89); Ahmedabad
- Occupations: Novelist; short story writer; biographer; journalist
- Writing career
- Language: Gujarati

Prahlad Damodardas Brahmbhatt (22 August 1908 – 15 December 1997) was an Indian Gujarati-language novelist, short story writer, biographer and journalist from Gujarat, India, known for his social novels. He authored more than 90 novels, some of which were adapted into films.

== Biography ==
Prahlad Brahmbhatt was born on 22 August 1908 in Ahmedabad, Gujarat, British India. He started his career as a journalist with Sandesh newspaper, and then joined Sevak as an editor and Jansatta as co-editor. He died on 15 December 1997 in Ahmedabad.

== Works ==
Brahmbhatt wrote more than 90 novels. Some of his novels were adapted into films. His notable novels are Adhuri Preet, Trusha ane Trupti (1961), Mati na Manvi (1962), Ek Panth : Be Pravasi (1963), Mobhe Bandhya Ver (1970), Zer na Parkha (1976), Reti nu Ghar (1979), Tutela Kach no Tukdo (1985), Man na Bandh Kamal (1988). His novel Trusha ane Trupti is noted for its autobiographical style and characterization.

His short stories are collected in Uma (1938), Adhura Fera (1946) and Jindagi na Rukh (1964). He wrote several biographies, notable among which are Lahorno Shahid Bhagatsinh (on Bhagat Singh), Netaji (on Subhas Chandra Bose) and Netaji na Sathidaro (on associates of Bose).

== See also ==
- List of Gujarati-language writers
