= Swapnastha =

Indian poet and story writer (1913–1970)

- Born: Bhanubhai/Laxminarayan Ranchhodbhai Vyas; 13 November 1913; Rajkot, Rajkot State, British India
- Died: 23 October 1970 (aged 56)
- Occupations: Poet, story writer

Swapnastha (13 November 1913 – 23 October 1970) was a Gujarati poet and story writer. His works were influenced by communism.

== Biography ==
Bhanubhai/Laxminarayan Ranchhodbhai Vyas was born on 13 November 1913 in Rajkot (now in Gujarat). He matriculated and worked with Zandu Pharmaceutical Works Limited from 1936 to 1944. In 1948, he moved to Bombay (now Mumbai) and worked with Asopalav, Nootan Gujarat and Hindustan publications. Later he worked as a translator with the Publicity Department of USLR. He died on 23 October 1970.

== Works ==
Swapnastha was a pseudonym of Vyas. He was an experimental and progressive poet who was influenced by communism and Karl Marx. He also came under the influence of Rabindranath Tagore. Love is the main theme of his poetry.

He had written some epic poems. His poems were imaginative and original. Achala (1937) is an epic tragic poem in Shikharini metre. Another of his epic poems is Vinashna Ansho, Maya (1938). His other epic poem Dharati (1946) has a story of human civilization in total of 1038 stanzas in Prithvi metre.

His Ajampani Madhuri (1941) has more than hundred sonnets, songs and metrical poems. His Ravanhaththo (1942) has poems influenced by bhajans and folksongs and depicts social inequality and exploitation. Lal Surya (1968) has influences of communism. Chirvirah (1973) was published posthumously.

Dinrat (1946) and Dhunina Pan (1950) are his collections of short stories depicting poverty, exploitation and inequality. Shodh (1937) is a novella written under pseudonym Mohan Shukla. J'hanavi (1953) is a novel depicting a love story of a two communists in backdrop of 1942 Quit India Movement.

Yugpurush Gandhi (1943), Poonamna Poyana (1953) and Palatato Jamano (1957) are his works of translation. He coedited two works on Marxism; Sahitya Ane Sanskar (1944) and Sahitya Ane Pragati I-II (1940, 1945). Marxvad Mool Ane Saratatva also has Marxist philosophy.

== Recognition ==
Swapnastha was awarded the Soviet Land Nehru Award for 1966.

== See also ==
- List of Gujarati-language writers
