= Bharati Shelat =

Indian archaeologist (1939–2018)

Bharati Kirtikumar Shelat (30 July 1939 – 2018) was an Indian archaeologist from Gujarat. She spent most of her career at B. J. Institute of Learning and Research, Ahmedabad, Gujarat.

== Life ==
Bharati Shelat was born on 30 July 1939 in Mehsana. She completed her SSC in 1956 from R.B.M.K. Girls High School, Ahmedabad. She received a BA in 1960 from Gujarat College, Ahmedabad with Sanskrit major and Psychology minor, and received a MA in 1962 from B. J. Institute, Ahmedabad with Sanskrit (Epigraphy) major and Ardhamagadhi minor. She obtained PhD in 1969 from B. J. Institute for her doctoral dissertation, The Chronological Systems of Gujarat. In 1972, she received again a M.A. in Sociology from Texas Woman's University.

Shelat started her career as a lecturer of Sanskrit and Ardhamagadhi at S. V. Arts College, Ahmedabad in 1964, and served there till 1969. In 1976, she joined B. J. Institute as a lecturer of Indian culture, philosophy and Sanskrit literature, and later became there a reader and post graduate teacher (1982–1997), and then, professor and director (1997–2006). She served as a director of Gujarat Research Society, Ahmedabad.

Shelat received the Haridas Gokani Gold Medal for the best research paper in the 9th Conference of Gujarat History Council, 1977.

Shelat died in 2018.

== Works ==
Shelat published about 200 articles in different fields including epigraphy, numismatics, iconography, Sanskrit language and literature, manuscriptology, Indian chronology, and editing method of Sanskrit words. She edited about 40 Sanskrit inscriptions and documents. She worked as a general editor of the critical edition of Śrīmad Bhāgavata Purāṇa, as an editor of its volume II and III. She worked as an editor of 4 journals; Samipya, Journal of Gujarat Research Society, Vidyapeeth, and Pathik.

=== English ===
- Chronological System of Gujarat (1987)
- Girnar Rock Edict of Mahākșatrapa Rudradāman (2005)
- Girnar Rock Inscription of Gupta Emperor Skandagupta (2005)
- Khatapatras of Ahmedabad (2011)

=== Gujarati ===
- Bharatiya Samskaro (1983)
- Aadim Jationi Sanskritio (Culture of Primitive Societies; 1983)
- Bharatno Aadya Itihas (Proto History of India; 1985)
- Gujaratna Abhilekho : Svādhyāya ane Samikshā (1992)
- Lipi (Script; 2005)
- Gujaratna Shilalekho ane Sikkao (Inscription and Coins of Gujarat; 2007)
- History of Sanskrit Lexicography (2016)

== See also ==
- List of Gujarati-language writers
