= Geeta Parikh =

Indian poet (1929-2012)

Geeta Sooryakant Parikh (11 August 1929 – 7 April 2012) was an Indian poet who wrote in Gujarati. Educated in philosophy, she had published two poetry collections and a biography collection.

== Biography ==
Geeta Parikh was born on 11 August 1929 in Bhavnagar in a Jain family of Vijayaben and Paramanand Kapadia. Her father was a social worker and independence activist. She completed her primary and secondary school education from the Fellowship School in Bombay (now Mumbai). She matriculated in 1945. She completed BA in Entire Philosophy with second class in 1949 from the Wilson College and later MA in the same subject in 1952. In 1988, she received PhD for her thesis Arvachin Gujarati Kavayitrio (Modern Gujarati Women Poets) under Dhiru Parikh. She briefly taught in a college.

In 1953, she married Gandhian Sooryakant Parikh (9 January 1926 – 5 April 2019) who was active in Bhoodan movement and supported him in his activities. After having children, she shifted her focus on the family.

She worked with the English Club of Sharda Mandir school in Ahmedabad. She also learned classical and other forms of music starting 1974.

She died on 7 April 2012.

== Literary career ==
In 1950, Parikh learned metres from Ramnarayan V. Pathak and was guided by Rajendra Shah. She started developing interest in poetry and her first poem "Maru Lagna" (My Marriage) was published in Kumar in 1951.

Parikh had written almost all forms of poem. She had written more than 900 poems and selected one hundred were published in the collection Purvi in 1966. These poems focus on sentiments of love, married life, and philosophy. Purvi was awarded the first prize by the Government of Gujarat. In 1979, she published her second poetry collection, Bhinash, which included poems on nature, family life, death of parents, and devotion.

Parikh had also edited a brief biography collection titled Sitter Gujarati Kavayitrio (Seventy Gujarati Women Poets, 1985), which includes biographies from her thesis. Kavyaspandita (1988) is a collection of criticism. She co-edited essays of her father in Chintanyatra (1974) and translated poems of Vimala Thakar in Navo Palato (1963).

== See also ==
- List of Gujarati-language writers
