= Manubhai Jodhani =

Gujarati writer, folklorist, ornithologist, botanist and editor

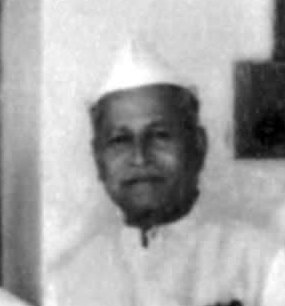
- Jodhani around 1946
- Born: Manubhai Jodhani; 28 October 1902; Barwala, British India
- Died: 1979 (aged 73–74)
- Occupations: Writer, folklorist, ornithologist, botanist, editor

Manubhai Lallubhai Jodhani (28 October 1902 – 29 December 1979) was a Gujarati writer, folklorist, ornithologist, botanist and editor from Gujarat, India. He had published more than 15 books.

== Biography ==
Jodhani was born on 28 October 1902, in Barwala (now in Botad district, Gujarat, India). He received his primary school education at Limbdi. He became a school teacher in Barwala in 1920. In 1930, he resigned to join the Indian Independence Movement. Following Mahatma Gandhi's Salt Satyagraha, an independence activist Amrutlal Sheth decided to hold Satyagraha at Dholera. Jodhani played a leading role in Dholera Salt Satyagraha and the British Police had issued an arrest warrant for Jodhani.

Later he joined the Jivanlal Amarshi Booksellers. He also worked with various magazines including Stribodh as a sub editor as well as Strijivan as an editor for 39 years. He was a member of a committee formed by the Government of Gujarat to promote folk literature.

He died on 29 December 1979. His son Vasantkumar Jodhai was also a writer who published works on science and animals.

== Works ==
Jodhani has contributed considerably in the field of folk literature. He was an ornithologist and botanist. He pioneered story writings on flora and fauna of Gujarat.

His works on folk literature include Sorathi Javahir (1930), Sorathi Vibhuto (1964), Randalna Geeto, Gujarati Loksahitya Mala (cowritten with Manjula Majmudar, Bachubhai Raval) and Janpad (1940, 1944, 1955; sketches).

His short stories include Shilvati (1928) and Sundariona Shangar. Nagmati (1932) is his only novel. Khatimithi Balavato and Kumaroni Pravaskatha are works of children's literature.

Padarni Vanaspati I-II (1954–55), Anganana Pankhi I-II (1955–56), Padarna Pankhi (1956) are his works on botany and ornithology.

He translated Sarat Chandra Chattopadhyay's Bindur Chhele as Bindu (1939).

He helped to publish Manuben Gandhi's memoir, Last Glimpses of Bapu.

== Recognition ==
There is a road named after him in Paldi, Ahmedabad.

== See also ==
- List of Gujarati-language writers
