= Shridhar Vyas =

- Born: later 14th century Idar
- Died: Idar
- Occupation: Poet Warrior Advisor
- Notable work: Ranmall Chhand; Dasham Skandh

Shridhar Vyas was a 14th-15th century poet from western India. He is known for his historical and heroic poetry, Ranmall Chhand.

== Life ==
There is not much information regarding his personal life. Vyas is a designation of the Brahman performing religious tasks in royal households or society. He was probably an officer in royal court with this designation. K. M. Munshi portrays him as a poet patronized by the king.

He is associated with Ranmall, the Rathore Rajput ruler of Idar.

== Works ==
He is known for Ranmall Chhand, the historic-heroic poem written circa 1400. It describes the defeat of Muzzafar Shah I (Zafar Khan), the Muslim governor of Anhilwad Patan appointed by Delhi Sultanate, at Ahmedabad by Ranmall in 1398. It is considered one of the best heroic poetry of Old Gujarati which is mixed with Avahatatha, the artificial literary speech of court poets. He may have personally witnessed the battle. It is also historical work as its veracity can be verified by contemporary Muslim chronicles. The poem starts with ten Sanskrit verses followed by 60 Gujarati verses full of words of Persian and Arabic origin. It employs words with consonants to produce heroic feelings. His description of battle, characterization of hero and metrical patterns made it unique in Gujarati literature.

His Dasham Skandh is a Gujarati version of the 10th book of Bhagavata Purana. There are only 127 verses of its incomplete form available due to fragmentary manuscript.

He has also written Saptashati Chhand or Ishvari Chhand which is also heroic poem based on Durga Saptashi, the part of Markandeya Purana. It has 120 verses.

== See also ==
- List of Gujarati-language writers
