= H. N. Golibar =

Gujarati Writer

H. N. Golibar or Bholabhai Golibar, (24 November 1949 – 19 December 2024) also known by his pen name Atom Golibar, was the editor of the Gujarati weekly Chakram Chandan. He was also a prolific Gujarati pulp fiction novelist who wrote mostly horror and crime thrillers.

== Life ==
Golibar was born 24 November 1949 at Ahmedabad, India in Kutchi Memon family. He completed the Bachelor of Arts in English literature and a Diploma in Journalism. He later completed a Diploma in Printing from the Heidelberg Pressman School in West Germany. In 1971, Golibar joined his father Noormohammad Jussabhai Golibar, better known as N. J. Golibar, who published Chakram weekly since 1947 from Ahmedabad. The magazine was later renamed Chakram Chandan and stopped accepting advertisements in 1976. It continued to be ad-free through 2021, when it closed due to pressures from the COVID-19 pandemic. H. N. Golibar also wrote and edited several columns in the magazine.

Golibar died on 19 December 2024, after suffering a brain hemorrhage.

== Works ==
Golibar wrote more than 85 books, mostly crime and horror novels which first appeared serialised in Chakram Chandan.

His books include Jantar Mantar (1985), Khel Khatarnaak (1993), Janamteep (1993), Alla Balla (1993), Raatrani (1993), Kal Kundali (1993), Bhoot Palit (1994), Jinnaat (1994), Chhaya Padchhaya (1995), Kaaman Tuman (1997), Santakukdi (1997), Shukan Apshukan (1998), Nilja Karanth (1998), Khelando (1998), Herapheri (2001), Bhoot Pishach (2001), Dhummas (2001), Sohaganna Sapna (2002), File Number Satso Saat (2002), Varasdar (2003), Chhal Chhalochhal (2003), Jallad (2003), Shikanjo (2003), Padchhaya Motna (2003), Ghor Aghori (2004), 31 December (2004), Pagala Pachhal Pagala (2004), Tarap (2009), Dankh (2009), Malin Mantar (2009), Chahera Mahora (1995), Saapsidi (1995) are his social novels. He also published the monthly science magazine Science City.

Golibar also contributed a humorous question-and-answer column, Gajab Jawabo, to the Gujarati daily paper Navgujarat Samay.

== See also ==
- List of Gujarati-language writers
