= Viru Purohit =

Viru Purohit (born 20 April 1950), full name Virendrarai Vrijlal Purohit, is a Gujarati poet and playwright from Gujarat, India.

== Life ==
Viru Purohit was born on 20 April 1950 at Bhayavadar village in Saurashtra State (now Gujarat). He completed his Secondary School Certificate (S.S.C.) in 1966. He completed B. A. in 1972, M. A. in 1975. He received Ph.D. in 2002 for his thesis Kavyano Samajik Dharm (Social Responsibility of Poetry). He joined the Sales department of Mukund Iron and Steel Works, Mumbai in 1975. He worked as the visiting professor of Gujarati in several colleges of Gujarat from 1981 to 1990. He works as the professor of Gujarati in Dr. Subhas Mahila Arts College, Junagadh since 1990.

He married in 1979 and later separated from his wife.

== Works ==
Vans Thaki Vahaveli (1982) was his first poetry collection which has 51 songs, 17 ghazals and 9 metrical poems written between 1968 and 1975. Agiyarami Disha (2000) has 68 songs and 40 ghazals. Chhalna Vagar is his other poetry collection. Atikraman (2012) is his novel.

Purohit has written two-act play Puru Ane Paushti (2001). His Ph.D. thesis Kavyano Samajik Dharma (2003) is a work of criticism.

== Awards ==
Puru Ane Paushti (2001) received the prize from Gujarat Sahitya Akademi and from Gira Gurjari, Mumbai. Agiyarami Disha (2002) was awarded Jayant Pathak Poetry Prize.

== See also ==
- List of Gujarati-language writers
