= Kishorsinh Solanki =

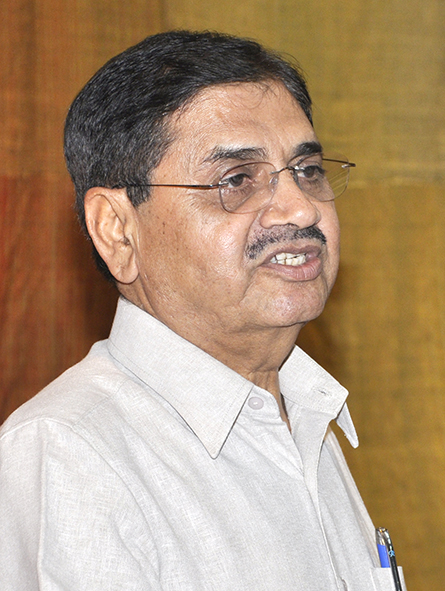
- at Gujarat Vishwakosh Trust, July 2012
- Born: Kishorsinh Hinduji Solanki; 1 April 1949 (age 77); Magarwada, Banaskantha district, Gujarat
- Education: MA, PhD
- Occupations: Poet, novelist, professor
- Writing career
- Language: Gujarati

Kishorsinh Hinduji Solanki is a Gujarati poet and novelist from Gujarat, India. He is an editor of Shabdasar, a Gujarati literary magazine.

== Life ==
Kishorsinh Solanki was born on 1 April 1949 at Magarwada village in Banaskantha district. He completed his S. S. C. in 1969. He completed BA in Gujarati in 1973 and MA from School of Languages, Gujarat University in 1975. He later received PhD.

He taught at Arts College, Modasa and later joined Arts College, Mahudha where he served as the professor and later the Head of the Department. He was the principal of Samarpan Arts and Commerce College, Gandhinagar from 1996. He is an editor of Shabdasar magazine.

== Works ==
Kishorsinh Solanki has written traditional as well as experimental poetry. Vinyas (1981), Karan (1989), Premakshar (1995), Ajanyo Tapu (1997), Manasane Mele (1998) are his poetry collections. Dhoopchanv (2006) is his Hindi poetry collection.

Kishorsinh Solanki wrote two novellas in 1977; Razalata Divas and Ritu. They are followed by these novels: Bhaicharo (1987), Grahan (1992), Veerwada (1994), Adadha Akashe Ugato Sooraj (1995), Vasvaso (1997) and Alay (1997). Bhaicharo was written as Bhav ten years ago which includes his experiences of village life before moving to the city. Aravalli (2007) is his experimental narrative novel written in the autobiographical style. Padarma Ugata Pagala (1989) is his story on his native place while Sahpravasi (1989) is a collection of short stories. His story Masari depicted oppressed people. Bheeni Matini Mahek (1988), Pankhini Pankhma Padar (1997) and Shabdasar (1997) are his collections of essays. Kala Panina Kinare (Andaman and Nicobar Islands, 1989) and Desh Re Joya Pardesh Joya (1989) are his travelogues. He has edited Vikalpani Vistari Kshitijo (1982), Manavi Marjeeva (1987), Janpadi Navalkatha, Vibhavna Ane Vikas (1994), Eksath Sonnett (2000), Gujarati Nimbandh Shrishti (2006), Gujarati Bhasha Sahityanu Adhyapan (2006), Ghooghara Ghamake Se (2017).

== Awards ==
He has received the Critics Award (1984) and the Balwantray K. Thakor Prize (1989).

== See also ==
- List of Gujarati-language writers
