= Rambha Gandhi =

Gujarati writer (1911–1986)

- Born: 27 April 1911; Sarwal
- Died: 29 March 1986 (aged 74)
- Citizenship: Indian
- Occupations: Playwright; Short story writer; Essayist; Poet
- Writing career
- Language: Gujarati
- Notable work: Sansarsagarne Teerethi (1969)
- Notable awards: Bhagini Nivedita Prize

Rambha Manmohan Gandhi (27 April 1911 – 29 March 1986) was an Indian Gujarati language writer who wrote plays, short stories, songs, and essays, publishing 44 books in her career.

== Life ==
Gandhi was born on 27 April 1911 in Sarwal village near the city of Dhandhuka, now in the Indian state of Gujarat. She completed her B.A. in economics and the humanities from Karve University in 1937. In 1926, she married Manmohan Gandhi. During her career, she was a member of the Central Board of Film Certification from 1949 to 1953 and a Councillor Member of the Bombay Municipal School Committee from 1950 to 1954 in addition to her involvement with several other social organisations. From 1970 to 1977, she edited a periodical of the Jain society. She died on 29 March 1986.

== Works ==
Gandhi knew several languages: Gujarati, Hindi, English, Bengali, and Marathi. She was a prolific playwright, writing and participating in more than 400 radio plays for All India Radio in Mumbai. Her plays Prayashchit and Manthan were translated into other languages. Several of her one-act plays, such as Aarati and Insaaf, highlighted contemporary middle-class life with light humour and satire.

Between 1951 and 1983, she published more than 44 books. Her play collections include Koine Kahesho Nahi (1951), Pranayna Rang (1952), Rojni Ramayan (1953), Chakmak (1955), Paranu To Tane Ja (1957), Dev Tevi Pooja (1958), Prekshako Maaf Kare (1961), Preet Na Kariyo Koi (1963), Rajane Gami Te Rani (1965), Aandhi (1977), Jeevan Natak (1982), and Wrong Number (1985).

A number of Gandhi's published works were original short story collections, including Peepal Paan Kharanta (1966) and Mazdhar (1973), as well as adapted short story collections such as Timire Tamtamta Tarla (1966), Preetni Nyari Reet (1978), and Jay-Parajay (1983). She also adapted a novel, Zanzavana Jal (1979).

Her Teer Ane Tukka (1959) is a collection of satirical essays, while Sansarsagarne Teerethi (1969) is a collection of letters. She also published essay collections: Sabaras (1969), Nava Yugni Navi Katha (1975), Harine Hasata Ditha (1978), and Tamane Ketala Thaya? 60, 70, 80? (1985).

Gandhi also released two collections of jokes and quotes, Anand Gulal (1964) and Anand Mangal (1973). Her other works include a proverb collection, Binduma Sindhu (1972); a song collection, Mare Geet Madhura Gava Chhe (1975); and motivational sketches, Satsage Sadvichar (1977) and Santono Sang Karie (1983). She edited Lagnageeto and Lagnageetoni Gunthani in 1951.

Sansarsagarne Teerethi and Bharati Ane Ot were awarded the Bhagini Nivedita Prize.

== See also ==
- List of Gujarati-language writers
