= Pitambar Patel =

Pitambar Narsinhbhai Patel (10 August 1918 – 24 May 1977), also known by his pen name Pinakpani, was an Indian novelist, short story writer and journalist from Gujarat.

== Biography ==
Patel was born on 10 August 1918 in Shelavi village (now in Mehsana district, Gujarat, India). He completed his primary school education from Shelavi and Pansar villages. He completed his secondary education from Sarva Vidyalaya, Kadi. He matriculated in 1936 and completed BA from L. D. Arts College, Ahmedabad in 1940 as well MA from Gujarat Vidhya Sabha Post-graduation Centre in 1942. He worked with Akashvani, Ahmedabad for few years starting 1956. He had established a Bhavai group. He worked with Amdavad Lekhak Milan and served as Secretary of Gujarati Sahitya Parishad for sixteen years. He was associated with Sandesh daily. He was involved in film production as well. He served as a member and the president of Panchayat Sewa Commission of Gujarat.

He died on 24 May 1977 in Ahmedabad.

== Works ==
Patel wrote under various pen names including Pinakpani, Rajhans and Saujanya. Influenced by Mahatma Gandhi, he is considered as a successor of writers like Pannalal Patel and Ishwar Petlikar.

He gave picture of social life of Gujarat in his novels. His regional novels focus on social reforms, changes and dawn of new era. His novels show realism as well as idealism depicting thoughts and mind of the people. They are also known for their lucid depiction of local and rural life in old and established style of narrative of the time. His novels are: Rasiyo Jeev (1942), Parivartan (1944), Ugyu Prabhat (1950), Khetarne Khole (Volume 1-2, 1952), Tejrekha (1952), Ashabhari (1954), Antarna Ajwala (1960), Chirantan Jyot (1960), Dharatina Ami (Volume 1-2, 1962), Kevadiyano Kanto (1965), Dharatina Moja (1966), Gharno Mobh.

He had written several novellas with variety of subjects from urban to rural life and common to film industry life. Vagdana Phool (1944), Kholano Khundnar Ane Biji Vato, Milap (1950), Shraddhadeep (1952), Kalpana (1954), Chhutachheda (1955), Shamanani Rakh (1956), Neel Gaganna Pankhi (1964), Roodi Sarvariyani Pal (1964), Zulta Minara (1966), Kirti Ane Kaldar, Sonanu Indu, Kesudana Phool, Kar Le Singar are his short story collections.

His sketches include Rakhno Dhagalo, Dharam Taro Sambhal Re, Gamdani Kedie, Veerpasali, Navo Avatar, Limbadani Ek Daal Mithi, Sarvodaypatra, Saubhagyano Shangar (1963), Satno Deevo (1965), Dharatino Jayo, Ramnamni Parab.

Nootan Bharatna Teerath (Volume 1-5) is his travelogue. Manasaini Vato and Mangal Vato are edited by him. He edited Aram, a short story monthly, for years.

== See also ==
- List of Gujarati-language writers
