= Anwarmiya Kaji =

Gujarati Poet

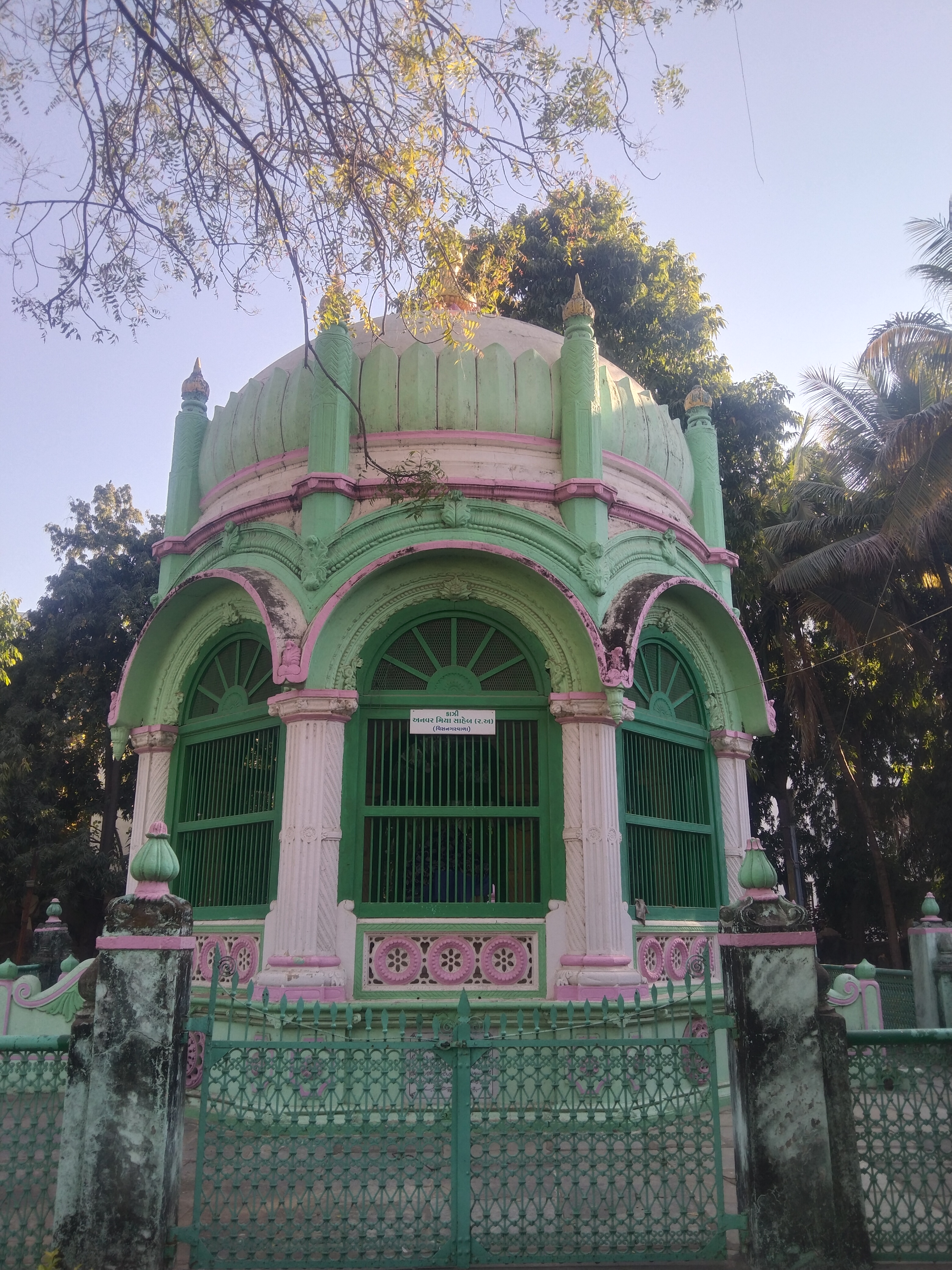
Mausoleum of Anwarmiya Kaji in Palanpur

Anwarmiya Ajamiya Kaji (1843 – 22 October 1916) was a poet from Gujarat, India.

== Biography ==
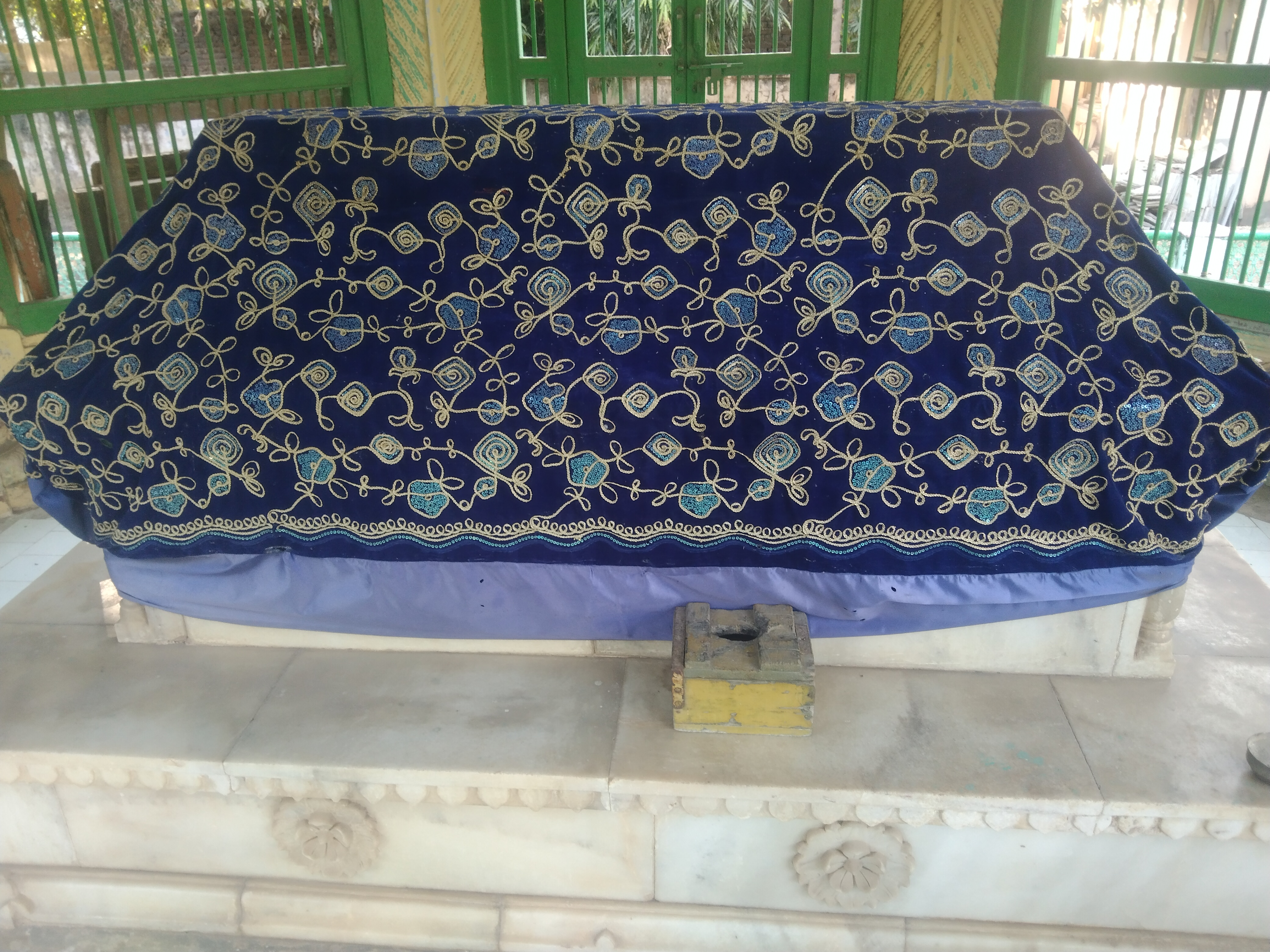
Grave of Kaji in mausoleum

Anwarmiya was born in 1843 in Visnagar to Ajamiya Anumiya. His family had roots in Arabia who moved to Patan and served as Kaji (local judge). They were granted Visnagar for activity so they settled there. Anwarmiya had interest in spirituality since his childhood. At the age of 12, he served Premmast Saiyyd Saheb when he visited Visnagar and had deep influence of him. Initially resided at lonely places but later moved to old mosque in Kajiwada on insistence of his relatives and followers. He visited Mecca and Madina in 1881. He contracted illness and moved to Palanpur where he died on 22 October 1916. A mausoleum was built over his resting place and the Urs is organised there every year.

== Works ==
Anwarmiya Kaji had knowledge of six orthodox schools of Hindu philosophy and Yoga. His Anwarkavya includes several spiritual poems about Bhakti. He composed in Gujarati as well as Urdu. His poetry defines Bhakti in form of Sufism. He has also composed devotional hymns of Rama and Krishna.

== See also ==
- List of Gujarati-language writers
