= Narmadashankar Mehta =

Gujarati writer, historian of philosophy, and administrator from British India (1871-1939)

Dewan Bahadur Narmadashankar Mehta
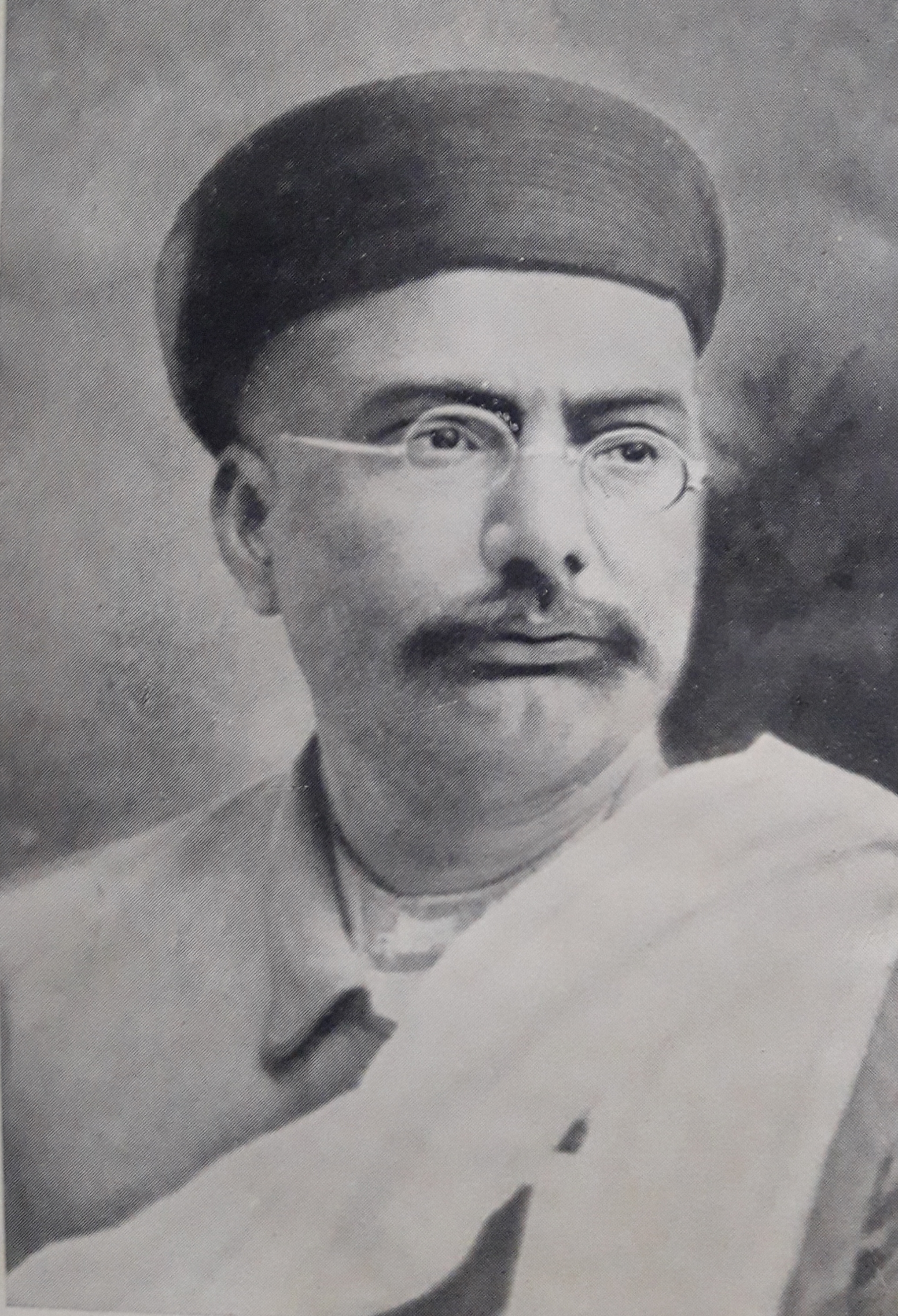
- Born: Narmadashankar Devshankar Mehta; 23 August 1871; Ahmedabad, British India
- Died: 21 March 1939 (aged 67)
- Occupations: Writer, historian, and administrator
- Children: Yashodhar Mehta
- Writing career
- Language: Gujarati

Dewan Bahadur Narmadashankar Devshankar Mehta (23 August 1871 – 21 March 1939) was a Gujarati writer, historian of philosophy, and administrator from British India. He was a student of Anandshankar Dhruv, and a nephew of Balashankar Kantharia.

== Biography ==
Mehta was born in Sathodara Nagar Brahmin family on 23 August 1871 in Ahmedabad, to his parents Devshankar, a revenue officer, and Rukshmani (Rukmini).

After passing his matriculation exam in 1888, he graduated from Bombay University in 1894 with English and Sanskrit literature. He was appointed fellow at Gujarat College, Ahmedabad, where he became student of Anandshankar Dhruv, which led him to study Sanskrit culture and Indian philosophy. In 1896, he joined revenue department at Ahmedabad as clerk, and was later appointed a deputy commissioner of municipality. At later point of his life, he served as a dewan of Khambhat state.

In 1934, he suffered a paralytic stroke which caused his death five years later, on 21 March 1939. His son Yashodhar Mehta was also a Gujarati writer and novelist. Mehta was a nephew of Gujarati writer Balashankar Kantharia.

== Works ==
Mehta wrote his works in Gujarati, English and Sanskrit. He published around a hundred scholarly articles in various magazines about Hindu religion and Indian philosophy. His writings are marked by clarity of thought, strictly scientific and objective approach and lucid style.

He started his literary career by writing a play Sati Natak in 1885. In 1892, he translated into Gujarati Totakacharya's Śrutisārasamuddharaņa and Appayya Dikshita's Vairagyashataka. His Hind Tattvajnan No Itihas (History of Indian Philosophy), published in two parts in 1924 and 1925 respectively, is a historical narrative of Hindu philosophy. It was the first of its kind in the history of Gujarati literature. According to some scholars, it maintains the historical sequence of the Darshanas of Indian philosophy more correctly than Surendranath Dasgupta and Sarvepalli Radhakrishnan, and notes some historical facts that other scholars have failed to do. In 1932, he published Upanishadavicharana and Shakta Sampradaya (History of Shaktism). Suprajan Shastr and Sandhyakarma Vivaran are his other works.

Dharmatatva-Vichar, edited by Anantrai Raval, was published posthumously in four volumes (1972, 1977, 1978 & 1980), which contains his writings on literature, religion and philosophy.

== See also ==
- List of Gujarati-language writers
