= Daksha Vyas =

Daksha Vyas (born 26 December 1941) is a Gujarati poet, critic and editor from Gujarat, India.

== Life ==
Daksha Vyas was born on 26 December 1941 at Vyara (now in Tapi district, Gujarat). She completed primary and secondary education in Vyara. She received B.A. in 1962 from Surat, M.A. in 1965 and Ph.D. in 1978 for her thesis Swatantryottar Gujarati Kavita: Paridarshan. She taught Gujarati in Gurukul Mahila College in Porbandar from 1967 to 1973 and later in Arts College, Vyara from 1973 until retirement.

== Works ==
Daksha Vyas is a poet, critic and editor.

Alpana (2000) is her poetry collection. Bhavpratibhav (1981), Saundaryadarshi Kavio (1984), Roopak Granthi (1988), Anusarga (1998), Adivasi Samaj (2001) and Pariprekshana (2004) are her works of criticism. Atamne Ajwale (2004) is her philosophical work while Tatvacharcha (1988), Chal Man Vyara Nagari (1997) and Sarjakna Sannidhye are edited by her. Saundaryadarshi Kavio includes study and criticism of four leading poets of 1950s; Rajendra Shah, Niranjan Bhagat, Ushnas and Jayant Pathak. Sanmukham is her other work.

== See also ==
- List of Gujarati-language writers
