= Kishore Jadav =

Gujarati author (1938–2018)

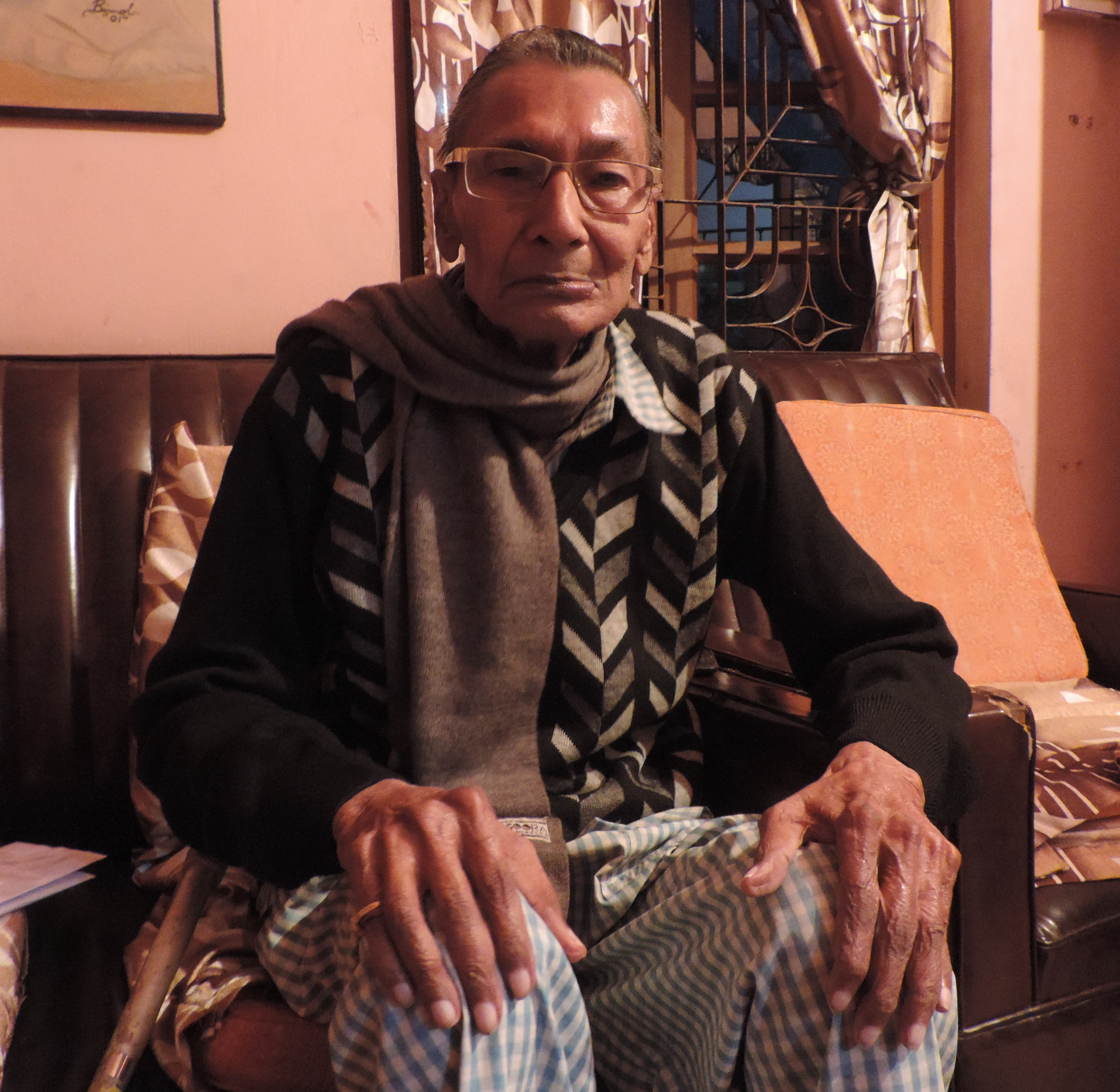
- At his home in Nagaland, December 2017
- Born: 15 April 1938; Ambaliala, Dholka Taluka, Ahmedabad district, Gujarat
- Died: 1 March 2018 (aged 79); Dimapur, Nagaland
- Education: M.Com; PhD
- Alma mater: M. S. University; Gauhati University
- Occupations: Short story writer, novelist, scholar
- Spouse: Kumsangkola (m. 1967; died 2011)
- Writing career
- Language: Gujarati
- Period: Modern Gujarati literature
- Notable works: Pragaitihasika ane Shoksabha (1969); Nishachakra(1979); Navi Tunki Vartani Kalamimansa (1986)

Signature
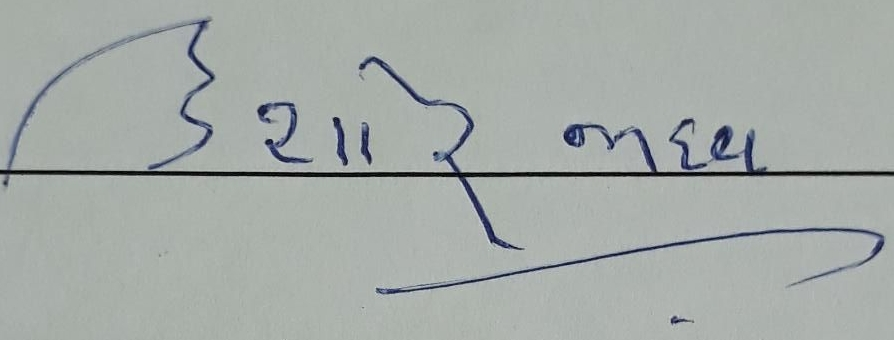

Kishore Kalidas Jadav (15 April 1938 – 1 March 2018) was a novelist, critic, and short story writer from India. He wrote in Gujarati and was primarily responsible for the development of surreal and experimental Gujarati fiction.

== Life ==
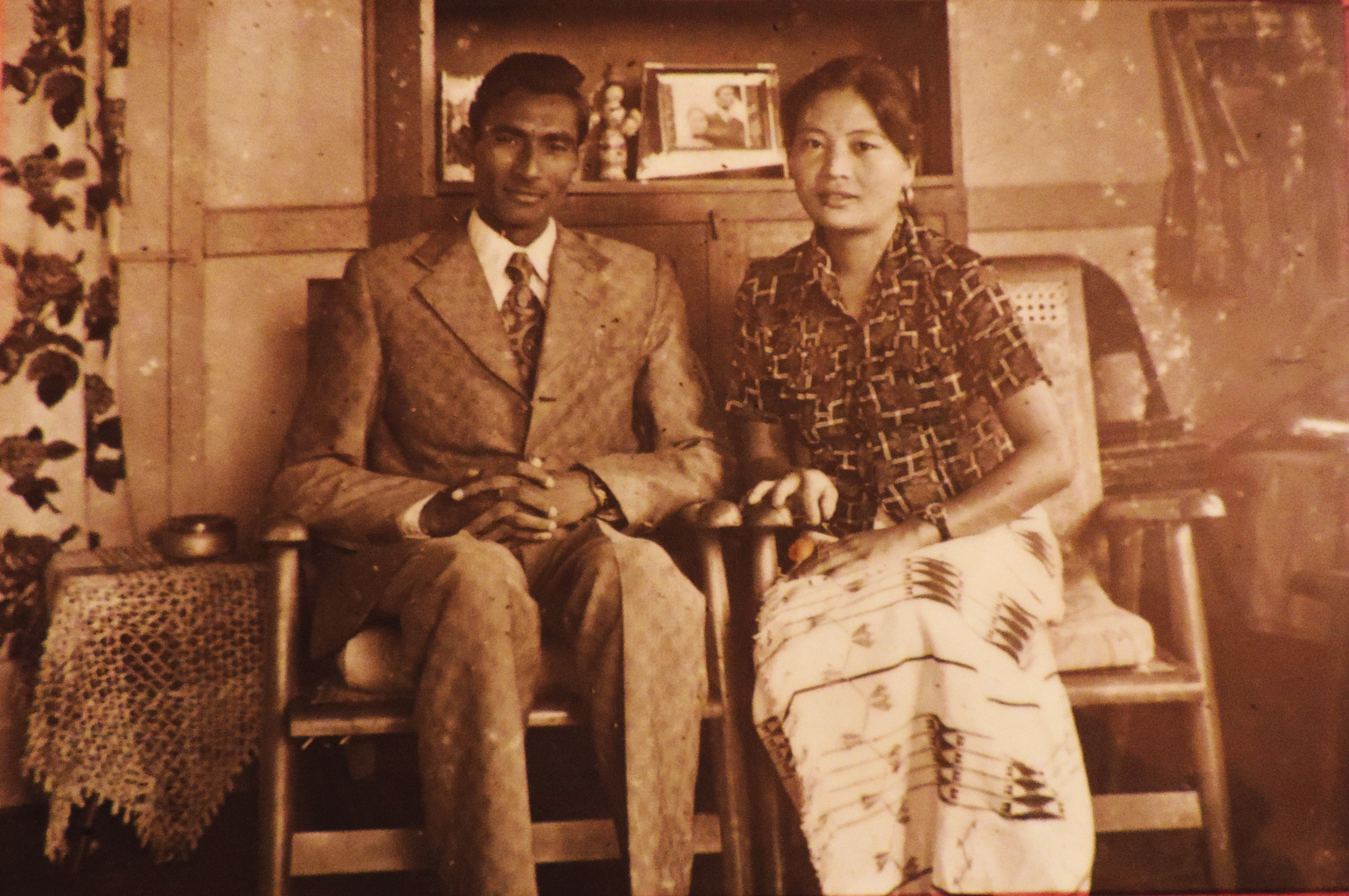
Kishore Jadav with his wife Kumsangkola

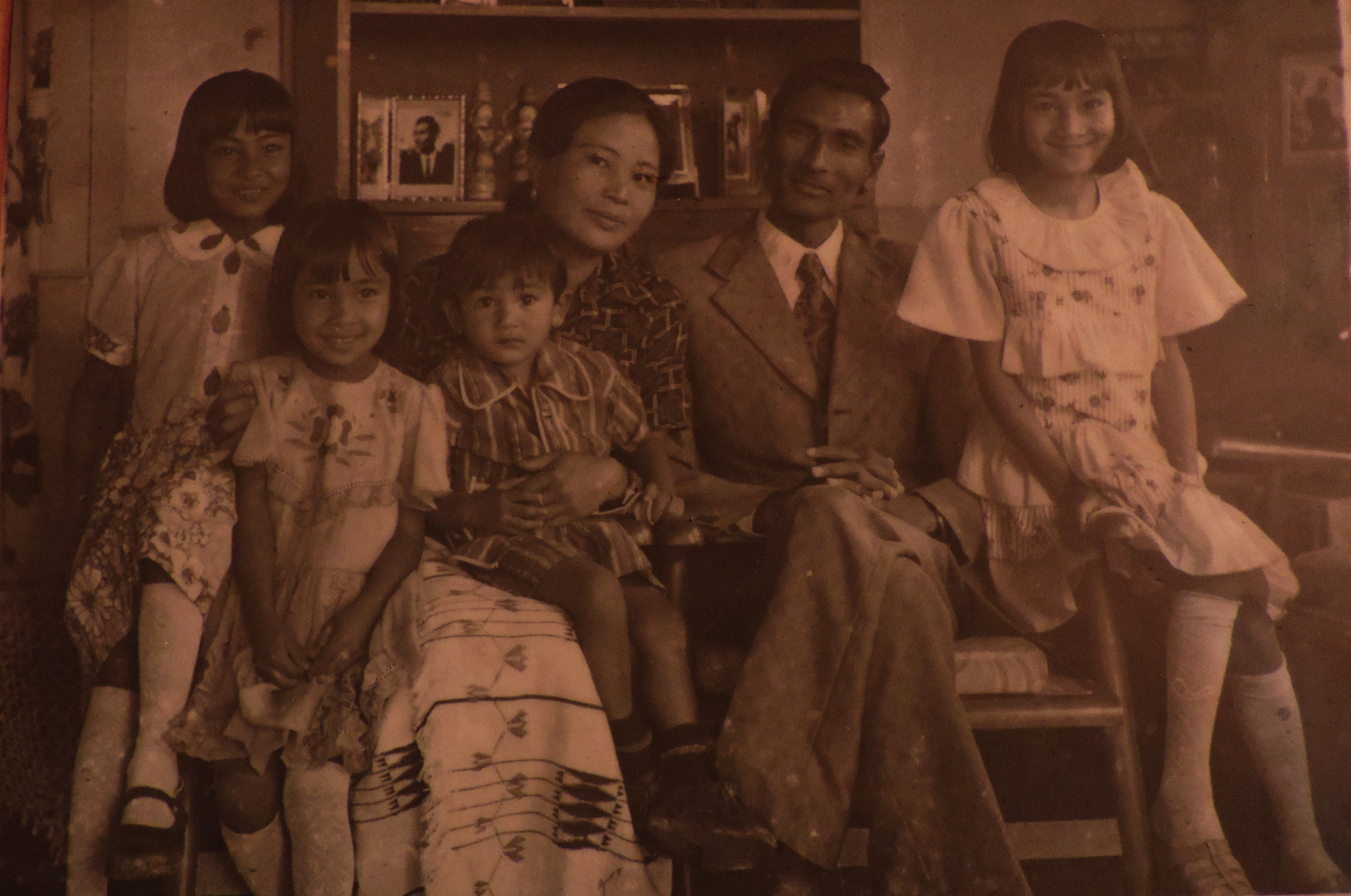
Kishore Jadav with his wife and children

Kishore Jadav was born on 15 April 1938 in Ambaliala village of Dholka Taluka in Ahmedabad district, Gujarat, to Kalidas and Dahiben Jadav.

He matriculated in 1955 from R.C. Commerce High School, Ahmedabad, and completed a Bachelor of Commerce from Maharaja Sayajirao University of Baroda in 1960. In 1963, he moved to Nagaland.

In 1972, he completed a Masters of Commerce from Gauhati University and later received a Ph.D. from California International University for his research work American Black Writers.

He was awarded a Doctor of Letters by Harmony College of Applied Science, California, US. From 1965 to 1982, he worked as a secretary with various departments of the Government of Nagaland. In 1967 he married Kumsangkola, a Naga tribal girl. They had two sons and three daughters.

Jadav served as a secretary to the Chief Secretary of the Government of Nagaland in 1982 and retired in 1995. He also served as a Registrar of Nagaland University, and later retired as the Special Secretary.

He served as a chairman of the Northeast Literary Academy from its foundation in 1976 until 1981 and later served as its vice president. He was a fellow and deputy governor of the American Biographical Institute. He lived in Kohima until his retirement in 1995, then moved to Dimapur, Nagaland.

Kumsangkola died in 2011. Jadav died on 1 March 2018 in Dimapur following kidney failure and a stroke.

== Works ==
Jadav experimented with fiction and adopted a surrealistic style of narration. His short stories were first published in Ruchi, a magazine edited by Gujarati author Chunilal Madia. Jadav adopted an unconventional and opposing style to the traditional short stories written in Gujarati, focusing on the depiction of the inner world and character emotion rather than a realistic external world. His story Labyrinth is a notable example of this approach.

His first short story collection, Pragaitihasik and Shoksabha (1969), features 20 experimental stories. Its recurring character, Vinayak (lit. anti-hero), appears in many of the subsequent stories. Suryarohan (1972) includes 17 stories while Chhadmavesh (1982) has 8 stories.

His stories are anthologised in Kishore Jadavni Vartao – Aswad Sahit (1982) and Kishore Jadavni Shreshth Varato (1990, 2009), both edited by Radheshyam Sharma. His fourth collection, Yugsabha, was published in 1995.

Nishachakra (1979) was his first experimental novel. Its main character, Hu (lit. I, myself), encounters three different women with whom he engages in illicit affairs. Sexual behaviour is depicted in the eighth chapter of the novel. Jadav used narrative stream of consciousness in this novel. Nagaland culture is also depicted in his fiction.

Riktarag (1989) also depicts a protagonist in relationships with three ladies, but the world explores a more tragic dimension. Jadav's other novels are Aatash (1993), Chihnakand, and Kathatrayi (1998).

Navi Tunki Vartani Kalamimansa (1986) is his critical work on modern short stories, written in response to questions about the morality of his own stories. Kmiyev (1995) is his other work of criticism.

Kimartham (1995) is a collection of his interviews. He has also published four books in English and two in Hindi.

== Awards ==
Jadav received accolades and awards from Gujarati Sahitya Parishad and the Gujarat Sahitya Academy.

== See also ==
- List of Gujarati-language writers
