= Nagindas Sanghavi =

Indian political writer and columnist (1920–2020)

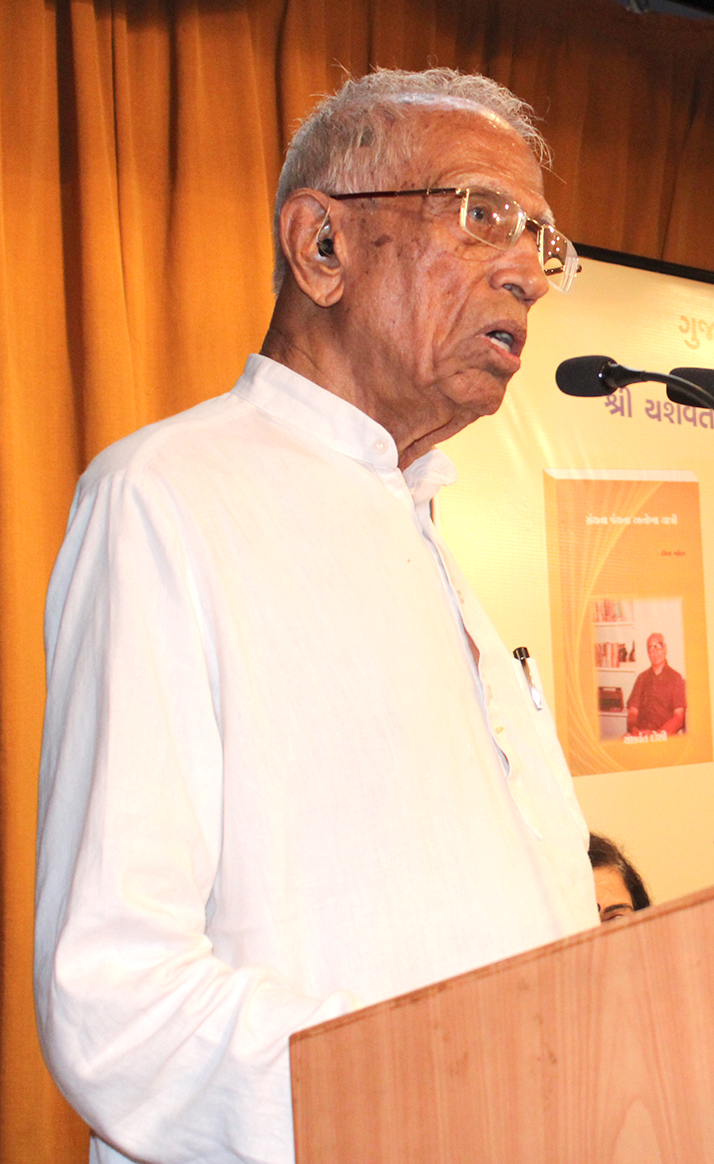
- Nagindas Sanghavi, September 2019
- Born: 10 March 1920; Bhavnagar, Gujarat
- Died: 12 July 2020 (aged 100); Surat, Gujarat, India
- Occupations: political professor, author and columnist
- Writing career
- Language: Gujarati, Hindi, English

Nagindas Sanghavi (10 March 1920 – 12 July 2020) was an Indian political professor, author and columnist writing in English, Hindi and Gujarati. He received Padma Shri, India's fourth highest civilian honour in 2019.

== Biography ==
He was popularly known as "Naginbapa" (Bapa=Grand Father). He was born in Bhavnagar and obtained his education there. After completing his education he started his career as typist in an advertising company on monthly salary of Rupees 30. After couple of other jobs he turned to education. Sanghavi started his teaching career (1951–80) at Bhavan's College, Andheri. He later moved to Ruparel College, Mahim and Mithibai College, Vile Parle teaching political science and History. While teaching at college he had started writing in Newspaper. Post retirement he used to get pension of Rupees 700 which was not sufficient for living and he continued to write.

== Selected works ==
Sanghavi has written overall 29 books in Gujarati and English. He used to write political column in Gujarati Magazine Chitralekha.

- Gujarat: A Political Analysis; (1996) Centre for Social Studies
- Gandhi: The Agony of Arrival - The South Africa Years; (2006) Rupa Publications India
- Gujarat At Cross-Roads; (2010) Bharatiya Vidya Bhavan ISBN 8172764375
- A Brief History of Yoga; (2012) Kinnard Publishing, ISBN 0615650643
- Mahamanav Shrikrushna; (2012) R.R. Seth & Sons ISBN 9382503080
- Narendra Modi; (2017) Navbharat
- Geeta Vimarsh; (2017) Diamond Books ISBN 9386343142
- Sardar Patel - Ek Samarpit Jivan; (2017) Navajivan Trust
- Osho: Vidroh Ane Vivadoni Aaroaar (2021) K Books Rajkot ISBN 9788195366675

== Awards ==
In 2019, Sanghavi had received India's fourth highest civilian honor, Padma Shri in 2019 for his contributions in the field of literature. He has also received Vaju Kotak Gold Medal.

== See also ==
- List of Gujarati-language writers
