= Jayant Khatri =

Gujarati author (1909-1968)

- Born: Jayant Heerji Khatri; 24 September 1909
- Died: 6 June 1968 (aged 58)
- Spouse: Bachuben
- Children: Kirti Khatri (Son)
- Parents: Heerji Hansraj Khatri (father); Jayaben (mother)
- Awards: Uma-Snehrashmi Prize

Jayant Heerji Khatri (1909-1968) was a Gujarati short story writer.

== Life ==
Jayant Khatri was born to Heerji Hansraj Khatri and Jayaben on 24 September 1909 at Mundra, Kutch, Gujarat, India. His father was a government doctor of Cutch State. He completed his primary education from Bhuj and secondary school education from New Bharda Highschool, Mumbai. He matriculated in 1928. He received L.C.P.S. from National Medical College, Mumbai in 1935 and started his medical practice. He later moved to Mandvi. He had close association with labors in Bhuj and Mumbai. He also served as a president of Navik Mandal, Mandvi (Seafarers Association) and later Mandvi Municipality.

He died on 6 June 1968 at Mandvi due to cancer.

== Personal life ==
He married Bachuben from Morjar village in 1929. After death of her first wife, he married his sister-in-law in 1935.

His son Kirti Khatri is an editor of Gujarati daily, Kutchmitra.

== Works ==
He was a progressive writer of his era.

Fora (1944), Vehta Zarna (1952) and Khara Bapor (1968, posthumous) are his collections of short stories totaling forty one stories. Another eight stories are published in various magazines. Varsadni Vadali was his first short story while Dead End was his last. His only novel Chamarchaal was serialised in Pragnyatantra magazine. Mangal Pandey was his one-act play. Several of his stories revolved around Kutch region where he belonged. He was also painter and painted symbols and images for his short stories.

== Racognition ==
He received Uma-Snehrashmi Prize for the year 1968-69 for his work Khara Bapor.

== See also ==
- List of Gujarati-language writers
