= Ansuya Trivedi =

Gujarati writer (born 1924)

- Born: 7 April 1924 Bombay, British India
- Occupation: Editor; Researcher
- Language: Gujarati
- Citizenship: Indian
- Spouse: Bhupendra Trivedi

Ansuya Trivedi (born 7 April 1924) was Gujarati critic, editor and researcher from Gujarat state of India. She studied and later taught Gujarati language and literature in various colleges in Mumbai. With her husband Bhupendra Trivedi, she coedited and researched several works including many on medieval Gujarati poet Akha Bhagat. She had extensively studied and published works on the proverbs in Gujarati.

== Biography ==
Ansuya Trivedi was born on 7 April 1924 in Bombay (now Mumbai). She matriculated in 1941. She studied BA and completed it with first class in 1946. She taught as a Dakshina Fellow in Elphinstone College from 1946 to 1948. She completed MA in 1948 and BT in 1950. In 1966, she was awarded PhD for her thesis Madhyakalin Gujarati Sahityama Prayukt Kahevao (transl. Proverbs used in medieval Gujarati literature) under Harivallabh Bhayani. In 1970, she obtained the Diploma in Linguistics from the University of Mumbai.

She taught Gujarati literature at the SNDT College from 1950 to 1951 followed by at Topiwala College from 1951 to 1952. She returned to the SNDT College in 1956 and was appointed the principal in June 1974. She also advised PhD students there.

She married Bhupendra Balkrishna Trivedi, a writer.

== Works ==
Most of Trivedi's critical, editing and research works are carried out with her husband including several works on medieval Gujarati poet Akha Bhagat. They coedited and published several works including Narhari's Gyangeeta (1964), Akha's Anubhavbindu (1964), Manikyasundarsuri's Prithvichandracharitra (1966), Akha Bhagatna Chhappa: Das Ang (1972), Madhavanal-Kamkandala Prabandh: Ang 6, Duha 266-371 (1975), Akha Bhagatna Chhappa I-II-III (1977, 1980, 1982), Akha Bhagatna Gujarati Pad (1980), Brihad Aratisangrah (1999), Akhana Chabkha (1999).

She has extensively studied and researched the proverbs in Gujarati language. Her Apani Kahevato: Ek Adhyayan (1970) and Gujarati Sahityama Kahevatono Prachar (1973) are extensive academic studies of proverbs. She has carried out comparative study of the proverbs in Sanskrit, Prakrit and medieval Old Gujarati literature with the proverbs in contemporary use. Apani Kahevato: Ek Adhyayan is 120-page study of proverbs, its definition and attributes, subjects, importance, cultural references and traditions.

== See also ==
- List of Gujarati-language writers
