= Nazir Mansuri =

Gujarati novelist and short story writer (born 1965)

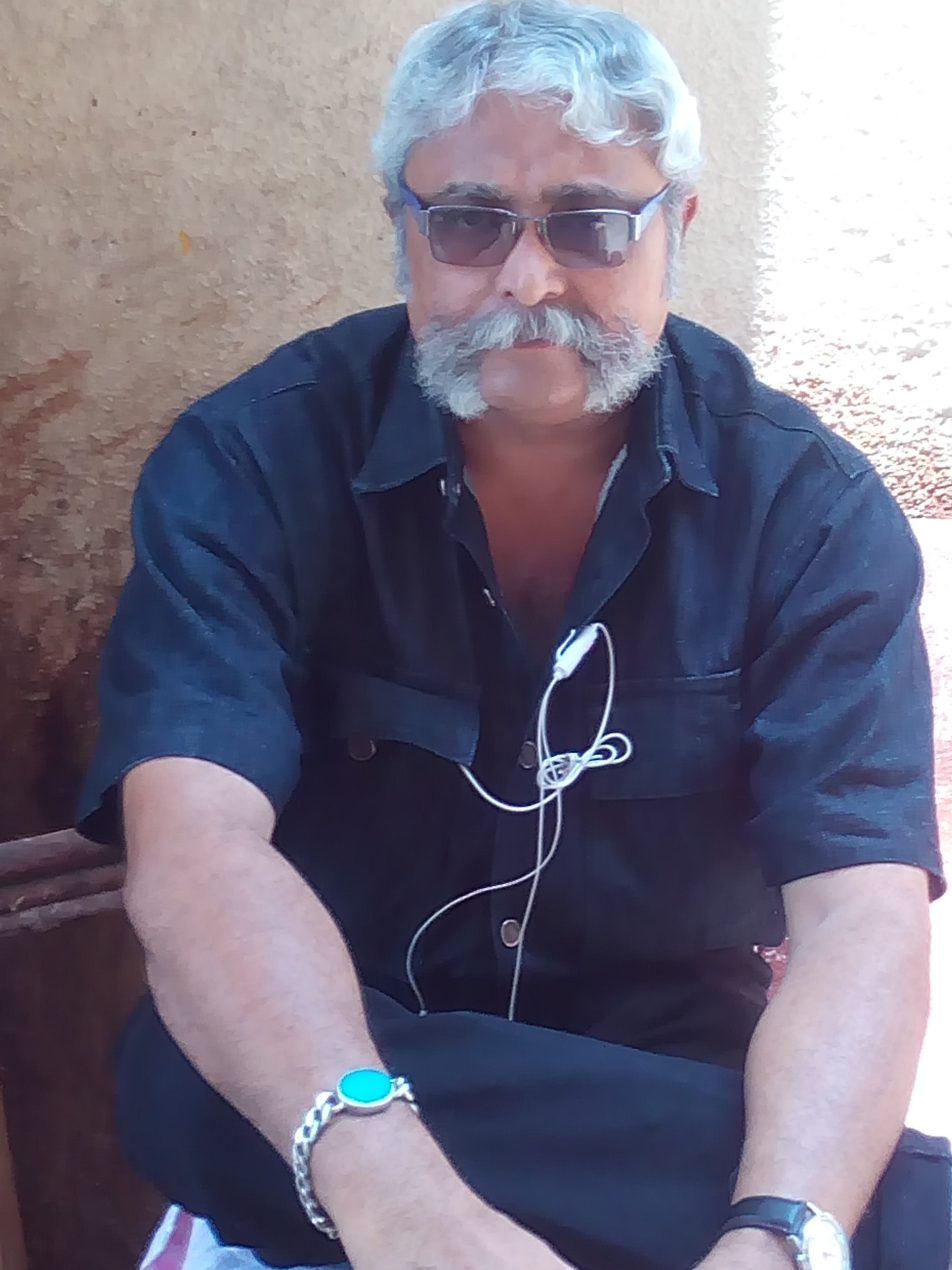
- Born: 1 November 1965 (age 60); Madhvad port near Diu Island, India
- Occupations: Writer, professor
- Writing career
- Genres: Short stories, novel

Nazir Mansuri is a Gujarati language novelist and short story writer. His stories were translated by Sachin Ketkar and Hemang Desai. He is a professor at a college in Navsari.

== Biography ==
Nazir Mansuri was born in 1965. He received Katha Award for creative fiction in 1997 for his short story “Bhuthar”. In 1999, he received Sanskruti Pratishthan Award. His story “Bhuthar” was selected for The Best of the Nineties’ Fiction brought out by Katha Foundation, Delhi.

He works as a lecturer in a college at Navsari, Gujarat. Many of his stories have been translated into English by Sachin Ketkar and Hemang Desai. The translations of his stories have appeared in Indian Literature and New Quest.

== Bibliography ==
Short Story Collections

- Dhal Kachbo, (Published by R.R. Sheth Ahmedabad, 2002)

Novels

- Chandalchakrao' (Published by Parshwa Publications, Ahmedabad, 2009) ISBN 978-93-8029-413-1
- Veshpalto' (Published by Parshwa Publications, Ahmedabad, 2009) ISBN 978-93-80294-12-4
