= Harishchandra Bhatt =

Gujarati poet (1906-1950)

Harishchandra Bhagwatishankar Bhatt (6 December 1906 – 18 May 1950) was an Indian Gujarati-language poet from Gujarat, India, who is primarily known for introducing European literature to Gujarati literature.

== Biography ==
Harishchandra Bhatt was born on 6 December 1906 in Olpad, Surat district of Gujarat, India.

His publications include Safar nu Sakhya (1940), a collection of poems co-authored with Murti Thakur, and Kesudo ane Soneru Tatha Kojagri (1941). His collected poems were published posthumously as Swapnaprayan (1959), edited by Umashankar Joshi. His poetry comprises lyrics, sonnets, songs, descriptive poems, and devotional poems, and explores a wide range of themes. His poem "Nirdosh ne Nirmal Aankh Tari" is among the best-known poems in Gujarati literature.

His poetry reflects the influence of several European writers, including Rainer Maria Rilke, Charles Baudelaire, and Sándor Petőfi, and he was among the early Gujarati poets to introduce their works to Gujarati readers. He inspired post-independence Gujarati poets to engage more deeply with contemporary European literature. He was also influenced by the Gujarati poet and critic Balwantray Thakore.

Bhatt died by suicide on 18 May 1950.
