= Pinakin Dave =

- Born: 10 June 1935 (age 91); Rupal village, Gandhinagar district, Gujarat
- Education: University of Mumbai
- Occupations: novelist, short story writer and literary critic
- Writing career
- Language: Gujarati
- Genres: novel, short story
- Notable works: Vishwajeet (1965); Vivart (1968)

Pinakin Natwarlal Dave (born 1935) is Gujarati language novelist, story writer and critic from Gujarat, India.

== Life ==
Dave was born on 10 June 1935 at Rupal village (now in Gandhinagar district, Gujarat). He matriculated in 1951. He completed B. A. in Sanskrit and Gujarati in 1957, M. A. with Sanskrit and Prakrit in 1959 and LL.B in 1960. In 1963, he received Ph.D. from University of Bombay writing thesis on Jain poet and philosopher Siddhasen Divakar.

He worked as a manager with Easyquip Pvt. Ltd from 1963 to 1968. He joined Vivekanand Arts College, Ahmedabad as a professor from 1968 to his retirement. He edited Anand magazine for brief period. His works are awarded by Gujarati Sahitya Akademi.

== Works ==
Dave is prolific novelist. His Vishwajeet (1965) is based on mythological narratives of Parshuram. Adhar (1964) is a story of nurse and Vivart (1968) is psychological novella of the patient "Kodh". Urdhvabahu (1975) is set in a chawl of Mumbai while Aniket (1976) focuses on a protagonist dwelling in past even though he had left his home. His critically acclaimed Mohnisha (1981) focuses on complexity of contemporary men. His other novels are Anubandh (1978), Prabal Path (1979), Ankh Vinanu Akash (1981), Sat Loknu Antar (1982), Aaa Teer Pele Teer (1983), Kamvan (1984), Mograni Kali (1992), Vishavriksh I-II (1994). Shri Ramayan Navalkatha Shreni is four parts novel series on Ramayana titled Ayodhya, Vardan, Vanvas and Abhishek respectively.

His collections of novellas include Trupti (1969), Dubta Avajo (1977) and Chhidra (1995). Purvapaksh (1978) is work of critic on Sanskrit literature. Nandshankar (1979) is a short biography of Nandshankar Mehta published as a part of series on Gujarati writers Gujarati Granthkar Shreni. His several novels are translated in Hindi and Tamil.
