= Rasik Shah =

Gujarati writer from India

Rasik Shah (12 August 1922, Mumbai - 5 October 2016), was a Gujarati language writer from Gujarat, India. He received Sahitya Akademi Award (2015) for his book Ante Aarambh (part 1, 2), a collection of essays written on philosophy, psychology, mathematics, education and language.
