= Rasa (literary form) =

Rasa (Gujarati: રાસ) or Raso is a certain didactic literary form in Apabhramsa. It is a genre of poetry in Old Gujarati language popular during early period of Gujarati literature. Sometimes the term is used interchangeably with Prabandha of medieval literature.

== History ==
Rasa developed during the period of Gurjar Apbhramsa. It is a period between Hemachandra and Narsinh Mehta. They are mostly written by Jain monks and were performed in Jain temples on certain occasions. Early examples are Updeshrasayan Rasa (1143) by Jinadattasuri, Bharateshwar-Bahubali Raso (1184) by Shilabhadrasuri, Jeevdaya Raso (1200) by Asigu. Sandesa Rasak (15th century) by Abdul Rahman is one example of non-Jain composition. The literary tradition till 19th century. Gajsinh-Raja-no-Rasa (1851) is one late example.

== Form ==
During its earliest form, it was a musical Roopaka (theatrical performance). Vagbhatta describes Rasaka as a soft and vigorous musical Roopaka with a variety of Tala (beat or measure) and Laya (rhythm). Rasaka was played by female dancers. The number of pairs participating can increase up to 64.

There were two types of Rasas; Tala Rasa and Lakuta Rasa. In Tala Rasa the beats of time were matched by claps of hands while in Lakuta Rasa it was matched by clashing of wooden sticks in the hands of performers. So the Rasa was a type of literature intended to be performed by pairs of females dancing and singing in a circle. Tala Rasas were mostly played by females while Lakuta Rasas were mostly played by males. The form is somewhat similar to Rasa dance played in Rasa lila.

As the early Rasas were intended to be performed, they were not lengthy. But over the years, they became lengthy and narrative with elements of story. So the performance aspect may have been diminished. It is doubtful that the Rasas written in 17th and 18th centuries were actually performed. It is most likely that they were only recited.

The Rasas were written in a variety of metres like Doha, Chaupai or Deshi. Rasas were divided into Khanda and different parts were called Bhasha, Thavani, Kadavaka.

They had historical as well as mythological themes. Due to their basic composition meant to be didactic, the early Rasa like the Buddhi Rasa includes only words of advice. In late compositions of 16th to 18th century, they reads heavy and artificial due to incorporation of elements of narration, description, moral instructions and sectarian principles.
