= Works of Narmad =

The Works of Narmadashankar Lalshankar Dave (1833 – 1886), popularly known as Narmad, consist essays, poems, plays and other prose were published in collections by Gujarati. He is considered as the founder of modern Gujarati literature.

He introduced many creative forms of writing in Gujarati. He wrote pioneering work in such forms as autobiography, poetry, lexicography, historical plays and research in folk literature. He was also an outspoken journalist and a pamphleteer. Narmad was a strong opponent of religious fanaticism and orthodoxy. He promoted nationalism and patriotism with famous songs like Sahu Chalo Jeetva Jang, wrote about self-government and talked about one national language, Hundustani, for all of India, nearly five decades before Mahatma Gandhi or Nehru. He wrote a poem Jai Jai Garavi Gujarat in which he listed with a sense of pride all the cultural symbols that go into constituting the Gujarati identity. These symbols include even the things non-Hindu, implying that Gujarat belongs to all the castes, communities, races, religions and sects that inhabit Gujarat. The poem is now state song of Gujarat. Mahatma Gandhi had acknowledged him for his philosophy of nonviolence.

His major collected works are Narmagadya (Gujarati: નર્મગદ્ય), collection of essays; Narmakavita (Gujarati: નર્મકવિતા), collection of poems; Narmakathakosh (Gujarati: નર્મકથાકોશ), collection of stories of characters of mythological literature and Narmakosh (Gujarati: નર્મકોશ), dictionary. His Mari Hakikat, the first autobiography in Gujarati, (Note: In the 1840s, Durgaram Mehta had written his personal diary, Nityanondh but it was not an attempt of autobiography as in western style. Mahipatram Rupram had written a biography, Durgaram Charitra (1879) based on the diary.) was published posthumously. (Note: Narmad had written his autobiography in 1866 but he had requested it to be published posthumously. It was published in 1933, on his birth centenary. Two autobiographies were published before it, Hu Pote (1900) by Narayan Hemchandra and Satyana Prayogo (1925-1929) by Mahatma Gandhi.)

== Poetry ==
His Narmakavita:1-3 (1858), Narmakavita:4-8 (1859) and Narmakavita:9-10 (1860) were collected in Narmakavita:Book 1 (1962). Later Narmakavita:Book 2 (1863) was published. His all poetry were later collected in Narmakavita (1864).

His poem, "Jai Jai Garavi Gujarat", (1873) is used as a de facto state song of Gujarat.

== Prose ==
His Rasapravesh (1858), Pingalpravesh (1857), Alankarpravesh (1858), Narmavyakaran Part I and II (1865), Varnavichar (1865), Nayika Vishaypravesh (1866) are his collections of essays on poetics with historical importance.

Rituvarnan (1861), Hinduoni Padati (1864), Kavicharit (1865), Suratni Mukhtesar Hakikat (1865), Iliadno Sar (1870), Mahipatram Rupram Mehta (1870), Mahapurushona Charitra (1870), Mahabharatano Sar (1870), Ramayanano Sar (1870), Sarshakuntal (1881), Bhagvadgitanu Bhashantar (1882) are his prose works. His other writings between 1850 and 1865 collected in Narmagadya (1865) and posthumously published Narmagadya-2 (1936) are his other prose works. Mari Hakikat, his autobiography written in 1866 and published posthumously in 1933, is the first autobiography of Gujarati. Uttar Narmad Charitra (1939) was also published chronicling his later life.

His essays are collected and edited in three volumes. They are Narmadgadya or Narmadashankar Lalashankarna Gadyatmak Granthono Sangrah (1875) edited by Mahipatram Rupram Nilkanth, Narmadnu Mandir-Gadya Vibhag (1937) edited by Vishwanath Bhatt and Narmadgadya(1975) edited by Gambhirsinh Gohil. His fifteen prose were collected in Junu Narmadgadya Part I, II (1865, 1874) are also important.

He had researched and edited several works. Manohar Swami's Manhar Pad (1860), Narmakosh: Issue 1 (1861), Narmakosh: Issue 2 (1862), Narmakosh:Issue 3 (1864), Narmakosh:Issue 4 (1865). Narmakathakosh (1870), Dayaramkrut Kavyasangrah (1865), Stree Geet Sangrah (1870) of songs popular in Nagar Brahmin ladies, Premanand's Dashamskandh (1872) and the complete issue of Narmakosh (1873) are his edited and researched works.

Tusli Vaidhvyachitra (dialogue, 1859), Rmjanaki Darshan (1876), Draupadidarshan (1878), Balkrishnavijay (1886), Krishnakumari are his plays and dialogues. His Seetaharan (1878) is unpublished play. Rajyarang Part I, II (1874, 1876) are his works on ancient and modern history of world. Dharmavichar is his work on philosophy. Gujarat Sarvasangrah (1887) and Kathiawar Sarvasangrah (1887) are his historical works.

Mari Hakikat, his autobiography written in 1866 and published posthumously in 1933, is the first autobiography of Gujarati. His some notes and letters were published as Uttar Narmad Charitra (1939).

== List of works ==
The list is as follows:

| No. | Year of Publication | Name of the Publication |
|---|---|---|
| 1 | 1850 - 51 | Mandaii Malvathi Thata Labh |
| 2 | 1856 | Vyabhichar Nishedhak |
| 3 | 1856 | Muvan Pachhvade Rova Kutvani Ghelai |
| 4 | 1856 | Swadeshabhiman |
| 5 | 1856 | Nirashrit Pratye Shreemantna Dharma |
| 6 | 1857 | Pingal Pravesh |
| 7 | 1857 | Streena Dharma |
| 8 | 1857 | Guru ane Stree |
| 9 | 1858 | Narmakavita - 1, 2 |
| 10 | 1858 | Alamkar Pravesh |
| 11 | 1858 | Rasa Pravesh |
| 12 | 1858 | Garibai Vishe Bhikharidasno Samvad |
| 13 | 1858 | Kavi ane Kavita |
| 14 | 1859 | Samp |
| 15 | 1859 | Vishayi Guru |
| 16 | 1859 | Guruni Satta |
| 17 | 1859 | Narmakavita - 3, 4, 5, 6, 7, 8 |
| 18 | 1860 | Narmakavita - 9, 10 |
| 19 | 1860 | Dayaramkrut Kavyasamgrah |
| 20 | 1860 | Punarvivah |
| 21 | 1860 | Lagna tatha Punariagna |
| 22 | 1860 | Bhakti |
| 23 | 1860 | Sakar |
| 24 | 1860 | Manhar Pad (Manohar Swaminan Pad) |
| 25 | 1859 - 63 | Tulji Vaidhvya Chitra (In the form of a dialogue) |
| 26 | 1861 | Narma Kosh - I |
| 27 | 1861 | Rituvaman |
| 28 | 1862 | Narmakavita - Book 1 (Collection of Poems for the last seven years) |
| 29 | 1862 | Narma Kosh - 2 |
| 30 | 1863 | Narmakavita - Book - 2 |
| 31 | 1864 | Hinduoni Padti |
| 32 | 1864 | Narmakavita (Comprehensive volume) |
| 33 | 1864 | Dandio (The journal was started) |
| 34 | 1864 | Narma Kosh - 3 |
| 35 | 1864 | Ranman Pachhan Pagian Na Karva Vishe |
| 36 | 1865 | Narmagadya |
| 37 | 1865 | Kavicharitra |
| 38 | 1865 | Dayaramkrut Kavya Samgrah |
| 39 | 1865 | Narma Vyakaran Vol. I |
| 40 | 1865 | Suratni Mukhtesar Hakikat |
| 41 | 1865 | Narma Vyakaran Vol. 2. Part 1 |
| 42 | 1865 | Narrna Kosh - 4 |
| 43 | 1866 | Nayika Vishay Pravesh |
| 44 | 1867 | Mevadni Hakikat |
| 45 | 1868 | Sajivaropan |
| 46 | 1868 | Stree Kelavni |
| 47 | 1868-69 | Gujarationi Sthiti |
| 48 | 1869 | Kelavni Vishe |
| 49 | 1869 | Kul Motap |
| 50 | 1869 | Udyog tatha Vruddhi |
| 51 | 1869 | Sukh |
| 52 | 1870 | Ramayanno Sar |
| 53 | 1870 | Mahabharatno Sar |
| 54 | 1870 | Diadno Sar |
| 55 | 1870 | Narma Kathakosh |
| 56 | 1870 | Narma Kathakosh |
| 57 | 1870 | Nagar Streeoman Gavatan Geet |
| 58 | 1872 | Premanandkrut Dasham Skandh |
| 59 | 1873 | Narma Kosh (Complete) |
| 60 | 1874 | Mahadarshan (Jagatna Pracheen Itihasnun Samagra Darshan) |
| 61 | 1874 | Rajyarang -1 (Jagatna Pracheen tatha Arvacheen Itihas) |
| 62 | 1875 | Premanandkrut Nalakhyan |
| 63 | 1876 | Ram Janaki Darshan |
| 64 | 1878 | Shree Draupadi Darshan Natak |
| 65 | 1878 | Seetaharan Natak (Unpublished) |
| 66 | 1881 | Shree Sarshakuntal |
| 67 | 1886 | Balkrishna Vijay Natak* |
| 68 | 1886 | Dharma Vichar |
| 69 | 1889 | Kathiawad Sarva Sangrah (posthumous) |
| 70 | | Rajyarang - Vol. 2 |
| 71 | | Arya Darshan |
| 72 | | Krishna Kumari Natak |
| 73 | | Shreemad Bhagvad Geeta |
| 74 | 1887 | Gujarat Sarva Samgrah (posthumous) |
| 75 | 1911 | Desh Vyavahar Vyavastha |
| 76 | 1933 | Mari Hakikat (completed in 1866) |

== Works about Narmadashankar Dave ==
The list of works published about Narmad:

| No. | Title | Author | Publisher |
|---|---|---|---|
| 1 | Kavijivan | Navalram Pandya | |
| 2 | Veer Narmad | Vishwanath Bhatt | |
| 3 | Narmad Shatabdi Granth | | Mumbai Narmad Shatabdi Samiti |
| 4 | Kavi Narmad Shatabdi Smarak Chitravali | | Gujarati Sahitya Parishad |
| 5 | Narmad: Arvachinoma Adya | K. M. Munshi | |
| 6 | Narmadashankar Kavi | Ramnarayan V. Pathak | |
| 7 | Narmad: Arvachin Gadya Padyano Adya Praneta | Ramnarayan V. Pathak | |
| 8 | Navyugno Prahari: Narmad | Bhogilal Gandhi | |
| 9 | Narmadashankar (in English) | Gulabdas Broker | |
| 10 | Narmad: Ek Character (Humorous sketch of Narmad) | Vinod Bhatt | |
| 11 | Society and Literature: Narmad in Critical Discourse | Rakesh Desai (ed.) | |

== Adaptation ==
Narmad:Mari Hakikat or Narmad:My Life, a soliloquy based on his autobiography and life, was written and directed by Harish Trivedi while it was performed by Chandrakant Shah. It was premiered in Dayton, Ohio, US in 1995 and later toured India, UK, France. It was critically acclaimed.
