= Kusumamala =

1887 collection of poems by Narsinhrao Divetia

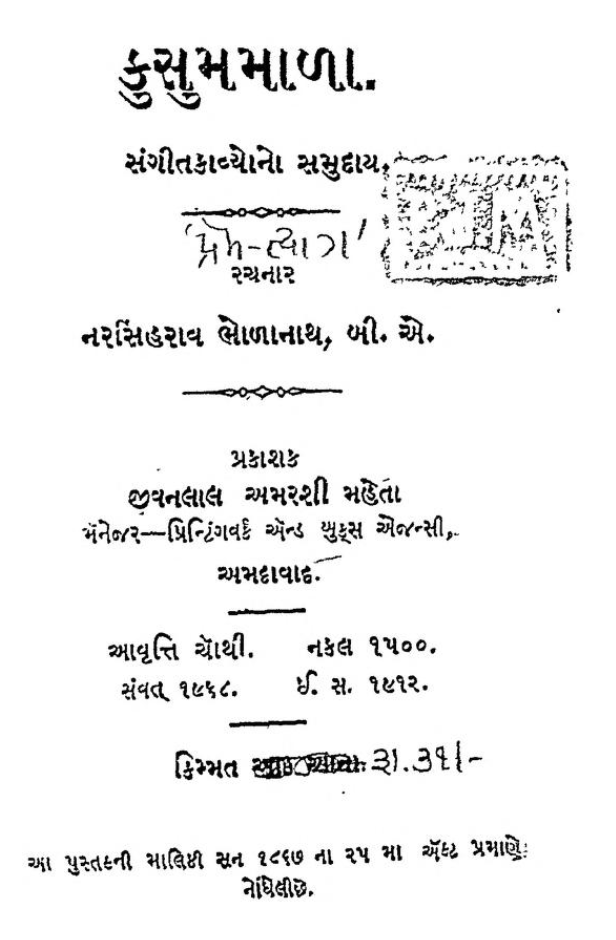
- Title page of 4th edition, 1912
- Author: Narsinhrao Divetia
- Original title: કુસુમમાળા
- Language: Gujarati
- Subject: Love, nature
- Genre: Lyric poetry
- Publication date: 1887
- Publication place: India
- OCLC: 33236882
- Dewey Decimal: 891.471
- LC Class: PK1859.D57 K8 1953
- Original text: કુસુમમાળા at Gujarati Wikisource

Kusumamala (transl. Garland of Flowers) is a collection of poems by Gujarati writer Narsinhrao Divetia published in 1887. It is considered Divetia's magnum opus and a milestone in the history of modern Gujarati poetry. The poems were written in the manner of English lyrical poetry. The work was well received by the new school writers while criticised by old school writers.

== Origin ==
Divetia was interested in and influenced by English romantic poetry, especially the work of William Wordsworth. He therefore wrote lyrics in the pattern of English lyrical poetry compiled in the Palgrave's Golden Treasury. In the introduction to Kusumamala, Divetia wrote:

I have published the collection of these short lyrics with the highest aim to introduce to the Gujarati readers the method of compositions of the western poetry which is different from that adopted in our country; I do this not by dry critical discussion, but by examples, in order to draw their attention towards that poetry and to show what the true poetry is...

— Narsinhrao Divetia, 1887

== Content ==
The Kusumamala contains 62 poems on various subjects, including love, nature, social conditions, and historical places and events. The poems are written in various metres as well as in traditional and folk melodies and rhythms. The collection includes short and long poems, with some having nearly one hundred lines. The shortest poem is "Mangalacharan" ("The Auspicious Stanza"), which consists of just four lines, while the longest poem is "Chanda" ("The Moon"), consisting of 112 lines which are divided into 28 stanzas of four lines each. Some other long poems are "Asthir Ane Sthir Prem" ("Unsteady and Steady Love") (68 lines), "Vidhvano Vilap" ("The Lamentation of the Widow") (96 lines), and "Megh", a translation of "The Cloud" by English poet Percy Bysshe Shelley (92 lines).

== Reception ==
The Kusumamala was well received by readers. Its first edition was published in 1887, followed by a second edition in 1902, third edition in 1907, and fourth edition in 1912.

The Kusumamala was received positively by the new or Western school writers but negatively by the old or orthodox school writers. Navalram Pandya's review was very short and terse. He found the verses, modelled as they were on those of Shelley and Wordsworth, were intended to give an idea to the Gujarati reader as to the sort of poetry the West produced. He praised the poems as being delightful and on the whole easy to understand, although the language and style were cultured (fully developed). Kusumamala received negative criticism from Manilal Nabhubhai Dwivedi, who called it "foreign exotic flowers, bright coloured but without beauty or fragrance, nothing better than a garland of flowers skilfully woven in obedience to the alluring vogue then prevalent of considering everything coming from the West worthy of imitation". Dwivedi criticised the collection for months in the Priyamavada and Sudarshana magazines which he edited, arousing controversy. Ramanbhai Neelkanth responded with a series of articles in Jnan Sudha. He contested Dwivedi's criticism and hailed the collection as "an oasis in the desert of Gujarati poetic literature".

Manishankar Bhatt 'Kant' and Balwantray Thakore also criticised the collection, while Anandshankar Dhruv appreciated it. Govardhanram Tripathi quoted a few lines from Chanda, a poem in Kusumamala, in his epic novel Saraswatichandra. Divetia's second poetry collection, Hridayavina, aroused similar controversy.

Kanaiyalal Maneklal Munshi, in Gujarat and Its Literature, noted that with Kusumamala, Divetia launched the age of romantic poetry in the Gujarati language.
