= Jai Jai Garavi Gujarat (song) =

Single by A. R. Rahman
- Released: 1 May 2010
- Recorded: 2010; Panchathan Record Inn and AM Studios (Chennai, India)
- Length: 5:06
- Composer: A. R. Rahman
- Lyricists: Narmad; Prasoon Joshi (Hindi)

Jai Jai Garavi Gujarat (alternately titled Gujarat Theme Song) is a Gujarati song composed by A. R. Rahman. Prasoon Joshi has written the Hindi lyrics of the song. The title line is taken from a song Jai Jai Garavi Gujarat penned by Gujarati poet Narmad. It is performed by Keerthi Sagathia and various other artists. It was composed as part of the 50th year of formation of Gujarat state.

== Background ==
Rahman was commissioned by the Gujarat government to set tune for the famous lines by the noted Gujarati poet Narmad, which were long used in many Gujarat government functions, as part of celebrations regarding the 50th year of formation of Gujarat State. Rahman composed those lines with his typical inspirational style and recorded the song with many major artists. According to Rahman, "The people of Gujarat are some of the nicest that I've come across whether in India or across the globe. Also, the fact that my wife is from Kutch, gave me additional impetus to compose this song."

== Release and reception ==
The song was released on 1 May 2010, the same date on which the Gujarat State was formed 50 years before in Sardar Patel Stadium, Ahmedabad. There was no official audio launch function and the song was made available for free download from various websites including the official site of Narendra Modi. The song received positive responses, for the comparatively mild instrumentation which indirectly helped the audience to get to the lines easily.

The song released as a single but not commercially. It was made available for digital download in 2 versions, Gujarati and Hindi languages respectively. Hence, there was an initial controversy whether the song was composed by the noted composer or not but later came the official clarifications. There was also criticisms that the song was not well used and was not given any deserved importance in the functions.

== Contributing artists ==
Lead vocals

- Keerthi Sagathia
- Sadhana Sargam

Backing vocals

- Haricharan
- Bhagyaraj
- Nithin Raj
- R. Vijay Narain
- Kalyani
- Megha
- Maya
- Rita
- Priya Panchal
- Jahnvi Shrimankar
- Upanga
- Shruti
- Shriram Iyer
- Bhavin Dhanak
- Kapil
- Sagar Kendurker
- Sachin–Jigar

== Music video ==
Music video was conceived and directed by Bharat Bala under Bharat Bala Productions.
