= List of Gujarati dictionaries =

Notable Gujarati dictionaries

The following is a list of all notable Gujarati dictionaries.

Title	Author	Date (C.E.)	Languages	Notes
Illustrations of the grammatical parts of the Guzerattee, Mahratta & English language	Dr. Robert Drummond (b. ?? - d. 1809)	1808	Gujarati-English	Mostly a glossary
Narmakoś (Gujarati: નર્મકોશ)	Narmadashankar Lalshankar Dave (Gujarati: નર્મદાશંકર લાલશંકર દવે) (b. 1833 - d. 1886)	1861	Gujarati-Gujarati	
English and Gujarati Dictionary (Gujarati: ઇંગ્રેજી તથા ગુજરાતી ન્હાનો કોશ)	Ardesar Framji, Narmad, and Nanabhai Rustomji Ranina (Gujarati: અરદેસર ફરામજી, નર્મદાશંકર લાલશંકર દવે, તથા ન્હાનાભાઈ રૂસ્તમજી રાણીના)	1862	Gujarati-English Gujarati to Gujarati Dictionary	
A Sanskrit and Gujarati Dictionary (Gujarati: સંસ્કૃત તથા ગુજરાતી કોશ)	Bajirao Tatya Raoji Ranjit (Gujarati: બાજીરાવ તાત્યા રાવજી રણજીત)	1871	Gujarati-Sanskrit	
Sārth Gujarātī Joḍaṇīkoś (Gujarati: સાર્થ ગુજરાતી જોડણીકોશ)	Gujarat Vidyapeeth (Gujarati: ગુજરાત વિદ્યાપીઠ)	1929	Gujarati-Gujarati	The first Gujarati dictionary to standardize Gujarati orthography
Pāribhāṣik Śabdakoś (Gujarati: પારિભાષિક શબ્દકોશ)	Vishwanath Bhatt (Gujarati: વિશ્વનાથ ભટ્ટ) (b. 1898 - d. 1968)	1932	Gujarati-Gujarati	
Bhagavadgomaṇḍal (Gujarati: ભગવદ્ગોમંડલ)	Maharaj Bhagvatsinhji Jadeja (Gujarati: મહારાજા ભગવતસિંહજી) (b. 1865 - d. 1944)	1940	Gujarati-Gujarati	Encyclopedia and Dictionary
Gujarātī-Marāṭhī Śabdakoś (Marathi: गुजराती-मराठी शब्दकोश)	S. G. Dharmadhikari (Marathi: धर्माधिकारी)	1971	Gujarati-Marathi	
Ekākṣarī Śabdakoś (Gujarati: એકાક્ષરી શબ્દકોશ)	Dinkar Joshi (Gujarati: દિનકર જોષી) (b. 1937 - )	2003	Gujarati-Gujarati	
