= Kavijivan =

Biographical work written by Gujarati writer Navalram Pandya (1887)

Kavijivan (pronounced [kʌvɪdʒiːvʌn]) (lit. "The Life of a Poet") is a biographical work published in 1887 about Gujarati poet and writer, Narmadashankar Dave, popularly writing under the pen name Narmad. It was written by fellow Gujarati writer and critic Navalram Pandya. Kavijivan is largely based on Narmad's own private autobiographical account, Mari Hakikat, which was published posthumously in 1933. It was the first biography of Narmad in Gujarati literature. It covers Narmad's social and literary career and provides details about his public life, but avoids discussion of his private life.

== Background ==
Before Navalram wrote Kavijvan, he reviewed two biographies: Karsandas Mulji Charitra (1878) and Mehtaji Durgaram Manchharamnu Charitra (1879), both written by Mahipatram Nilkanth. He stressed the importance of writing the biographies of great persons and discussed the standard practices for a biography. He believed that the biographies of great people inspire the common man to aspire to high ideals and noble acts, yet insisted that the biography not define its subject who should be presented as a 'human being' only. A biographer should be natural and realistic. Great persons described as supernatural are beyond the imagination of a common man and are worshiped only, not followed.

The biography was written immediately after Narmad's death, for its inclusion in the third and enlarged edition of Narmakavita, a collection of Narmad's poems. Navalram used Narmad's autobiographical Mari Hakikat, an original account written by Narmad that had not been intended for public distribution. Navalram also used Narmad's personal notes to supplement the biography, preferring to rely on Narmad's first-hand narrative rather than his own recollections. Kavijivan was the first biography about Narmad to be published in the Gujarati language.

== Contents ==
A large part of the biography is divided into three phases of Narmad's life: (1) 1850-55: period of internal struggle; (2) 1855-58: period of hectic escorts; (3) 1858-59-65, 66: period of complete glory.

In the first phase, the author narrates the ambition of Narmad to be famous, his passion for women, his first unsuccessful marriage, passion for love and heroism, diligence in establishing associations for social, religious and literary deliberations.

In the second phase he gives a detailed account of his efforts in self-study and attempts to display outstanding merits.

In the last phase, he narrates the poet's poetic rivalry with Dalpatram, and its positive and negative effects; uninterrupted publications of his poems and the impact of his poetry on society and literature; his scholarship, evident in essays on literary, social, historical, economic and other subjects; his laying down the foundation of modern Gujarati prose by his unique style; his daring journalism in Dandiyo and his satirical and scathing articles; and his single-handed compilation of the first dictionary (Narmakosh) in Gujarati, providing the infrastructure for subsequent similar facts of his Individual as well as scholarly activities in context with the renaissance.

== Criticism ==
Dhirubhai Thaker wrote: "It is a mature attempt to evaluate Narmad's social and literary career. Navalram's critical faculty is at its best in this monograph as he judiciously analyses the poet's mind and justifies the metamorphosis of his views on social reform." Chadrakant Mehta reviewed the biography: "The biographer has given authentic information and analysed the factors responsible for the creative evolution of Narmad. The author has taken a broad perspective and has plunged deep into the psyche of the poet while analysing the working of the mind of Narmad". Ramesh Shukla criticized the biography and wrote: "While discussing his (Narmad's) personal life, knowing fully well about his extra-marital affairs he (Navalram) gives a clean chit to the poet, arguing, that after settling at Surat, he had never looked at any woman. Navalram defended Narmad when he took a second wife, a widow. He considered it more 'dignified' than those who carry on their affairs secretly. Narmad’s wife, Dahigauri, was mentally tortured and compelled to give her consent to this 'dignified' act. Navalram ignores this episode. Further, he also maintains silence on another event, in which, the poet gave shelter to another widow, Savitagauri, but without marrying her."
