= Narma Gadya =

Book in Gujarati by Narmadashankar Dave (1876)

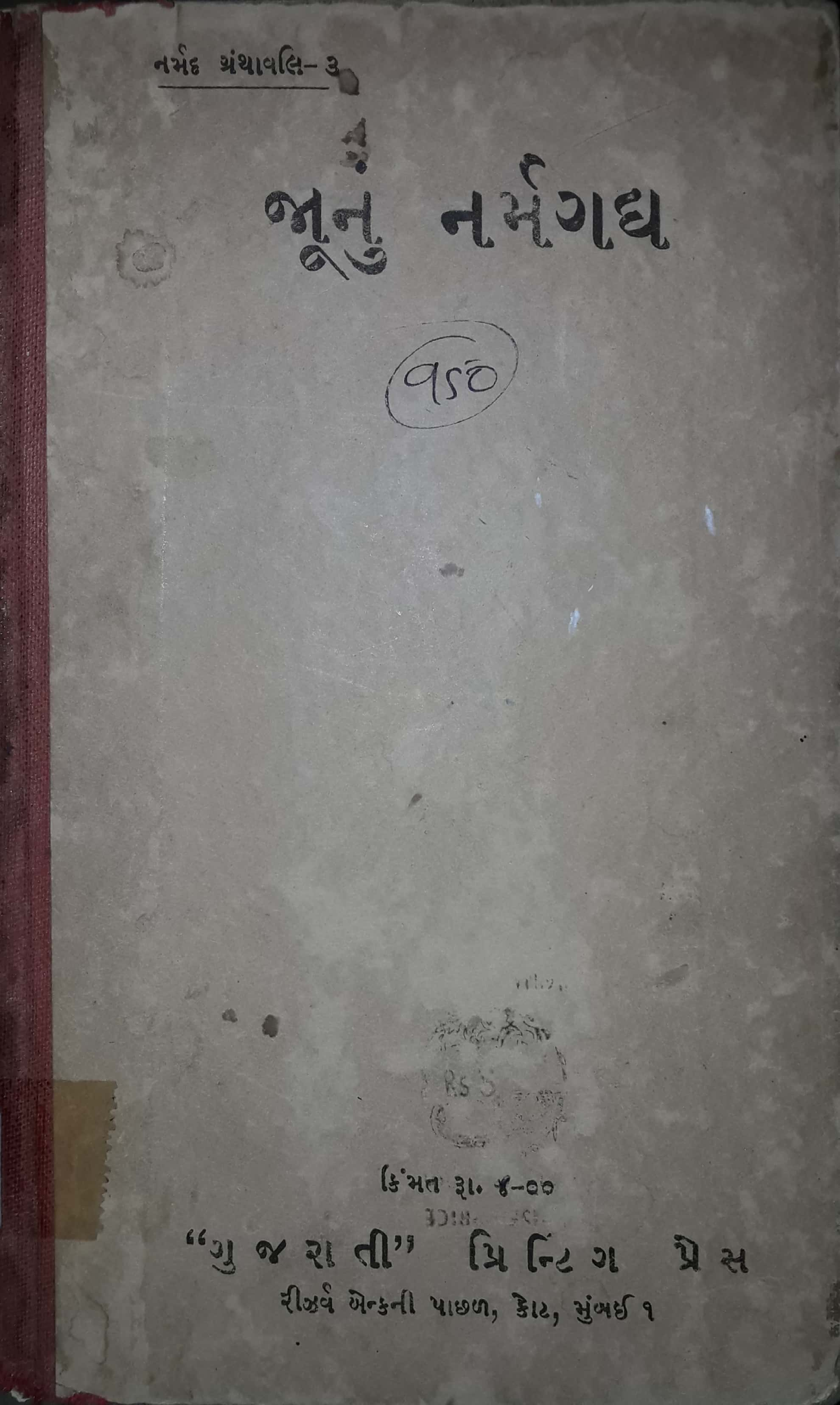
Cover page of old Narma Gadya

Narma Gadya (pronounced [nər.mə.gə.dyə]) (lit. Narmad's prose) is a collection of the prose writings of Gujarati writer Narmadashankar Dave (1833–1886), popularly known by his pen-name, Narmad. It was first published in 1865, and a heavily edited version was published without the author's permission in 1875 as a set text for schools. The original publication of the earlier of the essays contained in the book introduced the Narmad Era of Gujarati literature.

== Overview ==
Narmadashankar Dave (1833–1886), popularly known by his pen-name, Narmad, was a Gujarati language writer. He was the first Gujarati writer who had had an English education. Through his writing he brought the literature of the west to readers of Gujarati. He heralded a new era in Gujarati literature, known as the Narmad Era. Narmad's first article, written in 1853, was an essay entitled "Mandali Malvathi Thata Labh" (English: "Advantages of Forming an Assembly"). Before 1856 he worked as an editor of Buddivardhak Granth (lit. A Book of Knowledge), a Gujarati monthly magazine published by Buddhivardhak Sabha, and wrote articles on various subjects of contemporary interest. In 1864, he started his own magazine called Dandio (lit. Drumstick), again writing many articles himself.

== Publication history ==
In 1865, Narmad published the first edition of Narma Gadya with his photograph on the first page. In the introduction of the book he wrote:

This collection of my writing I have published for my own sake. If the people want to take advantage of it they can. I must readily have on my table my writing in different genres, published in different periodicals. The writings are the powerful overflow of passion; scholars are requested to consider them as turbid water of the monsoon. After some years of course (if published after making some changes) the thoughts expressed might became clean like the water of autumn

— Narmad

In 1866, he published Suratni Mukhtesar Hakikat (English: A Brief History of Surat), a sociopolitical history of his hometown Surat. He referred to the book as Narma Gadya Book II, Part I. In the same year he published his autobiography Mari Hakikat (English: My History) which he referred to as Narma Gadya Book II, Part II, in an edition of about five copies. These two books are considered to be integral parts of Narma Gadya. The history of Surat was included in the new edition, while Mari Hakikat was published under the same name.

== Contents ==
The first book is divided into six parts. The first part consist of essays written on different subjects ranging from war ethics to the principles of literary criticism. In the second part there are two dialogues on social problems. The third part consists of his writings on various contemporary subjects, whereas the fourth consists of his serious writing on different subjects published in Buddhivardhak Granth. In the fifth there is a selection of his writings from his periodical Dandio, which are full of wit, humour, and satire, and in the sixth there are thirteen character sketches of medieval Gujarati poets.

Most of the essays from these volumes are written in lecture-style; hence, sometimes, they are directly addressed to the local people.

== Further editions ==
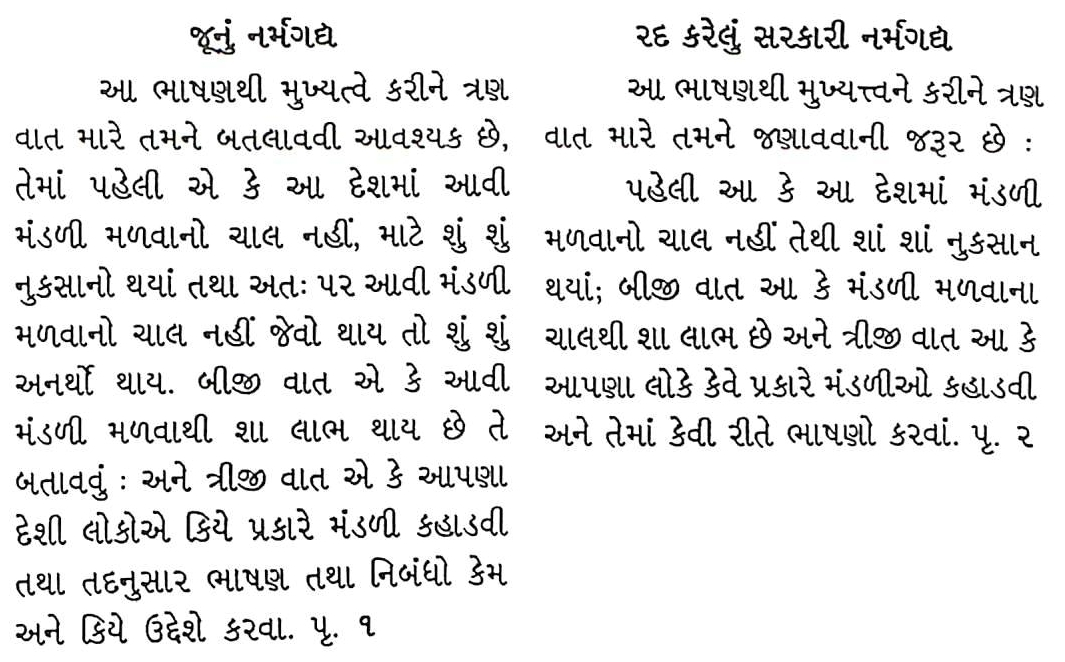
Difference between old Narmagadya and government Narmagadya

The government decided to prescribe Narma Gadya as a text book for schools. In 1874, the Gujarati education department requested Narmad to prepare a school edition of Narma Gadya. Accordingly Narmad revised the book, made some changes and published two thousand copies of the revised edition in 1874. This edition was named Sarkari Narma Gadya (lit. Government Narma Gadya). However, a newly appointed head of the education department found some of the articles unsuitable for teaching in school and had all of these books destroyed. He asked for Narmad's opinion on further revising the book but did not receive a reply, and the work was entrusted to the department's Gujarati translator, Mahipatram Nilkanth. After making numerous changes, including deleting some sections, Mahipatram prepared a new edition which was published by the government in 1875.

The revised edition and its interpretation caused a prolonged controversy about its authenticity. The debate about it continued until 1912, when Gujarati Printing Press republished the original edition of Narma Gadya. In 1974, Premananda Sahitya Sabha of Vadodara reprinted the 1874 edition of Narma Gadya, which had been revised by Narmad. Thus all the three editions of the book, the original edition from 1865, the revised edition of 1874, and the government edition of 1875, are available.

== Reception ==
Navalram Pandya, a close associate of Narmad, praised the balanced writing style and the diction of the author's prose. He described it as simple, mature and dear equally to the educated and uneducated reader. The first essay, Mandali Malvathi Thata Labh, is regarded as a landmark in Gujarati literature by several scholars.
