= Kukasvada =

Village in Gujarat

- Village
- Nickname: Bhikha Bapa Dham
- Motto: Jai Jai Garavi Gujarat
- Anthem: Jana Gana Mana
- Country: India
- State: Gujarat
- Region: Saurashtra
- District: Junagadh
- Tehsil: Matia Taluq
- Sarpanch: Sudhirbhai Parmar (Congress party)

Government
  - Type: Gram Panchayat
  - Body: Sarpanch
  - Sarpanch: Sudhirbhai Parmar (INC party)
  - MLA: Babubhai Kalabhai Vaja

Population (2011)
  - Total: 8,000+
- Time zone: UTC+5:30 (IST)
- STD code: 02870
- Pin code: 362250

Kukasvada also sometimes spelled Kukaswada is a village in Malia tehsil of Junagadh district in Gujarat state of India. Kukasvada is the birthplace of Dhirubhai Ambani and his close friend Bhikhabhai Bhadaraka known as Bhikha Bapa.

== Education ==
=== College ===
- Shri Karmyogi Arts And Comm. college Gadu

=== Schools ===
- Sharda Pra Shala Pvt
- Vivekanand Pra Shala Pvt
- Kukasvada Kanya Shala
- Dholivav Sim Shala
- Kukasvada Pay Cen Shala

== Health centre ==
- C.M.Z.H. Junagardh, Civil Hospital, near Azad Chowk
- Sargavada, Subcenter Saragwada, near bus station Saragwada
- Sub Center Balapur

== Religious places ==
- Bhikha Bapa temple, Kukasvada
- Jay Charan Ma Jay Khimbbapa temple kukasvada
- Jay Bhavani Maa Temple Kukasvada
- Ramapir Temple, Gotana
- Bajrag Bali Temple, Gotana
