= Gujarati literature =

Literature in the Gujarati language of India

The history of Gujarati literature (Gujarati: ગુજરાતી સાહિત્ય, romanized: Gujarātī sāhitya) may be traced to 1000 AD, and this literature has flourished since then to the present. It is unique in having almost no patronage from a ruling dynasty, other than its composers.

Gujarat Vidhya Sabha, Gujarat Sahitya Sabha, Gujarat Sahitya Akademi and Gujarati Sahitya Parishad are Gujarat-based literary institutions promoting the Gujarati literature.

== History ==
Such factors as the policies of the rulers, the living style of the people, and the worldwide influence on society are important for any literature to flourish. In Gujarat, due to the development of trade and commerce, the religious influence of Jainism as well as Hinduism, and also due to the safety and encouragement of rulers like Chaulukya (Solanki) and Vaghela Rajputs, literary activities were in full force from the 11th century.

- Gujarati literature
  - Early literature (up to 1450 AD)
    - Prāg-Narsinh Yug (1000 AD to 1450 AD)
      - Rāsa Yug
  - Medieval literature (1450 AD – 1850 AD)
    - Narsinh Yug (1450 AD to 1850 AD)
      - Bhakti Yug
        - Saguṇ Bhakti Yug
        - Nirguṇ Bhakti Yug
  - Modern literature (1850 AD to date)
    - Sudhārak Yug or Narmad Yug (1850–1885 AD)
    - Paṇḍit Yug or Govardhan Yug (1885–1915 AD)
    - Gandhi Yug (1915–1945 AD)
    - Anu-Ghandhi Yug (1940–1955 AD)
    - Ādhunik Yug (1955–1985 AD)
    - Anu-Ādhunik Yug (1985 – to date)

Literature in Gujarati is sometimes also classified into two broad categories, namely poetry and prose, the former savouring and basking in its long lineage, dating back to the 6th century. Poetry as a perception was a medium for expressing religious beliefs and judgements, a stronghold of medieval Indian times. In this context of gradual evolution, the history of Gujarati literature is generally classed into three broad periods, consisting of the Early period (up to c. 1450 AD), the Middle period (1450 to 1850 AD) and the Modern period (1850 AD. onwards). However, Gujarati literature and its tremendous maturation and proficiency in contributing to culture is retraced back to Gujarat Sultanate days (referring to the Muzaffarid dynasty, which had provided the sultans of Gujarat in western India from 1391 to 1583).

Gujarati literature is divided mainly into three eras or Yugas; the early, medieval and modern, with these eras being further subdivided.

The early era (up to 1450 AD) and medieval era (1450 AD – 1850 AD) are divided into 'before Narsinh' and 'after Narsinh' periods sometimes. Some scholars divide this period as 'Rāsa yug', 'Saguṇ Bhakti yug' and 'Nirguṇ Bhakti yug' also.

The modern era (1850 AD to date) is divided into 'Sudhārak Yug' or 'Narmad Yug', 'Paṇḍit Yug' or 'Govardhan Yug', 'Gandhi Yug', 'Anu-Gandhi Yug', 'Ādhunik Yug' and 'Anu-Ādhunik Yug'.

=== Early literature ===
==== Pre-Narsinh Era (1000 AD to 1450 AD) ====
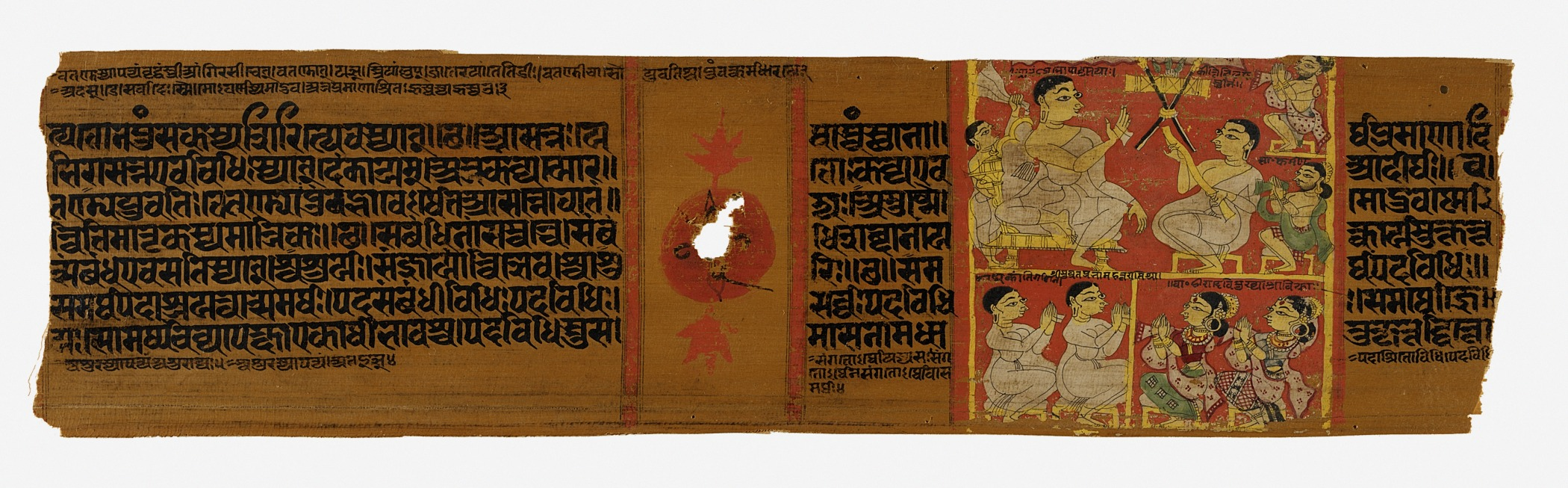
Instruction by Monks, Folio from the manuscript of Siddhahaimashabdanushasana by Hemachandra (1089–1172)

The Jain monk and scholar Hemacandrācārya Suri was one of the earliest scholars of Prakrit and Apabhramsha grammars. He had penned a formal set of 'grammarian principles' as the harbinger of the Gujarati language during the reign of the Chaulukya king Jayasimha Siddharaja of Anhilwara. This treatise formed the cornerstone of Apabhramsa grammar in the Gujarati language, establishing a language from a combination of forms of languages like Sanskrit and Ardhamagadhi. He authored Kavyanushasana (Poetics), a handbook or manual of poetry, Siddha-haima-shabdanushasana on Prakrit and Apabhramsha grammars, and Desinamamala, a list of words of local origin.

It is generally accepted by historians and researchers in literary genres in Gujarati literature that the earliest writings in this very ancient language were by Jaina authors. These were composed in the form of Rāsas, Phāgus and Vilāsas. Rāsas were long poems which were essentially heroic, romantic or narrative in nature. Śālībhadra Sūri's Bharateśvara Bāhubalī rāsa (1185 AD), Vijayasena's Revantagiri-rāsa (1235 AD), Ambadeva's Samararasa (1315 AD) and Vinayaprabha's Gautama Svāmi rāsa (1356 AD) are the most illustrious examples of this form of literature in Gujarati. The chief subjects of Rasas were descriptions of nature, depictions of seasons, Jain Acharyas and Tirthankaras, and biographies of historic characters. The collections of these Rasas are currently preserved in Jain libraries of Patan, Ahmedabad, Jaisalmer and Khambhat.

The phāgus are poems that pictured the blissful and cheery nature of the spring festival (Vasanta). They were written by Jain monks but are not centred on religion. Rājasekhara's Neminatha-phagu (1344 AD) and unknown poet's Vasanta-vilāsa (1350 AD) are instances of such texts. Vasantavilasa had 84 stanzas and is similar to a phagu of the same name so it is possible that both are written by the same person.

Other notable prabandha or narrative poems of this period include Śrīdhara's Raṇamalla Chhanda (1398 AD), Merutunga's Prabandhachintamani, Padmanābha's Kānhaḍade Prabandha (1456 AD) and Bhīma's Sadayavatsa Kathā (1410 AD). Neminātha Chatuṣpadika (1140 AD) by Vinayacandra is the oldest of the bāramāsi genre of Gujarati poems.

Among non-Jain writers of the time, Asait Thakar is considered as a major contributor who wrote around 360 vesha (lit. dress) of Bhavai. He is credited with bringing theatre to the Gujarati literature. Abdur Raheman, who wrote Sandeshkarash, is considered as the first Muslim writer of Gujarati literature.

There are some prose works in grammar, bhashya and religion. The earliest work in Gujarati prose was Taruṇaprabha's Balavabodha (1355 AD) which is religious work. Prithvichandra Charita (1422 AD) of Manikyasundara, which essentially served as a religious romance, is the most paramount illustration of old Gujarati prose and is reminiscent of Bāṇabhaṭṭa's Kadambari. Somasundara (1374) and Mugdhavbodha Auktika are other notable prose works.

Due to flourishing trade and commerce in Ahmedabad and Khambat (Cambay), entertainment activities started to develop, and the Jain saints, story-tellers, puppet shows, and Bhavai (dramas) also revived literature.

=== Medieval literature ===
During this period, the poetry dominated the literary activities. As Rasas written by Jain monks were a type of narrative poetry, Akhyanas are considered as their literary descendants which reached their glory in this period. Garbo and Garbi poetry associated with dance were developed as well as phagu and Barmasi genres depicting seasons. The types of pada: prabhatiya, dhol, kafi and chabkha were created. So the singable poetry, a tradition inherited from Apabhramsa, developed and dominated in the period.

==== Narsinh Era (1450 AD – 1850 AD) ====
During the 15th century, Gujarati literature had come under the tremendous sway of the Bhakti movement, a popular cultural movement to liberate religion from entrenched priesthood. Narsinh Mehta (15th century) was the foremost poet of this era. His poems delineated a very saintly and mystical sense and bore an intense reflection of the philosophy of Advaita. Narsinh Mehta's Govind Gaman, Surat Sangram, Sudama Charitra and Sringaramala are illustrations of this devotional poetry. Due to his poetic style, the works of contemporary and early poets were obscured.

===== Bhakti Era (15th–19th century) =====
During this age, Jain and Hindu poets produced Gujarat literature in abundance. The prose and poetry created were aimed to encourage religion and worship. Hindu texts such as Gita, Mahabharata, Vedas, and Bhagwata became popular. There were also creations of prayers, Jain history, etc. During this period of the influence of the Bhakti Movement on Gujarati literature, the Ramayana, the Bhagavad Gita, the Yogavashistha and the Panchatantra were all translated into Gujarati. This period also experienced the colossal Puranic revival, which led to the rapid growth and maturation of devotional poetry in Gujarati literature. This era is divided into two traditions, Sagun Bhakti tradition and Nirgun Bhakti tradition.

Sagun Bhakti tradition

In this tradition, the God is worshiped in physical form, having some form and virtues like Rama and Krishna. Narsinh Mehta, Meera, and Dayaram were foremost contributors of this tradition. Bhalan (1434–1514 AD) had furnished a meritorious representation of Bāṇabhaṭṭa's Kadambari into Gujarati. Bhalana composed other fourteen or fifteen works such as Dasham Skandha, Nalakhyan, Ramabal Charitra and Chandi Akhyana. Bhalan is known for his akhyana-style and is considered a person who introduced it to Gujarati literature.

Meera supplied many Pada (Verse). Premanand Bhatt was a prolific poet and there is much folklore about him. He is credited with writing 47 works but scholars accredit only 27 works to him. He chiefly authored works on Narsinh Mehta, Bhagvat and Mahabharata. His notable works are Okha Harana, Nalakhyan, Abhimanyu Akhyana, Dasham Skandha and Sudama Charitra.

Shamal Bhatt was an extremely creative and productive poet who gave birth to unforgettable works like Padmavati, Batris Putli, Nanda Batrisi, Sinhasan Batrisi and Madana Mohan in Gujarati verse writing. His works also depict strong female characters compared to contemporary works for the first time in Gujarati literature. Dayaram (1767–1852) had given rise to religious, ethical and romantic lyrics referred to as Garbi. His most authoritative works comprise Bhakti Poshan, Rasik Vallabh and Ajamel Akhyan. His death is considered as the end of medieval period of Gujarati literature. The "Ramayana" was authored by Giridhara in Gujarati during the middle of the 19th century. Parmanand, Brahmanand, Vallabha, Haridas, Ranchhod and Divali Bai were other authoritative 'saint poets' from this period of poetry predomination in Gujarati literature.

Nirgun Bhakti tradition

The God has no physical form in this tradition.

Narsinh Mehta and Akho were the foremost contributors of this tradition. His works depict contemporary society, philosophy, behaviour and humour. Akho's Akhe Gita, Chittavichar Samvad and Anubhav Bindu have always been illustrated as being emphatic compositions on the Vedanta. Yet another poet, Mandana, had authored works like Prabodha Battrisi, Ramayan and Rupmangal Katha. Other contributors are Kabir-Panthi poets, Dhira Bhagat, Bhoja Bhagat, Bapusaheb Gaikwad, and Pritam.

===== Others =====
Poets from the Swaminarayan sect such as Brahmanand Swami, Premanand Swami and Nishkulanand Swami also contributed immensely. Their works were focused on morality, devotion and reclusion. Parsi poets also entered Gujarati literature during this period. Their notable works are translation of Parsi religious literature in Gujarati. Eravad Rustom Peshot is considered as the first Parsi Gujarati poet who wrote biographies such as Zarthost-nameh, Siyavaksha-nameh, Viraf-nameh and Aspandiar-nameh.

=== Modern literature (1850 AD – present) ===
With the colonial British Government and the new technology of printing and press, education in the English language began. The new age brought many newspapers and magazines, which spread awareness in society. Because of this, there was much more literature, and it included forms other than the ancient religious style of poetry. The creations reflect social welfare, criticism, plays, new-age thinking, worship of the country, the values of life, etc. This period is subdivided into following eras: Reformist Era or Narmad Era, Scholar Era or Govardhan Era, Gandhi Era, Post-Gandhi Era, Modern Era and Postmodern Era.

==== Reformist Era or Narmad Era (1850–1885 AD) ====
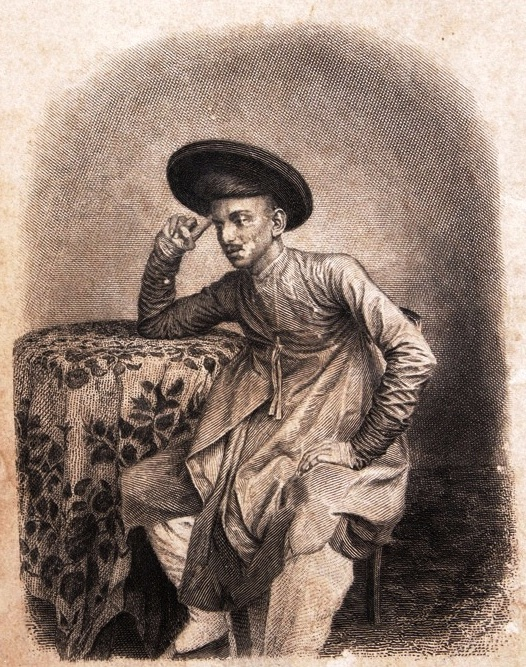
Narmad

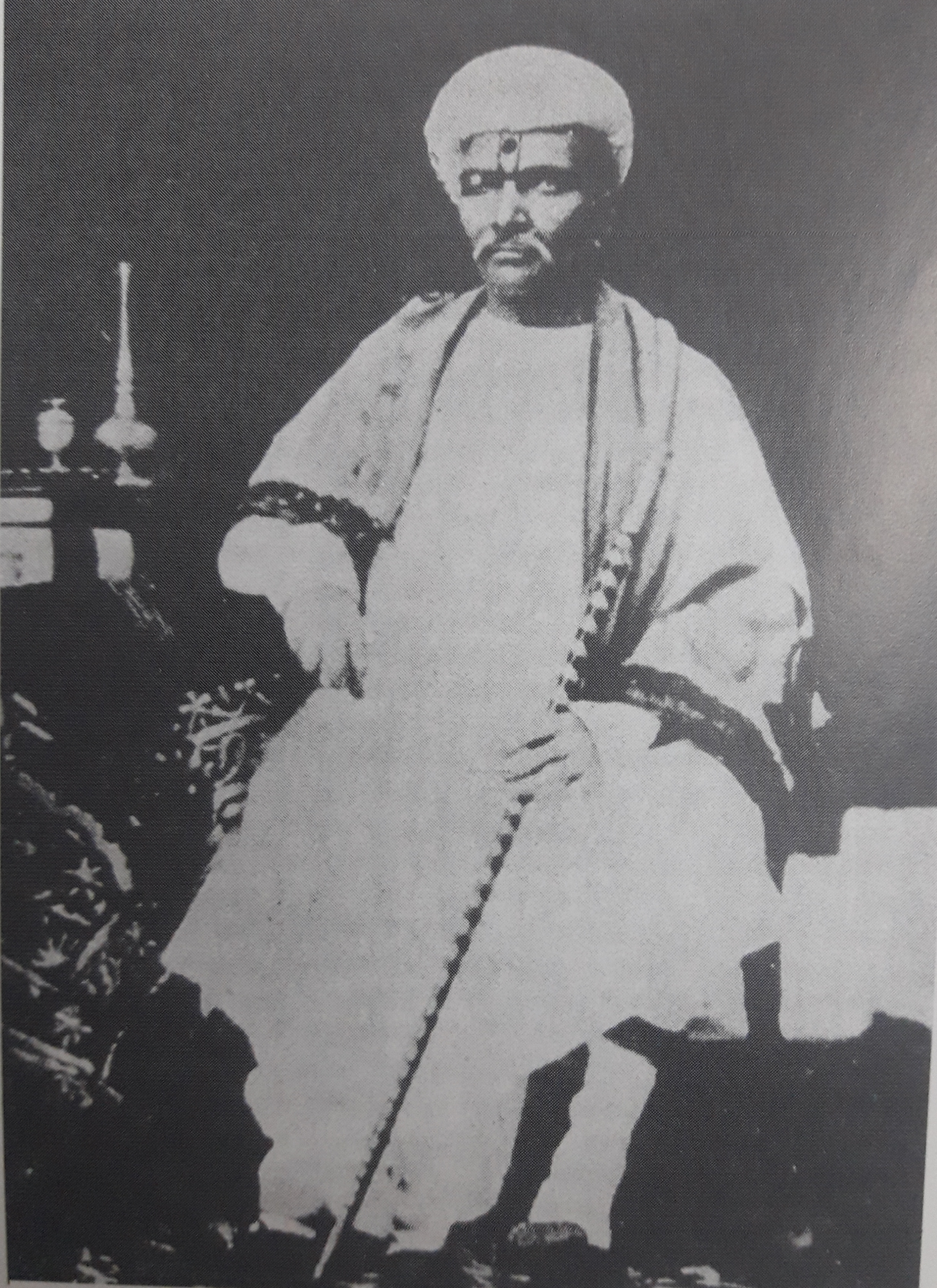
Dalpatram

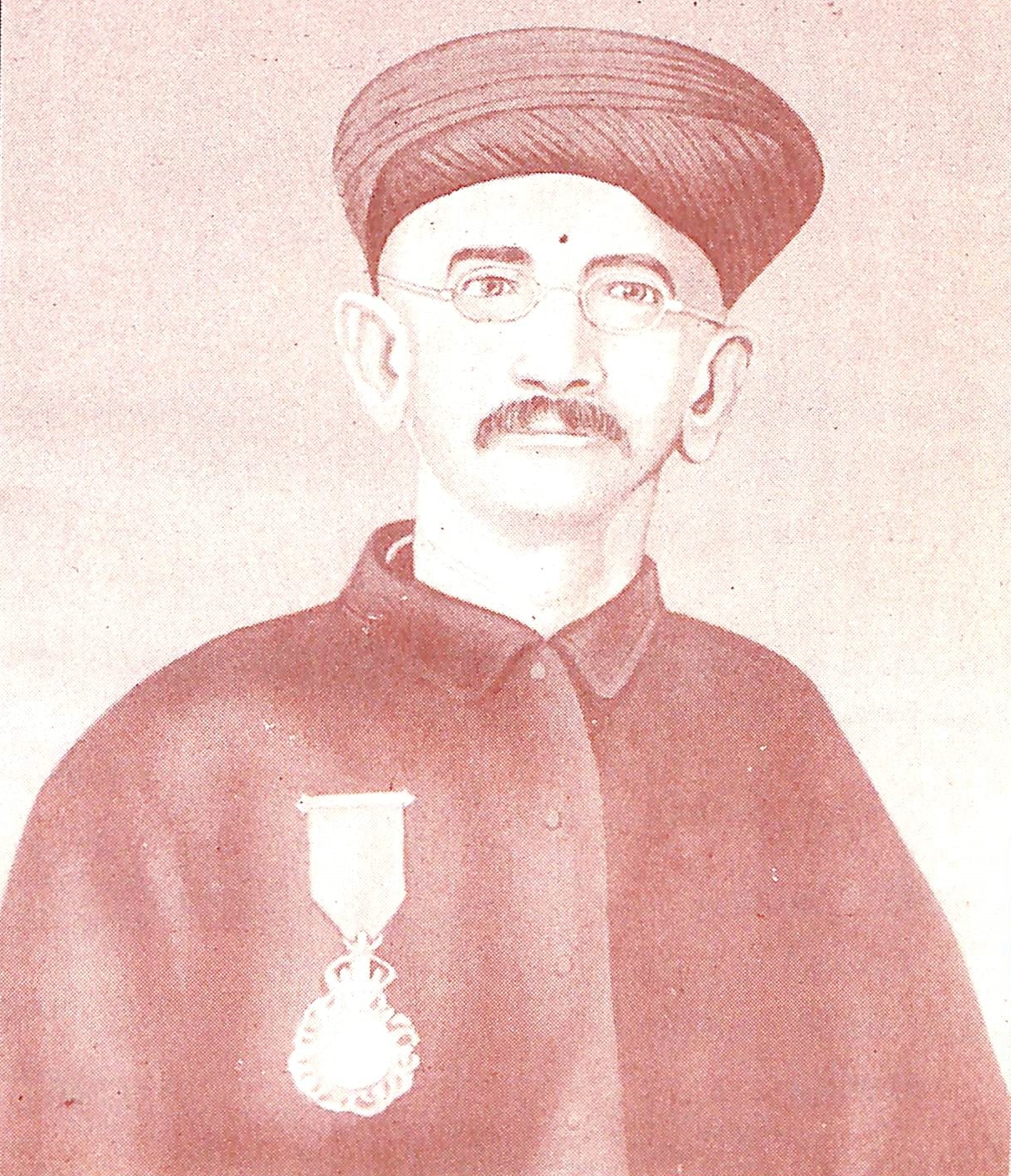
Mahipatram Nilkanth

Writers of Reformist era

From the middle of 19th century, Gujarati, like other regional Indian languages, came under strong western influence, precisely due to colonial residence and colonial reign. Western education and culture started to influence local culture and the awareness was spread about pervasive customs of Hindu society. Two sections in society emerged: conservative following traditional customs as a cultural duty and liberal which believed in opposition and end of social pervasive customs and injustice So Prarthana Samaj, Arya Samaj, Theosophical Society were established which wanted to reform society through religion while other reformers believed in non-religious way of reform. Social reform was a central subjects in works of this era. Narmad, Govardhanram Tripathi and Gatubhai Gopilal Dhruv advocated reform through religion while Ramanbhai Nilkanth, Narsinhrao Divetia and Kant advocated non-religious way.

Dalpatram (1820–1898) and Narmad (1833–1886) are the trailblazers of modern Gujarati literature. Dalpatram's Venacharitra portrays his command over hilarity and wittiness. He contributed in prose and poetry. His prose works include plays, essays and other works such as Laxminatak, Mithyabhiman, Streesambhashan, Tarkikbodh, Daivagnadarpan and Bhootnibandh. His poetry include Farbasvilas, Farbasvirah, Dalpatpingal and Hope Vachanmala. Modern studies of Gujarat and its language began with the British administrator Alexander Kinlock Forbes shortly after the British occupation of the region. Alexander Forbes carried out an extensive investigation of Gujarati culture and literature over the previous thousand years and amassed a large collection of manuscripts. An organisation named after him, called the Farbas Gujarati Sabha, dedicates itself to the preservation and promotion of Gujarati literature and language and history from its headquarters in Mumbai. The first Gujarati dictionary, known as Narmakosh, was composed and compiled by Narmad; it is essentially a history of the world, and also an authority on poetics. He moved away from the subjects of medieval literature and wrote on freedom, nationalism, nature and romance. He attempted many varieties of poetry and smoothly adapted English verses into Gujarati. He wrote the first autobiography Mari Hakikat of Gujarati literature. He also wrote essays and plays. His Rukmini Haran and Virasinh are considered by scholars to be masterpiece compendia of poems.

Navalram Pandya pioneered criticism in Gujarati. The other notable works in Gujarati literature in this era are Bholanath Sarabhai's Ishvara Prarthanamala (1872), Navalram Pandya's Bhatt nu Bhopalu (1867) and Veermati (1869), and Nandshankar Mehta's Karan Ghelo (1866), which was the first original novel of Gujarati literature.

Ranchhodlal Udayaram Dave (1837–1923) is respected as the groundbreaker and trailblazer in the art of play-writing in Gujarati with his Lalita Dukh Darsak play. Other significant dramatists were Dalpatram, Narmad and Navalram.

Parsi writers of the era include Behramji Malabari who first authored original works in standardised Gujarati. Parsi authors wrote large number of works in Parsi Gujarati and standard Gujarati dialects as well as translated novels from English and French literature. They are credited with establishment of Gujarati theatre.

==== Scholar Era or Govardhan Era (1885–1915 AD) ====
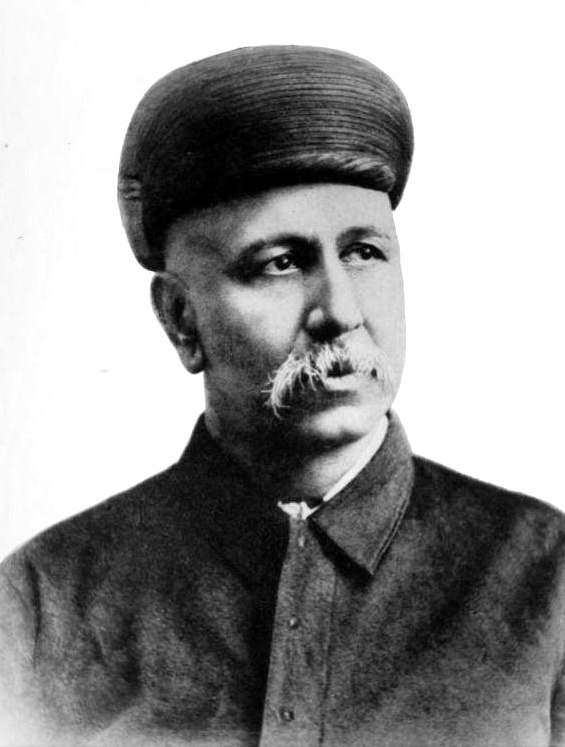
Govardhanram Tripathi

Pandit means 'a scholar' in Gujarati. During this era, the scholarly writing developed gradually, hence it is known as the Pandit era. The era is considered by Dhirubhai Thaker as a golden era of Gujarati literature when poetry, play, essays and biography reached its zenith. The writers of this era were authoring under the influence of westernisation and social reforms. In politics, it was a period of rise of Indian independence movement, established western education system and western study of ancient religious literature and cultural renaissance. The foreign literature had started influencing local literature in India and people were exposed to the outer influence. The writers of this era also had a reformative bent of mind, but they paid more attention towards literary accomplishments. Their fundamental belief was that the literature is not an art that anybody can attempt to write whatever comes to mind, but it is a creative art which demands seriousness and responsibility. Notable writers of this era include Govardhanram Tripathi, Manilal Dwivedi, Ramanbhai Neelkanth, Narsinhrao Divetia, Mansukhram Tripathi, Keshavlal Dhruv, Manishankar Ratnaji Bhatt 'Kant', Kalapi, Balwantray Thakore, Nhanalal, Anandshankar Dhruv etc.

Govardhanram Tripathi was the major novelists of era whose celebrated classic novel is Saraswatichandra. The work of others includes Narsinhrao Divetia's "Smarana Samhita", "Kusumamala", "Hridayavina", "Nupur Jhankar" and "Buddha Charit"; Manishankar Ratanji Bhatt or Kavi Kant's "Purvalap" ('Devayani', 'Atijnana', 'Vasanta Vijay' and 'Chakravak Mithuna') and Balwantray Thakore's "Bhanakar". Nhanalal was another important poet of this period in Gujarati literature, who had outshone incredibly in his "Apadya Gadya" or rhyming prose. Nhanalal's recognition and reputation is based on two poetic compilations, namely "Vasantotsava" (1898) and "Chitradarshan" (1921), an epic referred to as "Kuruksetra", and numerous plays like "Indukumar", "Jayajayant", "Vishva Gita", "Sanghamitra" and "Jagat Prerana".

==== Gandhi Era (1915–1945 AD) ====
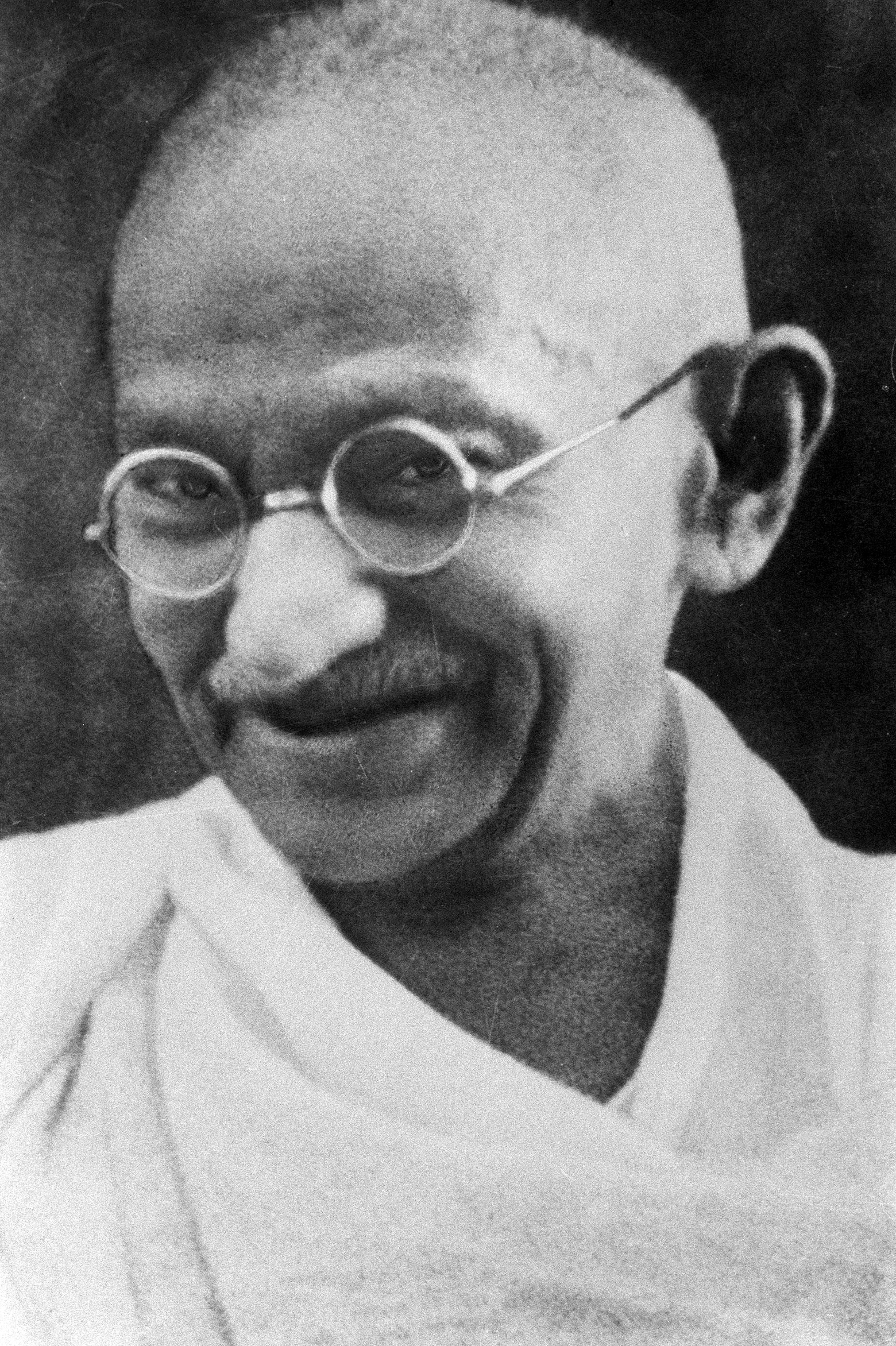
Mahatma Gandhi

The Pandit Era came to an end in 1914, when the First World War broke out. Mahatma Gandhi, with his weapon of Satyagraha (Friendly passive resistance) tried and tested in South Africa. Mahatma Gandhi left Africa and arrived in early January 1915. With penetrating insight he observed first hand the socio-economic and political conditions obtaining in India and thought about every question related to life. After Gandhi's arrival on the Indian scene, the literary climate of Gujarat, which was the hub of all Gandhi's socio-political activities, underwent a rapid change. Gandhi started editing Navajivan, a weekly periodical, and spread his thoughts and ideology.

During this period, Mahatma Gandhi and Gujarat Vidyapith became the nerve-centre of all literary activities, where new values emerged and more emphasis was given to Gandhian values, Indianisation and simplification. Novels, short stories, diaries, letters, plays, essays, criticisms, biographies, travel books and all kinds of prose began to flood Gujarati literature.

Gandhi, Ramnarayan V. Pathak, K. M. Munshi, Swami Anand, Umashankar Joshi, Sundaram, Jhaverchand Meghani, Pannalal Patel, Jyotindra Dave, Chandravadan Mehta, Zinabhai Desai ("Snehrashmi"), Vaid Mohanlal Chunilal Dhami, Manubhai Pancholi ("Darshak"), and Ishwar Petlikar are the main contributors of this age.

Modern Gujarati prose was ushered in with a bang by Narmad, but K.M. Munshi and, of course, the legend and nationalist himself, Mahatma Gandhi, gave it prominence in this age. Gandhi's autobiography, An Autobiography of My Experiments with Truth ((Gujarātī "સત્યના પ્રયોગો અથવા આત્મકથા")), Satyagraha in South Africa about his struggle there, Hind Swaraj or Indian Home Rule, a political pamphlet, and a paraphrase in Gujarati of John Ruskin's Unto This Last are his most well-known works. This last essay sets out his programme on economics. He wrote extensively on vegetarianism, diet and health, religion, social reforms, etc. Gandhi usually wrote in Gujarati, though he also revised the Hindi and English translations of his books.

Gandhi was a prolific writer. For decades he edited several newspapers including Harijan in Gujarati, Hindi and English; Indian Opinion while in South Africa and, Young India, in English, and "Navajivan", a Gujarati monthly, on his return to India. Later, "Navajivan" was published in Hindi. He wrote letters almost every day to individuals and newspapers.

During the 1940s, there could be witnessed a rise in communistic poetry and this inspired a movement for progressive literature in Gujarati too. Meghani, Bhogilal Gandhi, Swapnastha and others began to preach class conflict and hatred of religion through their writings. K.M. Munshi is deemed one of the most multi-talented and flexible and looming literary figures of Gujarati literature of contemporary times. K.M. Munshi's voluminous works include dramas, essays, short stories and novels. His famous novels are included in the list of "Patan ni Prabhuta", "Gujarat no Nath", "Jay Somnath" (1940), "Prithvi Vallabh", "Bhagavan Parshuram" (1946) and "Tapasvini" (1957).

Indeed, after the rise of Mahatma Gandhi's prominence in a steadily strengthening struggle for independence and social equality, a great volume of poetry, written by poets like Umashankar, Sundaram, Shesh, Snehrashmi and Betai, amongst others, centred on the existing social order, the struggle for independence and the travails of Mahatma Gandhi himself. Highly inspired by Rabindranath Tagore's dialogue poems, Umashankar Joshi enriched the existing Gujrati literature by penning in the same manner. Two such poems are his "Prachina" and "Mahaprasthan". For his poem "Nishith", he received the Jnanpith Award in 1967. Pannalal Patel received the Jnanpith Award in 1985 for his novel Manvini Bhavai.

The Gujarati novel was also made a household name by G.G. Joshi ('Dhumketu'), Chunilal V. Shah, Gunvantrai Acharya, Jhaverchand Meghani, Pannalal Patel and Manubhai Pancholi.

Significant dramatists of this age are Chandravadan Mehta, Umashankar Joshi, Jayanti Dalal and Chunilal Madia.

Amongst the important essayists, citation can be made of Kaka Kalelkar, Ratilal Trivedi, Lilavati Munshi, Jyotindra Dave, Ramnarayan V. Pathak.

==== Post-Gandhi Era (1940–1955 AD) ====
In this era there is a dominance of poetry. The main contributors of this age are Niranjan Bhagat, Rajendra Shah, Venibhai Purohit, Prahlad Parekh and Balmukund Dave. Rajendra Shah won the Jnanpith—the Indian government's most prestigious literary prize—for the year 2001. The judges noted, "his intensity of emotion and innovation in form and expression which set him apart as a poet of great significance. The mystical tone of his poetry stems from the tradition of great medieval masters like Kabir, Narsinh Mehta and literary giants like them". He authored more than 20 collections of poems and songs, mainly on the themes of the beauty of nature, and about the everyday lives of indigenous peoples and fisherfolk communities. In his poems using Sanskrit metrics, he was influenced by Rabindranath Tagore. He was one of the giants of the post Gandhi-era, called 'Anu-Gandhi Yug' in Gujarati literature.

==== Modern Era (1955–1985 AD) ====
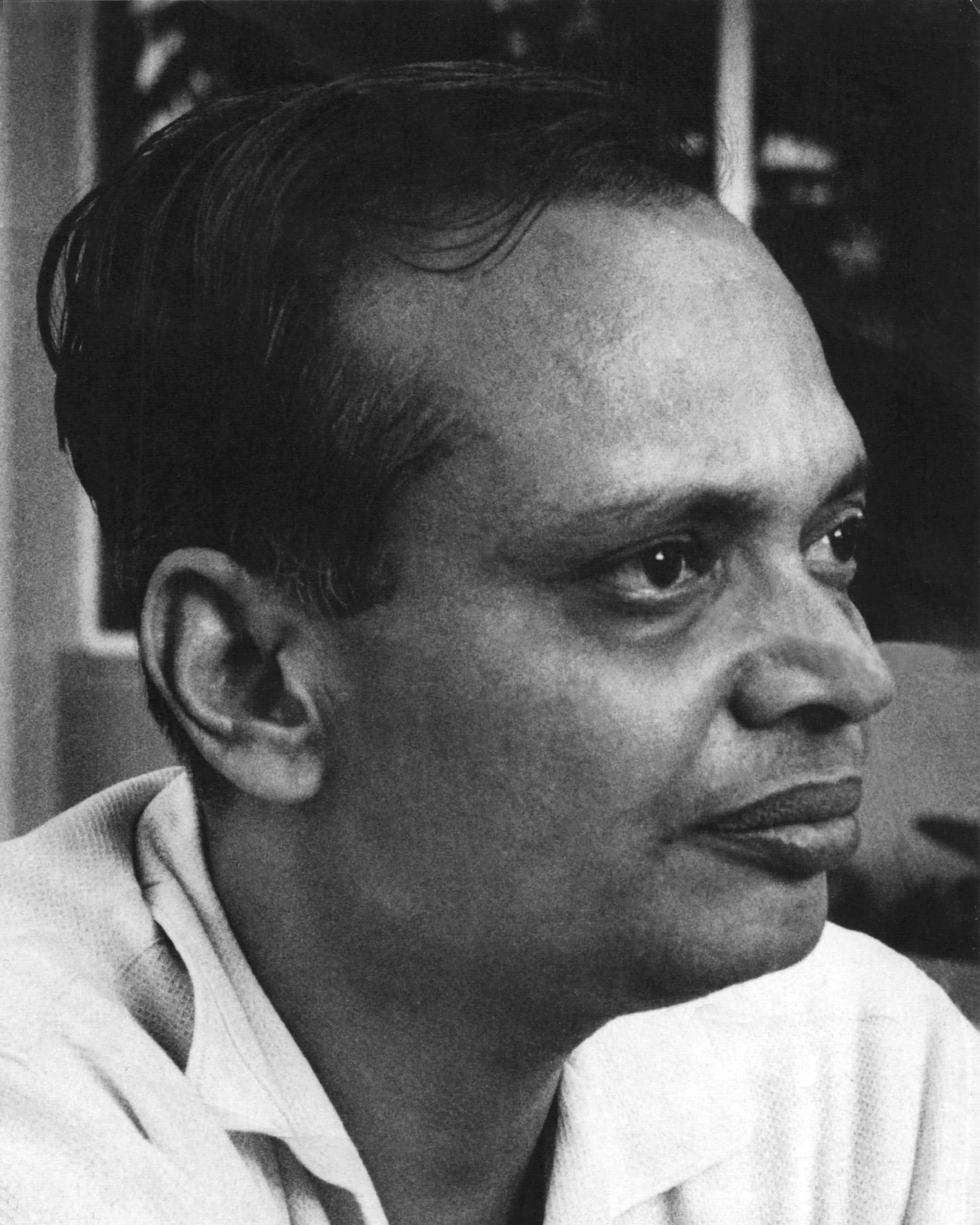
Suresh Joshi

Post-independence Gujarati poetry displays a higher form of subjectivity and explores newer philosophies and lines of thought and imagery. The poems became more subjective and brutal, discarding old imageries and symbols and replacing them with new ideas. Prominent Gujarati poets of the post-independence era include critically acclaimed poets like Suresh Joshi, Gulam Mohammed Sheikh, Harindra Dave, Manoj Khanderia, Chinu Modi, Nalin Raval and Adil Mansuri, among others.

Post-independence prose literature in Gujarati had two distinct trends, traditional and modern. The former dealt more with ethical values and its main writers were Gulabdas Broker, Mansukhlal Jhaveri, Vishnuprasad Trivedi and others. Existentialism, surrealism and symbolism influenced the latter. The modernists also wanted to do away with moral values and religious beliefs. Eminent writers of this trend comprise Niranjan Bhagat, Chandrakant Bakshi, Suresh Joshi, Madhu Rye, Raghuveer Chaudhari, Dhiruben Patel, Saroj Pathak, and others. There was also a noticeable segment of popular writers like Vithal Pandya, Sarang Barot, Dinkar Joshi, Harkisan Mehta and Ashwinee Bhatt whose novels found a place in the hearts of common people. Their novels reached every corner of Gujarat and also to vast Gujarati readers outside Gujarat through newspapers and magazines.

Gujarati prose has recorded growth and literary feats quite rapidly in less than two hundred years and now can be counted among the front benchers in Indian literature.

==== Postmodern Era (1985 – present) ====
Bhagwatikumar Sharma, Vinesh Antani, Dhruv Bhatt, Yogesh Joshi, Bindu Bhatt, Kanji Patel brought freshness in narration in novels. Same can be said for Bholabhai Patel, Manilal H. Patel, Anil Joshi for essays. Some new poets have also given significant literary work including Sanju Vala, Rajesh Vyas 'Miskin', Ankit Trivedi, Rajesh Vankar, Anil Chavda, Bhavesh Bhatt, Ashok Chavda, Kiransinh Chauhan, Neerav Patel and many others.

In this age, the other outstanding themes are Dalit literature and 'feminist literature'. Modern poetry continued to take its roots deep.

== Literary forms ==
- Akhyana (narrative poetry)
- Rasa
- Prabandha
- Barmasi
- Pada (verse)
- Padya-Vaarta
- Chhappa
- Khand-Kavya
- Bhavai
- Natak (play)
- Navalkatha (novel)
- Navlika (Novella)
- Tunki Varta (short story)
- Urmi-Kavita (lyric)
- Ghazal
- Aatma-Katha (autobiography)
- Jivan-Charitra (biography)
- Nibandh (essay)
- Fagu (lyrical poetry)
- Children's literature

== Firsts ==
- The printing was introduced in Gujarati in 1812. The first printed book published was the Gujarati translation of Dabestan-e Mazaheb prepared and printed by Parsi priest Fardunjee Marzban in 1815.
- 1822, first Gujarati newspaper: Mumbai Samachar, the oldest newspaper in India still in circulation.
- 1840s, personal diary composition: Nityanondh, Durgaram Mehta.
- 1845, first modern Gujarati poem: Bapani Piparu (Father's Pipar Tree), Dalpatram
- 1851, first essay: Mandaḷī Maḷvāthi Thātā Lābh, Narmadashankar Dave
- 1866, first original novel: Karaṇ Ghelo, Nandshankar Mehta.
- 1866, first social novel: Sasu Vahu ni Ladai, Mahipatram Rupram Nilkanth
- 1866, first autobiography: Mari Hakikat, Narmadashankar Dave.
- 1900, first original short story: Shantidas, Ambalal Sakarlal Desai.

== See also ==
- Gujarati language
- Gujarati journalism
- List of Gujarati-language writers
- List of Gujarati-language magazines
- § Dalit literature in Gujarati

== Notes and references ==
=== Bibliography ===
- Thaker, Dhirubhai (1993a). ગુજરાતી સાહિત્યની વિકાશરેખા-૧ [Development of Gujarati Literature-1] (in Gujarati). Ahmedabad: Gurjar Granthratna Karyalaya.
- Thaker, Dhirubhai (1993b). ગુજરાતી સાહિત્યની વિકાશરેખા-૨ [Development of Gujarati Literature-2] (in Gujarati). Ahmedabad: Gurjar Granthratna Karyalaya.
- Thaker, Dhirubhai (1993c). ગુજરાતી સાહિત્યની વિકાશરેખા-૩ [Development of Gujarati Literature-3] (in Gujarati). Ahmedabad: Gurjar Granthratna Karyalaya.
- Thaker, Dhirubhai (1993d). ગુજરાતી સાહિત્યની વિકાશરેખા-૪ [Development of Gujarati Literature-4] (in Gujarati). Ahmedabad: Gurjar Granthratna Karyalaya.
- Thaker, Dhirubhai (1993e). ગુજરાતી સાહિત્યની વિકાશરેખા-૫ [Development of Gujarati Literature-5] (in Gujarati). Ahmedabad: Gurjar Granthratna Karyalaya.
- Milestones in Gujarati Literature by K M Jhaveri.
- Brahmbhatt, Prasad. (2003) Kavyasarita. (Literary Criticism of the evolution of Poetry). Ahmedabad: Parshwa Publication.
- Trivedi, Ramesh. M. (1994) Arvachin Gujarati Sahityano Itihaas. (History of Modern Gujarati Literature). Ahmedabad: Adarsh Prakashan.
- Trivedi, Ramesh. M. (2005) Gujarati Sahityano Itihaas. (History of Gujarati Literature). Ahmedabad: Adarsh Prakashan.
- Jani, Nutan. (2005) Vishvakavita: Kavita-Tulana (World poetry: Comparison of Poetry). Mumbai.
- Joshi, Vidyut. (2004) Sahitya ane Samaj (Literature and Society) Ahmedabad: Parshwa Publication.
