= Balwantray Thakore =

Indian poet and writer (1869–1952)

- Balwantrai Thakore
- Born: Balwantray Kalyanray Thakore; 23 October 1869; Bharuch, Bombay Presidency
- Died: January 2, 1952 (aged 82); Mumbai
- Education: Master of Arts
- Alma mater: Deccan College, Pune
- Occupations: Poet, Critic
- Spouses: Chandramani
- Writing career
- Pen name: Valkal, Sehni
- Language: Gujarati
- Years active: 1886 - 1952
- Period: Pandit Era
- Genres: Sonnet
- Notable works: Bhankaar (1918; Dhara Paheli); Bhankaar (1928; Dhara Biji); Mhara Sonnet (1935)

Balwantray Kalyanray Thakore (23 October 1869 – 2 January 1952), popularly known as B. K. Thakore (Gujarati: બ.ક.ઠાકોર), was a poetry teacher and one of the great pioneers of the Pandit yug, during the turn of the twentieth century period in Gujarati literature. Known as 'Ballukaka' in his intimate circle, he played a key role in the development of modern Gujarati poetry.

== Early life ==
The son of a lawyer, Thakore was born on 23 October 1869 in Porbandar, and later moved to Bharuch in Gujarat. After attending school in Bharuch, he went to Rajkot for further education where he became acquainted with Navalram Pandya, a contemporary of Narmad, Mahatma Gandhi and Manishankar Bhatt 'Kant'. While studying at Rajkot, he came under the influence of Christianity. In his later life he also appreciated certain principles of Islam. At age 18, he married Chandramani. He later remarried after the death of his first wife.

== Education ==
Thakore learned Sanskrit from Manilal Dwivedi, a language in which he also composed poetry. He hoped to study abroad but was unable to do so due to the death of his wife, after which he had to take on the responsibility of raising his children. He graduated with honors from Deccan College in Pune, where he was awarded an Ellis scholarship for his high marks in English. Afterwards he went to Mumbai to sit the Indian Civil Service examinations, and started writing articles for The Times of India to support himself. He later worked as an assistant editor with the Indian Spectator. He subsequently returned to Deccan College to pursue his master's degree in arts. He was offered the position of assistant editor for the celebrated news weekly Maratha, but he declined the invitation. In 1983, he was awarded a gold medal for his historical essay An account of the first Madhavrao Peshwa.

== Career ==
Thakore taught history, economics, political science, logic, and ethics at the D. J. Sindh College in Karachi. He remained active throughout his life, even lecturing at Wilson College, Mumbai at the age of 80. He also started his own publishing house at around the same time, hoping to invigorate Gujarati literature. He died shortly after, at the age of 82, in Mumbai.

== Works ==
Thakore wrote under the pen-names 'Sehni' (Senani or military officer, after his great-grandfather Anuprai, who had been an officer in the army of the Scindias) and 'Valkal'. He wrote his first poem in 1886, published in the same year. His first essay on was published in 1891.

His sonnet sequence Premo Divas ("Day of love") and the collection of poems Bhankaar (published in 1917) are major contributions to Gujarati literature. They were followed by Mhara Sonnet (1935). He also wrote books on literary criticism; his first collection of critical essays, Kavitashikshana, was published in 1924, followed by Lyric (1928), Navin Kavita Vishe Vyakhyano (1943), Vividh Vyakhyano and Praveshako. Thakore emphasized very strongly the need of intellection in the meaning of poetry and of flexibility in its metre.

As an editor, he compiled a collection of Gujarati poetry, Aapani Kavita Samriddhi, in 1931, with the aim of introducing readers to some of the best poems in Gujarati literature. It has 85 poems written by 57 poets. The collection is considered to be a landmark in the history of Gujarati literature. With the same aim he started contributing a regular feature to a literary magazine called Prasthan, edited by Ramnarayan V. Pathak, where he selected a poem and discussed it in detail. He also edited Vachak Manimanikya's Ambad Vidyadhar Ras and Vachak Udaybhanu's Vikramcharit Ras. In co-operation with other scholars, he edited a series of six medieval 'Ras' poems called Gurjar Rasavali.

As a translator, he produced versions from Sanskrit of Kalidasa's Abhijnan Shakuntalam in 1906, Malvikagnimitra in 1933 and Vikramorvarshiyam in 1958. He adapted a Russian comedy by Valentin Kataev called Quadrature of the circle.

He also authored two plays, Ugati Jawani ("Rising Youth") and Lagnaman Brahmacharya, both published in 1923. A collection of his short stories was published as Darshaniyun in 1924. B.K. Thakoreni Dinki (1969) is a diary work by him. His historical works include Itihas Digdarshan (1928), An account of First Madhavrao Peshwa (1897) and Indian Administration to the Dawn of Responsible Government (1922).

The Shree Lalshankar Umiyashankar Arts and Harivadan and Padmaben Thakore Commerce College for Women was established in part by Thakore's support.

== See also ==
- List of Gujarati-language writers
