= Narayan Hemchandra =

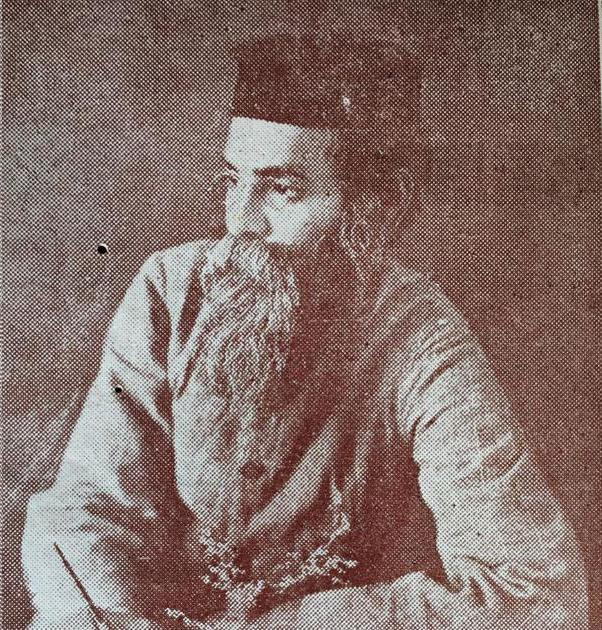
- Narayan Hemchandra in the late 1890s.
- Born: Narayan Hemchandra Divecha; 1855
- Died: 1904 (aged 48–49)
- Occupations: Autobiographer, translator and critic
- Writing career
- Notable work: Hu Pote (1900)

Narayan Hemchandra Divecha (1855–1904), commonly known as Narayan Hemchandra, was a Gujarati writer, translator and critic. He travelled extensively and wrote autobiography, novels, stories and criticism. He was a prolific translator and credited with introducing Bengali literature to Gujarat.

== Biography ==
Narayan Hemchandra Divecha was born in 1855 in Diu and spent most of his life in Bombay (now Mumbai). He had not studied much but had travelled extensively. He went to England four times. In 1875, he went to Allahabad with Navinchandra Roy where he started translating. He is credited with introducing Bengali literature to Gujarat.

He had influenced Mahatma Gandhi. Gandhi met him in England and described him as a queerly-looking and queerly dressed person. But he was not ashamed of his looks, clothes or poor English. Gandhi observed in Satyana Prayogo his great penchant to learn foreign languages to read their literature.

== Works ==
Hemchandra had written about two hundred works. Hu Pote (1900) was the first autobiography published in Gujarati language although the first autobiography was written by Narmad (published in 1933). (Note: Narmad had written his autobiography in 1866 but he had requested it to be published posthumously. It was published in 1933, on his birth centenary. Two autobiographies were published before it, Hu Pote (1900) by Narayan Hemchandra and Satyana Prayogo (1925-1929) by Mahatma Gandhi.) It is partially travelogue and was written on first 34 years of his life including his travels and experiences. He has also written about Debendranath Tagore and Dayanand Saraswati in it.

Panch Varta (1903) and Phooldani Ane Biji Vartao (1903) are collections of his stories. Vaidyakanya (1895), Snehkutir (1896), Roopnagarni Rajkunwari (1904) are his novels. His works on criticism include: Jivancharitra Vishe Charcha (1895), Sahitaycharcha (1896), Kalidas Ane Shakespeare (1900). Dharmik Purusho (June 1893), published by Gujarat Vernacular Society contains the life sketches of twelve prophets and saints like Chaitanya, Nanak, Kabir and Ramakrishna. He had also written a biography on Prophet Mohammed.

He was a prolific translator. His notable translations include: Doctor Samuel Johnson nu Jivancharitra (Biography of Samuel Johnson, 1839), Malatimadhav (1893), Priyadarshika and Sanyasi. He had translated large number of Bengali works in Gujarati including works of Rabindranath Tagore. He has also written on literature, education and music.

== See also ==
- List of Gujarati-language writers
