= Farbas Gujarati Sabha =

Farbas Gujarati Sabha is an organization dedicated to the promotion of Gujarati literature. It was established in 1865 in Bombay by Alexander Kinloch Forbes. At the time of established the organization was named the Gujarati Sabha but in the same year Forbes died, leading the organization to rename itself in his honour.
