= Premanand =

Premanand is a surname. Notable people with the surname include:

- Basava Premanand (1930–2009), Indian skeptic and rationalist
- Bhai Premanand (1876–1947), Indian nationalist and founding member of the Ghadar Party
- Premanand Bhatt (1636–1714), Gujarati poet
- Premanand Lotlikar (born 1954), Indian former actor and theatre director
- Premanand Maharaj (born 1971), Indian Hindu ascetic and spiritual leader, sometimes known mononymously as "Premanand"
- Premanand Sangodkar (born 1941), Indian former stage actor, playwright, and director
- Premanand Swami (1784–1854), Gujarati Hindu saint, poet, and musician
- Umakant Premanand Shah (1915–1988), Indian academic

== See also ==
- Premanand Suvarna Chandrak (Premanand Gold Medal), literary award named in honour of Premanand Bhatt
