= Mari Hakikat =

Autobiography by Narmadashankar Dave (1933)

- Cover of critical edition, 1994
- Author: Narmadashankar Dave
- Original title: મારી હકીકત
- Translator: Abhijit Kothari
- Language: Gujarati
- Genre: Autobiography
- Published: 1866 (Limited copies); 1933 (First edition); 1994 (Critical edition)
- Publisher: Gujarati Press (First edition), Kavi Narmad Yugavart Trust (Critical edition)
- Publication place: India
- English publication date: 2025
- Media type: Print
- Pages: 73 (Limited copies); 184 (Critical edition)

Mari Hakikat (Gujarati pronunciation: [ˈmɑɾi ɦəˈkikət̪]) is the autobiography of Narmad—a Gujarati author from Surat in 19th-century India. It was the first autobiography to be written in the Gujarati language. (Note: Durgaram Mehta had written Nityanondh in the 1840s, but it was more a personal diary than an attempt at a formal English-style autobiography. Mahipatram Rupram Nilkanth had then written a biography, Durgaram Charitra (1879) based on the diary.) Written in 1866, it was published posthumously in 1933 on the centenary of Narmad's birth. (Note: Narmad had written his autobiography in 1866 but he had requested it to be published posthumously. It was published in 1933, on his birth centenary. Two autobiographies were published before it, Hu Pote (1900) by Narayan Hemchandra and Satyana Prayogo (1925-1929) by Mahatma Gandhi.)

== Origin and publication history ==
Narmad wrote Mari Hakikat in 1866. He explained his intentions at the start of his autobiography;

I am not writing this autobiography for anybody else but for myself. For me; it is not for recognition (I am already recognized), money or designation but for the encouragement [to me] in future from the past.

He added that his life will give some message to people. Narmad was candid and outspoken and he believed that his thoughts and works are exemplar. To give insights in his mind and world around him, he chose to write as openly as possible about events in his life, people connected with those events, his relations with those people and the results of those relationships.

Narmad had published a collection of his essays as Narmagadya: Book 1 in 1865. Suratni Mukhatesar ni Hakikat was published as Narmagadya: Book 2: Issue 1 in 1866 from page 1 to page 59. He had intended to publish Mari Hakikat as Narmagadya: Book 2: Issue 2, but later changed his mind.

After his death in 1886, his friend Navalram Pandya published a biography of Narmad, Kavijivan (1880) which was based on the autobiography. He wrote that Narmad had only two to five copies printed, which were given to close friends, and had requested it be published only after his death. Natwarlal Desai, his editor and son of another close friend Ichchharam Desai, also corroborated this. But later research found that Narmad had printed 400 copies of the autobiography; it is mentioned in Narmakavita (1866–67), in which he had included a list of all his books along with the number of published copies of each. Narmad may have destroyed all but a few copies but there has been no firm proof of it.

The limited print copy had 73 pages of two columned Royal size pages. It was page number 60 to 132 of Narmagadya: Book 2: Issue 2, printed by Union Press, owned by his friend Nanabhai Rustomji Ranina. As Narmad's only son Jayshankar died in 1910 without any heir, he had assigned the management of his father's works to his friends, Mulchand Damodardas Mukati and Thakordas Tribhuvandas Tarkasr. They had transferred copyrights of these works to Gujarati Press in 1911.

Kanaiyalal Munshi had published a few chapters in Gujarat magazine in 1926, but stopped when the copyright holder, Gujarati Press objected. Gujarati Press published some excerpts from Mari Hakikat in the Diwali editions of Gujarati in 1930 and 1931, finally publishing the full version in 1933, the birth centenary of Narmad. Later in 1939, they also published Uttar Narmad Charitra which included some notes and letters as a followup to the autobiography.

Mari Hakikat is not in continuous prose and includes many notes. Narmad had started keeping notes in 1854, and written the first draft based on information told to him by his father and relatives, papers available in his home, his expense book and his memory. He organised all available information into a timeline and filled in gaps with other information. He had described his autobiography as 'incomplete' and a 'draft' and intended to rewrite it at some future date.

His prime motive for writing was self encouragement. Other motives were to popularize autobiographies in Gujarati, to give insight into his life to his friends and clarify truths about his life and leave a record of them after his death. He had decided to write as truthfully as possible about his life and his relatives, friends and foes. He did not intended to hurt anybody, and later decided not to publish publicly as he intended it only for his own encouragement.

When Gujarati Press closed operations, they deposited one of his limited copies printed in 1866, with proofreading notes by Narmad himself, at M. T. B. College, Surat.

The first edition published in 1933 had several omissions and misprints. A later edition was edited by Dhirubhai Thaker. After the Kavi Narmad Yugavart Trust was established they decided to republish Narmad's entire works. They researched original manuscripts, limited copies and earlier editions, also examining all the literature of Narmad and extracting writings and letters that were autobiographical in nature. This critical edition consisting of the autobiography, autobiographical notes and letters was edited by Ramesh M. Shukla and published by the Trust in 1994.

== Contents of critical edition, 1994 ==
The critical edition is divided in four sections.

The first section covers the autobiography written in 1866. It consists of his birth to 1866, divided into ten subsections, or Viram. All titles and subtitles of the Virams were given by his editor Natwar Desai. It covers his life from 3 September 1833 to 18 September 1866. It covers his birth, his parents and relatives, his education, his formative years, his reformist stand, his rise and career. The second section covers essays and notes written by him which are autobiographical in nature. It includes notes and thoughts on his personal life, his family, and his own works. The third section covers letters written to various relatives, friends and people of his time. The fourth section covers appendices which include scans of his and his companions' writings, legal documents, notes and timeline.

In the beginning of the book Narmad write:

"The story in the book is incomplete, it is simply a jotting down the notes. Yet in the book I won't write those things which I think improper. But whatever I write will be nothing but truth as known to me, without being bothered about public opinion and my own interest."

— Narmad

And apparently, he has frankly written about his cowardice, his calf love, his attempts to attract women, his dislike of his contemporary poet Dalpatram and their clash, his conflict with his father, how he once arranged a musical concert at his residence under depression and spent five hundred rupees for it, his financial crisis, betrayal by friends, his private love affairs, etc. The book gives clear picture of Narmad's personality, his egoism, hypersensitive nature, generosity and extravagance. There are attempts of self glorification, and attitude of self-righteousness. The language he used has a ting of Surati dialect and the style is fully reflective of his personality.

== Reception ==
Chandrakant Topiwala has highlighted candidness, honesty at the expense of narrative and efforts of introspection as major elements of the autobiography. He has also praised its prose. Dhirubhai Modi has criticised its language without beauty but praised its truthfulness and honesty. He has also praised it for its accuracy and the efforts of writing it. Chandravadan Mehta gave tribute to author by writing,

Oh! Narmad. Your autobiography, even if it is incomplete, or even if it does not accepted in today's [literary] structure or tomorrow's, even if anybody had tried the same before, your [autobiography] has a clank of truth and thats enough. By knowing it, we will celebrate your courageous and honest book in Gujarati literature and will continue to tribute you by reading it.

Gulabdas Broker described it as 'very bold, sincere and beautiful autobiography'. However Gujarati critic, Vishwanath M. Bhatt noted that Narmad's autobiography lacks coherence, order and the sense of discrimination about what to write.

== Translation and adaptation ==
Mari Hakikat was translated into English by Abhijit Kothari under the title My Truth (2025). Narmad: Mari Hakikat or Narmad: My Life, a soliloquy based on his autobiography and life, was written and directed by Harish Trivedi. It was performed by Chandrakant Shah. It was premiered in Dayton, Ohio, US in 1995 and later toured India, United Kingdom and France. It was critically acclaimed.
