= Navalram Pandya =

Gujarati author (1836–1888)

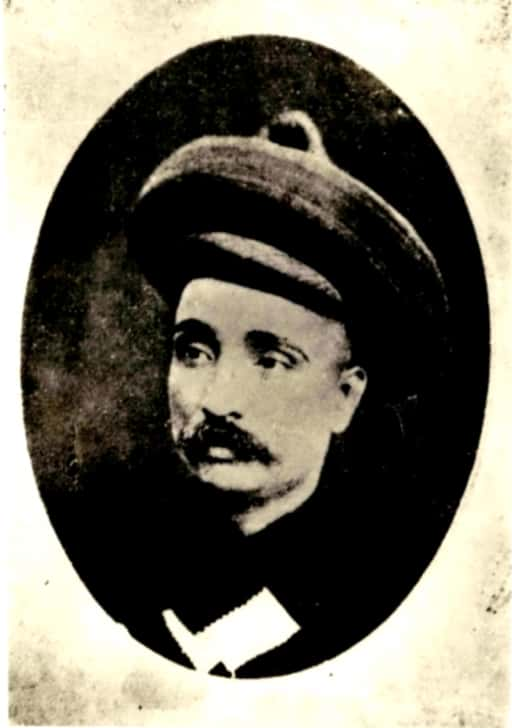
- Born: Navalram Laxmiram Pandya; 9 March 1836; Surat, British India
- Died: 7 August 1888 (aged 52); Rajkot, British India
- Occupations: Literary critic, playwright, poet, essayist, editor, and educationist
- Spouses: Shivagauri (m. 1847, died) Manigauri (m. 1850)
- Writing career
- Language: Gujarati
- Notable works: Bhatnu Bhopalu (1867); Kavijivan (1888)

Navalram Laxmiram Pandya (9 March 1836 – 7 August 1888) was a Gujarati critic, playwright, poet, essayist, editor, and educationist. He is considered to be a most important figure in modern Gujarati literature. The first humorist, the first historical dramatist, the first critic and a leading scholar of his age, Navalram was the first to herald the new generation of writers like Manilal Dwivedi, Govardhanram Tripathi and Narsinhrao Divetia. His writings covered numerous areas, including philosophy, patriotism, reformation, education, journalism, grammar and literature.

== Life ==
Navalram was born on 9 March 1836 in Surat (now in Gujarat) to Nandkor and Lakshmiram Pandya. Physically weak as a child, he didn't take much interest in games and was introvert in nature. At the age of eleven, he passed the final vernacular exam and got admission in an English school as a free merit scholar. He passed his matriculation exam in 1853. Though he was a prodigy in mathematics, he didn't go to college and joined as an Additional Teacher at the English High School in Surat in 1854. From there he went to Deesa and joined the Anglo Vernacular School. Then he became the assistant principal of Ahmedabad Training College and worked there from 1870 to 1876. In 1876, he became the Principal of Rajkot Training College and lived there until his death on 7 August 1888.

In 1847, at the age of 11, he married Shivagauri, who died after 10 months of marriage. His second marriage was with Manigauri in 1850. His son, Dhimatram, was born in 1867, while his daughter, Kamla, in 1871.

Govardhanram Tripathi and Vijayray Vaidya published his biography as Navalram Lakshmiram Ni Jivankatha (1940) and Shukra Tarak (1944) respectively.

== Works ==
In addition to writing literary essays and book reviews, Navalram was a critic of distinction. He started his writing career with a report on the Maharaj Libel Case (1863).

=== Plays ===
In 1867, he penned the Gujarati Bhatnu Bhopalu, based on Henry Fielding's The Mock Doctor, a play which in its turn had been adapted from French playwright Molière's Le Médecin malgré lui. He wrote the historical play Veermati in 1869, based on the story of Jagdev Parmar, published in Alexander Kinloch Forbes' Ras Mala.

=== Criticism ===
He reviewed the first Gujarati novel, Karan Ghelo in Gujarat Mitra daily in 1867, pioneering the criticism of Gujarati literature.

=== Prose ===
Navalram was an editor of Gujarat Shala Patra, a periodical on education. He wrote serial commentary on poetry with humour titled Akbarshah ane Birbal Nimitte Hindi Hasyatarang in the periodical from 1860 to 1870. His other serialized writing in periodical Engrej Lok no Sankshipt Itihas (Concise History of Englishmen, 1880–1887) was later edited and published by Balwantray Thakore in 1924. He translated Kalidasa's Meghadūta (1870) in Gujarati and also discussed the methodology of translation in it. Kavijivan (1888) is a biographical work on Gujarati poet and social reformer Narmad based on his autobiography, Mari Hakikat.

=== Others ===
His poetry collections Balalagnabatrisi (1876) criticized child marriage while Balagarbavali (1877) is about ideals of life of women. He edited Premanand Bhatt's Kunwarbai nu Mameru (1871). His Vyutpattipatha (1887) was a pioneer essay on philology in Gujarati while Nibandh-riti was an essay on writing essays.

His complete works are published under Navalgranthavali (1891), edited by Govardhanram Tripathi.

== See also ==
- List of Gujarati-language writers
