= Narmakosh =

Monolingual Gujarati dictionary prepared by Narmadashankar Dave (1873)

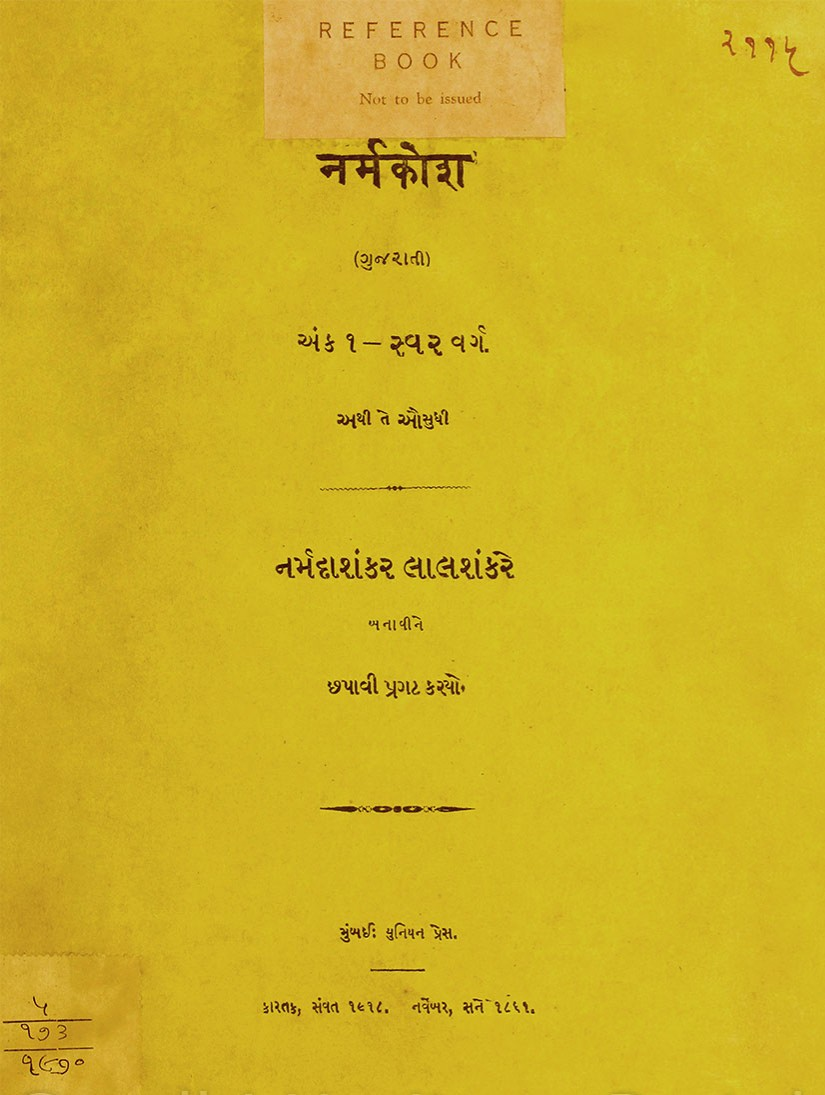
- Title page of first volume, 1861
- Author: Narmadashankar Dave
- Original title: નર્મકોશ
- Language: Gujarati
- Publication date: Vol. 1 (1861); Vol. 2 (1862); Vol. 3 (1864); Vol. 4 (1873)
- Publication place: India
- OCLC: 40551020
- LC Class: PK1847 .N37 1998

Narmakosh (pronounced [nər.mə.koʃ]), published in 1873, is a monolingual Gujarati dictionary prepared by Narmadashankar Dave (1833–1886), a poet and scholar. Regarded as the first of its kind in the Gujarati language, it contains 25,268 words.

== History ==
"School students used to find it difficult to comprehend some of the words in my poems. Hence, I decided to compile a 'vocabulary' of all such words by arranging them in alphabetical order. When I started the compilation I realized that such words were far too many. This motivated me to create a dictionary which would contain majority of the words in Gujarati language. Dr. Dhirajram endorsed this idea and on the 10th November, 1860 I started this compilation."

— Narmad, Mari Hakikat, p. 58

Narmad's poems were prescribed for studies in schools. Because he had introduced a new style of writing, students were finding it difficult to understand the meaning of many words of Sanskrit origin that he used in his poems. Complaints reached him and he decided to compile all of the difficult words he had used in his poems and of give their meanings, to enable students to fully comprehend them. Later he decided to expand this into a dictionary covering all the words in the Gujarati language which would be useful to students. Narmad worked for Eight years, 1860 to 1868, to prepare it.

The first volume of the dictionary was published in 1861, the second in 1862, the third in 1864 and the fourth and last volume, though prepared in 1866, was published in 1873. In 1873 edition, Narmad discussed in detail the rules of writing in the Gujarati language. He also published his most famous poem, "Jai Jai Garavi Gujarat", for the first time, in the preface of the book. Before Narmad, several attempts had been made in Gujarat to compile dictionaries, but all employed both English and Gujarati in their definitions. Narmakosh was the first dictionary to explain the meaning of Gujarati words solely in Gujarati. It contains 25,268 words.

== Reception ==
K. M. Jhaveri considered it one of Narmad's best works, and said that "It has remained a model dictionary ever since it was published in 1873".
