= Jai Jai Garavi Gujarat =

State song of Gujarat, India

Jay Jay Garvi Gujarāt
English: Victory to Proud Gujarat
- જય જય ગરવી ગુજરાત
- Emblem of Gujarat
- State song of Gujarat, India
- Lyrics: Narmadashankar Dave, 1873
- Adopted: 2011

"Jai Jai Garavi Gujarat" (Note: Gujarati pronunciation: [dʒəj dʒəj ˈgəɾʋi ˈgudʒɾat]; lit. 'Victory to Proud Gujarat') is a poem written by Gujarati poet Narmadashankar Dave in 1873. It is used as a state anthem during ceremonies of the Government of Gujarat.

== Composition ==
Narmad is considered the first modern Gujarati writer. He wrote the poem in 1873 as the foreword of his first Gujarati dictionary, Narmakosh.

In this poem, Narmad epitomises the sense of pride in the region by identifying the region of Gujarati people. He delineates the boundary within which the Gujarati-speaking population live: Ambaji in the north; Pavagadh in the east; Kunteshwar Mahadev near Vapi in the south; and Somnath, Dwarka in the west. This region mentioned by him now forms modern-day Gujarat, the western state of India. At the end of the poem, Narmad gives hope to the people of Gujarat that the dark clouds is lifting, and a new dawn is about to emerge.

In 2011, the composition sung by various Gujarati singers was released by the Government of Gujarat.

== Lyrics ==
=== Gujarati original ===
Gujarati script

જય જય ગરવી ગુજરાત!
જય જય ગરવી ગુજરાત,
દીપે અરુણું પરભાત,
જય જય ગરવી ગુજરાત!

ધ્વજ પ્રકાશશે
ઝળળ કસુંબી,
પ્રેમ શૌર્ય અંકિત;
તું ભણવ ભણવ
નિજ સંતતિ સઉને,
પ્રેમ ભક્તિની રીત
ઊંચી તુજ સુંદર જાત,
જય જય ગરવી ગુજરાત!

ઉત્તરમાં અંબા માત,
પૂરવમાં કાળી માત,
છે દક્ષિણ દિશમાં કરંત રક્ષા,
કુંતેશ્વર મહાદેવ;
ને સોમનાથ ને દ્વારકેશ એ,
પશ્ચિમ કેરા દેવ
છે સહાયમાં સાક્ષાત,
જય જય ગરવી ગુજરાત!

નદી તાપી નર્મદા જોય,
મહી ને બીજી પણ જોય.
વળી જોય સુભટના
જુદ્ધ રમણને,
રત્નાકર સાગર;
પર્વત ઉપરથી વીર પૂર્વજો,
દે આશિષ જયકર
સંપે સોયે સઉ જાત,
જય જય ગરવી ગુજરાત!

તે અણહિલવાડના રંગ,
તે સિદ્ધરાજ જયસિંગ.
તે રંગ થકી પણ અધિક સરસ રંગ,
થશે સત્વરે માત!
શુભ શકુન દીસે
મધ્યાહ્ન શોભશે,
વીતી ગઈ છે રાત.
જન ઘૂમે નર્મદા સાથ,
જય જય ગરવી ગુજરાત!

Latin script

Jay jay garvi Gujrāt,
Jay jay garvi Gujrāt!
Dipe aruṇuṁ parbhāt,
Jay jay garvi Gujrāt!

Dhvaj prakāśaśe
Jhaḷaḷ kasumbi,
Prem śaurya ankit;
Tuṁ bhaṇav bhaṇav
Nij santati saune,
Prem bhaktini rit
Uṁci tuj sundar jāt,
Jay jay garvi Gujrāt!

Uttarmaṁ amba māt,
Purvamaṁ kāḷi māt,
Che dakṣiṇ diśmaṁ karant rakṣa,
Kunteśvar mahādev;
Ne somnāth ne dvārkeś e,
Paścim kera dev
Che sahāymaṁ sākṣāt,
Jay jay garvi Gujrāt!

Nadi tāpi narmada joy,
Mahi ne biji paṇ joy.
Vaḷi joy subhaṭna
Juddh ramaṇne,
Ratnākar sāgar;
Parvat uparthi vir purvajo,
De āśiṣ jaykar
Sampe soye sau jāt,
Jay jay garvi Gujrāt!

Te aṇhilvāḍnā rang,
Te siddharāj jaysing.
Te rang thaki paṇ adhik saras rang,
Thaśe satvare māt!
Śubh śakun dise
Madhyāhn śobhaśe,
Viti gai che rāt.
Jan ghume narmada sāth,
Jay jay garvi Gujrāt!

IPA transcription (Note: See Help:IPA/Gujarati and Gujarati phonology.)

[dʒəj dʒəj gəɾ.ʋi gudʒ.ɾat̪ |]
[dʒəj dʒəj gəɾ.ʋi gudʒ.ɾat̪ ‖]
[d̪i.pe(‿)ə.ɾu.ɳũː pəɾ.bʱat̪ |]
[dʒəj dʒəj gəɾ.ʋi gudʒ.ɾat̪ ‖]

[d̪ʱʋədʒ pɾə.ka.ʃə.ʃe]
[dʒʱə.ɭəɭ kə.sum.bi |]
[pɾem ʃəʋɾj(‿)əŋ.kit̪ |]
[t̪ũː bʱə.ɳəʋ bʱə.ɳəʋ]
[nidʒ sən̪.t̪ə.t̪i sə(.)u.ne |]
[pɾem bʱək.t̪i.ni ɾit̪]
[ũː.tʃi t̪udʒ sun̪.d̪əɾ dʒat̪ |]
[dʒəj dʒəj gəɾ.ʋi gudʒ.ɾat̪ ‖]

[ut̪.t̪əɾ.mãː əm.ba mat̪ |]
[puɾ.ʋə.mãː ka.ɭi mat̪ |]
[tʃʰe d̪ək.ʃiɳ d̪iʃ.mãː kə.ɾən̪t̪ ɾək.ʃa |]
[kun̪.t̪eʃ.ʋəɾ mə.ɦa.d̪eʋ |]
[ne som.nat̪ʰ ne(‿d̪.)ʋaɾ.keʃ(‿)e |]
[pəʃ.tʃim ke.ɾa d̪eʋ]
[tʃʰe.sə.ɦaj.mãː sak.ʃat̪ |]
[dʒəj dʒəj gəɾ.ʋi gudʒ.ɾat̪ ‖]

[nə.d̪i t̪a.pi nəɾ.mə.d̪a dʒoj |]
[mə.ɦi ne bi.dʒi pəɳ dʒoj ‖]
[ʋə.ɭi dʒoj su.bʱəʈ.na]
[dʒu(d̪)d̪ʱ ɾə.məɳ.ne |]
[ɾət̪.na.kəɾ sa.ɡəɾ |]
[pəɾ.ʋət̪(‿)u.pəɾ.t̪ʰi ʋiɾ puɾ.ʋə.dʒo |]
[d̪e(‿)a.ʃiʃ dʒəj.kəɾ]
[səm.pe so.je sə(.)u dʒat̪ |]
[dʒəj dʒəj gəɾ.ʋi gudʒ.ɾat̪ ‖]

[t̪e(‿)əɳ.ɦil.ʋaɖ.na ɾəŋ(g) |]
[t̪e si(d̪)d̪ʱ.ɾadʒ dʒəj.siŋ(g) ‖]
[t̪e ɾəŋg tʰə.ki pəɳ(‿)ə.d̪ʱik sə.ɾəs ɾəŋ(g) |]
[tʰa.ʃe sat̪.ʋə.ɾe mat̪ ‖]
[ʃubʱ ʃə.kun d̪i.se]
[məd̪ʱ.ja.ɦə ʃo.bʱə.ʃe |]
[ʋi.t̪i gə(.)i tʃʰe ɾat̪ ‖]
[dʒən gʱu.me nəɾ.mə.d̪a sat̪ʰ |]
[dʒəj dʒəj gəɾ.ʋi gudʒ.ɾat̪ ‖]

English translation

Victory to proud Gujarat,
Victory to proud Gujarat!
Where glorious dawn shineth,
Victory to proud Gujarat!

Thy scarlet flag,
marked with love
and valour, shall shine.
Teach and teach
thy children daily,
the way of love and devotion.
High and beautiful is thy kind,
Victory to proud Gujarat!

In the north houseth Goddess Amba,
in the east houseth Goddess Kali,
in the south guarded by
Kunteshwer Mahadev;
Somnath and lord of Dwarka,
the Gods of the west
are all on guard.
Victory to proud Gujarat!

The rivers of Narmada, Tapi,
Mahi and others flow.
Look at the battles
fought by our gallant warriors,
and the sea of abundant resources.
From the tops of hills,
our gallant fathers bless for victory
and unite all castes.
Victory to proud Gujarat!

The olden glory of Anhilwad
and the mighty king Siddharaj Jaisinh
through aeons shall be surpassed,
O Mother!
The night hath passed,
the omen are blessed,
daytime shall rise;
Folks dance with Narmada.
Victory to proud Gujarat!

== See also ==
- List of Indian state songs
