= Narmad =

Indian Gujarati-language poet and scholar (1833–1886)

Narmadashankar Lalshankar Dave
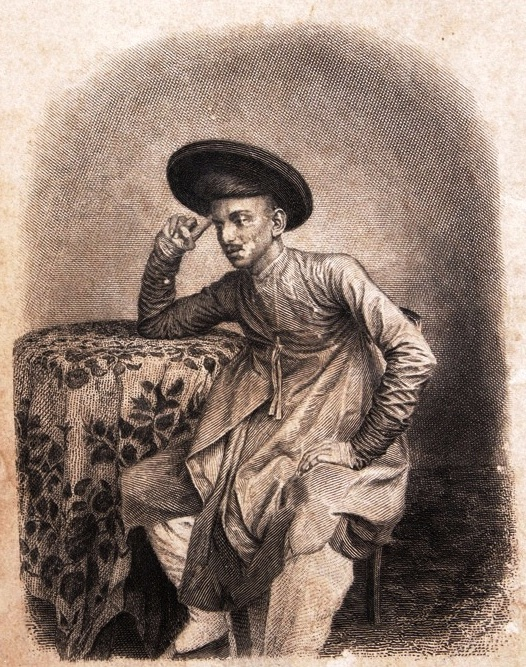
- Narmad in 1860 (wood engraving for his publication, after an oil painting)
- Born: 24 August 1833; Surat, Baroda state
- Died: 26 February 1886 (aged 52); Bombay, Bombay presidency, British India (now Mumbai)
- Occupations: Poet; playwright; essayist; lexicographer; reformer
- Spouses: Gulab (m. 1844–1853) Dahigauri (m. 1856–1886) Subhadra (Narmadagauri) (m. 1869–1886)
- Children: Jayshankar (1870-1910)
- Writing career
- Pen name: Narmad
- Website: Narmad

Narmadashankar Lalshankar Dave (Note: Gujarati pronunciation: [ˈnəɾməd̪ɑˌʃəŋkəɾ ˈlalʃəŋkər ˈd̪əʋe]) (24 August 1833 – 26 February 1886), popularly known as Narmad, (Note: English: /ˈnɑːrmæd/; Gujarati pronunciation: [ˈnəɾməd̪]) was an Indian Gujarati-language poet, playwright, essayist, orator, lexicographer and reformer under the British Raj. He is considered to be the founder of modern Gujarati literature. After studying in Bombay, he stopped serving as a teacher to live by writing. During his prolific career, he introduced many literary forms in Gujarati. He faced economic struggles but proved himself as a dedicated reformer, speaking loudly against religious and social orthodoxy. His essays, poems, plays and prose were published in several collections. His Mari Hakikat, the first autobiography in Gujarati, (Note: In the 1840s, Durgaram Mehta had written his personal diary, Nityanondh but it was not an attempt of autobiography as in western style. Mahipatram Rupram had written a biography, Durgaram Charitra (1879) based on the diary.) was published posthumously. (Note: Narmad originally wrote his autobiography in 1866 but had requested that it be published posthumously. It was published in 1933, on the centenary of his birth. Two autobiographies were published before it, Hu Pote (1900) by Narayan Hemchandra and Satyana Prayogo (1925-1929) by Mahatma Gandhi.) His poem Jai Jai Garavi Gujarat is now the state anthem of Gujarat state of India.

== Early life ==
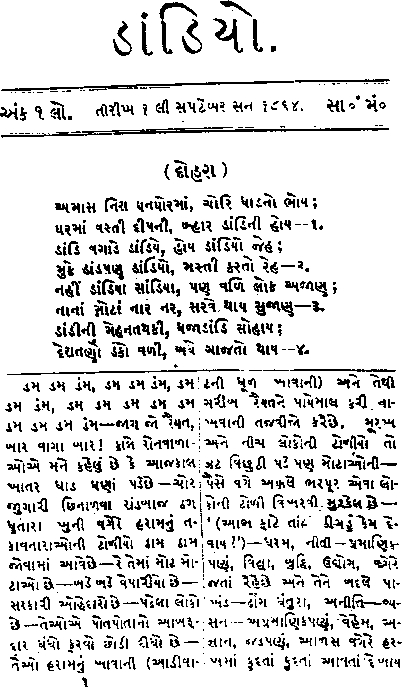
Dandiyo, dated 1 September 1864, first issue, page 1

Narmad was born in Surat, Gujarat on 24 August 1833 to Lalshankar and Navdurga in a Nagar Brahmin family. His family home in Amliran, Surat was destroyed in the great fire of 1837 but was later rebuilt. He commenced schooling with Nana Mehta in Bhuleshwar, Bombay at age five. He later joined Fakir Mehta and Ichchha Mehta's school in Surat and moved to Bombay where he attended the Government Gujarati school of Balgovind Mehta at Pydhonie. He returned to Surat where he attended the school of Durgaram Mehta and Pranshankar Mehta. He was initiated in Upanayan at age eight. He started studying at the English School, Elphinstone Institute, Bombay on 6 January 1845, beginning college in June 1850. He delivered his first public speech Mandali Malvathi Thata Labh (The Advantages of Forming An Association) that same year. His mother died on 23 November 1850 and he left college.

== Career ==
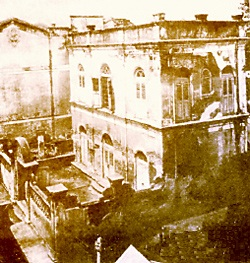
Saraswati Mandir was built by Narmad in 1866. Image taken in 1933. Now restored.

He was appointed a teacher at the school of Rander on 1 May 1851. He again recited his early essay in Swadesh Hitechchhu Mandali and started Gyansagar magazine in July 1851. He was transferred to a school in Nanpara in March 1853. After the death of his wife Gulab, he left this position and went to Bombay, in January 1854. He returned to college on the suggestion of his friend Jhaverilal Umiyashankar and joined Buddhi Vardhak Sabha, a literary group in June 1854. He started learning Siddhant Kaumudi.

He became interested in poetry and started writing in September 1855, studying literary metre over the following year. He presided over Buddhivardhak Granth from March to December 1856. After his second marriage, he left college in August 1856, writing Pingal Pravesh in February 1857 and dedicating it to his father. He joined Gokuldas Tejpal Vidyalaya as a teacher and began studying Sanskrit literary works such as Laghu kaumudi, Chandralok, Nrisimhachampu, Kavyachampu, Prataprudra, Adhyatma Ramayana. He started at Central School as a teacher in February 1858, then resigned in November 1858 after deciding to pursue a literary career.

He studied Sanskrit grammar and poetry in Pune from November 1858 to March 1859. Deciding to study independently he returned to Bombay in March, where he met Dalpatram, a reformist Gujarati poet, in June 1859, and became involved in reform activities.

His wife Dahigauri returned to her parents' home. In 1860, he had discussed widow remarriage with religious leader Jadunathji Maharaj, which led to him becoming involved with the Maharaj Libel Case the next year. The case was filed by Jadunathji against writer Karsandas Mulji after the journalist published an article alleging sexual exploitation of women in his religious sect.

He visited Income Tax Commissioner Curtis regarding a surcharge on 3 February 1863. With the help of friends, he started a biweekly newsletter called Dandiyo (lit. A drum stick), modelled after British weekly The Spectator, in September 1864. It was loudly reformist in its stand and attacked traditional customs of Hindu society. It ran until 1869 when it was merged with The Sunday Review. (Note: The Sunday Review was also closed after some time. Dandiyo was revived by Natwarlal Mulchand Vimawala in 1936. It was later renamed Prabhakar in March 1947.) On 18 January 1864, his father died, aged 56. He moved back to Surat in July 1865 and sheltered Savitagauri, a widow, in a neighbouring house. He published Narmagadya in September 1865. He was banished from his caste due to reform activities on 18 August but reinstated on 21 November 1866. The same year, he wrote his autobiographical work, Mari Hakikat, the first autobiography in Gujarati. He published Nayikavishaypravesh and Uttam Nayika dedicated to his then separated wife, Dahigauri. In early 1867, he published Narmakavita, a poetry collection. He had debts of 10,000 that caused him great concern. He married again in 1869. He published summaries of Ramayana, Mahabharata and Iliad in 1870. He published the school version of Narmagadya in 1874 and the edition for the government in 1875.

He moved back again to Bombay in March 1875, where he met Dayanand Saraswati, a reformist and founder of Arya Samaj, and started to become deeply religious. He published the first dictionary of Gujarati language in March 1876. He founded Vedsarasvati in Sarasvatimandir of Surat on 16 April 1877.

Aryanitidarshak Mandali performed his play Draupadi-Darshan in 1878. By 1880 he had become fully "believer" and performed Upanayana for his son that year. He wrote a play, Shri Sarshakuntal in 1881 which was performed. He published a translation of Bhagvad Gita in 1882. Although unhappy about breaking a resolve not to work for other people, he was forced due to financial difficulties into taking a position as a secretary to Gokuldas Tejpal Dharmakhata. He wrote a play, Shri Balkrishnavijay in 1883.

His health failing due to the stress of work starting a hostel, he left his job on 19 July 1885. After a prolonged eight-month illness, he died of arthritis on 26 February 1886 in Bombay.

== Works ==
Narmad is considered to be the founder of modern Gujarati literature. He introduced many creative forms of writing to the Gujarati language, including pioneering works in autobiography, poetry, lexicography, historical plays and folk literature research. He was an outspoken journalist and pamphleteer. Narmad was a strong opponent of religious fanaticism and orthodoxy. He promoted nationalism and patriotism with famous songs such as Sahu Chalo Jeetva Jang, wrote about self-government and discussed having one national language, Hindustani, for all of India, nearly five decades before Mahatma Gandhi or Nehru. His poem Jai Jai Garavi Gujarat, written in the preface of Narmakosh, listed with a sense of pride all the cultural symbols that go into constituting the Gujarati identity. These symbols included things non-Hindu, implying that Gujarat belongs to all the castes, communities, races, religions and sects that live together there. The poem is now de facto state song of Gujarat. Mahatma Gandhi acknowledged him for his philosophy of nonviolence.

His major collected works are Narmagadya (Gujarati: નર્મગદ્ય), collection of prose; Narmakavita (Gujarati: નર્મકવિતા), collection of poems; Narmakathakosh (Gujarati: નર્મકથાકોશ), collection of stories of characters of mythological literature and Narmakosh (Gujarati: નર્મકોશ), dictionary. His Mari Hakikat, the first autobiography in Gujarati, was published posthumously.

=== Poetry ===
His volumes of Narmakavita:1-3 (1858), Narmakavita:4-8 (1859) and Narmakavita:9-10 (1860) were collected into Narmakavita:Book 1 (1862). Later Narmakavita:Book 2 (1863) was published. All his poetry was later collected together in Narmakavita (1864). He introduced new subjects in modern Gujarati poetry such as social reform, freedom, patriotism, nature and love, etc.

His poem, "Jai Jai Garavi Gujarat" (1873), is used as a de facto state song for Gujarat.

=== Prose ===
His Rasapravesh (1858), Pingalpravesh (1857), Alankarpravesh (1858), Narmavyakaran Part I and II (1865), Varnavichar (1865), Nayika Vishaypravesh (1866) are his collections of essays on poetics with historical importance.

Rituvarnan (1861), Hinduoni Padati (1864), Kavicharit (1865), Suratni Mukhtesar Hakikat (1865), Iliadno Sar (1870), Mahipatram Rupram Mehta (1870), Mahapurushona Charitra (1870), Mahabharatano Sar (1870), Ramayanano Sar (1870), Sarshakuntal (1881), Bhagvadgitanu Bhashantar (1882) are his prose works. His other writings between 1850 and 1865 collected in Narmagadya (1865) and posthumously published Narmagadya-2 (1936) are his other prose works.

His essays are collected and edited in three volumes. They are Narmadgadya or Narmadashankar Lalashankarna Gadyatmak Granthono Sangrah (1875) edited by Mahipatram Rupram Nilkanth, Narmadnu Mandir-Gadya Vibhag (1937) edited by Vishwanath Bhatt and Narmadgadya (1975) edited by Gambhirsinh Gohil. His fifteen prose works were collected in Junu Narmadgadya Part I, II (1865, 1874) and are also important.

He had researched and edited several works. Manohar Swami's Manhar Pad (1860), Narmakosh: Issue 1 (1861), Narmakosh: Issue 2 (1862), Narmakosh:Issue 3 (1864), Narmakosh:Issue 4 (1865). Narmakathakosh (1870), Dayaramkrut Kavyasangrah (1865), Stree Geet Sangrah (1870) of songs popular in Nagar Brahmin ladies, Premanand's Dashamskandh (1872) and the complete issue of Narmakosh (1873) are his edited and researched works.

Tusli Vaidhvyachitra (dialogue, 1859), Ramjanaki Darshan (1876), Draupadidarshan (1878), Balkrishnavijay (1886), Krishnakumari are plays and dialogues. His Seetaharan (1878) was a previously unpublished play. Rajyarang Part I, II (1874, 1876) are his works on ancient and modern world history. Dharmavichar is his work on philosophy. Gujarat Sarvasangrah (1887) and Kathiawar Sarvasangrah (1887) are also historical works.

Mari Hakikat, his autobiography written in 1866 and published posthumously in 1933, is the first autobiography written in Gujarati. His notes and letters were later published as Uttar Narmad Charitra (1939).

=== Adaptations ===
Narmad:Mari Hakikat or Narmad:My Life, a critically acclaimed soliloquy based on his writings and life, was written and directed by Harish Trivedi and performed by Chandrakant Shah. It premiered in Dayton, Ohio, US in 1995 and later toured India, the UK and France. Chandravadan Mehta wrote a play based on his life.

== Honours ==
Narmad has been called Arvachino Ma Adya (Earliest Among the Moderns). His house, Saraswati Mandir, has been restored and converted into museum. Several places in Gujarat were named after him, such as Central Library in Surat. Busts of him have been erected in Ahmedabad, Vadodara and Surat. In 2004, South Gujarat University was renamed Veer Narmad South Gujarat University in his memory. A replica of his house is also constructed in the university campus. The literary honour Narmad Suvarna Chandrak has been yearly awarded by Narmad Sahitya Sabha, Surat since 1940. A special cover was released by India Post on his 175th birth anniversary in 2008.

== Personal life ==
He married Gulab, daughter of Surajram Shastri of Sudder Court, Surat, on 29 April 1844. She gave a birth to girl in 1852 who died 15 days later. Gulab herself died on 5 October 1853 following a stillbirth. In May 1856, he married Dahigauri, daughter of Tripuranand Shastri; she separated from him in 1860. He married Subhadra (later Narmadagauri), a widow of his caste, in 1869, breaking the customary taboo against widow remarriage. She gave birth to their son Jayshankar in 1870. Jayshankar worked as a clerk for Bombay Municipality, and never married, dying on 31 March 1910 of the plague.

== Contest with Dalpatram ==
Just at the time when Narmad was emerging into celebrity (1859), Dalpatram who had already won his laurels, happened to visit Bombay for treatment of his eyes. Lovers of Gujarati poetry, they met together, and in the poetical contest that took place, naturally they warmed up and their audience took sides as to who was the better poet. The result was a lifelong estrangement between the two. The contest was continued in the public papers and a humorous paper. The Parsi Punch, a weekly, published a cartoon, in which they were represented as fighting each other with the top-knot of the hair of their heads in their hands.

== Gallery ==
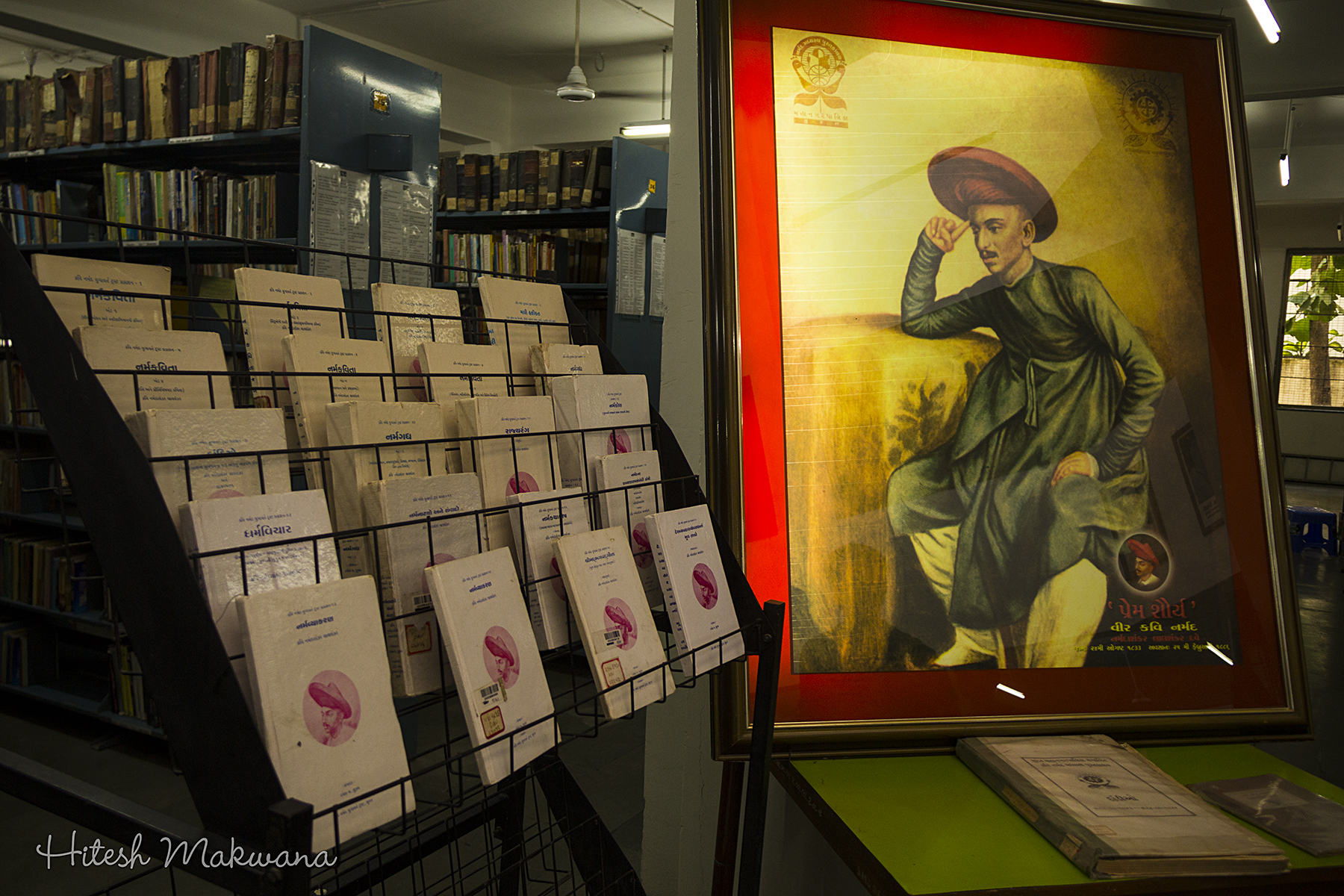
Kavi Narmad Central Library, Surat

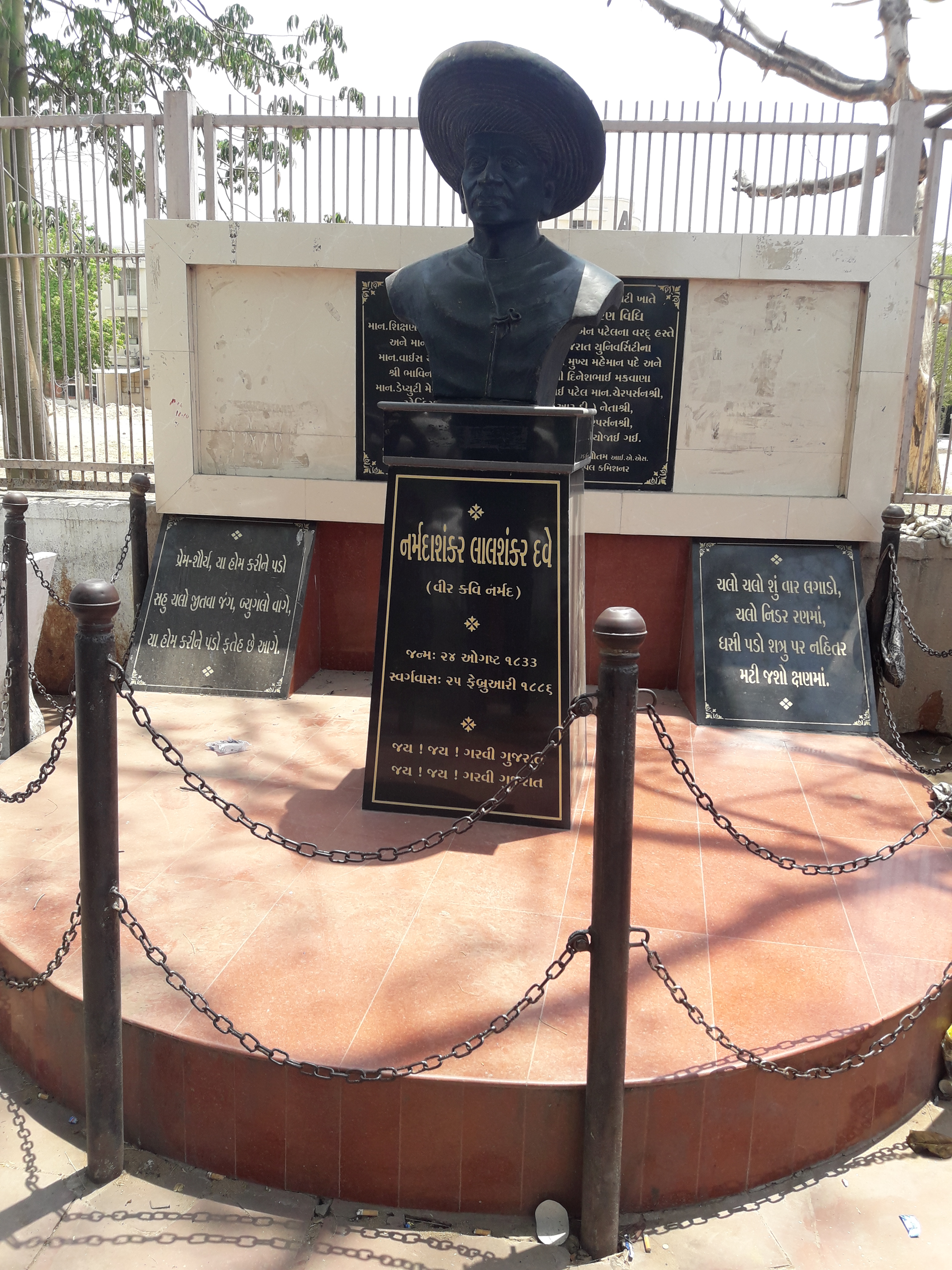
Bust near Gujarat University, Ahmedabad

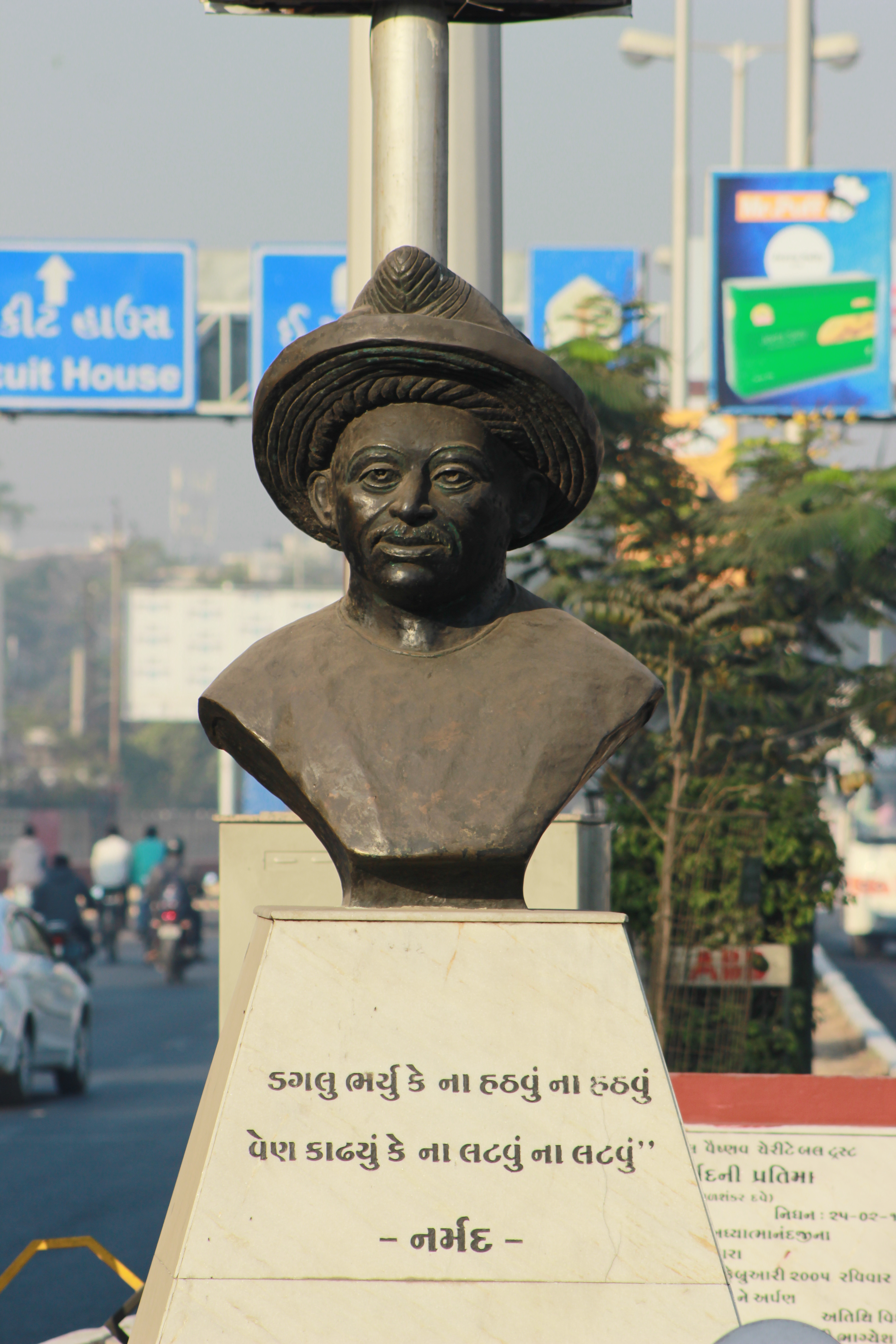
Bust in Vadodara

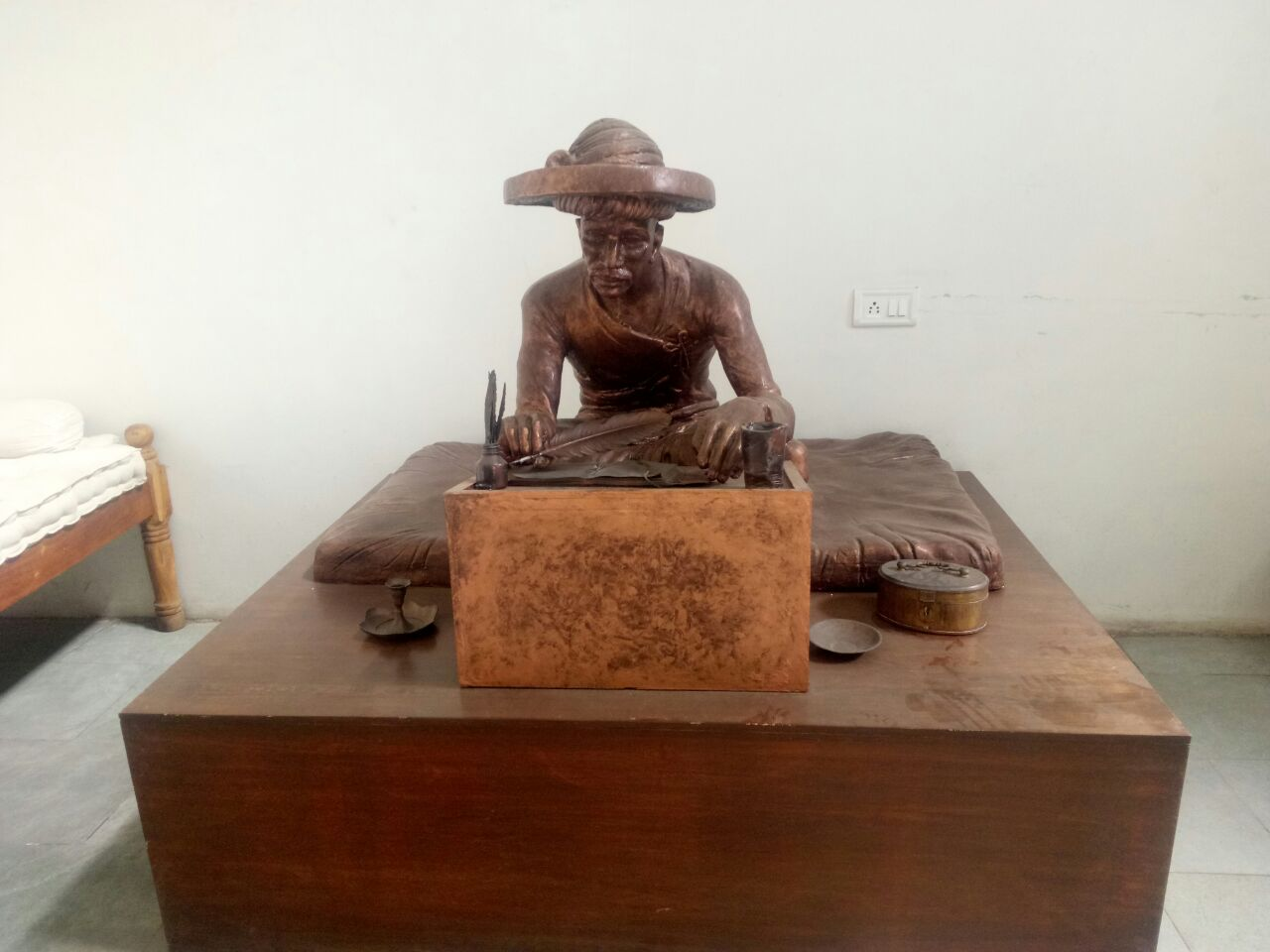
Statue of Narmad at display in museum at Surat

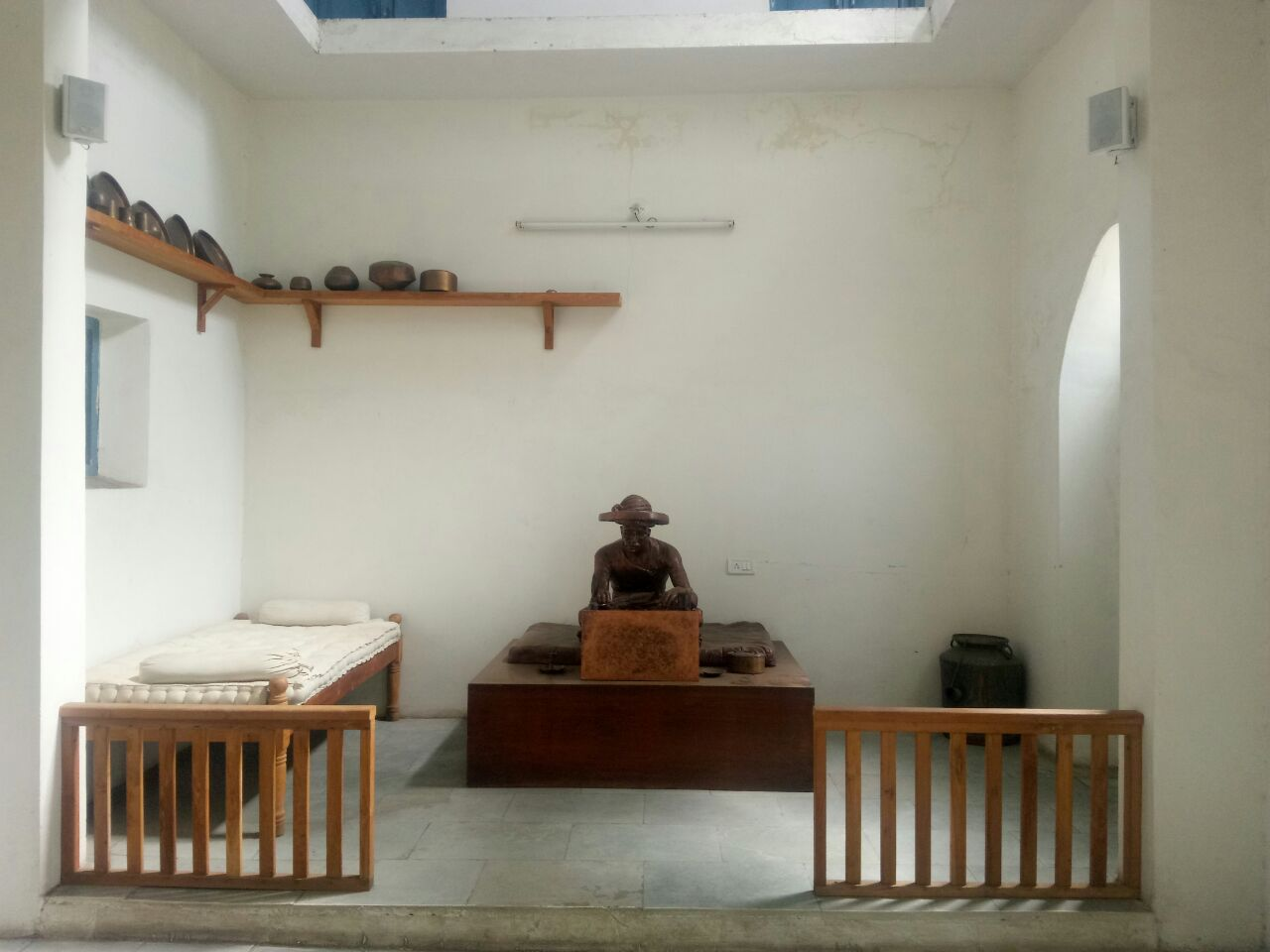
Statue of Narmad at display in museum at Surat

== See also ==
- List of Gujarati-language writers
