= List of Yuva Puraskar winners for Gujarati =

List of winners of a literary honor in India

Part of a series on

Sahitya Akademi Awards
Category
Sahitya Akademi Award winners by language
- Assamese
- Bengali
- Bodo
- Dogri
- English
- Gujarati
- Hindi
- Kannada
- Kashmiri
- Konkani
- Maithili
- Malayalam
- Marathi
- Meitei (Manipuri)
- Nepali
- Odia
- Punjabi
- Rajasthani
- Sanskrit
- Santali
- Sindhi
- Tamil
- Telugu
- Urdu
Sahitya Akademi Translation Prizes
- Assamese
- Bengali
- Bodo
- Dogri
- English
- Gujarati
- Hindi
- Kannada
- Kashmiri
- Konkani
- Maithili
- Malayalam
- Marathi
- Meitei (Manipuri)
- Nepali
- Odia
- Punjabi
- Rajasthani
- Sanskrit
- Santali
- Sindhi
- Tamil
- Telugu
- Urdu
Sahitya Akademi Yuva Puraskar
- Assamese
- Bengali
- Bodo
- Dogri
- English
- Gujarati
- Hindi
- Kannada
- Kashmiri
- Konkani
- Maithili
- Malayalam
- Meitei (Manipuri)
- Marathi
- Nepali
- Odia
- Punjabi
- Rajasthani
- Sanskrit
- Santali
- Sindhi
- Tamil
- Telugu
- Urdu
Sahitya Akademi Bal Sahitya Puraskar
- Assamese
- Bengali
- Bodo
- Dogri
- English
- Gujarati
- Hindi
- Kannada
- Kashmiri
- Konkani
- Maithili
- Malayalam
- Meitei (Manipuri)
- Marathi
- Nepali
- Odia
- Punjabi
- Rajasthani
- Sanskrit
- Santali
- Sindhi
- Tamil
- Telugu
- Urdu
Related
- Eighth Schedule to the Constitution of India
- Official Languages Commission
- List of languages by number of native speakers in India

Yuva Puraskar is given each year to young writers for their outstanding works in the 24 languages, since 2011.

== Recipients ==
Following is the list of recipients of Yuva Puraskar for their works written in Gujarati. The award comprises a cash prize of Rs. 50,000 and an engraved copper plaque.

Year	Author	Work	Genre	References
2011	Dhwanil Parekh	Antim Yuddha	Play	
2012	Jatush Joshi	Pashyantini Pele Paar	Poetry	
2013	Ashok Chavda	Dalkhi Thi Saav Chhutan	Poetry	
2014	Anil Chavda	Savaar Laine	Poetry	
2015	Rajesh Vankar	Maalo	Short stories	
2016	Ankit Trivedi	Gazal Purvak	Poetry	
2017	Raam Mori	Mahotu	Short stories	
2018	Esha Dadawala	Janmaro	Poetry	
2019	Ajay Soni	Retino Manas	Short stories	
2020	Abhimanyu Acharya	Padchhayao Vacche	Short stories	
2021	Drashti Soni	A-Manas	Novel	
2022	Bharat Kheni	Raja Ravi Varma	Biography	
2023	Sagar Shah (declined)	Get Together	Short Stories	
2024	Rinku Rathod	...To Tame Raaji?	Poetry	
2025	Mayur Khavdu	Narsinh Tekari	Essays	

== See also ==
- List of Sahitya Akademi Award winners for Gujarati
- List of Sahitya Akademi Translation Prize winners for Gujarati
