= Anil Chavda =

Indian Gujarati-language Poet (Born: 1985)

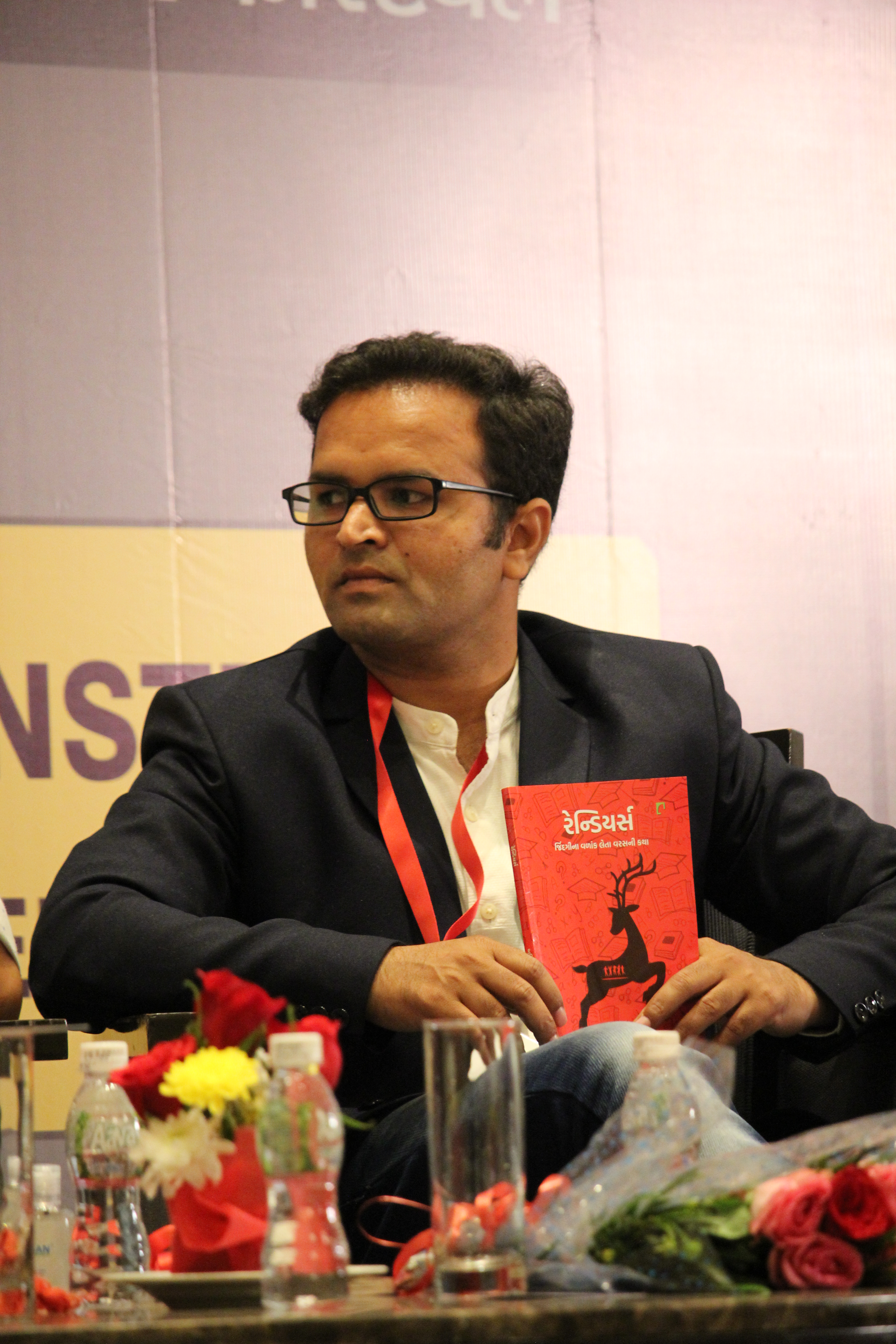
- Anil Chavda At His Book Launch Event
- Born: Anil Premajibhai Chavda; 10 May 1985 (age 41); Karela, Lakhtar, Surendranagar
- Education: Gujarat University
- Occupations: poet, writer, columnist
- Spouse: Ranjan (2011–present)
- Children: Arth
- Writing career
- Language: Gujarati
- Years active: Since 2000
- Genres: ghazal, geet, free Verse
- Notable work: Savaar Laine – 2012
- Notable awards: Takhtasinh Parmar Prize 2012–13; Shayda Award −2010; Yuva Gaurav Award - 2010; Yuva Puraskar – 2014
- Website: Official website

Signature
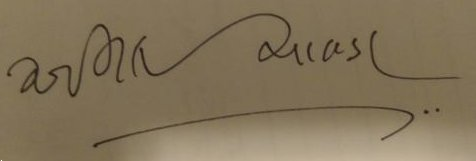

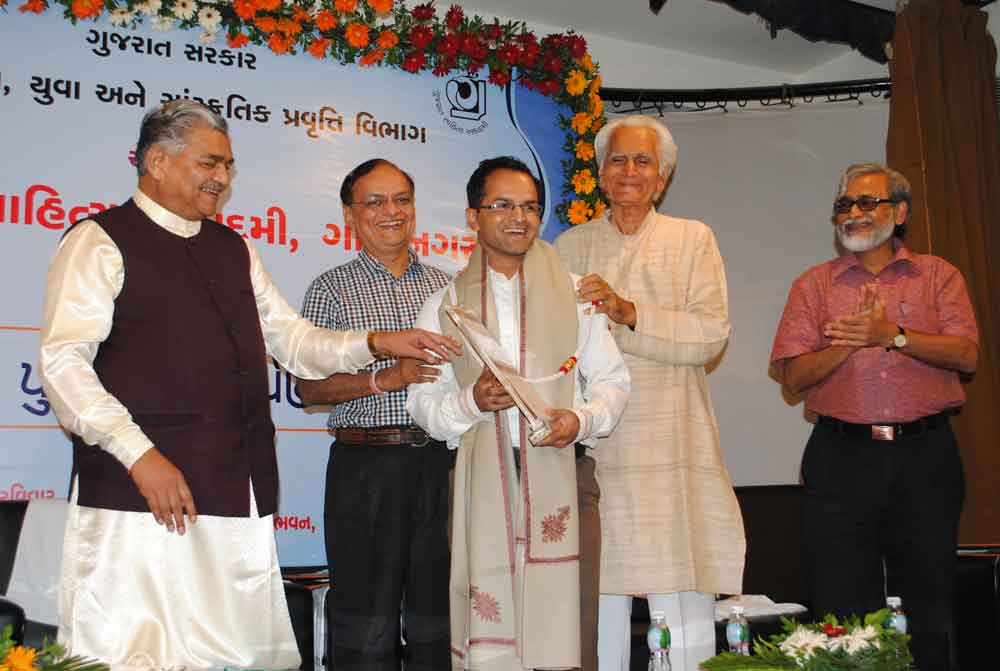
Anil Chavda at Yuva Gaurav Award ceremony

Anil Chavda is a Gujarati language poet, writer and columnist from Gujarat, India.

Some of his works include Savaar Laine (Bringing the Dawn to You) (2012), a collection of ghazals (a poetic form), which won him the 2014 Yuva Puraskar literary award, instituted by the Sahitya Akademi (National Academy of Letters) in Delhi. He is also a recipient of the Shayda Award (2010) (INT-Mumbai), the Yuva Gaurav Puraskar (2013) from the Gujarat Sahitya Akademi and the Ravji Patel Award from the Gujarat Samachar and Samanvay. Along with ghazal, he has worked in other forms of poetry such as Geet (song), Achhandas (free verse poetry) and the sonnet. Ek Hati Vaarta (Once, There Was a Story) is his short-story collection. He has appeared on several television and radio programmes on All India Radio and Doordarshan.

== Early life ==
Anil Chavda was born on 10 May 1985, in Karela (Lakhtar), a village in the Surendranagar district (Gujarat, India), to Premajibhai and Manibahen. He completed his primary education at the Karela Prathamik Shala, Lakhtar in 1999. He completed his Standard 10 in 2000 from the Siddharth High School, Wadhwan, and Standard 12 in 2002 from Navsarjan Highschool, Ahmedabad. He earned his Bachelor of Arts degree (Gujarati literature) in 2005 from H.K. Arts College, Ahmedabad; his Master of Arts degree (Gujarati literature) in 2007 from Saraspur Arts and Commerce College, Ahmedabad; and a Bachelor of Education degree (Gujarati Literature) in 2008 from Chanakya Vidyalay, Ahmedabad. He also qualified for a diploma in journalism in 2009 from Bhavan's College, Ahmedabad. Chavda married Ranjan on 18 February 2011; the couple have a son, Arth.

== Career ==
Chavda began writing poetry during his college years and was influenced by well-known Gujarati language poets including: Chinu Modi, Adil Mansuri, Sitanshu Yashaschandra, and Labhshankar Thakar. His first publication was a ghazal in a Gujarati poetry journal Kavilok in 2004. Subsequently, his writings were published in Gujarati literary magazines such as: Gazalvishw, Dhabak, Parivesh, Shabdasrishti, Kavilok, Kumar, Navneet Samarpan, Parab, Shabdasar and Tadarthya. Since 2007, his ghazals have appeared in Vis Pancha (Twenty into Five), a compilation of ghazals by young Gujarati poets including: Ashok Chavda, Bhavesh Bhatt, Hardwar Goswami and Chandresh Makwana. He has worked as the executing editor of Sanvedana Samaj, a monthly Gujarati magazine since 2014. Every Sunday, The Indian newspaper Sandesh has published his column "Manni Mosam" (in Sanskar) on a regular basis since 2014. Presently, he serves in the advisory board of the Ahmedabad International Literature Festival

== Works ==
On 15 February 2012, he released his first ghazal anthology Savaar Laine (Bringing the Dawn to You), published by Navbharat Sahitya Mandir. It was admired by Gujarati critics and writers including: Raghuvir Chaudhari, Chinu Modi, Chandrakant Sheth, Radheshyam Sharma and Chandrakant Topiwala. In a same year, he also released his short-story collection titled Ek Hati Varata (Once, There was a Story). Critics have noted he has created a poetic language of his own with frustration, sorrow and satire as its basic elements in his ghazals. The language is described as simple, reader-friendly, lucid and full of freshness carrying a natural poetic flow and rhythm not only of the words but of the content as well. He has contributed to the Gujarati Geet (song). The notable aspects of his songs are the fantasy and the quality of their narrations. Chavda has also translated some 19 books in Gujarati. Aameen (2014) is a translation of poems by Alok Shrivastav Chavda translated from Hindi to Gujararti.

In 2022, he published his second collection of ghazals, Ghanu Badhu Che.

== Recognition ==
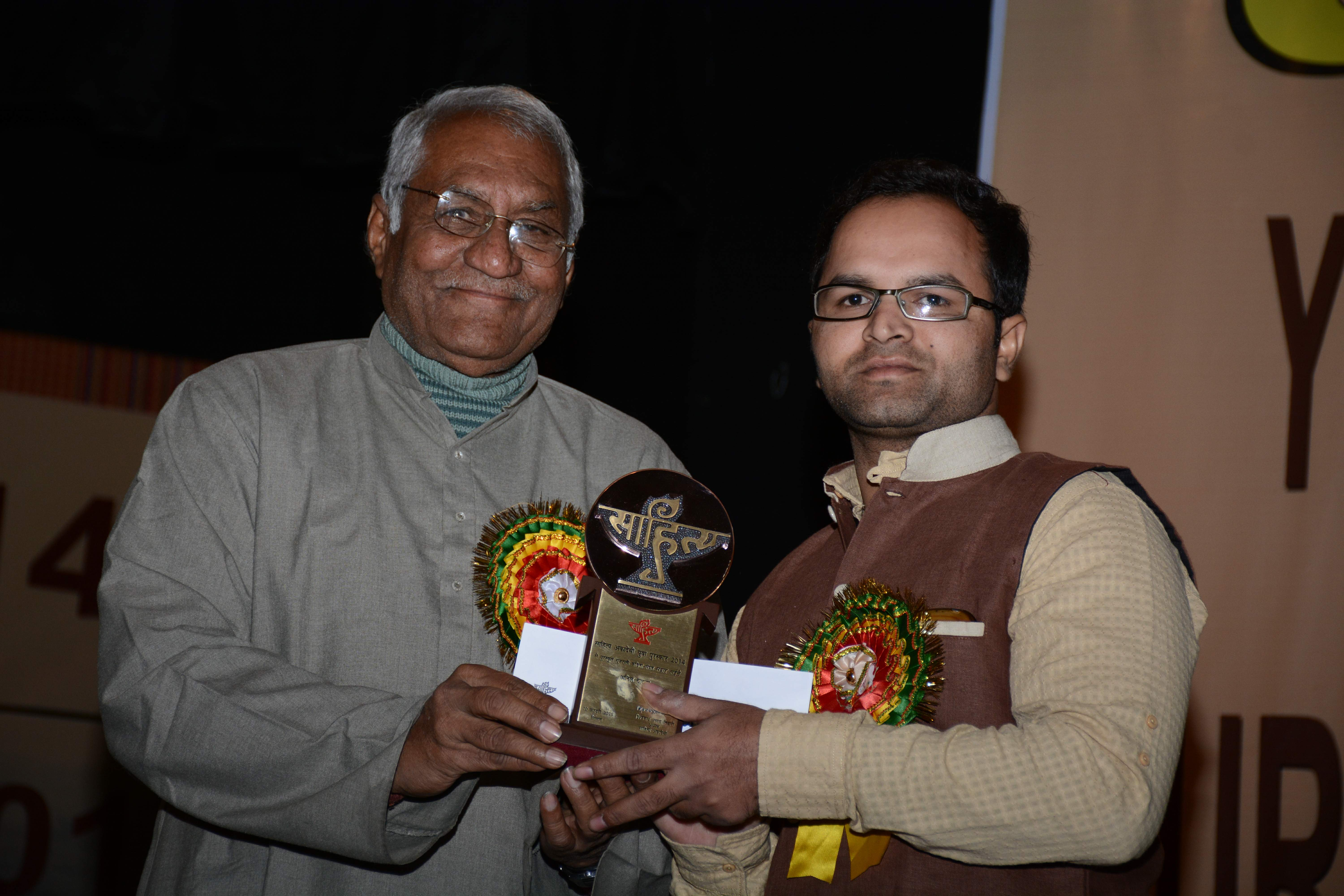
Anil Chavda At New Delhi

In 2010, the Indian National Theater-Mumbai (INT) awarded him the Shayda Award and Gujarat Sahitya Akademi awarded him the Yuva Gaurav Puraskar. He won Takhtasinh Parmar Prize 2012–13 from the Gujarati Sahitya Parishad and the Yuva Puraskar award (2014) from the Sahitya Akademi, Delhi for his book Savaar Laine. He is also a recipient of Ravji Patel Award for 2016 instituted by the Gujarat Samachar and Samanvay.

== Bibliography ==
- Vis Pancha (Twenty Into Five), 2007. (A compilation of ghazals with other four young poets including Ashok Chavda, Bhavesh Bhatt, Hardwar Goswami and Chandresh Makvana.)
- Savaar Laine (Bringing the Dawn to You), 2012. (collection of ghazals)
- Ek Hati Varata (Once, There was a Story), 2012. (short-stories)
- Meaningful Journey, 2013. (essay)
- Ambedakar: Jivan Ane Chintan, 2015. (A biography of Ambedakar)
- Ghanu Badhu Che, 2022. (collection of ghazals)

=== Compilation ===
- Sukh Dukh Mari Drashtie, 2009
- Shabda Sathe Maro Sanbandh (with Harsh Brahmbhatt), 2012
- Prem Vishe (with Harsh Brahmbhatt), 2014. (Articles on Love written by famous poets and writers)
- Aakash Vavanara, 2013. (Experiences of award-winning teachers)
- Aachare Te Aacharya, 2013. (Experiences of award-winning principals)

== See also ==
- List of Gujarati-language writers
