= Rajesh Vankar =

Gujarati poet and writer

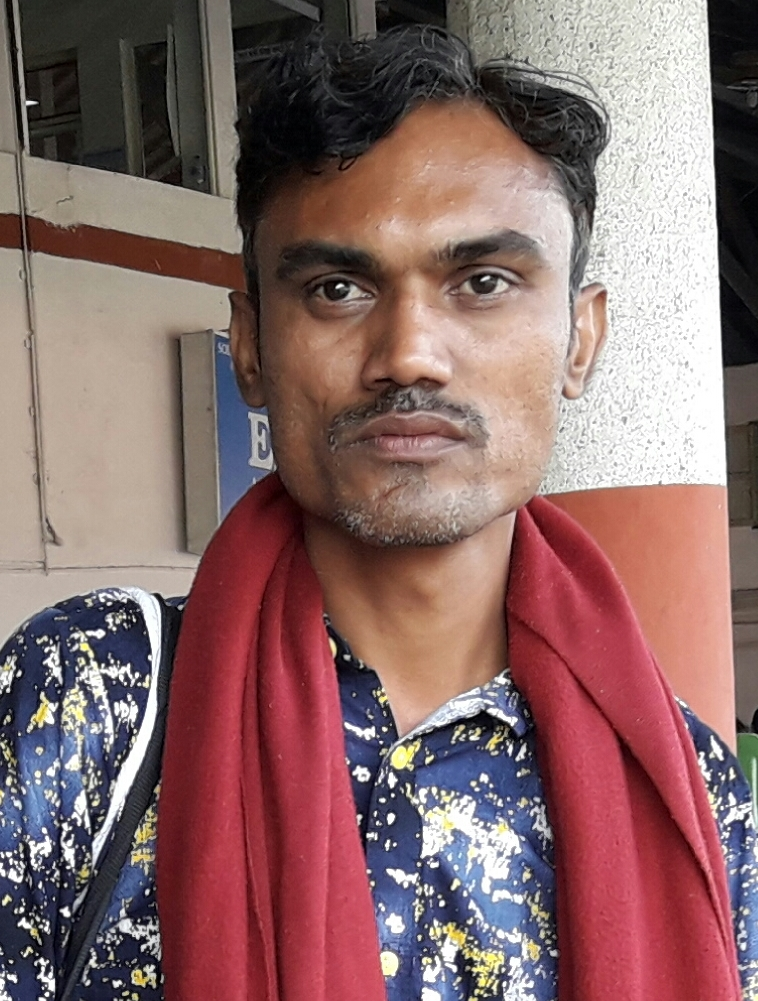
- at Madgaon, Goa - November 2016
- Born: Rajesh Parmabhai Vankar; 4 September 1981 (age 44); Bahi (Shahera), Panchmahal, Gujarat
- Education: Master of Arts; Ph.D.
- Alma mater: Gujarat University; Maharaja Sayajirao University of Baroda
- Occupations: Poet, writer, editor
- Spouse: Hetal (m. 2013)
- Children: Bhargav
- Writing career
- Language: Gujarati
- Years active: 1995 - present
- Period: postmodern Gujarati literature
- Genres: short story, ghazal, Geet, free verse
- Notable works: Gujarati Tunki Vartama Pariveshni Karyasadhakta; Maalo (2009)
- Notable awards: Yuva Puraskar (2015)

Academic background
- Thesis: A study of the function of setting in Gujarati short stories
- Doctoral advisor: Jayesh Bhogayta

Rajesh Vankar is a Gujarati writer from Gujarat, India. He won the Yuva Puraskar of Sahitya Akademi, New Delhi in 2015 for his story collection Maalo. He is currently an editor of Parivesh.

== Early life ==
Rajesh Vankar was born on 4 September 1981 in Bahi, village in Shehra of Panchmahal district. He is native of Rampura Jodka near Godhra, Gujarat. He took his primary education from Prathamik Shala Rampura and Prathamik Shala Jodka. He completed his Std. 12 in 1999 from Shri G.D. Shah and Pandya High School, Mahelol. He started his college from J.L.K. Kotecha and Gardi College, Kankanpur in 2000 but failed in exam of first year. Then, he took admission in Gujarati department of M.S. University and graduated in 2004. He obtained his Ph.D. degrees in 2009 from the same university for his research Gujarati Tunki Vartama Pariveshni Karyasadhakta (Function of Setting in Gujarati short stories). His guide for Ph.D. Degree was Jayesh Bhogayta, a Gujarati writer. In 2012, he earned M.Phil. from Gujarati Department of Mumbai University for his research Vicharti Vimukta Jatini Vartao (Stories of nomadic communities). Vankar married Hetal in 2013, and they have a son, Bhargav.

== Career ==
He has been writing poetry from a young age and was first published at the age of fifteen. In 2003, his short story came out for first time in Tadarthya, a Gujarati language monthly journal. Subsequently, his writing has also been published in Tadarthya, Kavi, Tamanna, Hayati, Dalitchetna, Shabdasrishti, and Tathapi.

He has served as assistant professor at the Government Arts and Science College, Morva (Hadaf) near Godhra since 2015. Before that, he taught at graduate and postgraduate level at M.S. University, Vadodara. He is a member in a committee of Kabir Dalit Sahitya Award since 2012 and also serving as a secretary of Panchmahal Pradesh Yuva Vikas Sanstha.

== Works ==
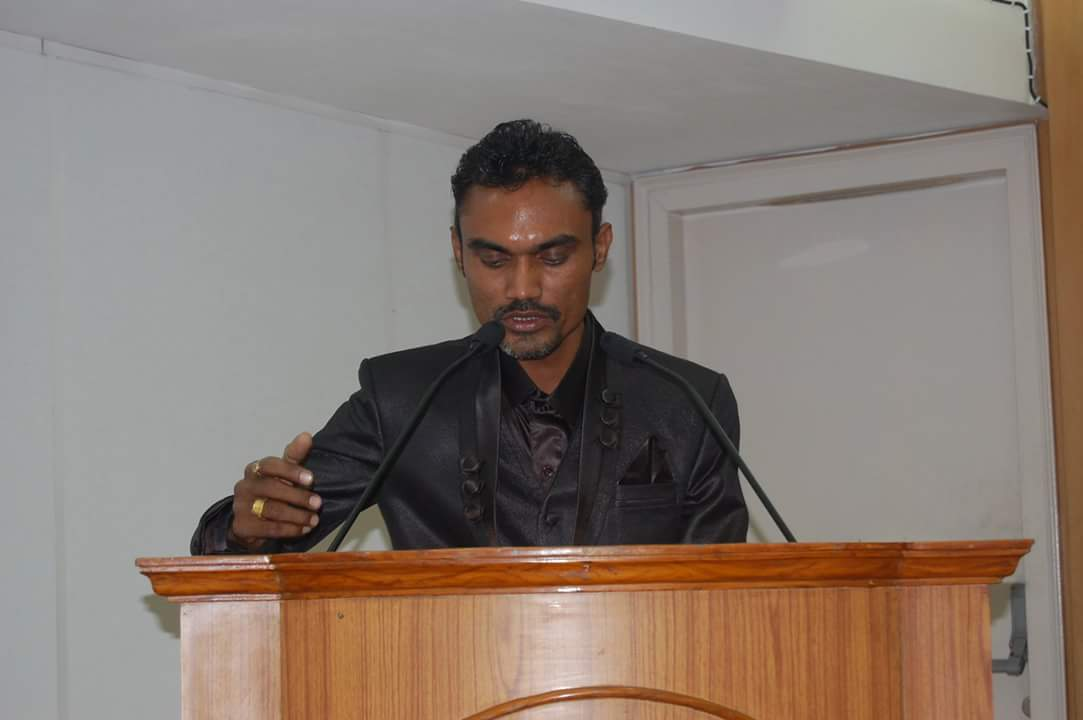
Dr. Rajesh Vankar at Sahitya Akademi Delhi

His works include a collection of poetry, Tarbheto (2009) and a collection of short stories, Malo (2009). Pidapratyayant (2012) and Tunki Vartani Vaat (2021) are works of literary criticism by him.

=== Research ===
- Gujarati Tunki Vartama Pariveshni Karyasadhakta (Ph.D. theses; 2012)
- Dalit Chetna Kendri Tunki Vartama Parivesh (2012)
- Vicharti Vimukta Jatinu Sahitya (M.Phil. theses; 2015)
- Turi Barot Samaajno Abhyas

=== Compilation ===
- Kalapina Kavyono Aswad (2014)
- Navi Dharti Navo Mol (Poems of contemporary new poets)

== Recognition ==
His research work Gujarati Tunki Vartama Pariveshni Karyasadhakta (Function of setting in Gujarati Short Stories) has won The Best Book Prize (2012) instituted by Gujarat Sahitya Akademi. In 2015, he was awarded Yuva Puraskar by Sahitya Akademi, New Delhi for his short story collection Maalo.

== See also ==
- List of Gujarati-language writers
