= Hardwar Goswami =

Gujarati writer (born 1976)

- Born: Hardwar Manrupgiri Goswami; 18 July 1976 (age 50); Talaja, Bhavnagar, Gujarat, India
- Education: Bhavnagar University (M.A.); Gujarat Vidyapith (M.Phil.)
- Occupations: poet, writer, playwright
- Spouse: Kruti Hardwar Goswami
- Children: Shabd Hardwar Goswami
- Writing career
- Language: Gujarati
- Years active: 1994 – present
- Genres: ghazal, geet, free verse
- Notable work: Hawa Ne Kinare (2005)
- Notable awards: Yuva Gaurav Award (2009)

Hardwar Goswami (Gujarati: હરદ્વાર ગોસ્વામી) is a Gujarati language poet, writer, and playwright from Gujarat, India. He wrote the poetry collection Hawa Ne Kinare (2005), and his poems have been published in several Gujarati magazines. He won the Yuva Gaurav Award in 2009 for his contributions to Gujarati poetry.

== Early life ==
Goswami was born on 18 July 1976 in Talaja, a taluqa of Bhavnagar district, to Manrupgiri Goswami and Charulata Goswami. He finished his primary education in 1990 from Talaja Taluqa Prathamik Shala and completed Std. 12 in 1995 from M.J. Doshi High School, Talaja. He received a Bachelor of Arts in 1998 from Samaldas Arts College, Bhavnagar University, and a Master of Arts in 2000 from Gujarati Bhasha Sahitya Bhavan, Bhavnagar University, with Gujarati literature as one of his subjects. He earned his M.Phil. in 2002 from Gujarat Vidyapith under Usha Upadhyay. His thesis for his M.Phil. was 3 Ghazalkaro: Ek Abhyas, a study on the works of three major Gujarati ghazal poets: Mareez, Rajendra Shukla and Manhar Modi.

== Career ==
Goswami started to write during his school days and was first published in Kavilok when he was studying in Std. 11. Subsequently, he published in other Gujarati literary magazines including Kumar, Shabdasrishti, Gazalvishwa, Dhabak, Tadarthya, Navneet Samarpan and Kavita. He started his career as a lecturer on Gujarati literature at Gujarat College, Ahmedabad, in 2000. Later, he served as a lecturer at M.P. Arts & M.H. Commerce College and S.L.U. College of Ahmedabad. Since 2013 he has been a full-time poet and playwright.

== Works ==
Hawa Ne Kinare, a collection of his ghazals, was published in 2005. In 2007, his ghazals were published in Vis Pancha (twenty into five), a collection of ghazals written by young poets, including Anil Chavda, Ashok Chavda, Bhavesh Bhatt and Chandresh Makwana. His works for children include Laalmahel and Hamshakal.

== Recognition ==
Gujarat Sahitya Akademi awarded him the Yuva Gaurav Award of 2009 for his work Hawa Ne Kinare (2005). He is also a recipient of the Batubhai Umarvadiya Prize of 1995. In 2011, he was sent to China as a young poet by Sahitya Akademi, New Delhi.

== See also ==
- List of Gujarati-language writers
