= Ashok Chavda =

Gujarati poet and writer (born 1978)

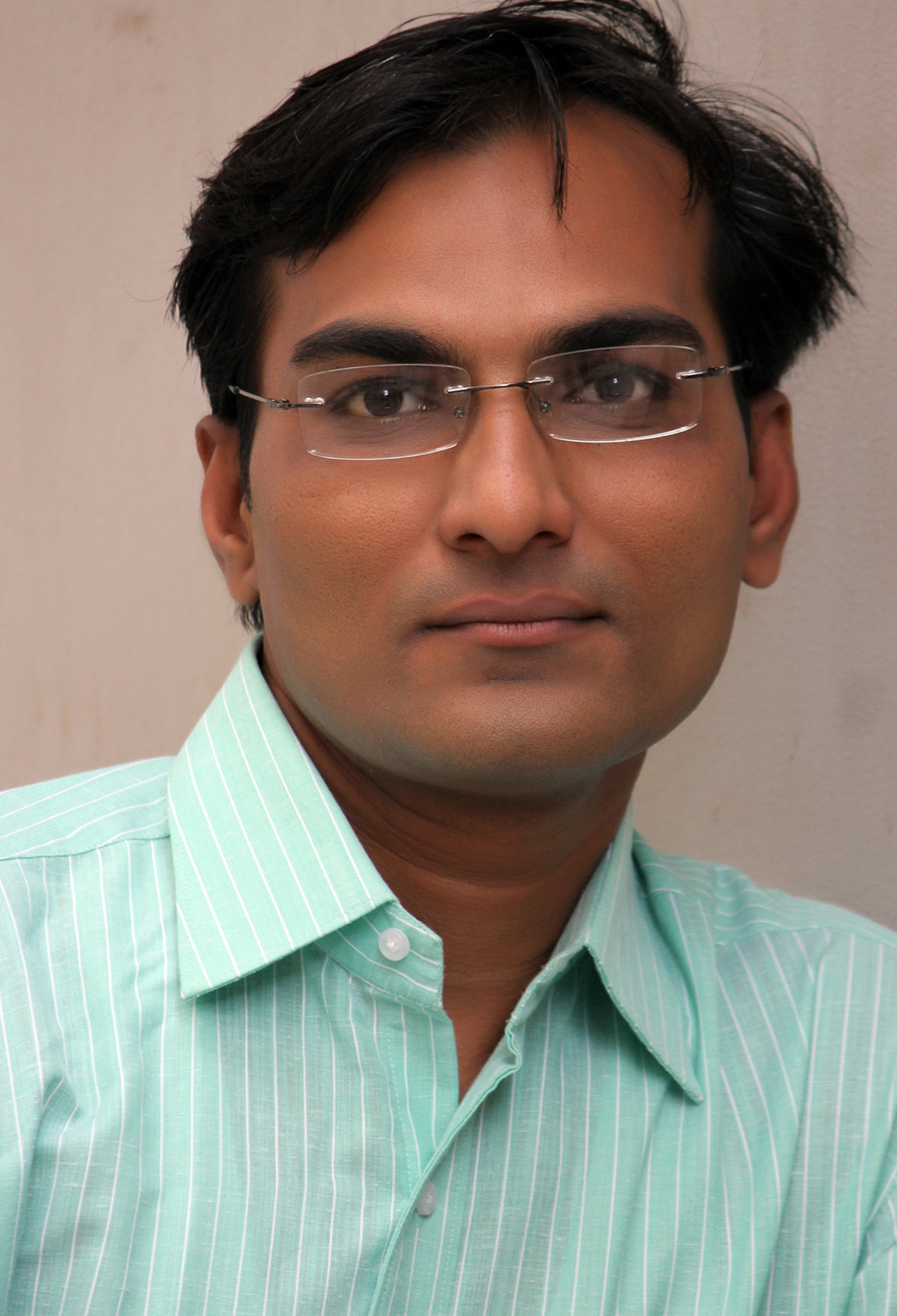
- Chavda in 2012
- Born: 23 August 1978 (age 48); Bhavnagar, Gujarat, India
- Education: B.com., B.A., M.D.C,. Ph.D.Gujarat University; LL.B. Saurashtra University; M.A. Gujarat Vidyapith
- Occupations: Poet, Writer, Critic, Translator, Researcher, Lyricist
- Spouse: Madhu Chavda (2004-present)
- Children: Maitree Chavda (Daughter), Harshil Chavda (Son)
- Writing career
- Pen name: Bedil
- Language: Gujarati
- Years active: 1995- present
- Subjects: Accountancy, English, Mass Communication, Mass Media, Law, Social Science
- Notable work: Dalkhi Thi Saav Chhutan (2012)
- Notable awards: Yuva Gaurav Puraskar (2012); Yuva Puraskar (2013); Best Book Prize, Poetry, Ghazals, Pagrav Talaavma (2012); Best Book Prize, Humorous Poetry, Pityo Ashko (2012); Dasi Jiwan Award (2014); Ravji Patel Award (2016); Best Translator (2021); Best Lyricist (2023)

Academic background
- Thesis: Growth and Development of Gujarati Dalit Periodicals
- Doctoral advisor: Chandrakant Mehta

Signature
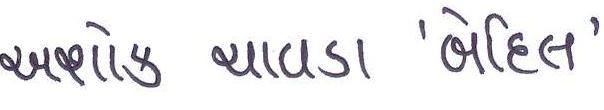

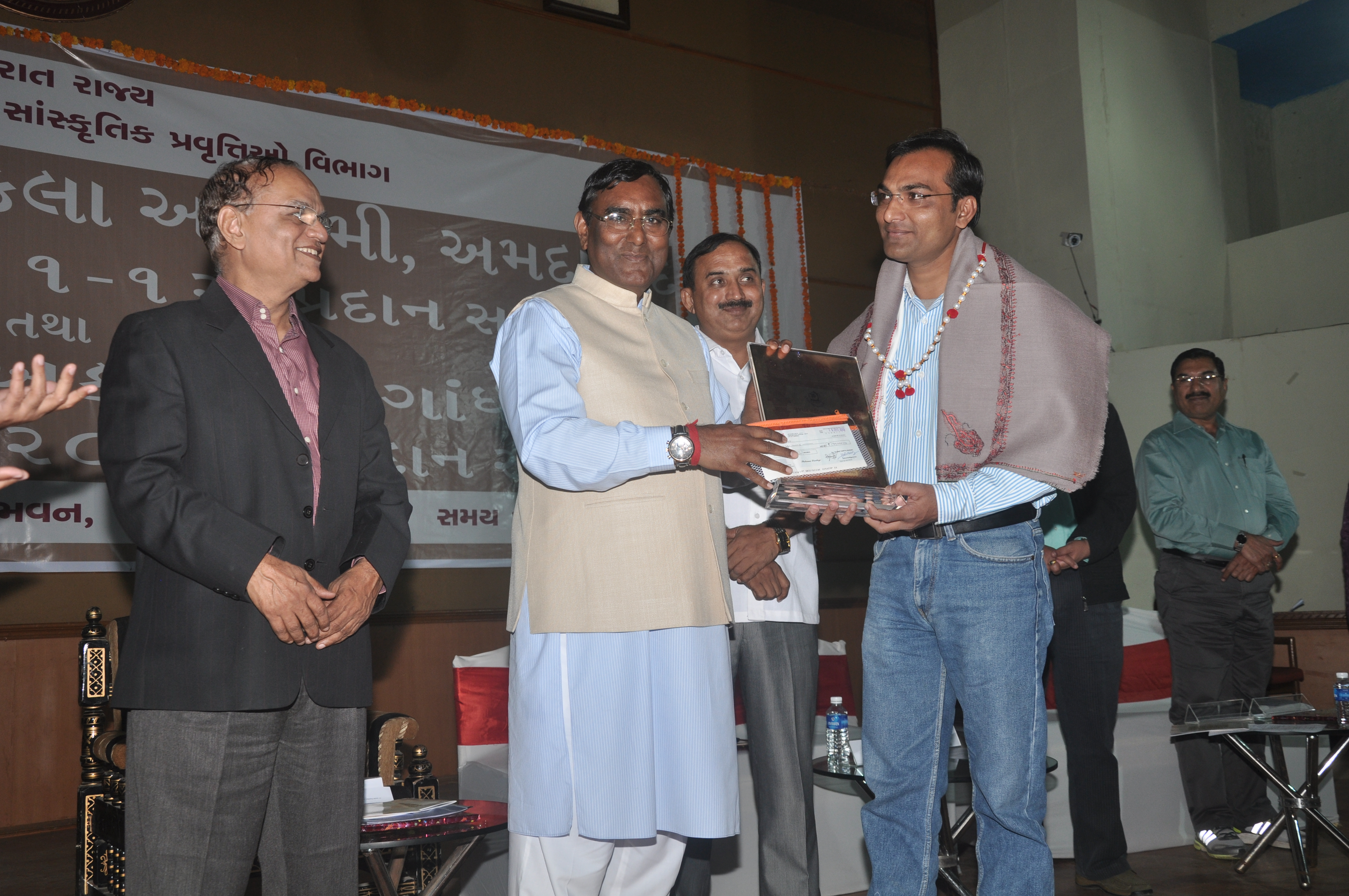
Chavda in Ahmedabad for the Yuva Gaurav Puraskar ceremony (2012)

Ashok Chavda (born 23 August 1978), also known by his pen name Bedil, is a Gujarati poet, writer and critic from Gujarat, India. His anthology of poetry, Dalkhi Thi Saav Chhutan (2012), was awarded the Yuva Puraskar by the Sahitya Akademi in 2013. His collection of known writings include Pagla Talaavma (2003), Pagarav Talaavma (2012), Tu Kahu Ke Tame (2012), Pityo Ashko (2012), Shabdoday (2012), and Ghazalistan (2012), which is a translation of Urdu ghazals written by Indian and Pakistani poets. He is also a recipient of the Yuva Gaurav Award (2012) from the Gujarat Sahitya Akademi, and the Dasi Jivan Award (2013–14) from the Government of Gujarat. He has appeared in several TV and radio programs on All India Radio and Doordarshan.

== Early life and education ==
H. K. Arts College of Ahmedabad

Ashok Chavda was born on 23 August 1978, in Bhavnagar, Gujarat to Pitambarbhai and Hansabahen.

In 1998, Chavda received a Bachelor of Commerce in accounting from C.U. Shah Commerce College of Ahmedabad. In 2001, he received a Bachelor of Arts in English literature from H.K. Arts College of Ahmedabad. In 2003, he received a Master of Development Communication (MDC) from Gujarat University. His research for the MDC was titled Gujarati Dalit Kavitano Udabhav Ane Vikas: 1975-85 (Growth and Development of Gujarati Dalit Poetry: 1975–85).

He stayed at Gujarat University to receive his Ph.D. in Journalism and Mass Media, under Chandrakant Mehta, for his research titled Gujarati Dalit Samayik Patrakaratva Ni Vikasyatra (Growth and Development of Gujarati Dalit Periodicals). He passed the National Eligibility Test (UGC NET) in Mass Communication and Journalism in 2012. He then completed his Bachelor of Laws at K.P. Shah Law College, Jamnagar in 2014 and also received a Master's degree in Gandhian Thought and Social Science from Gujarat Vidyapith in 2016. He also created and edited the magazine Pamaraat in college.

== Career ==
Chavda started his career as a personal tutor at Saraswati Study Center in 1995. He then served as a co-editor of the magazines Kavilok (2003–04), Kumar (2004–06) and Uddesh (2007–08). He was a guest lecturer at the Department of Communication and Journalism, Gujarat University, the Sardar Patel Institution of Public Administration (SPIPA) and other educational institutions in Ahmedabad. In 2008, he joined Gujarat Ayurveda University as an information officer and later worked there as an assistant registrar. Currently, he is working at Gujarat Ayurveda University of Jamnagar as a Deputy registrar.

== Literary career ==
Chavda began writing during his school days in 1993. In July 1997, he joined the poetry workshop Budh Sabha where he met other Gujarati poets including Nalin Pandya, Barin Mehta, Pravin Pandya and Labhshankar Thakar. In 1998, he published his first poem in the magazine Kavilok. Chavda would then publish poems in other Gujarati magazines such as Kavita, Kumar, Shabdasrishti, Gazalvishwa, Uddesh, Navneet Samarpan, Tadarthya, Dhabak, Parab and Dalitchetna. In 2007, his ghazals appeared in Vis Pancha, a compilation of ghazals by young Gujarati poets which included Anil Chavda, Bhavesh Bhatt, Hardwar Goswami and Chandresh Makvana.

Chavda has served on the Directional Committee of Gujarat Lekhak Mandal (Writer's Association of Gujarat), and is currently on the advisory board of Gujarati Language at Sahitya Akademi in New Delhi and the executive committee of Gujarat Dalit Sahitya Pratishthan.

In March 2013, he was invited by Sahitya Akademi to give a lecture on Why do I write.

In April 2019, he was invited by Vishwa Hindi Parishad to give a lecture at International Seminar on "Gandhi: Bahu Aayami Vyaktitva".

== Works ==
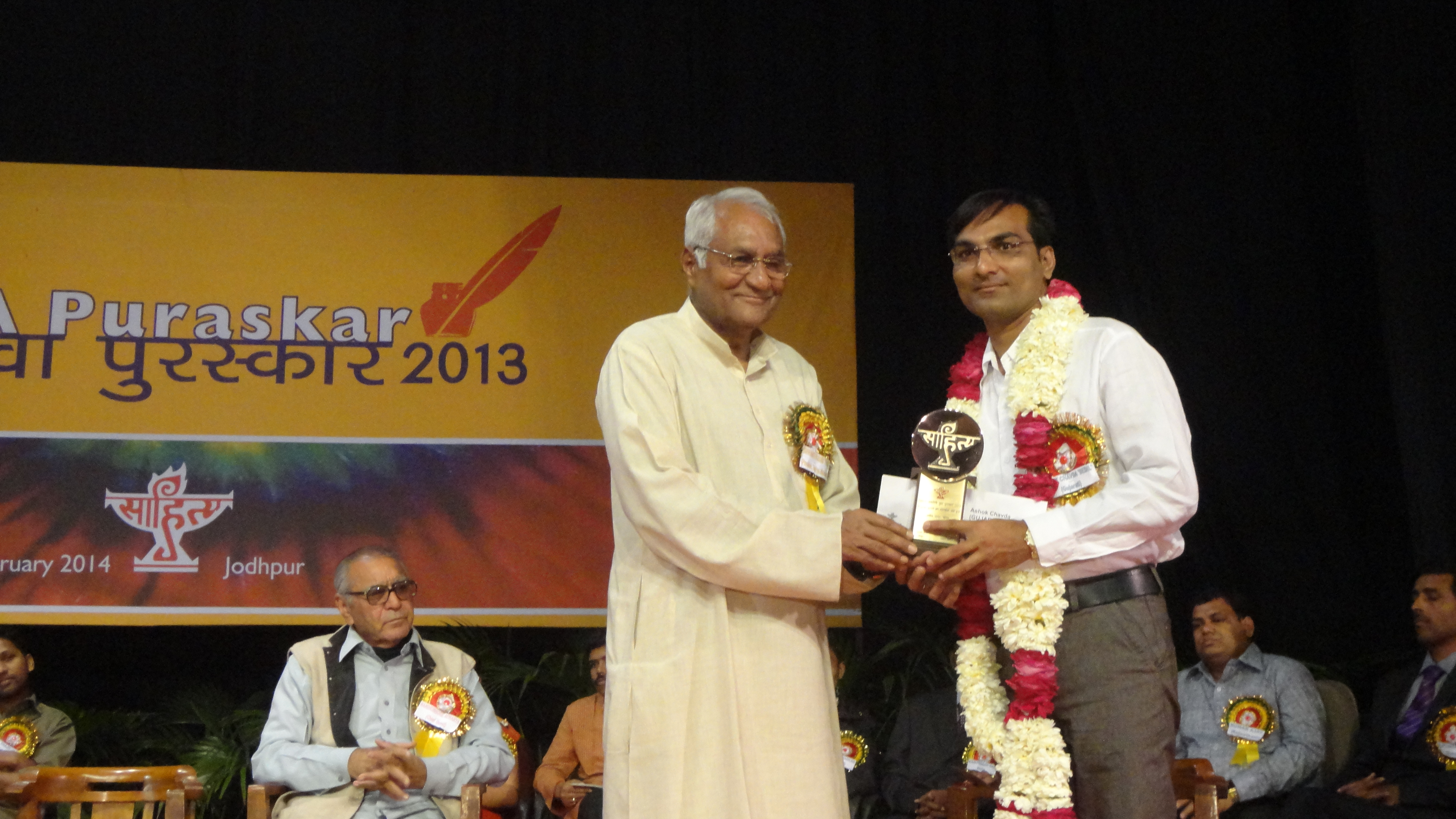
Ashok Chavda at Sahitya Akademi, New Delhi on the event of Yuva Puraskar (2013)

Chavda published his first ghazal collection, Pagla Talaavm, in 2003, followed by Pagrav Talaavma in 2012, which was critically acclaimed by Chinu Modi, Rajesh Vyas 'Miskin' and Ramesh Parekh.

In 2012, he published Dalkhi Thi Saav Chhutan, which is a collection of postmodern Gujarati poetry. That same year, he also published Pityo Ashko, which is a collection of humorous poetry he wrote during his college days. A lyrical poem from Pityo Ashko, titled Millennium Radha nu Geet, was originally published in Kavita (September 1999) by Suresh Dalal.

Tu Kahu Ke Tame (2012) is a collection of lyrical poems by Chavda. He has also written motivational books, one-act plays on social issues and documentaries. Recently, he penned the lyrics for the Gujarati film Paghadi.

Shabdoday (2012), a collection of 25 critical essays and seven book reviews, was critically acclaimed by Dhiru Parikh, a Gujarati writer and former president of the Gujarati Sahitya Parishad.

He compiled Concise Dictionary of Practical Verbs (2012). He translated This Ancient Lyre (2005), Malayalam poet O. N. V. Kurup's collection of poems edited by A. J. Thomas, into Gujarati as Aa Prachin Vadya (2020).

== Awards and recognition ==
"There is a clear combination of linguistic art and simplified meter in lyrics and poetry of Ashok Chavda. His creations are committed up to some extent. He is not the creator of Dalit Literature, but through his poetry, he has finely addressed revolutionary social change and has soulfully presented the ‘poemism’ while addressing the same. In his words "Mane Bahu Kaljipoorvak Nagarni Bahar Rakhyo Chhe" (I was carefully kept away from the city), the poet presents piercing pragmatism through his creations."

— Rajendra Patel

Chavda received the Yuva Gaurav Award (2012) and the Dasi Jivan Award (2013–14), awarded by Gujarat Sahitya Akademi and the Government of Gujarat.

His book Dalkhi Thi Saav Chhutan was awarded the Yuva Puraskar (2013) by Sahitya Akademi.

In 2014, he received the Vishesh Sanman from the South Gujarat Professor's Association. His books Pityo Ashko and Pagrav Talaavma were awarded the Best Book Prize (2012) in the Humorous and Poetry section by Gujarat Sahitya Akademi.

In 2016, he received the Ravji Patel Yuva Pratibha Award.

In 2017, he was invited by the president of India to the Writers Residence Program at Rashtrapati Bhavan. He was so impressed with the stress laid on time management at Rashtrapati Bhavan that he says that in his 15 days’ stay there, he planned out his work for the next 15 years.

In 2019, he received the Gujarat Tourism Best Lyricist Award for Gujarati Film KUTUMB.

In 2023, His translated work This Ancient Lyre (2005), Malayalam poet O. N. V. Kurup's collection of poems edited by A. J. Thomas, into Gujarati as Aa Prachin Vadya (2020) received Best Translation Award-2021 by Gujarat Sahitya Akademi, Gandhinagar.

In 2026, he received the Gujarat Film Best Lyricist Award-2023 for Gujarati Film SAMBANDHO MA KHALI JAGA.

== Lyricist ==
In addition to the valuable contributions to the Gujarati literature, he is one of the leading lyricists in Gujarati film industry. His works as a lyricist are as under:

Paaghadi (2018, Best Lyricist, GIFA Nominated, Transmedia Nominated)

Jigarjaan (2019)

Kutumb (2019, Best Lyricist, Won)

Shu Tame Kunvara Chho (2022)

Sambandho Ma Khali Jagya (2023, Best Lyricist, Won)

Bubbly Bindas (2024)

== Personal life ==
Chavda's family is native to Mandasar, a village near Than-Chotila in the Surendranagar district. On 14 December 2004, Chavda married his wife Madhu Chavda and they have a daughter and son; Maitree Chavda (Miss Gujarat-2026) and Harshil Chavda.

== See also ==
- List of Gujarati-language writers
