= Mercy Margaret =

Indian poet, writer, social worker (born 1983)

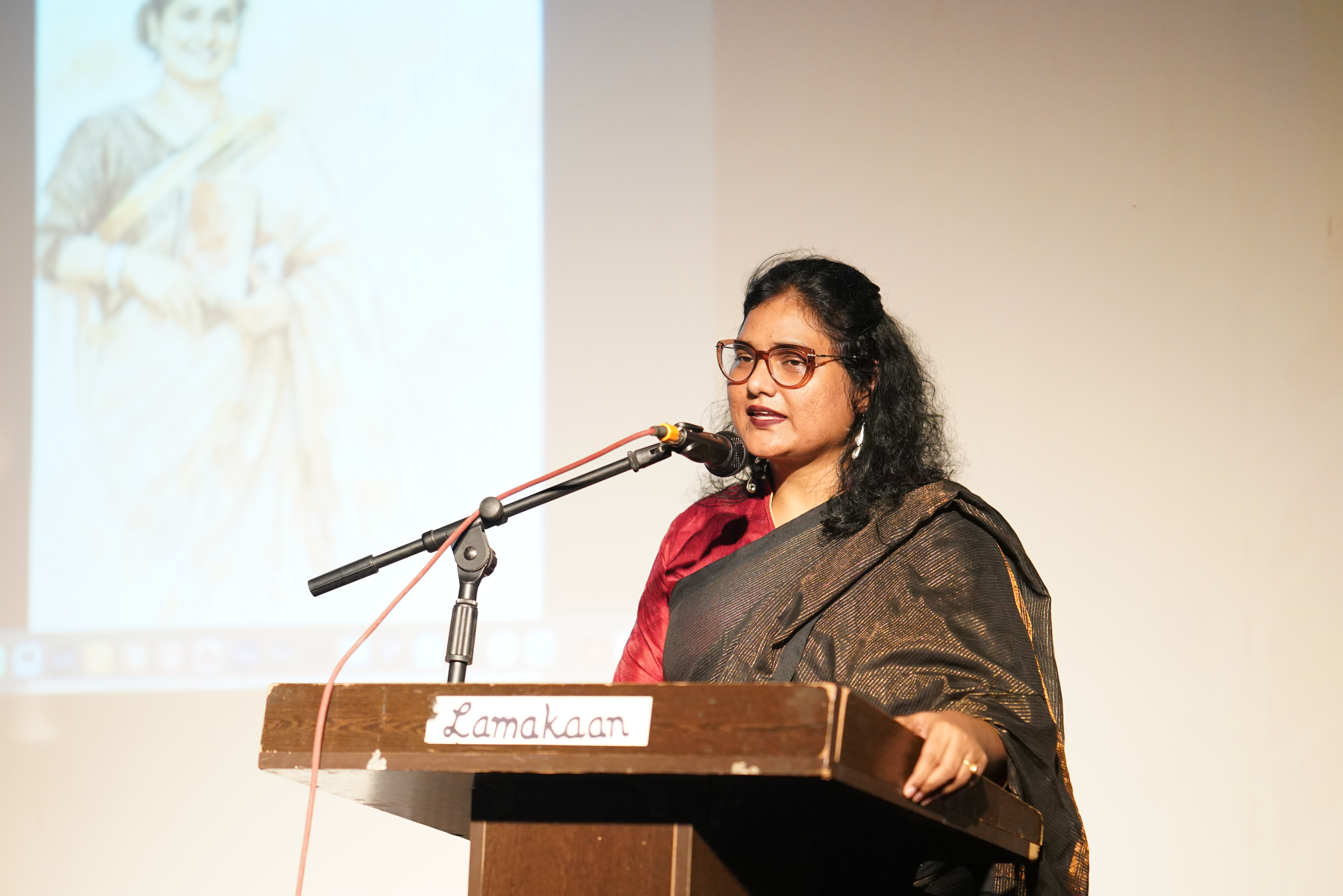
- Born: Mercy Margaret Boda; 23 August 1983 (age 43); Hyderabad (Undivided Andhra Pradesh)
- Education: B.Com. (Osmania), M.Com. (Osmania), M.B.A. (Osmania)
- Alma mater: Sardar Patel College, Secunderabad, Dr. B. R. Ambedkar Institute of Management and Technology, Hyderabad
- Occupation: Lecturer
- Writing career
- Language: Telugu
- Genre: Dalit literature
- Subjects: Poetry, Short stories
- Notable works: Matala Madugu (2015); Kaalam Valiipotunna Vaipu (2019); Dear Zindagi (2022); Uchchala Jaladhi Taranga (2024); Yuddha Kaalapu Shoka Geetam (2025)
- Notable awards: Chamspandana Sahithya Award (2016); Penna Sahithya Award (2016); Sahitya Akademi Yuva Puraskar (2017); Prathibha Puraskaram from Potti Sreeramulu Telugu University for Book-Kaalam Vaalipotunna Vaipu (2022)
- Literary movement: Humanist

Mercy Margaret is a poet, short story writer and a social worker from Hyderabad, India. She emerged as a poet through her poems published on Facebook and became famous after receiving the Kendra Sahitya Akademi Yuva Puraskar Award for her first Telugu poetry book "Matala Madugu" in 2017.

== Awards and achievements ==
She won the first prize in the state level poetry competition conducted by Andhra Pradesh AIDS Control Society. She also won the monthly award for poetry from Sahiti Prasthanam. She received Penna Sahitya Puraskar in 2015. She was awarded "Kendra Sahitya Akademi Yuva Puraskar" in 2017 for her Poetry anthology Maatala Madugu "మాటల మడుగు".

== Bibliography ==
Poetry compilations

- Matala Madugu మాటల మడుగు (2015)
- Kalam Valipotunna vaipu కాలం వాలిపోతున్న వైపు (2019)
- Dear Zindagi డియర్ జిందగీ (2022)
- Uchchala Jaladhi Taranga ఉఛ్చాల జలధి తరంగ (2024)
- Yuddha Kaalapu Shoka Geetam యుద్ధ కాలపు శోక గీతం (2025)

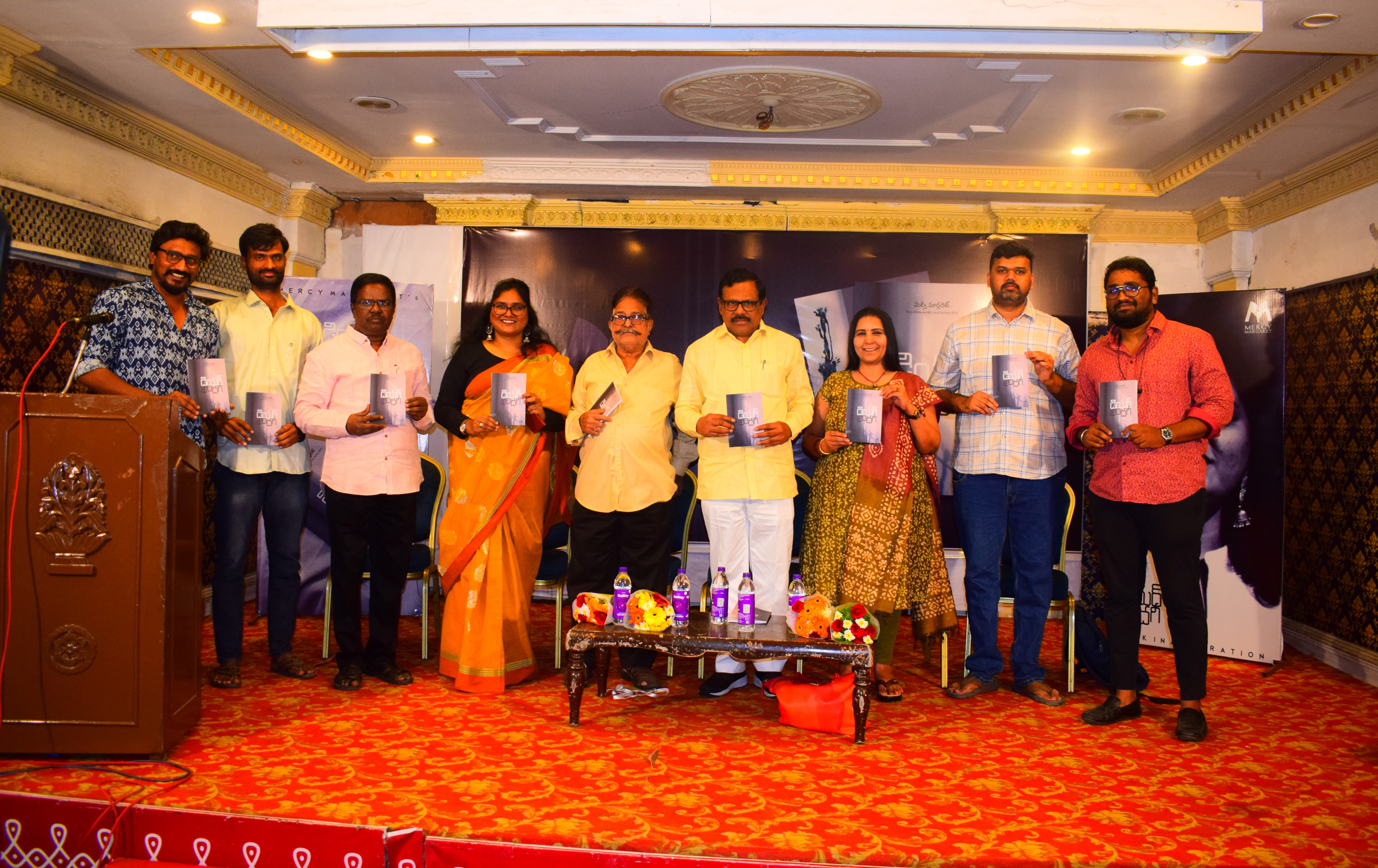
Dear Zindagi Book launch function Photo by Ranjithpasha

Short stories

- "Sunnaalu" సున్నాలు , published in Kotta Katha (2017)
- "Mattayi 5:11" మత్తయి 5:11, published in Kotta Katha (2019)
- "What religion is Darkness", published in Saranga web magazine
- "Natural" సహజ. This story won the Best Story award from the Vanguri Foundation in the United States, in the category of New Story writers.

Drama

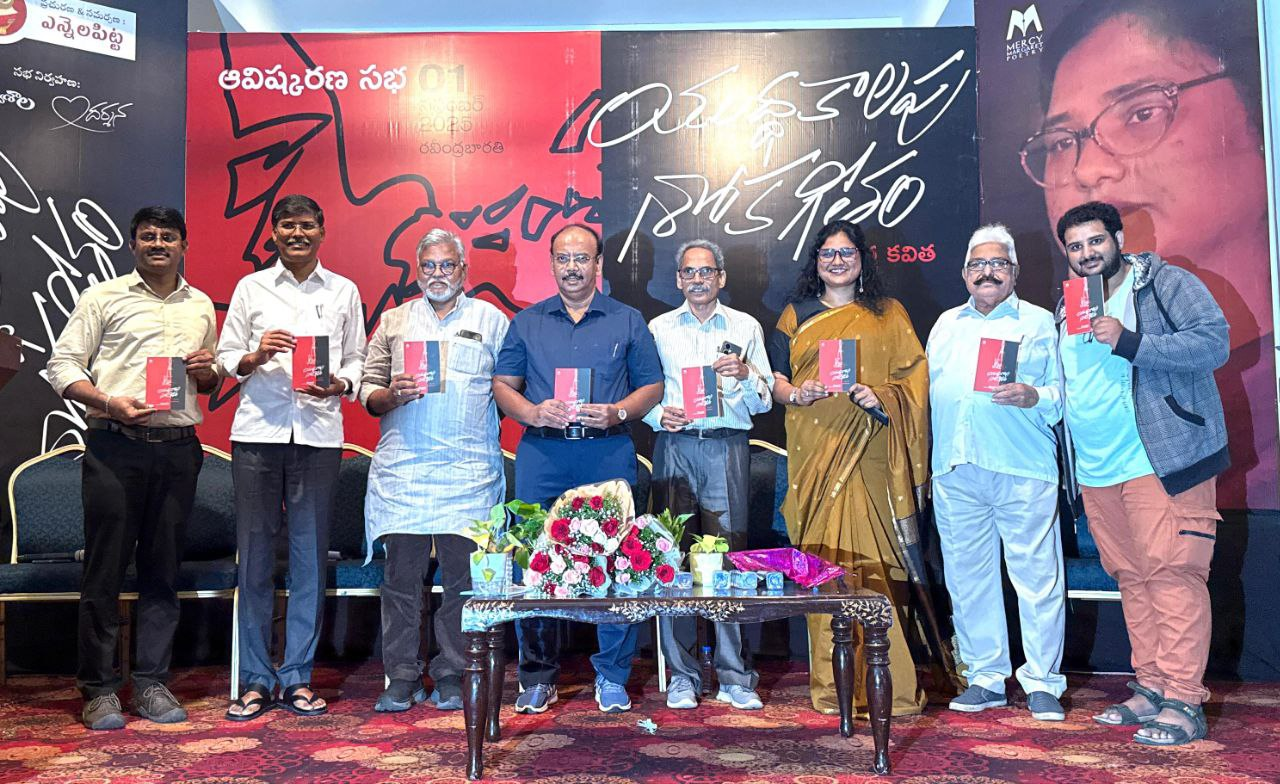
Yuddha Kaalapu Shoka Geetham book launch function Photo

- Asamarthudu
- Thripura Shapatham

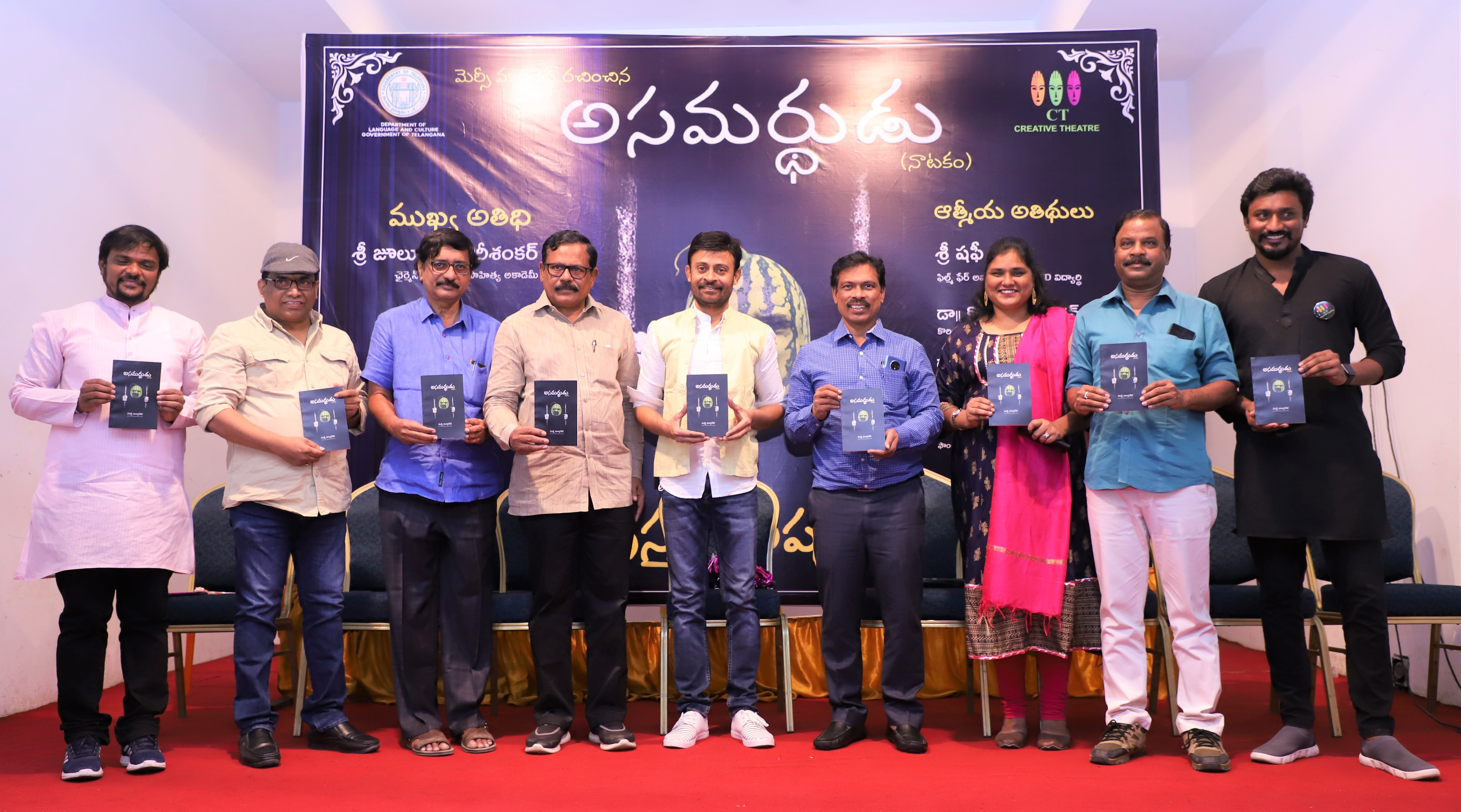
Mercy Margaret's Asamarthudu Book Launch
