= Esha Dadawala =

Gujarati Poet

- Born: Esha Mayank Dadawala; 2 January 1985 (age 41); Surat, Gujarat
- Education: Veer Narmad South Gujarat University
- Occupations: Poet, journalist
- Writing career
- Language: Gujarati
- Years active: 2002 - present
- Genres: Free verse, geet
- Notable works: Vartaro (2008); Janmaro (2013)
- Notable awards: Yuva Gaurav Award (2013); Yuva Puraskar (2018)

Esha Dadawala is a Gujarati language poet and journalist from Gujarat, India. Her significant works include Vartaro (2008), Kya Gai Ae Chhokri (2011) and Janmaro (2013). She has won Yuva Gaurav Award of 2013 for her contribution in Gujarati literature.

== Early life ==
Esha was born on 2 January 1985 in Surat, Gujarat to Mayank Dadawala and Hetal Dadawala. She completed her schooling in 2002 from Jivan Bharati High School, Surat. She got her Bachelor of Arts in 2005 from Veer Narmad South Gujarat University.

== Career ==
Esha wrote her first poem, Death Certificate which was published in Kavita, a Gujarati poetry journal when she was in school. Currently she is owner and Editor of Ananya City (a pioneer of Video E-paper) and Columnist of Divya Bhaskar. She has worked as a news reader, journalist and sub-editor in different media including Gujarat Mitra, MY TV (A local news channel of Surat), Dhabakar (A local newspaper of Surat), Sandesh, MY FM and Gujarat Guardian. Her short stories are published in several Gujarati magazines including Chitralekha.

== Works ==
Vartaro, her first anthology of poems, was published in 2008, followed by Janmaro (2013). She has narrated subtle emotions of women and different phases of the life of a woman. Kya Gai Ae Chhokri (2011) is novel written by her in a diary-form.

== Recognition ==
Gujarat Sahitya Akademi conferred the Yuva Gaurav Award in 2013 for her contribution in Gujarati literature. Her book Janmaro (2013) received Best Book Prize for poetry instituted by Gujarat Sahitya Akademi. She is also recipient of Ravji Patel Award instituted by Gujarat Samachar and Samanvay; Kavi Gani Dahiwala Prize (2000); Best Poet Award by Coffee-mates, Mumbai; Best poet award (2005) by Kala Gurjari Sanstha, Mumbai; Best Poet of Surat Award (2009) by Rashtriya Kala Kendra, Surat. In 2018, she received Yuva Puraskar for her book Janmaro.

== See also ==
- List of Gujarati-language writers
