= Ravindra Parekh =

Ravindra Parekh is a Gujarati short story writer, novelist, playwright, poet, critic and translator from Gujarat, India.

== Life ==
Ravindra Parekh was born on 21 November 1946 in Kalwada village (now in Valsad district, Gujarat) to Ambaben and Maganlal Parekh. He studied in Surat. He studied for a BSc in Chemistry and Physics in 1969, a BA in Gujarati and Psychology in 1977, and an MA in Gujarati and Hindi as well as an LL.B. in 1979 from Veer Narmad South Gujarat University. He worked with Union Bank of India before retiring. He served as vice-chairman of Gujarati Sahitya Parishad.

== Works ==
Ravindra Parekh is a writer whose short story collections include: Swapnavato (1986), Sandhikal (1994) and Paryay (2002). Swapnavato was awarded the Umashankar Joshi Prize while Paryay won the Saroj Pathak Memorial Prize.

Jaldurg (1984) was his first novel which was a suspense story dealing with the psychological view of a relationship between a man and a woman. Atikram (1989) was first serialized in Kadambari magazine and later as a book. His other two novels, Crosswire and Lathukam (1998) were serialized in Gujaratmitra daily. Lathukam is based on his unpublished radio play. His next novel Man Pravesh was published in 2008.

His one-act play collections Ghar Vagarna Dwar (1993) and Hu Tamaro Hu Chhu (2003) were awarded by Gujarat Sahitya Akademi. They also contain children's plays.

His first poetry collection E To Ravindra Chhe (2003) contains only ghazals. Harisamvad (2003) has devotional songs. Saral (2007) is made up of forty songs and sixty ghazals.

Hasya Parishadma Jata (2003) is a collection of humorous essays. Anyokti (2003), Nishpati (2004) and Sammiti (2005) are his works of criticism.

He has translated Laxman Gaikwad’s autobiography Uchalaya from Marathi to Gujarati as Uthaugeer. Deshvidesh (2003) is a collection of translations of short stories from India and abroad. He adapted Mahesh Elkunchwar’s play Vada Chirebandi in Gujarati as Tirade Futi Kumpal. He has edited Gujarati Navlikachayan (1997) published by Gujarati Sahitya Parishad.

== Personal life ==
He married Pushpa S. Kavatkar in 1972. They had two sons and a daughter. His son Dhwanil Parekh is also a poet and a writer.

== See also ==
- List of Gujarati-language writers
