= Bhavesh Bhatt =

Indian Gujarati-language ghazal poet (Born: 1975)

- ભાવેશ દિલીપભાઈ ભટ્ટ
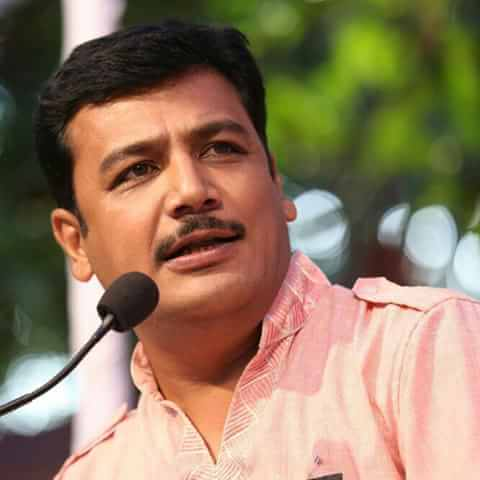
- Bhavesh Bhatt At Asmita Parva, 2014
- Born: Bhavesh Dilipbhai Bhatt; January 12, 1975 (age 51); Mehsana, Gujarat
- Occupation: poet
- Spouse: Bijal (2007–present)
- Writing career
- Language: Gujarati, Urdu
- Years active: 2001–present
- Genre: ghazal
- Notable works: Chhe To Chhe (2009); Bhitarno Shankhanaad (2014)
- Notable awards: Shayda Award (2014); Ravji Patel Award (2014); Yuva Puraskar (2014)
- Bhavesh Bhatt's voice a ghazal written by Bhavesh Bhatt

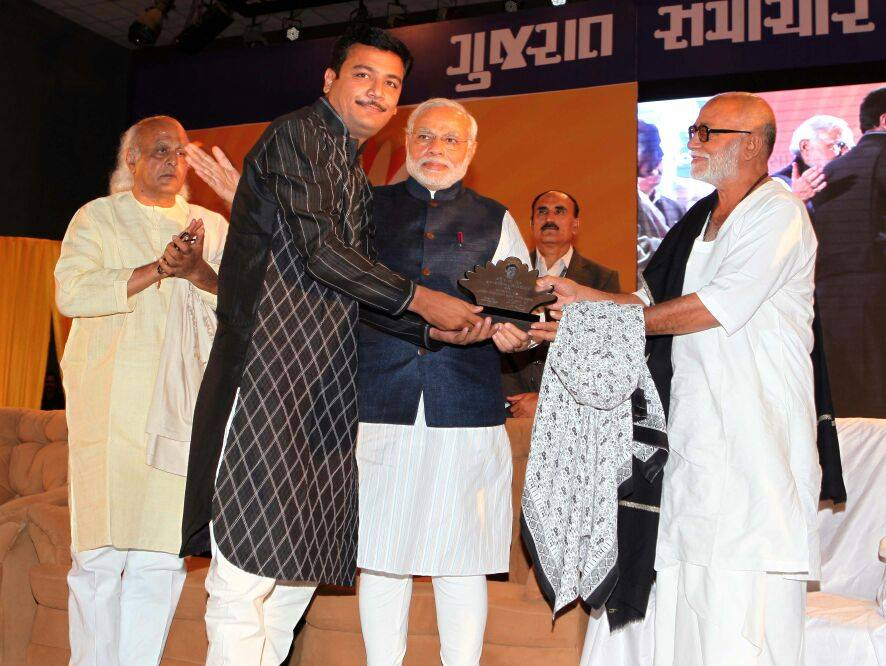
Bhavesh Bhatt with Narendra Modi and Morari Bapu at Ravji Patel Award ceremony in February 2014

Bhavesh Bhatt (Gujarati: ભાવેશ ભટ્ટ) is a Gujarati language ghazal poet from Gujarat, India. His published works include Chhe To Chhe (2009) and Bhitarno Shankhanaad (2014). He won the Shayda Award of 2014 for his contributions to Gujarati ghazal poetry.

== Early life ==
Bhavesh Bhatt was born on 12 January 1975 in Ahmedabad, Gujarat to Dilipbhai and Jayabahen. He completed his primary education (standards 1 to 5) at Ankur High school, Ahmedabad, in 1985 and secondary education (standards 6 to 9) at H. B. Kapadia High School, located at Delhi Darwaza, Ahmedabad, in 1989. He completed his Standard 10 from B. V. High School, Ahmedabad, in 1990 and Standard 12 from Ashish High School, Ahmedabad, in 1992. In 1994, he joined the Bachelor of Arts program at Gujarat College and dropped out after the first year. Bhavesh married Bijal in 2007 and they have a daughter.

== Career ==
He started writing at the age of 25. His first publication was a ghazal, published in the Gujarati poetry journal, Kavilok in 2003. Subsequently, his ghazals are published in several Gujarati literary magazines including Gazalvishwa, Shabdasrishti, Dhabak, Tadarthya, Shabdasar, Navneet Samarpan and Kavita. In 2007, his ghazals have been anthologized in Vis Pancha, a collection of Gujarati ghazals, with four other young poets including Anil Chavda, Ashok Chavda, Hardwar Goswami and Chandresh Makwana. He also writes ghazal in the Urdu language.

== Works ==
Chhe To Chhe, his first poetry collection, was published in 2009, followed by Bhitarno Shankhanaad in 2014, which gained him critical acclaim. He is considered a forerunner of modernity in the Gujarati ghazal and emphasized on the need to derive innovative works from the language itself. His ghazals mainly revolved around subjects like love, social paradoxes, contemporary life, and God.

== Awards ==
He received the Shayda Award in 2014. He also received the Ravji Patel Award in 2014, instituted by Gujarat Samachar and Samanvay, as well as the Yuva Puraskar (2014) instituted by Bharatiya Bhasha Parishad, Kolkata.

== See also ==
- List of Gujarati-language writers
