= Bhitarno Shankhanaad =

Collection of Gujarati ghazals by Bhavesh Bhatt (2014)

- Coverpage of Bhitarno Shankhanaad
- Author: Bhavesh Bhatt
- Cover artist: Kurang Mehta
- Language: Gujarati
- Genre: Ghazal anthology
- Published: 2014
- Publisher: Rannade Prakashan
- Publication date: January 2014
- Publication place: India
- Media type: Print
- Pages: 126
- Awards: Ravji Patel Award (2014); Shayda Award (2014)
- ISBN: 978-93-82456-64-3
- Dewey Decimal: 891.471
- Preceded by: Chhe To Chhe

Bhitarno Shankhanaad (Gujarati: ભીતરનો શંખનાદ) is a collection of Gujarati ghazals by Bhavesh Bhatt. It is published by Rannade Prakashan, Ahmedabad in January 2014. It is preceded by Chhe To Chhe. The preface of the book has written by Rajesh Vyas 'Miskin', Ankit Trivedi and Dr. Sharad Thaker.

== Content ==
The book is consist of 112 ghazals. Most of the ghazals of the book have composed in an Arabic metres such as Ramal, Mutkarib, Mutdarik, Majharia and Khafif.

== Reception ==
Poet Bhavesh Bhatt was awarded the Shayda Award of 2014 for his works Chhe To Chhe (2008) and Bhitar No Shankhanaad. Some ghazals of this collection such as "Achanak Vahen Ma Badlaav Aave", "Aarti Utaarvani Emane Aadat Hati" And "Ek Pandadu Khare To Amne Farak Pade Chhe" are very popular in mushairas.
