= Savaar Laine =

Gujarati language ghazal anthology

- Cover of Savaar Laine
- Author: Anil Chavda
- Cover artist: Afaq Maniar
- Language: Gujarati
- Genre: Gujarati Ghazal
- Publisher: Navbharat Sahitya Mandir, Ahmedabad
- Publication date: 15 February 2012
- Publication place: India
- Media type: Print (hardback & paperback)
- Pages: 96
- Awards: Takhtasinh Parmar Prize (2012-13); Yuva Puraskar (2014)
- ISBN: 978-81-8440-680-1
- OCLC: 843085313
- Dewey Decimal: 891.471
- LC Class: PK1859.C285

Savaar Laine (Gujarati: સવાર લઈને, English: Bringing the Dawn to You) is the first collection of ghazals written by Anil Chavda, a poet from Gujarat, India. The book won the Yuva Gaurav Award of 2014, instituted by the Sahitya Akademi, Delhi. The book was reviewed by Gujarati poets and writers including Chandrakant Topiwala, Raghuvir Chaudhari, Chinu Modi, Harsh Brahmbhatt and Saumya Joshi.

== Content ==
Kem gumshum thai gayo? Kain bol; ne aa ghav shana chhe?
Shu thayun, tadko tane vagyo? Jara zakal lagavi daun?
English Translation:
Why so silent? Say something at least, what are these wounds made of?
Did sunray hurt you? Shall I smear the dews drops?

— Anil Chavda (Savaar Laine, page 29)

There are seventy ghazals in this book, composed in the form of four, five or six shear. The Arabic meters 'Ramal' and 'Hazaj' have been used in this ghazal by the poet. 'Kataav', the meter used in several ghazals of this book, is lucid and has an easy flow.

The two main emotions depicted in these ghazals are intensity of pain and discordance with worldly life. The poet, however, is not a representative for Westernized modern sensibility, though he has depicted the perplexity and suffocation of modern life.

The ghazals, composed in long meters, are a significant work of the poet.
