= Chhe To Chhe =

Anthology of Ghazals by Bhavesh Bhatt (2008)

- Coverpage of Chhe To Chhe
- Author: Bhavesh Bhatt
- Cover artist: Kiran Thakar
- Language: Gujarati
- Genre: Ghazal anthology
- Published: 2008
- Publisher: self published
- Publication date: May 2008
- Publication place: India
- Media type: Print
- Pages: 68
- Awards: Shayda Award (2014)
- OCLC: 862629692
- Dewey Decimal: 891.471
- Followed by: Bhitarno Shankhanaad

Chhe To Chhe (Gujarati: છે તો છે) is an anthology written by Bhavesh Bhatt containing Ghazals in Gujarati language. It was first published in May 2008. The book was followed by Bhavesh's another book Bhitarno Shankhanaad in 2014

== Content ==
The title of the book translates to "Because It Is So". The book consists of forty-eight ghazals. The preface of the book was written by Indu Puwar and Chinu Modi.

== Reception ==
Bhavesh Bhatt received the Shayda Award, and the Ravji Patel Award in 2014 for Chhe To Chhe and his other work, Bhitarno Shankhanaad. The title ghazal, printed on the seventh page, "Chhidra valu vahan chhe to chhe", and the first ghazal, "Chinta karvani me chhodi" (Gujarati: ચિંતા કરવાની મેં છોડી / English: I quit worrying) are popular recitation selections at many mushairas.
