= Dalkhi Thi Saav Chhutan =

Gujarati poetry book

Dalkhithi Saav Chhutan
- Author: Ashok Chavda
- Cover artist: Sanjay Vaidya
- Language: Gujarati
- Subject: Committed poetry
- Genre: Ghazal, Geet, free verse
- Publisher: Rannade Prakashan, Ahmedabad
- Publication date: 6 December 2012
- Publication place: India
- Media type: Print (hardback & paperback)
- Pages: 82
- ISBN: 978-93-82456-08-7
- Dewey Decimal: 891.471

Dalkhithi Saav Chhutan (Gujarati: ડાળખીથી સાવ છૂટાં) (English: Severed From Its Branch) is a collection of committed poetry in Gujarati written by Ashok Chavda 'Bedil'. The book won the Yuva Puraskar (2013) instituted by Sahitya Akademi, New Delhi. The book consists of deep and intense emotions of the poet expressed in different forms of poetry such as ghazal, Geet, and free verse. The poems in this book deal with social issues in India, such as castism and untouchability.

== Content ==
The book consists of 24 ghazals, 3 muktaks, 15 geets, and 10 free verses. Most of the ghazals of this book have been composed in Arabic meters 'Khafif', 'Ramal' and 'Hazaj'. All the poems in this book are centered around the deep-rooted caste system of the country and the shattered dreams of Dalit - the historical and social tragedy that has been passed on from generation to generation.

== Reception ==
The book garnered critical acclaim from several Gujarati language authors and critics, including Raghuvir Chaudhari, Chandrakant Topiwala, Rajesh Pandya and Neerav Patel. A ghazal from this book that reflects the true emotions of the Dalit community, entitled Bahaar Rakhyo Chhe, is considered by some critics to be the best in its class, and has also appeared in Kavitachayan (2009), selected poems of the year, published by Gujarati Sahitya Parishad. Chandrakant Topiwala noted in Samipe (May 2014 issue), the satire in a shear-like Hari nu ghar aam hoy chhe kevu?, Kem puchhi shakaay harijan thi? which reaches a height of poetry of chabakha.

== Awards ==
The book won the Yuva Puraskar Award in 2013 instituted by Sahitya Akademi, New Delhi and the Dasi Jivan Award in 2014 by Government of Gujarat.
