= Gujarati Tunki Vartama Pariveshni Karyasadhakta =

2012 book by Rajesh Vankar

- Coverpage of the book
- Author: Rajesh Vankar
- Cover artist: Ketan Rajyaguru
- Language: Gujarati
- Subject: Literary criticism of Short story
- Set in: Godhra, Gujarat
- Published: 2012
- Publisher: self published
- Publication place: India
- Media type: Print
- Pages: 512
- Awards: Gujarat Sahitya Akademi's Best Book Prize (for research)
- ISBN: 978-93-81471-24-1

Gujarati Tunki Vartama Pariveshni Karyasadhakta (Gujarati: ગુજરાતી ટૂંકી વાર્તામાં પરિવેશની કાર્યસાધકતા) (English: The Function of Setting in Gujarati Short Stories) is an analysis of Gujarati short stories that served as Rajesh Vankar's doctoral dissertation.

It is the result of research on Gujarati short stories in the Gujarati language. The book gives an extensive description of setting as an element in a short story, especially in Gujarati short stories. The book won the Best Book Prize for research in 2012 as instituted by Gujarat Sahitya Akademi.

== Background ==
Vankar started his research in 2005 to obtain his PhD and completed it in 2010. The research results were published in 2012 as a book with the financial assistance of Gujarat Sahitya Akademi. The preface to the book is written by Manilal H. Patel.

== Synopsis ==
The dissertation analyzes the literary element of setting, with examples from Gujarati short stories.

The first chapter, Parivesh: Sangya Ane Suchitartho ("Setting: Definition and Meanings") discusses the definitions and meanings of setting in Indian and World literature.

The second chapter, Sahitya Vivechan Kshetre Parivesh Vicharnanu Swarup ("Various Concepts of Setting in the Field of Literary Criticism"), considers how setting has been critiqued by an Indian literary critic and other international critics.

The third chapter, Gujarati Tunki Vartama Pariveshni Karyasadhakta ("The Function of Setting in Gujarati Short Stories"), discusses setting in traditional, modern, and postmodern Gujarati short stories. Types of settings include Rural, Urban, Social, Backwards area, Cultural, Historical, Mythological, Psychic, and Scientific.

The final chapter discusses ten short stories by Gujarati writers including Dhumketu, Sundaram, Jayant Khatri, Suresh Joshi, Kishor Jadav, Madhu Rye, Shirish Panchal, Mohan Parmar, Nazir Mansuri and Dasharath Parmar.

== Awards ==
The book won the Best Book Prize in research category in 2012 from Gujarat Sahitya Akademi.
