= Yuva Gaurav Puraskar =

Yuva Gaurav Puraskar Yuva Gaurav Award
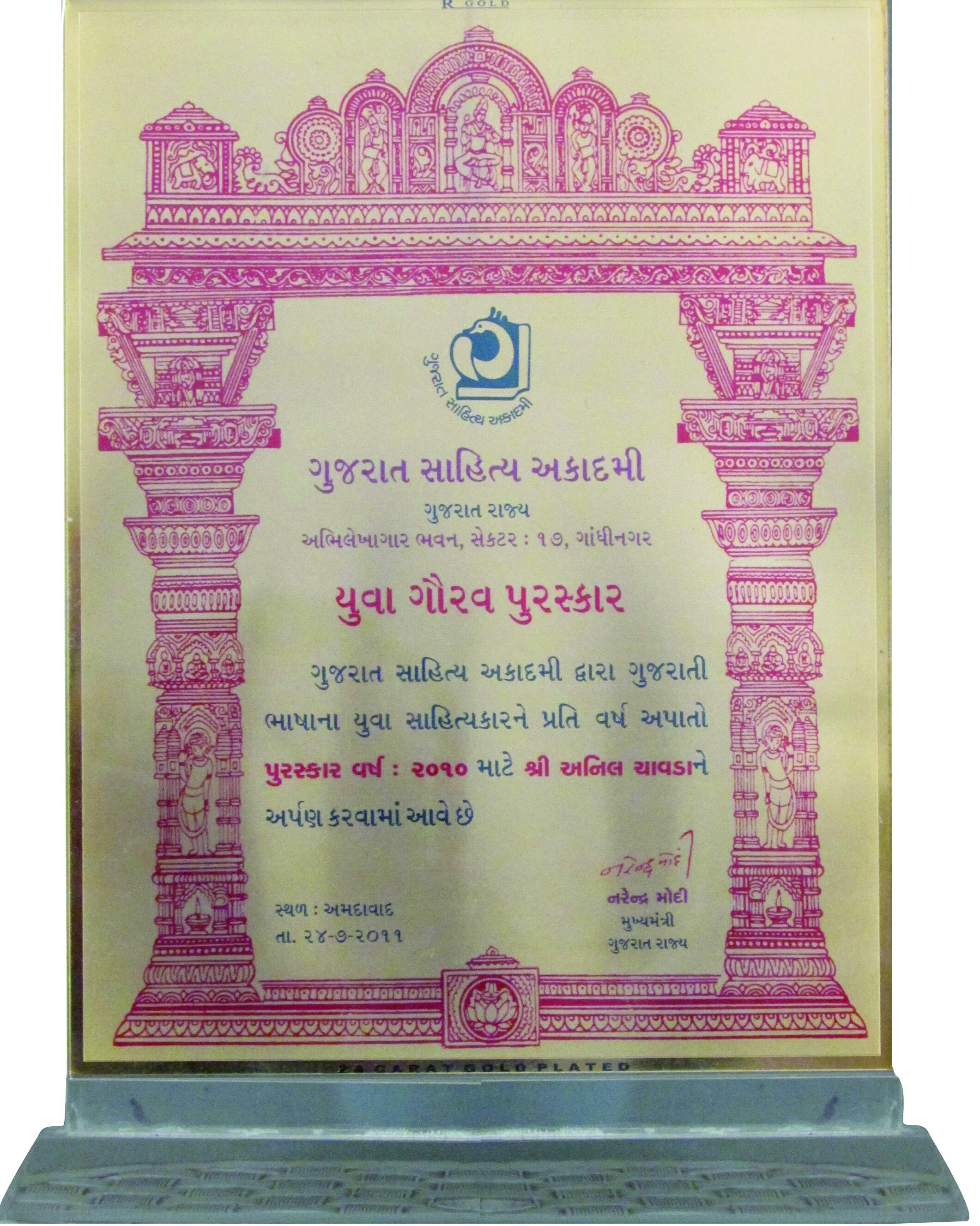
- Yuva Gaurav Award of Gujarat Sahitya Akadami
- Awarded for: Literary honour in Gujarat, India
- Sponsored by: Government of Gujarat
- Location: Gandhinagar
- Country: India
- Presented by: Gujarat Sahitya Akademi
- Reward: ₹50,000
- First award: 2007
- Final award: 2020
- Currently held by: Raam Mori

Yuva Gaurav Award is a literary honour conferred by Gujarat Sahitya Akademi, Government of Gujarat. Established in 2007, the award recognizes and promotes young Gujarati authors. The award comprises a certificate, shawl and a cash prize of ₹50,000.

== Recipients ==
Year	Recipient
2007	Saumya Joshi
2008	Dhwanil Parekh
2009	Hardwar Goswami
2010	Anil Chavda
2011	Ankit Trivedi
2012	Ashok Chavda
2013	Esha Dadawala
2014	Ishita Dave
2015	Girish Parmar
2016	Ajaysinh Chauhan
2017	Jigar Joshi
2018	Sagar Shah
2019	Prashant Patel
2020	Rinku Rathod
2021	Raam Mori
