= Jagdeep Smart =

- Born: 9 March 1956
- Died: 4 November 2009 (aged 53)
- Occupation: Artist

Jagdeep Smart (9 March 1956 – 4 November 2009) was an Indian artist, professor and puppeteer.

== Biography ==
Jagdeep Smart completed his Master's in Arts in the Faculty of Fine arts from Maharaja Sayaji Roa University. It was his uncle, the painter and Sir J.J. School of Art graduate, Vasudev Smart, who inspired and encouraged him to explore lines and colours in his work.

He was a contemporary artist and a professor of Fine Arts at Veer Narmad South Gujarat University. He was also a budding poet and had translated M.F. Husain's biography in Gujarati, which was published as "Dada no dangoro lidho". He sketched a building in the Nanpura reclamation area of Surat city between 1986–87 which documents the architecture of an era bygone. Quite a few buildings sketched by him like the Vohra mansion have given way to new multistory buildings.

He held educational puppet shows for children in deprived areas. He also promoted annual week-long art festivals for children to display their talent and skills. He had also participated extensively in art workshops with Bhupen Khakhar at Nathdwara. He had developed the fine arts and interior design courses for Veer Narmad South Gujarat University (VNSGU) during the last three years. He had won several awards for his work including, Kalidas Academy Award, Ujjain and three Gujarat Lalit Kala Akademi awards, award for painting by UNICEF, an award from Gujarat State Lalit Kala Academy in the Best Drawing Artist category, and an Outstanding Personality in the Field of Fine Arts Award by the Giant Group of Greater Surat. He did several shows across India including a one-man show at Jahangir Art Gallery. Jagdeep Smart also exhibited his works at the Jehangir Art Gallery in Mumbai, the Herwitz Gallery in Ahmedabad, and the Anant Art Gallery in Surat. He also organised a special show – "Ma" – dedicated to his mother at the Rotary Art Gallery, Surat.
