= Ajaysinh Chauhan =

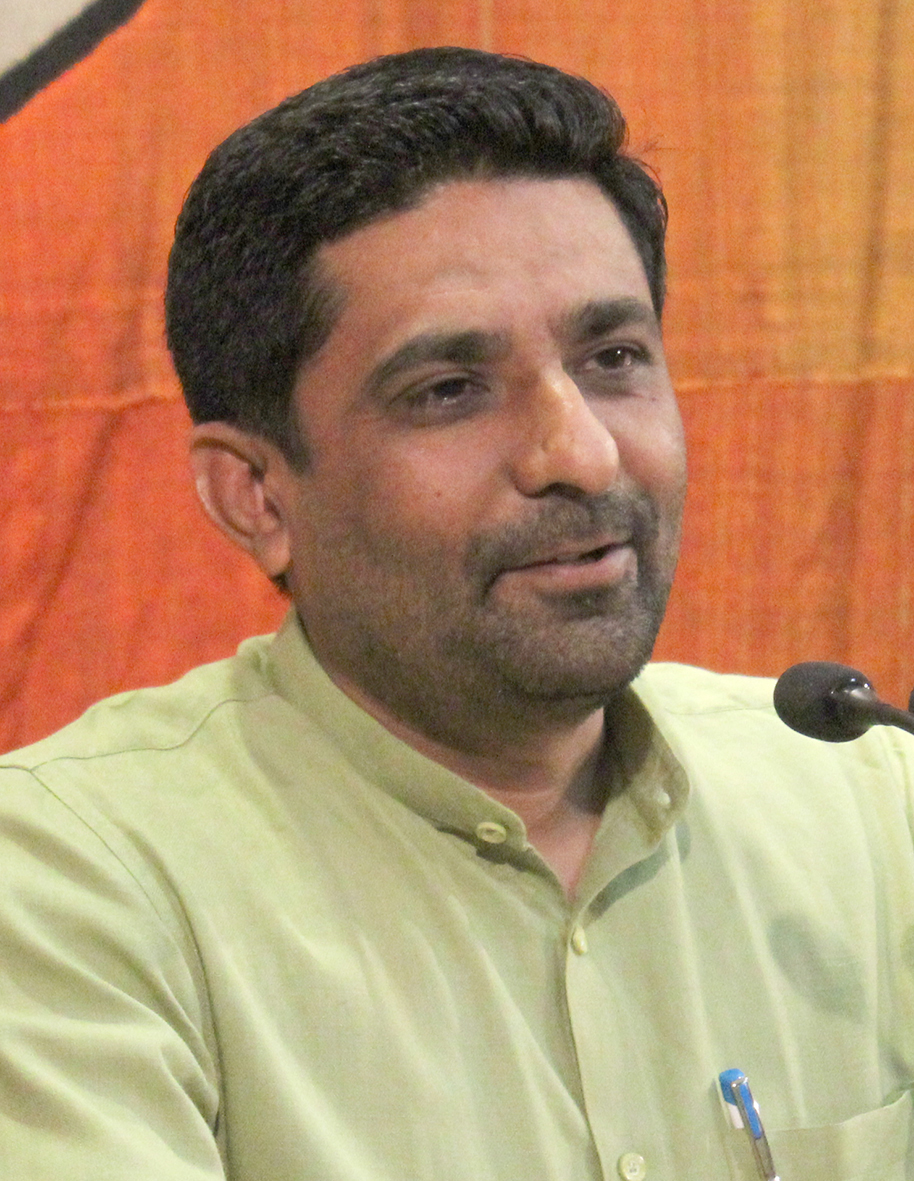
Ajaysinh Chauhan at Gujarat Vishwakosh Trust, 11 May 2019

Ajaysinh Chauhan is a Gujarati writer and critic from Gujarat, India. He was a registrar of the Gujarat Sahitya Akademi and an editor of its organ, Shabdasrishti.

== Life ==
He was born on 25 September 1983. He completed Bachelor of Arts in 2003, Master of Arts in 2005, and MPhil in 2006 from the Sardar Patel University. He obtained PhD from the same university in 2013 under Manilal H. Patel; for his research work Adhunikottar Gujarati Kavita (Postmodern Gujarati poetry).

He served as the Senate Member of Faculty of Arts and as the Member of Gujarati Board of Studies at Sardar Patel University. He was a member of Governing Body of Gujarati Sahitya Parishad from 2013 to 2017. Since 2018, he serves as a registrar of Gujarat Sahitya Akadami.

== Works ==
He published his Ph.D. thesis, Adhunikottar Gujarati Kavita, as a book in 2013. He edited Amritlal Vegadnu Pravas Sahitya, Sarvatraramya Narmada, Gaam Javani Hath Chhodi De (poems of Manilal H. Patel) and Kalavithi.

== Awards ==
He was awarded the Ramanlal Joshi Vivechan Paritoshik by Gujarati Sahitya Parishad in 2013 for his work Adhunikottar Gujarati Kavita. He was awarded by the Gujarat Sahitya Akademi in 2013 for the same work. Gujarat Sahitya Akademi awarded him the Yuva Gaurav Puraskar in 2016 for his contribution in the Gujarati literature.

== See also ==
- List of Gujarati-language writers
