= Kirit Doodhat =

Indian Gujarati-language writer (Born: 1961)

- Doodhat in 2020
- Born: 1 January 1961 (age 65); Mota Ankadiya, Amreli district, Gujarat, India
- Occupations: Short story writer, literary critic, translator, editor
- Writing career
- Language: Gujarati
- Period: Post-modern Gujarati literature

Kirit Kanubhai Doodhat (born 1 January 1961) is an Indian Gujarati-language short story writer, literary critic, translator and editor from Gujarat, India. His short stories depict rural Gujarat, often combining pathos with humour. He co-edited the Gujarati literary journal Etad from 2018 to 2025 and has been serving as an editor of Parab, the journal of the Gujarati Sahitya Parishad, since July 2025.

He was elected president of the Gujarati Sahitya Parishad for the 2027–2029 term.

== Biography ==
Kirit Doodhat was born on 1 January 1961 in Mota Ankadiya, a village in Amreli district, Gujarat, India, to Kanubhai and Narmadabahen. His family originally belonged to Kankot village in Liliya, Amreli district.

He completed his education up to the tenth standard while living with his maternal grandparents in Keriyachad village, Amreli district. He then moved to Ahmedabad to live with his parents and completed his higher secondary education at the Democratic High School in Gomtipur. He then enrolled at Ahmedabad Science College, where he studied for a Bachelor of Science degree before completing a Bachelor of Arts at the same collage.

He took voluntary retirement in September 2013 while serving as Resident Additional Collector of Ahmedabad district.

== Works ==
Doodhat is associated with the Parishkruti movement in Gujarati literature, which focuses on the preservation and revival of traditional culture amid social, economic and linguistic changes. He co-edited the Gujarati literary journal Etad with Kamal Vora from 2018 to 2025 and has been serving as editor of Parab, the organ of the Gujarati Sahitya Parishad, since July 2025.

His short stories depict rural Gujarat and combine pathos with elements of humour.

His short-story collections include Bapa ni Pinpar (1998) and Aam Thaki Javu (2008). He has edited Gujarati Navlika Chayan: 1996 (1997), Ghanshyam Desai ni Tunki Varta (2006) and Classic Bharatiya Vartao (2025), an anthology of Indian short stories translated into Gujarati.

== Awards ==
Doodhat has received the Umashankar Joshi Prize, Jayant Khatri-Bakulesh Award, Manubhai Pancholi 'Darshak' Sahitya Sanman, Dhumketu Award (1997–98–99), Raman Pathak Prize and Takhtasinh Parmar Prize (1998–99).

== See also ==
- List of Gujarati-language writers
