= Veer Narmad South Gujarat University =

Public university in Surat, Gujarat, India

- વીર નર્મદ દક્ષિણ ગુજરાત યુનિવર્સિટી
- Latin: Universitas Australis Gujaratensis Veer Narmad
- Other names: South Gujarat University
- Motto: सत्यम् ज्ञानम् अनन्तम्
- Motto in English: Truth, Knowledge, Infinity
- Type: State University
- Established: 1965; 61 years ago
- Affiliations: UGC, AIU, AICTE, AQA, NAAC, ACU
- Chancellor: Governor of Gujarat
- Vice-Chancellor: Dr. Kishorsinh N. Chavda
- Students: Around 5000-8000+
- Location: Surat, Gujarat, India; 21°09′12″N 72°47′00″E
- Campus: Urban
- Website: www.vnsgu.ac.in

Veer Narmad South Gujarat University is a public university located in the city of Surat, Gujarat, India. Previously known as South Gujarat University, it was renamed as Veer Narmad South Gujarat University (VNSGU) in 2004 in honour of the famous scholar and Gujarati poet Narmad. Established in 1965, the university offers undergraduate and postgraduate courses, including non-traditional postgraduate departments such as public administration, rural studies, comparative literature, and aquatic biology.

== History and profile ==
The university was established by the South Gujarat University Act, 1965. It opened in 1966 and was incorporated as a University on 23 May 1967, and has been recognised by the University Grants Commission in 1968. VNSGU is the first university in India to offer postgraduate courses in rural studies. In 2004, it was renamed as Veer Narmad South Gujarat University after the Gujarat poet Veer Narmad whose real name was Narmadshankar Labhshankar Dave.

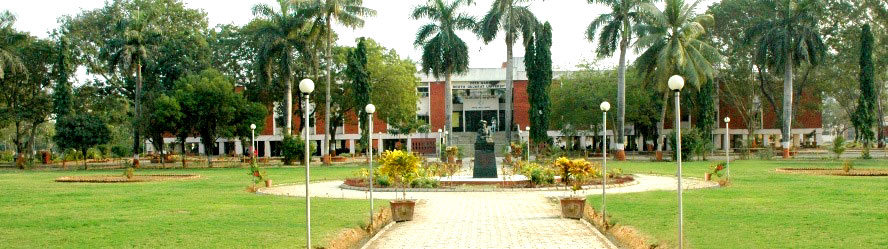
Front view of the main building

== Campus ==
An urban university located in the city of (Vesu)Surat, the university has a campus spread over 810 acres. Over 3000 students study on the campus. The university has faculties of Arts, Commerce, Science, Education, Management Studies, Rural Studies, Engineering and Technology, Medicine, Law and new constituted Computer Science, Homoeopathy and Architecture. Several major and minor research projects are taking place in various departments. All the departments have their own computer laboratories and departmental libraries. The central library with over 1.72 lakh books and subscribes to over 242 national and international journals and 6000 e-journals.

The university campus houses 80 buildings that include 6 boys' hostels and 5 girls' hostels, besides a gymnasium, a health centre, an indoor stadium and residential quarters for its staff. There is also a day care centre. Sports facilities include a fitness centre, basketball court and playground with tracks. CB Patel International Cricket Stadium is a cricket stadium located in the university. The ground covers 3.75 lakh sq. ft meeting the standards of international stadiums, and can accommodate 35,000 people. Then Gujarat Chief Minister and Gujarat Cricket Association head Narendra Modi laid the foundation of the stadium in November 2009. The ground received a donation from a cricket lover Kamlesh Patel. He donated Rs. 5 crore. In February 2011, Narendra Modi then Chief Minister of Gujarat and Gujarat Cricket Association Chief inaugurated the stadium and the stadium is still awaiting for BCCI approval for domestic and international matches.

== Affiliated colleges ==
The Veer Narmad South Gujarat University has 222 college affiliations as per year 2022-2023.

== Departments ==
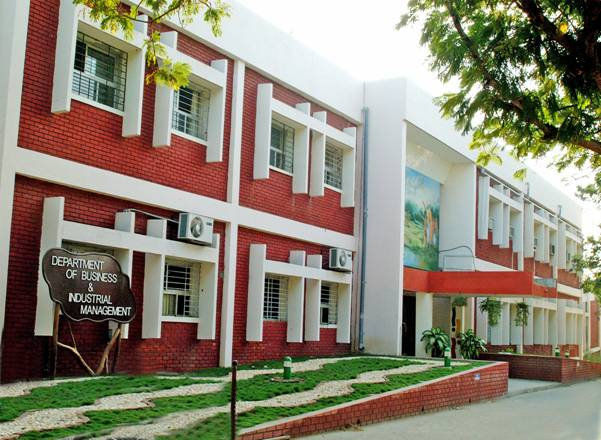
VNSGU Departments

The following Teaching Departments are located on-campus of Veer Narmad South Gujarat University:

- Department of Aquatic Biology
- Department of Architecture
- Department of Biology
- Department of Biotechnology
- Department of Business and Industrial Management
- Department of Chemistry
- Department of Commerce
- Department of Comparative Literature
- Department of Computer Science
- Department of Economics
- Department of Education
- Department of English
- Department of Gujarati
- Department of ICT
- Department of Mass Communication and Journalism
- Department of Law
- Department of Library and Information Science
- Department of Mathematics
- Department of Physics
- Department of Public administration
- Department of Human Resource Development
- Department of Rural Studies
- Department of Sociology
- Department of Statistics
- Department of Fine Arts
- University Science Instrument Center
- Centre for Hindu Studies

== Museums ==
Narmad Smriti Bhavan is a replica of Sarika Sadan, house of Narmad which displayed his works and belongings.

== Notable alumni ==
- Phoolchand Gupta
- Raeesh Maniar
- Esha Dadawala
- Bhagwatikumar Sharma
- Ravindra Parekh
- Dhwanil Parekh
- Kiransinh Chauhan

== Notable faculty ==
- Jagdeep Smart (1956–2009), former Professor of Fine Arts

== See also ==
- Gujarat University
- Hemchandracharya North Gujarat University
- List of tourist attractions in Surat
