= Dhwanil Parekh =

Indian poet, critic, and playwright

- Born: Dhwanil Ravindrabhai Parekh; 28 October 1976 (age 49); Surat, Gujarat, India
- Education: Master of Arts; Ph.D.
- Alma mater: Veer Narmad South Gujarat University
- Occupations: Poet, Critic, Playwright
- Spouse: Nayna (2003 - present)
- Children: Dhyan
- Relatives: Ravindra Parekh, Pushpa (parents)
- Writing career
- Language: Gujarati
- Years active: 1992 - present
- Genres: Ghazal, Drama
- Notable works: Dariyo Bhalene Mane (2008); Antim Yuddha (2009)
- Notable awards: Yuva Gaurav Puraskar (2008); Yuva Puraskar (2011)

Signature
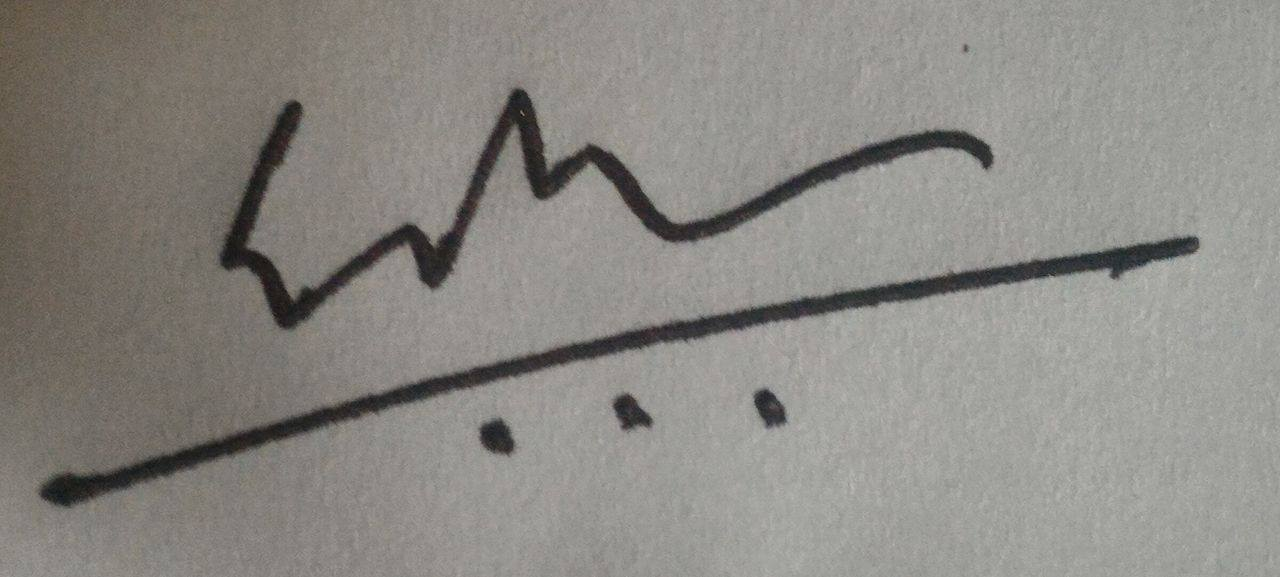

Dhwanil Ravindrabhai Parekh (b. 28 October 1976 ) is a Gujarati language poet, critic and playwright from Gujarat, India. His significant works include Dariyo Bhalene Maane (2008; Ghazal anthology), Antim Yuddha (2009; drama) and Sanket (2011; critical works). He won Yuva Puraskar of Sahitya Akademi, New Delhi for his work Antim Yuddha in 2011. He is also a recipient of Yuva Gaurav Puraskar of 2008 instituted by Gujarat Sahitya Akademi.

== Early life ==
Parekh was born in Surat, Gujarat. His parents are Pushpa and Ravindra (a poet and writer). He completed his primary education in Surat. He completed his Std. 10 in 1992 from Kadiwala High School, Surat and Std. 12 in 1994 from Proprietary English School, Surat. He got his Bachelor of Arts in 1997 from J.Z. Shah Arts and H.P. Desai Commerce College, Amroli and Master of Arts in 1999 from M.T.B. Arts College, Surat in Gujarati literature. In 2005, he earned a Ph.D. for his research Natakma Myth : Bharatiya Bhashaoma Lakhayela Mahabharat Aadharit Natakono Alochanatmak Abhyas (A critical study of Indian dramas based on Mahabharata) from South Gujarat University.

== Career ==
Parekh started his career as a journalist and served as reporter at different media including Navgujarat Times, Pratinidhi Patra and Channel Surat. In 2001, he joined M.T.B. Arts College, Surat as a junior research fellow and continued there until 2002. From 2002 to 2006, he served as an assistant lecturer at Dr. Babasaheb Ambedkar Open University. He served as an assistant lecturer at M.S. University from June 2006 to November 2006. In 2006, he became an assistant lecturer at M.D. Gramseva Mahavidyalay, Sadra. He started to write poems in 1992 and got published for first time in Gujarat magazine.

== Works ==
Ajavalu Suratnu, his first ghazal anthology with other 3 poets, was published in 2003, followed by Dariyo Bhalene Maane (2008). His first critical work Sakshibhav was published in 2007, followed by Natakma Myth (2007), Satvikam (2010) and Sanket (2011; The Sign). Antim Yuddha (2009; The Ultimate War) is a drama play written by him.

== Recognition ==
Gujarat Sahitya Akademi awarded him Yuva Gaurav Puraskar in 2008 for his contribution in Gujarati literature. He won Yuva Puraskar of 2011 instituted by Sahitya Akademi, New Delhi for Antim Yuddha, also awarded by Mahendra Bhagat Prize (2008–09) of Gujarati Sahitya Parishad. He received Batubhai Umarvadiya Prize (2004) for Bolpen Nu Kholu (one act play) and Yashwant Pandya Prize (2005) for Shaap (one act play). His critical work Natakma Myth was awarded by Ramanlal Joshi Prize and his ghazal anthology Dariyo Bhalene Maane was awarded the Manharlal Chokshi Prize.

== Personal life ==
Parekh married Nayna on 8 February 2003 and they have a son, Dhyan.

== See also ==
- List of Gujarati-language writers
