= Ankit Trivedi =

Indian Gujarati-language poet, writer, columnist, and emcee (Born: 1981)

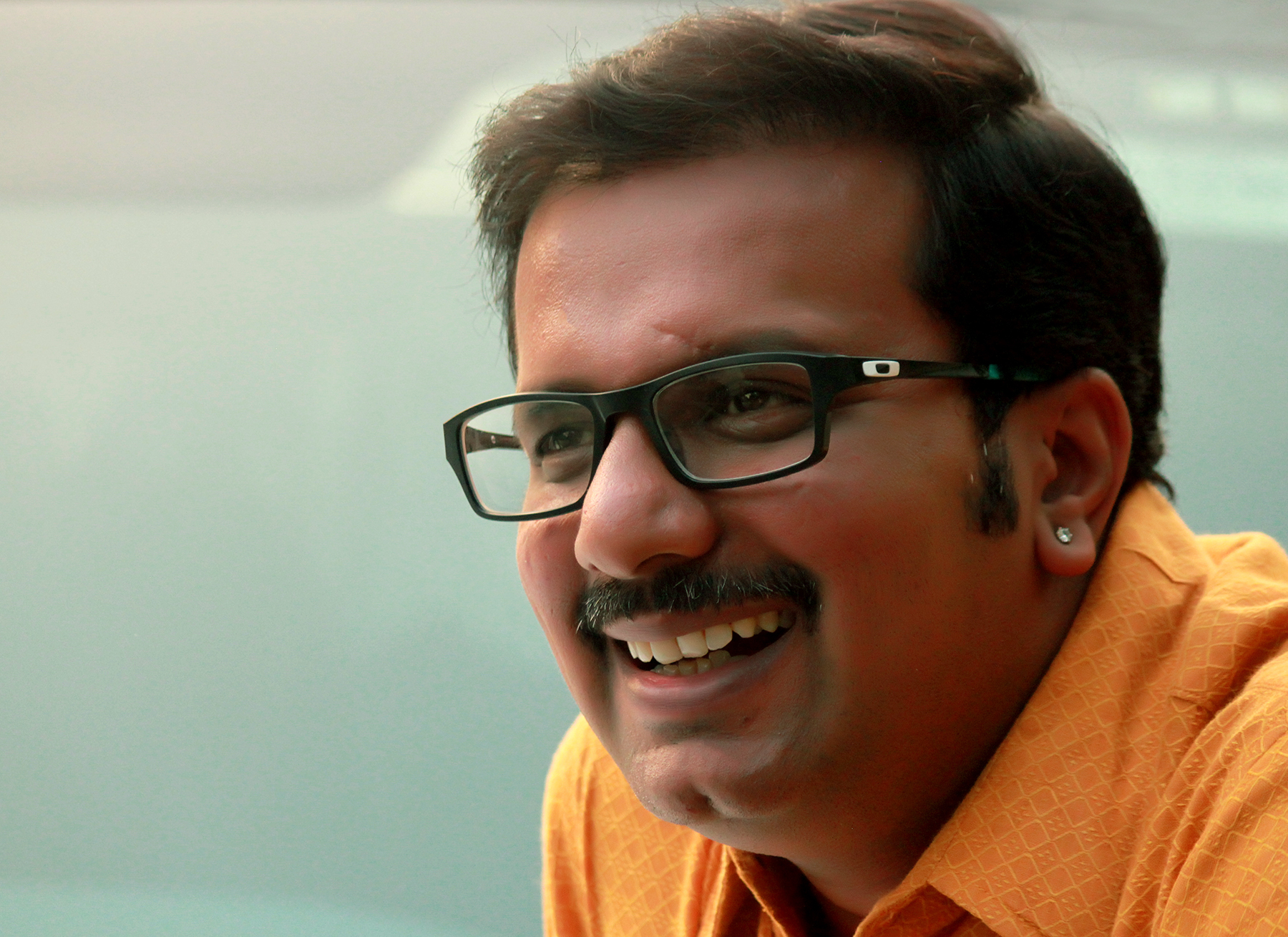
- Trivedi in Ahmedabad; November 2015
- Born: Ankit Amarishkumr Trivedi; 9 March 1981 (age 45); Ahmedabad, Gujarat, India
- Education: Gujarat University
- Occupations: poet, writer, emcee, columnist
- Spouse: Bhumika Trivedi (m. 2010)
- Children: Mitra (daughter)
- Writing career
- Language: Gujarati
- Genres: Ghazal, geet
- Notable works: Gazal Purvak (2006); Geet Purvak
- Notable awards: Takhtasinh Parmar Prize (2006-07); Shayda Award (2008); Yuva Gaurav Puraskar (2011); Yuva Puraskar (2016)

Ankit Trivedi (born 9 March 1981) is a Gujarati language poet, writer, columnist, and emcee from Gujarat, India. His significant works include Gazal Purvak (collection of ghazals) and Geet Purvak (collection of geets). The Indian National Theater in Mumbai awarded him the 2008 Shayda Award for his contribution to Gujarati ghazal. He has received the Takhtasinh Parmar Prize, Yuva Gaurav Puraskar, and the Yuva Puraskar. In 2019, he was awarded a D.Lit. by Gujarat University.

== Early life ==
Trivedi was born in Ahmedabad, Gujarat to Amarishkumar and Jayshribahen. He took his schooling at Ahmedabad and completed a Bachelor of Commerce from Gujarat University.

Trivedi married Bhumika Trivedi on 12 December 2010. They have a daughter named Mitra.

== Works ==
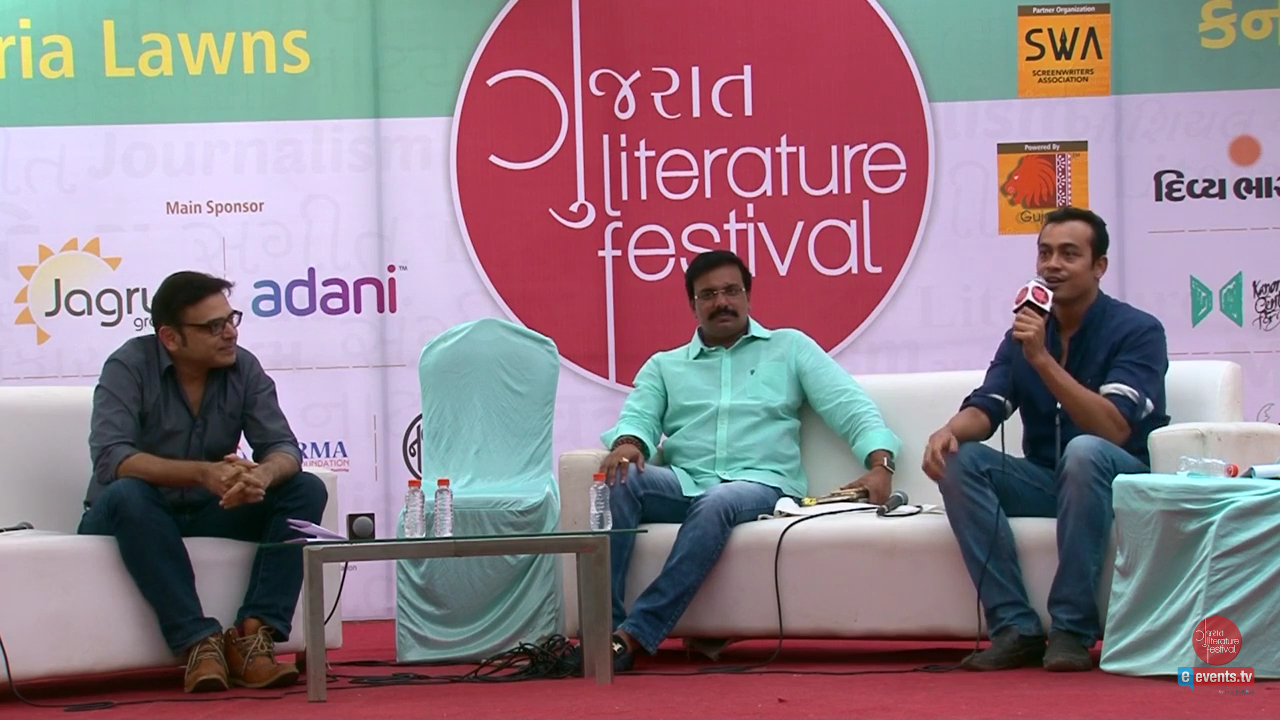
Harsh Chhaya, Ankit Trivedi and Abhishek Jain at GLF - 2016

Trivedi published his first anthology Gazal Purvak, a collection of ghazals, in 2006, followed by Geet Purvak. He published Maitrivishwa in 2006 which is a collection of essays written by him. He edited Gazalvishwa, a Gujarati ghazal poetry journal, from 2006 to 2007.

=== Compilations ===
- Avinashi Avinash
- Mahendi Na Paan
- Masoom Hawa Na Misra (collection of the ghazals of new generation)
- Missing Bakshi
- Kahevat Vishwa
- Sambhare Re, Balpan Na Sambharna (2011)
- Jivan Na Hakarno Photograph (2014)
- Sol Varas Ni Mosam (2014) (compilation of poems in Gujarati)
- Close Up Nu Smile Please

=== Plays ===
- Varsad Bhinjve
- Parpotana Gharma
- Urmila (Ekokti)
- Baa Ne Gher Baabo Aavyo
- Madhapar Ladies Special
- Aa Kokilanu Kain Karo

== Filmography ==
Trivedi worked as a screenwriter on the 2017 Gujarati comedy film, Carry On Kesar.

== Recognition ==
Trivedi was awarded the Takhtasinh Parmar Prize (2006–07) and the Yuva Puraskar in 2016 for his book Gazal Purvak. In 2008, he won the Shayda Award from the Indian National Theater, Mumbai. His collection of geets, Geet Purvak, was awarded the Bhanuprasad Pandya Prize (2010–11). For his poetry, he received the Yuva Gaurav Puraskar award (2011) and for his contribution to Gujarati literature, the Harindra Dave Memorial Award (2011). In 2019, he was awarded a D.Lit. by Gujarat University.

== See also ==
- List of Gujarati-language writers
