= Takhtasinh Parmar Prize =

Indian literary award

- Shri Takhtasinh Paritoshik
- Awarded for: Literary honour in Gujarat, India
- Location: Ahmedabad
- Country: India
- Presented by: Gujarati Sahitya Parishad
- First award: 1981
- Final award: 2013
- Currently held by: Anil Chavda

The Takhtasinh Parmar Prize, also known as Shri Takhtasinh Parmar Paritoshik (Gujarati: શ્રી તખ્તસિંહ પરમાર પારિતોષિક), is a literary award presented by Gujarati Sahitya Parishad. The prize, which recognizes debut books by Gujarati authors, was established in 1981 and is awarded every other year.

== Recipients ==
Recipients of the award include:

Year	Recipient	Book
1980–81	Mangal Rathod	Baagma
1982–83	Saroop Dhruv	Mara Hath Ni Vaat
1984–85	Kirit Purohit	Kilkil
1986–87	Himanshi Shelat	Antaral
1988–89	Harish Meenashru	Dhribang Sundar Aeni Per Bolya
1990–91	Mukesh Vaidya	Chandani na Hans
1992–93	Sanskritirani Desai	Suryo J Suryo
1994–95	Arvind Bhatt	Ek Pinchhu Mornu
1996–97	Minakshi Dikshit	Anjani Tane Yaad Chhe?
1998–99	Kirit Doodhat	Bapa Ni Pinpal
2000–01	Rajesh Pandya	Pruthvine Aa Chhede
2002–03	Mona Patrawala	Rani Bilado
2004–05	Vipasha	Upaleta Rangothi Risayeli Bhinto
2006–07	Ankit Trivedi	Gazalpurvak
2008–09	Saumya Joshi	Greenroomma
2010–11	Prerana K. Limadi	Ane Retpankhi
2012–13	Anil Chavda	Savaar Laine
2021-22	Yamini Patel	Aalambh
