= Ahmedabad International Literature Festival =

Annual literary festival in Gujarat, India

Ahmedabad International Literature Festival અમદાવાદ ઈન્ટરનેશનલ લિટરેચર ફેસ્ટિવલ
- Status: Active
- Genre: Literary festival
- Frequency: Annual
- Location: Ahmedabad
- Country: India
- Years active: 10
- Inaugurated: November 12, 2016
- Founder: Umashanker Yadav
- Most recent: November 24, 2023
- Participants: 60 to 80
- Attendance: 5000 to 7000
- Leader: Umashanker Yadav
- People: Anil Chavda; Arthur Duff; Diti Vyas; Vasant Gadhavi
- Member: Pinki Vyas; Rashmi Goyal
- Sponsors: Ikon Barcode Solutions Pvt. Ltd.; ONGC; Gujarat Tourism; GMDC; Reliance Industries Limited
- Website: ailf.co.in

The Ahmedabad International Literature Festival (or AILF) is an annual literary festival in Ahmedabad, Gujarat, India. It is held every year in November or in December for two days. The Ahmedabad International Literature Festival was founded by Umashanker Yadav and is organized by the IKON Education Foundation.

The objective of the festival is to promote literacy, literature and bring together experts in the field. The festival invites established and emerging writers, publishers, journalists, academics, readers and students from all over India and abroad. It played an instrumental role in determining the link between Gujarati, Indian and international literature.

== History ==
Umashanker Yadav and Pinki Vyas serve as directors of the festival. Anurita Rathore served as a festival curator for the first edition. The members of the festival's advisory board include Anil Chavda (Gujarati poet), Arthur Duff (academic), Diti Vyas (writer and academic) and Vasant Gadhavi (former chief information commissioner of Gujarat). The festival is open to the public.

== Timeline ==
=== First edition ===
The inaugural Ahmedabad International Literature Festival was held on 12 and 13 November 2016, featuring 60 authors and speakers from various fields. It was inaugurated by Yogesh Ghadvi, Gujarati novelist Raghuveer Chaudhari and British deputy high commissioner Geoff Wain. Some of the notable speakers were: Madhur Bhandarkar, Piyush Mishra, Anuja Chandramouli, Anil Chavda, Vinod Joshi and Chinu Modi. The festival hosted a session on 'Literature and Cinema' featuring lyricist and screenwriter Sandeep Nath and filmmaker Abhishek Jain.

=== Second edition ===
The second edition was held on 23 and 24 December 2017 at Ahmedabad Management Association (AMA). It featured around 80 speakers. The festival hosted several sessions, including Gujarati Cinema, Visual Presentation of Written Words, Old vs. New Gujarati Literature and Popularity vs. quality of literature. Actor and television presenter Annu Kapoor was a featured speaker and commentator.

=== Third edition ===
The third edition of the festival, inaugurated by Bhupendrasinh Chudasama, was held on 24 and 25 November 2018 at Knowledge Consortium of Gujarat (KCG), Ahmedabad, featuring more than 60 speakers including Vivek Oberoi, Harsh Brahmbhatt and Vishnu Pandya. Around 7000 people attended this edition. For the first time, the festival launched a multi-language Kavi sammelan (poetry-gathering) which featured poets from Gujarati, Hindi, Urdu, French, Bengali and English languages.

=== Fourth edition ===
The fourth edition of the festival was held on 16 and 17 November 2019 again at the Knowledge Consortium of Gujarat. Inaugurated by governor Acharya Devvrat, the festival hosted a total of 18 sessions with 60 speakers. Some of the notable speakers were: Sushant Singh, Mallika Sarabhai, Kingshuk Nag, Frédérick Lavoie and Gael de Kerguenec.

=== Sixth edition ===
The 6th edition of AILF was held in 2021. All the sessions were streamed online due to COVID-19 pandemic.

=== Seventh edition ===
The seventh edition of the festival was held on 8 and 9 October 2022 at the Centre for Environment Education (CEE). The main theme of the edition was 'Humans, Nature and the Future'.

=== Eighth Edition ===
The 8th edition of the Ahmedabad International Literature Festival took place over three days, focusing on the theme 'Literature and Human Development.' The inauguration ceremony was led by Dr. Justice K.J. Thaker, Chairperson of the Gujarat State Human Rights Commission. The event, which commenced on November 24, 2023, at CEE Ahmedabad, featured key dignitaries such as Dr. SK Nanda, IAS (Retd.), and renowned actor-poet Akhilendra Mishra.

=== Ninth edition ===
The ninth edition of the festival was held on 5 and 6 October 2024 at the CEE.

== See also ==
- List of literary festivals in India
