= Saumya Joshi =

Indian poet, writer, playwright, director and actor

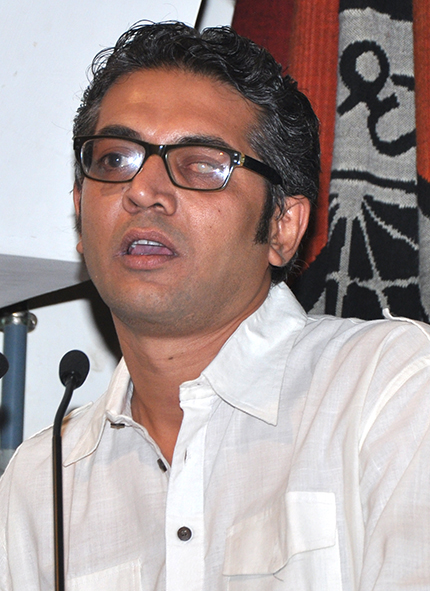
- Joshi at Gujarat Vishwakosh Trust; April 2013
- Born: Saumya Jayantbhai Joshi; 3 July 1973 (age 53); Ahmedabad, Gujarat
- Education: Master of Arts
- Alma mater: Gujarat University
- Occupations: poet, writer, playwright, director, actor
- Relatives: Abhijat Joshi (elder brother)
- Writing career
- Language: Gujarati
- Years active: 1991–present
- Genres: Drama, Ghazal, Free verse, Geet
- Notable works: Greenroomma (2008); Welcome Zindagi; 102 Not Out
- Notable awards: Takhtasinh Parmar Prize (2008–09); Yuva Gaurav Puraskar (2007)

Saumya Joshi (born 3 July 1973) is an Indian poet, writer, playwright, director and actor associated with Gujarati language literature, theatre and films. He is known in Gujarati theatre for his plays Welcome Zindagi and 102 Not Out. Greenroomma (2008; In the Greenroom) is his collection of poems. He has been awarded by Chandravadan Chimanlal Mehta Award for his contribution to Gujarati theatre in 2013. He is also recipient of the Yuva Gaurav Puraskar (2007) and Takhtasinh Parmar Prize (2008–09).

== Early life ==
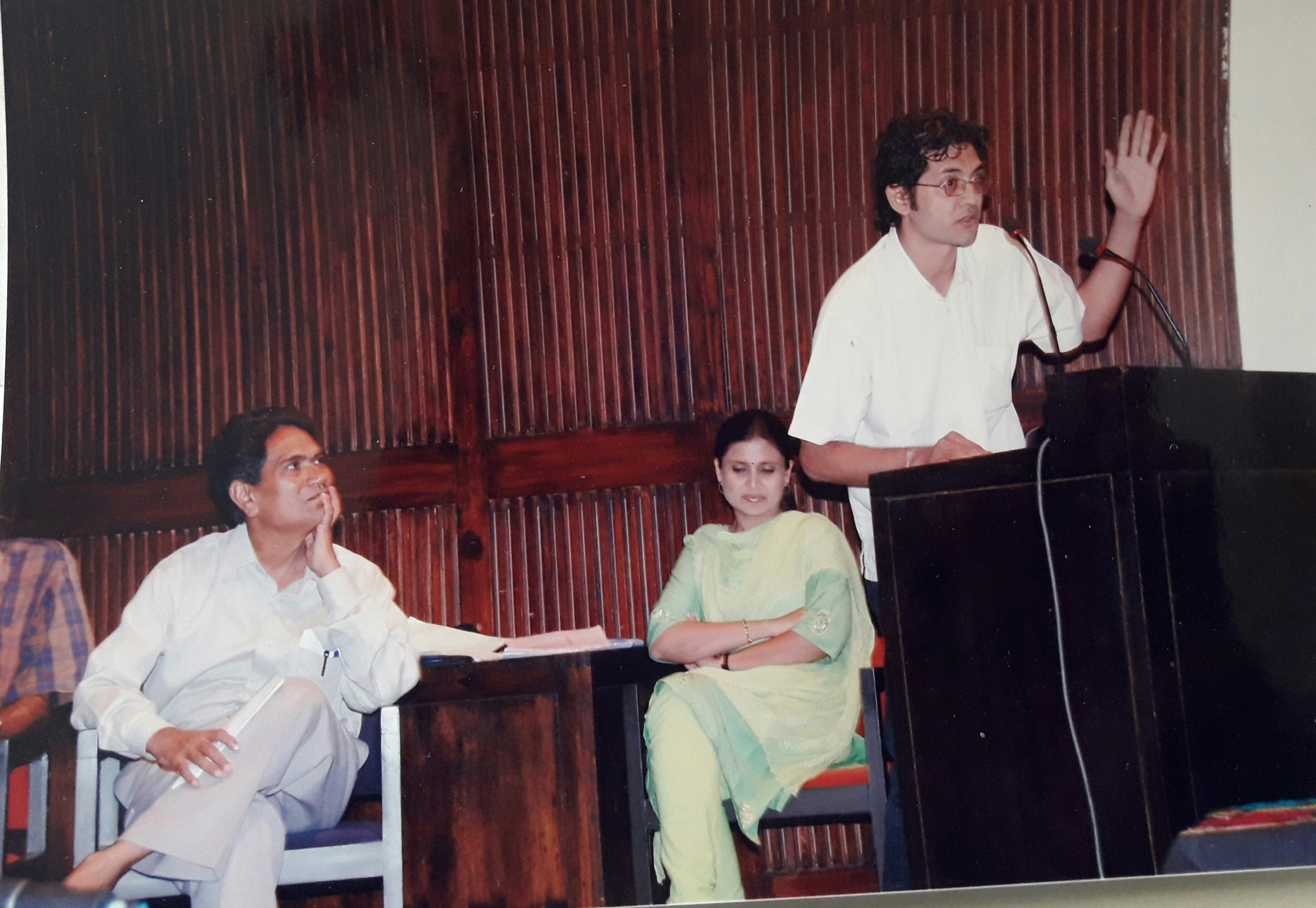
Joshi on mic, Ahmedabad, 1998

Joshi was born on 3 July 1973 in Ahmedabad, Gujarat to Jayant Joshi and Neela Joshi. He completed his primary and secondary education from Vijaynagar High School, Ahmedabad in 1990. He completed his Bachelor of Arts from H. K. Arts College, Ahmedabad in 1993 and Master of Arts from School of Languages of Gujarat University in 1995 with English literature as one of his subjects.

== Career ==
H K Arts College of Ahmedabad where he taught English literature

Joshi started his career as a Professor of English literature in his alma mater H. K. Arts College in 1995. In 2010, he founded the Fade-In Theatre with other young theatre people. He left his job as a professor in September 2011 to pursue the theatre.

Joshi started to write poems at the age of 18. His first poem was published in Kavilok. Subsequently, his poems were published in other Gujarati magazines including Shabdasrishti, Kavita, Shabdalay, Navneet Samarpan, and Kumar. He debuted in Gujarati theatre with his play Rami Lo Ne Yaar!.

== Works ==
=== Poetry ===
Greenroomma (In the Greenroom), his only collection of poems, was published in 2008. His poems are in different genres of poetry such as Ghazal, Nazm, Geet and Free verse and on different subjects such as Sex Worker, the Rana deserted by Meera, the boy at the Sivakasi fireworks factory, a shepherd named Jetho, the poor little sister, a labourer finding respite from the scorching sun beneath the gunny bag which he heaves. The book was critically acclaimed.

=== Plays ===
He debuted in Gujarati theatre with his play Rami Lo Ne Yaar!. He got critically acclaimed for his play Dost Chokkas Ahin Ek Nagar Vastu Hatu, a musical black comedy based on 2002 Gujarat riots. This play prompted The Week magazine to name Joshi as one of the 50 rising stars of India in 2003. Soon after, his play Aathma Taaru Nu Aakash became the first play from Gujarat to be selected for the prestigious Prithvi Theatre Festival in Mumbai in 2005. His other critically acclaimed and commercially successful plays are Welcome Zindagi and 102 Not out. 102 Not out is about a 102-year-old father who wants to break the world record of a Chinese man who has lived for 120 years. His other plays include Munjaro, Mahatma Bomb, Tu Tu Tu Tu Tu Tara and Dharo Ke Tame Manji Chho.

=== Films ===
His play 102 Not Out is adapted as a Hindi language Indian film 102 Not Out directed by Umesh Shukla. He is credited as a writer of the film. He also wrote dialogues and lyrics for 2018 Gujarati language film Hellaro.

== Recognition ==
Joshi won Yuva Gaurav Puraskar (2007) and Takhtasinh Parmar Prize (2008-09) for his contribution in Gujarati literature. He received Chandravadan Chimanlal Mehta Award, named after renowned Gujarati dramatist Chandravadan Mehta, in 2013 for his contribution in Gujarati theatre. He is also a recipient of the Ravji Patel Award, Balvantray Thakor Prize and Sadbhavna Award (2014).

== See also ==
- List of Gujarati-language writers
