= Parivesh (magazine) =

- Cover page of Parivesh; March, 2015 issue
- Editor in chief: Rajesh Vankar
- Co-editors: Vinu Bamania; Satish Priyadarshi
- Categories: Literature
- Frequency: Quarterly
- First issue: December 2012
- Country: India
- Based in: Panchmahal
- Language: Gujarati
- ISSN: 2319-1872

Parivesh is a quarterly literary magazine published in Gujarati language. The first issue was published in December 2012. It is edited by Rajesh Vankar.

== Content ==
The magazine publishes poetry, stories, critical essays, book reviews, plays in Gujarati. It also publishes research papers and articles on Gujarati literature, folk literature and world literature.

== See also ==
- Dalitchetna
- Shabdasrishti
