= Dalitchetna =

Gujarati magazine

- Editor: Manoj Parmar
- Categories: Dalit Literature
- Frequency: Monthly
- Format: Print
- Publisher: Manoj Parmar
- Founder: Manoj Parmar
- Founded: 2006
- First issue: 13 November 2006
- Country: India
- Based in: Chandkheda, Gandhinagar
- Language: Gujarati
- ISSN: 2319-7862

Dalitchetna (Gujarati: દલિતચેતના) is a Gujarati language monthly magazine published on 13th of every month under the editorship of Manoj Parmar. The magazine was founded in 2006 with the purpose of the blooming of Gujarati Dalit literature.

== History ==
The first issue of the magazine was published on 13 November 2006 from Chandkheda, Gandhinagar. Later, it started to give prizes to the best story and best poem published during the year.

== Content ==
Dalitchetna publishes a variety of literary genres and articles based on Dalit literature including poems, short stories, criticism, research papers, and essays.

== See also ==
- Parivesh
- Shabdasrishti
