= Gazalvishwa =

Gujarati literary journal

- Cover page of Gazalvishwa (September 2014 Issue)
- Editor: Rajesh Vyas 'Miskin'
- Former editors: Ankit Trivedi (2006 - 2007)
- Categories: Literature
- Frequency: Quarterly
- Format: Print
- Publisher: Vali Gujarati Gazal Kendra
- Founder: Government of Gujarat
- Founded: 2006
- Country: India
- Based in: Gandhinagar
- Language: Gujarati

Gazalvishwa (Gujarati: ગઝલવિશ્વ) is a quarterly Gujarati ghazal poetry journal, published by Vali Gujarati Gazal Kendra from Gandhinagar, Gujarat, India since 2006. The journal publishes ghazals, ghazal reviews, critical works and interviews of ghazal poets.

== History ==
In 2006, The Vali Gujarati Ghazal Kendra was founded for the promotion of Gujarati Ghazal as a literary form of expression and a magazine was also started under its aegis. Rajesh Vyas was a founding editor.

In 2017, it was merged into Shabdasrishti.

== See also ==
- Dhabak, quarterly Gujarati language ghazal poetry journal
- Shabdasrishti, Gujarati literary magazine
- Kavilok, Gujarati language bimonthly poetry journal
