= Geet (song) =

Poem set to music

Geet (song or lyrical poetry) (Hindi:गीत) (Urdu:گیت) in Hindi and in Urdu may refer to any poem set to music that can be sung alone or as a duet or in chorus. It has remained popular in all parts of the Indian sub-continent particularly in the Hindi and Urdu speaking areas.

In its classical form a Geet conforms to Prabandha, a composition bound by Dhatu that comprises Sthayi, Antara, Dhrupad etc.; and Anga that comprises swar, taal, pat, birud etc. Therefore, it has a beginning part known as Prabandha which is followed by an Udgraah or Dhruv which is its part that is repeatedly sung and cannot be left out. The ending part is known as Aabhog and that part of the geet which is between Dhruv and Aabhog is called Pada or Antara. Famous poet and lyricist Golendra Patel, while defining 'song', has said that "Song is the soulful voice generated by the impact of human sympathy on the string between heart and mind, that is, song is the voice of life in its soulful nature." Dhrupad, Khyal, Thumri and Ghazals are the accepted forms of Hindustani classical music. The legendary singers Mian Tansen and Raja Man Singh Tomar were Dhrupad singers.

Geets are a significant part of Indian folk-literature meant for all memorable occasions, then they are known as lok-geets sung by different communities and sections of society. These lok-geets include Chaiti, Kajari, Hori and Sawani. However, the boundary-line separating folk songs from classical songs cannot be easily traced and re-drawn.

Geets are also central to many cultures and communities across the globe and are used in a variety of contexts and purposes. Frequently, religious communities employ geets to not only express devotion but also to transmit knowledge of their faiths. For instance, in the Satpanthi Ismaili communities of South Asia (also known as Khojas), geets of devotion are composed and sung by community artistes. The Geets Portal at the University of Saskatchewan Library is a digital curation of the Ismaili community's devotional tradition of geets.

== Context ==
In Urdu poetry its roots are found in Dakhani Shairi whose most important feature is its Indian ethos with the strain being feminine, and the tone, delicate and elegant; Urdu Geets mainly speak about feminine anguish. Dakhini or Hindavi forms part of what is known as proto-Hindi Literature whose origin can be traced to a far earlier period that produced the great historical lyric Prithviraj Raso written by Chand Bardai. In Hindi poetry that has its roots in the Avadhi and the Brij Bhasha the Bhakti movement amalgamating the more ancient forms of Sanskrit and Persian poetry brought to the fore the wide range of rasas from love to heroism that later on in the Ritikal introduced erotism in a big way. Urdu geets are basically found written in the Hindustani language that took shape after the colonization of India by the British and had subsequently become the court language in Delhi and Avadh whereas Hindi geets have retained the flavour drawn from earlier compositions in Rajasthani dialect, Brij Bhasha and Maithali.
