= Yuva Puraskar =

Literary honor in India

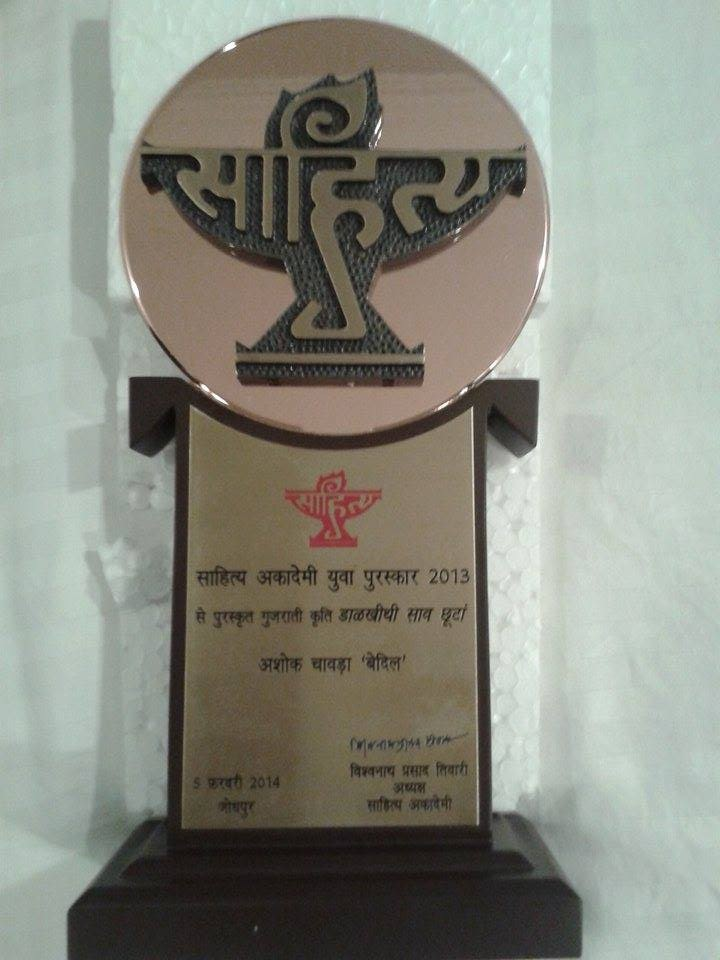
- Trophy for 2013 Yuva Puraskar in Gujarati language
- Awarded for: Contributions to Indian literature
- Sponsored by: Sahitya Akademi
- Reward: ₹50,000
- First award: 2011
- Final award: 2025

Highlights
- Total awarded: 360
- Website: Official website

The Yuva Puraskar, also known as Sahitya Akademi Yuva Puraskar, is an annual literary award conferred by Sahitya Akademi on young writers of outstanding works in 24 Indian languages. Instituted in 2011, it recognises writers under 35, with the aim of encouraging and promoting young writers.

The award comprises a cash prize of ₹50,000 and an engraved copper plaque. It is usually announced alongside Bal Sahitya Puraskar.

== Lists of recipients by languages ==
Awards are presented to 24 individuals annually from the following languages:

- List of Yuva Puraskar winners for Assamese
- List of Yuva Puraskar winners for Bengali
- List of Yuva Puraskar winners for Bodo
- List of Yuva Puraskar winners for Dogri
- List of Yuva Puraskar winners for English
- List of Yuva Puraskar winners for Gujarati
- List of Yuva Puraskar winners for Hindi
- List of Yuva Puraskar winners for Kannada
- List of Yuva Puraskar winners for Kashmiri
- List of Yuva Puraskar winners for Konkani
- List of Yuva Puraskar winners for Maithili
- List of Yuva Puraskar winners for Malayalam
- List of Yuva Puraskar winners for Manipuri
- List of Yuva Puraskar winners for Marathi
- List of Yuva Puraskar winners for Nepali
- List of Yuva Puraskar winners for Odia
- List of Yuva Puraskar winners for Punjabi
- List of Yuva Puraskar winners for Rajasthani
- List of Yuva Puraskar winners for Sanskrit
- List of Yuva Puraskar winners for Santali
- List of Yuva Puraskar winners for Sindhi
- List of Yuva Puraskar Winners for Tamil
- List of Yuva Puraskar winners for Telugu
- List of Yuva Puraskar winners for Urdu
