= Akhand Jyoti =

Monthly magazine

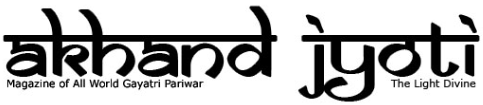
- Chief Editor: Pranav Pandya
- Categories: Scientific spirituality
- Frequency: Monthly
- Publisher: Akhand Jyoti Sansthan Mathura
- First issue: January 1938
- Country: India
- Based in: Mathura
- Language: Hindi and other
- Website: Akhand Jyoti

Akhand Jyoti is a monthly magazine published from Mathura. It was started in 1938 by Pt. Shriram Sharma Acharya, the founder of the All World Gayatri Pariwar. The main objective of the magazine is to promote scientific spirituality and the religion of 21st century—namely, scientific religion. The magazine is published in more than 10 languages and has over a million subscribers all across the globe. Akhand Jyoti covers various aspects of life, such as personality development, health management, family life, societal development, social sustainability, nation building and scientific spirituality.

== History ==
The inaugural issue of magazine was published in Vasant Panchami January 1938. It was initially launched in Hindi with a small circulation from Agra. Publication had to be halted due to a shortage of raw materials caused by World War II. It resumed in January 1940 with a print run of 500 copies. In 1941, the magazine was shifted to Mathura. Since then, it has continued without interruption. The magazine is now published in more than 10 languages.

== Editors ==
The first editor of the magazine, Pt. Shriram Sharma Acharya, founder of the All World Gayatri Pariwar, was a journalist and an active participant in the Indian freedom struggle. He had assisted Shri Krishnadatt Paliwal in the Hindi daily Sainik, where he wrote a regular column titled Matta Pralap. He authored more than three thousand books, including bhashyas (commentaries) on ancient Hindu scriptures.
In 1990, Bhagwati Devi Sharma, co-founder of the All World Gayatri Pariwar, took over the editorial responsibilities.
Pranav Pandya, Director of the Brahmavarchas Shodh Sansthan, became the chief editor in 1994 and continues to serve in this role.
