= Kiransinh Chauhan =

Gujarati Poet

- Born: Kiransinh Hirabhai Chauhan; 7 October 1974 (age 51); Surat, Gujarat, India
- Education: Veer Narmad South Gujarat University
- Occupations: poet, scriptwriter, anchor
- Spouse: Smita (2003 - present)
- Children: Pallav, Namra
- Writing career
- Language: Gujarati
- Years active: 1988 - present
- Genres: ghazal, Hazal, free verse, Geet
- Notable works: Smaranotsav (2004); Mijaj (2008)
- Notable awards: Shayda Award (2005)

Signature
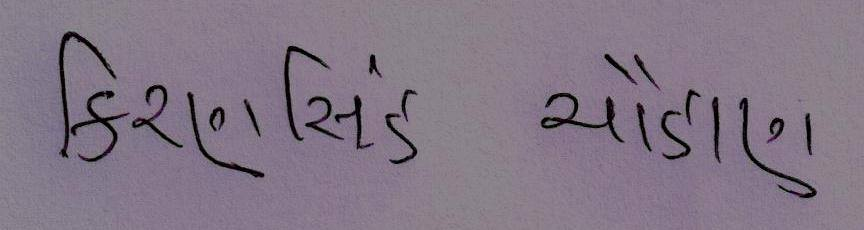

Kiransinh Chauhan (born 7 October 1974) is a Gujarati poet and scriptwriter from Gujarat, India.

His works include Smaranotsav (Festival of Memories, 2004) and Mijaj (The Temper, 2008). He was awarded the Shayda Award in 2005.

== Early life ==
Chauhan was born in Surat, Gujarat to Hirabhai and Revabahen. After completing his primary education at Variyav Primary School, he completed his secondary and higher secondary education at Lokmanya Vidyalaya, Rander. He completed B. A. in 1997 from J. Z. Shah Arts and H. P. Desai Commerce College, Amroli and M. A. from M. T. B. Arts College, Surat with Gujarati literature as one of his subjects. He earned B. P. Ed. in 2002 from Sharirik Prashikshan Mahavidyalay, Tumsar, Maharashtra. In 2005, he completed his B.Ed. from the College of Education.

== Career ==
Chauhan started writing poetry in 1988, venturing into metrical form in 1990. In the same year, his poem, "Hu Moto Thai Gayo" appeared in Navnirman periodical, published in Surat. His poetry was published in other Gujarati literary magazines including Shabdasrishti, Gazalvishwa, Dhabak, Kavita, Kumar, Kavilok and Navneet Samarpan. He worked as a journalist for five years and as a teacher for seven years. He joined Navgujarat Times in 1997 as a journalist. In 1999, he joined Pratinidhi Patra and then Channel Surat in 2001. From 2002 to 2006, he taught Gujarati and Sanskrit languages at Jivanbharati Vidyalaya, Surat. In 2006, he joined P. R. Khatiwala Vidyasankul, Surat. He served as a lecturer at the Valmiki Adhyapan Mandir P. T. C. College, Surat for a year. He is working as a scriptwriter and an anchor. He is also running his own book publishing house Sanidhya Prakashan since 2010.

== Works ==
His first ghazal anthology, Smaranotsav (Festival of Memories) was published in 2004, followed by Mijaj (The Temper) published in 2008. Fanfa Na Maar (2005) is a collection of Hazal, a humorous styled ghazal, written by him. He has penned lyrics for Gujarati film Chaar (2011) and also wrote dialogues for Gujarati film Aapane To Dhirubhai. He has appeared in several television shows including Doordarshan and on Akashvani.

=== Compilations ===
- Matlanagar (collection of selected Gujarati matla, first two lines of a ghazal)
- Urmisabhar Achhandas Kavyo (collection of free verse)
- Marmbhari Matuki (collection of parables)
- Mahesh Davadkarni Manmohak Ghazalo (selected ghazal poems by Mahesh Davadkar)

== Recognition ==
He was awarded the Shayda Award (2005) by Indian National Theater, Mumbai. He is also a recipient of Shreshth Yuva Sahityakar Puraskar (Best Young Author Prize) in 2007 by Rashtriya Kala Kendra, Surat.

== Personal life ==
Chauhan married Smita on 18 February 2003 and they have two sons, Pallav and Namra.

== See also ==
- List of Gujarati-language writers
