= Pandya (surname) =

Pandya is an Indian Hindu Brahmin surname and may be:

- Arvind Pandya (1923–1980), Indian actor
- Ashish Pandya, Indian police service officer
- Bhanuprasad Pandya, Indian poet and critic
- Bharat Pandya, Indian politician
- Bhogilal Pandya, Indian social worker
- Chetna Pandya, English actress
- Darshan Pandya, Indian actor
- Deepak Pandya (1932–2020), Indian-American neuroanatomist
- Dilip Pandya, Indian politician
- Hardik Pandya, Indian international cricketer
- Haren Pandya, Indian politician
- Himanshu Pandya, professor of botany at Gujarat University
- Jitendra Pandya, Indian politician
- Kailash Pandya, American theatre artist
- Krunal Pandya, Indian international cricketer
- Mohanlal Pandya, Indian freedom fighter
- Mukesh Pandya, Indian politician
- Nalin Kumar Pandya, Indian filmmaker
- Natwarlal Pandya (1920–2011), Indian poet
- Navalram Pandya (1836–1888), British India Gujarati-language author
- Niranjan Pranshankar Pandya (born 1945), Indian social worker
- Paritosh Pandya, Indian computer scientist
- Prabodhkant Pandya (died 2021), Indian politician
- Pranav Pandya, politician
- Pranav Pandya (AWGP), head of All World Gayatri Pariwar
- Pravin Pandya, Indian poet
- Rajnikumar Pandya, Indian Gujarati-language writer
- Sejalben Pandya, Indian politician
- Shailendra Pandya, Indian human rights activist
- Shawna Pandya, Canadian medical doctor
- Sunil K. Pandya (1940–2024), Indian neurosurgeon
- Sunita Williams(nee Sunita Pandya), USA Astronaut
- Vidhi Pandya, Indian television actress
- Vidya Sagar Pandya, Indian banker and politician
- Vishal Pandya, Indian film director and screenwriter
