= Pandya (disambiguation) =

The Pandya dynasty was a state in modern-day southern India and northern Sri Lanka.

Pandya can also refer to:

- Pandya (surname)
- Pandya kingdom (Mahabharata), kingdom mentioned in the Mahabharata
- 30324 Pandya, minor planet

== See also ==
- All the Best Pandya, 2011 Indian Gujarati family drama film
- Eupterote pandya, moth species
- Pandya Nadu, historical region in Tamil Nadu, India
- Pandya theorem, theorem in nuclear physics
- Pandya Store, Indian television series
