= Vitan Sud Beej =

1989 anthology of poems written by Ramesh Parekh

- Cover page
- Author: Ramesh Parekh
- Cover artist: Amit K. Parekh
- Language: Gujarati
- Genre: Ghazal, free verse, geet
- Published: 1989
- Publisher: Gujarat Sahitya Akademi, Gandhinagar
- Publication place: India
- Media type: Print (Paperback)
- Pages: 192
- Awards: Sahitya Akademi Award (1994)
- OCLC: 20454651
- Dewey Decimal: 891.471

Vitan Sud Beej (Gujarati: વિતાન સુદ બીજ) is an anthology of poems written by Ramesh Parekh in the Gujarati language. The book won the Sahitya Akademi Award for Gujarati in 1994.

== History ==
The book was published in 1989 by Gujarat Sahitya Akademi. Later, the poems in this book were included in Chha Aksharnu Naam ("Name of Six Alphabet"), the complete works of Ramesh Parekh, published by Gujarat Sahitya Akademi.

== Content ==
The book consists of 59 ghazals; 6 muktak; 24 free verse and 99 geet poems, composed in a colloquial language. It includes the poem "Ek Sanyukta Geet", which was composed in collaboration with Anil Joshi, the Gujarati author, on 6 October 1985.

== Awards ==
The book was awarded the Sahitya Akademi Award of 1994 from the Sahitya Akademi, New Delhi. It also received the Rajkumar Bhuvalka Award from Bharatiya Bhasha Parishad, Calcutta.
