= Bhavin Gopani =

Gujarati poet (born 1976)

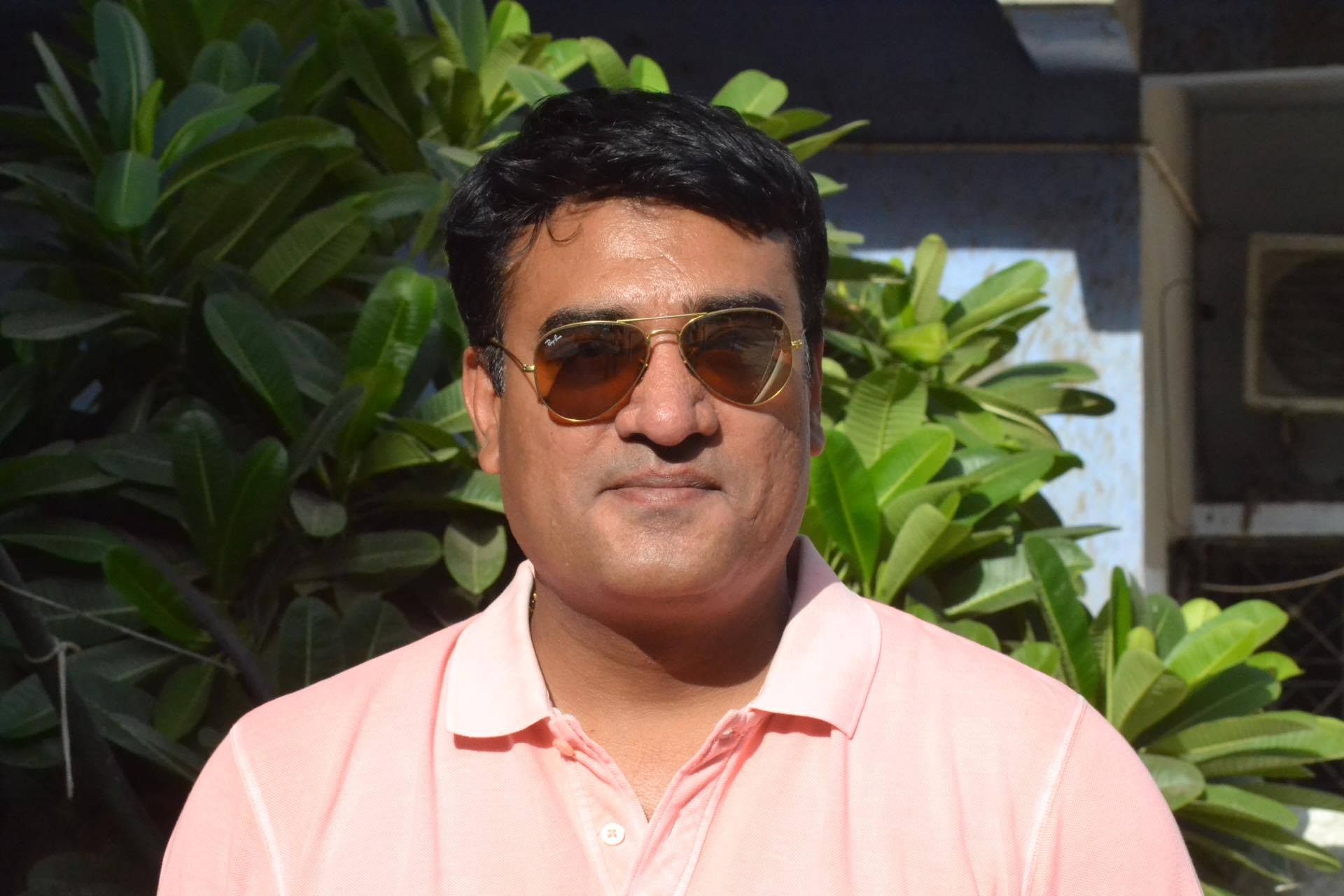
- Bhavin Gopani at his home in Ahmedabad on 5 June 2016
- Born: Bhavin Bipinchandra Gopani; April 19, 1976 (age 50); Ahmedabad, Gujarat
- Education: Gujarat University (B.Comm.)
- Occupation: Poet
- Spouse: Kailas (1999 - predent)
- Writing career
- Language: Gujarati
- Years active: 2011 - present
- Genre: Ghazal
- Notable works: Umbaro (2016); Orado (2016)
- Notable awards: Shayda Award (2016)

Signature
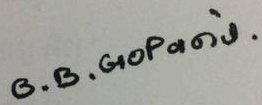

Bhavin Gopani is a Gujarati language ghazal poet from Gujarat, India. His significant works include Umbaro (2016) and Orado (2016), collections of ghazals. The INT - Indian National Theater, Mumbai, awarded him the Shayda Award in 2016 for his contributions to Gujarati ghazal poetry.

== Life ==
Bhavin was born on 19 April 1976 in Ahmedabad, Gujarat, to Bipinchandra and Jyotsanabahen. He received his schooling at various schools within Ahmedabad, including Prakash Balmandir, Durga Vidyalay, and Sardar Patel High School. He completed his Bachelor of Commerce in 1996 from Sahjanand College, Ahmedabad.
He married Kailas on 11 February 1999; they have a daughter.

== Contribution ==
He started writing ghazals in 2011 and was first published in 2013 in Kavita, a Gujarati-language bimonthly magazine. Subsequently, his poems were published in many Gujarati magazines, including Kavilok, Gazalvishwa, Dhabak and Parab. Umbaro (2016) and Orado (2016) are two of his collections of ghazals.

== Recognition ==
He received the Shayda Award in 2016.

== See also ==
- List of Gujarati-language writers
