= Shayda Award =

Annual Gujarati youth ghazal poetry award

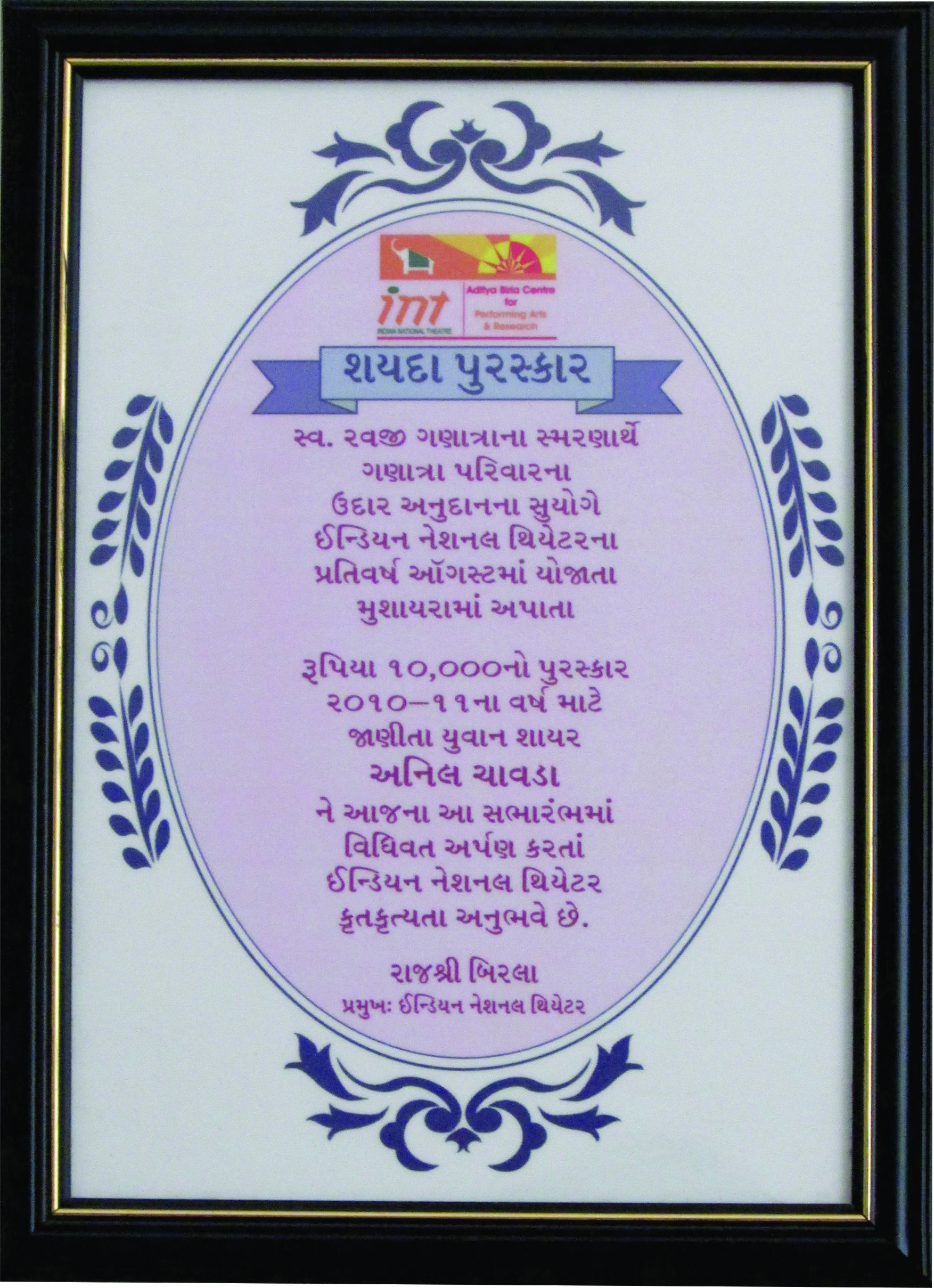
- Certificate of Shayda Award
- Awarded for: Excellence in ghazal poetry
- Sponsored by: INT Aditya Birla Centre for Performing Arts & Research
- Country: India
- Reward: Rs. 10,000
- First award: 1998
- Final award: 2019
- Currently held by: Harshvi Patel
- Website: http://www.int-abc.org

Shayda Award (Gujarati:શયદા ઍવોર્ડ) is an annual award given to a young Gujarati ghazal poet. It was founded by the INT Aditya Birla Centre for Performing Arts & Research. The award is named after Gujarati ghazal poet Harji Lavji Damani, known by his pen name Shayda. A prize of ₹ 10000 is awarded to recognize and promote Gujarati ghazal poets.

== Recipients ==
The Shayda Award has been granted annually since 1998 to the following people:

| Year | Recipient |
|---|---|
| 1998 | Sanju Vala |
| 1999 | Vivek Kane 'Sahaj' |
| 2000 | Mukesh Joshi |
| 2001 | Raeesh Maniar |
| 2002 | Shobhit Desai |
| 2003 | Rashid Meer |
| 2004 | Makarand Musale |
| 2005 | Kiransinh Chauhan |
| 2006 | Hiten Anandpara |
| 2008 | Ankit Trivedi |
| 2009 | Gaurang Thaker |
| 2010 | Harsh Brahmbhatt |
| 2011 | Anil Chavda |
| 2012 | Chandresh Makwana |
| 2013 | Bharat Vinzuda |
| 2014 | Bhavesh Bhatt |
| 2015 | Jigar Joshi 'Prem' |
| 2016 | Bhavin Gopani |
| 2017 | Snehi Parmar |
| 2018 | Hemant Punekar |
| 2019 | Pranav Pandya |
| 2025 | Harshvi Patel |

== See also ==
- Kalapi Award
