= Pranav Pandya (AWGP) =

Head of AWGP

Pranav Pandya is Hindu religious leader and physician who is the head of All World Gayatri Pariwar and Chancellor of Dev Sanskriti Vishwavidyalaya. He is the son-in-law of Shriram Sharma. He is also the member of Yug Nirman Yojana and currently serving as Chief Editor of Akhand Jyoti. In 1997, he attend Hindu New Year festival in United States along with Atal Bihari Vajpayee.

== Award and honours ==
- In 2013, he got Tarun Kranti Award.
- In 2014, he got Pride of India award from Parliament of the United Kingdom
- In 2016, he was nominated for Rajya Sabha by Narendra Modi, Prime Minister of India.
