= Vivek Kane =

Vivek Kane 'Sahaj'
- વિવેક અનિલ કાણે
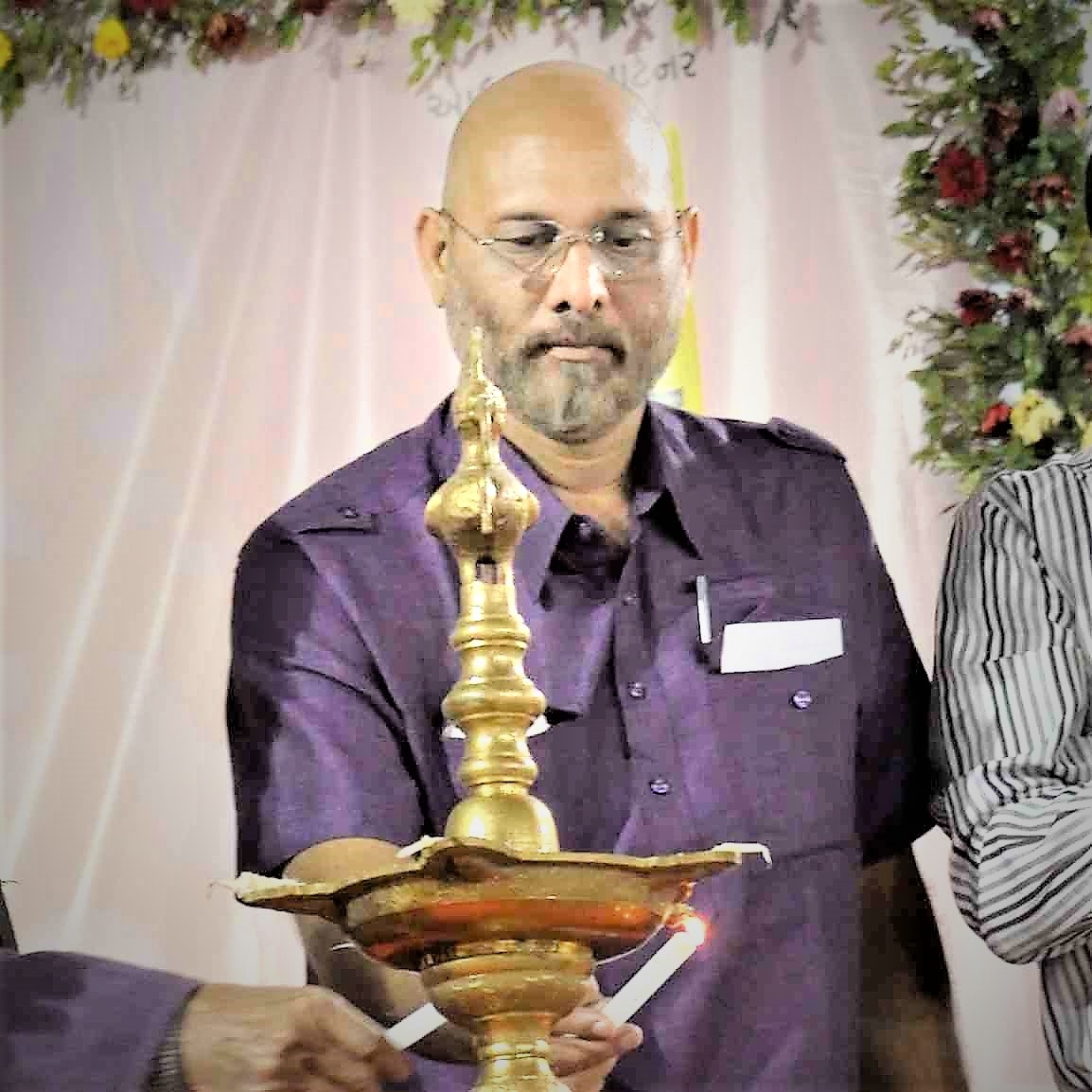
- Born: Vivek Anil Kane; 16 March 1967 (age 59); Pune, Maharashtra
- Education: B.E., M.B.A.
- Alma mater: Maharashtra Institute of Technology, University of Pune
- Occupations: Poet, Writer, Translator
- Spouse: Aparna Kane (1994–present)
- Children: Sopan (Son), Nachiket (Son)
- Writing career
- Pen name: Sahaj
- Language: Gujarati, Urdu
- Years active: 1992–present
- Genres: Ghazal, Free-verse Poems, Plays, Essays, Articles
- Notable work: Kathpootali (2010)
- Notable awards: Shayda Award (1999), Bharat Ratna Dr P V Kane Award (2011), Mareez Award for poetry (2012)

Signature
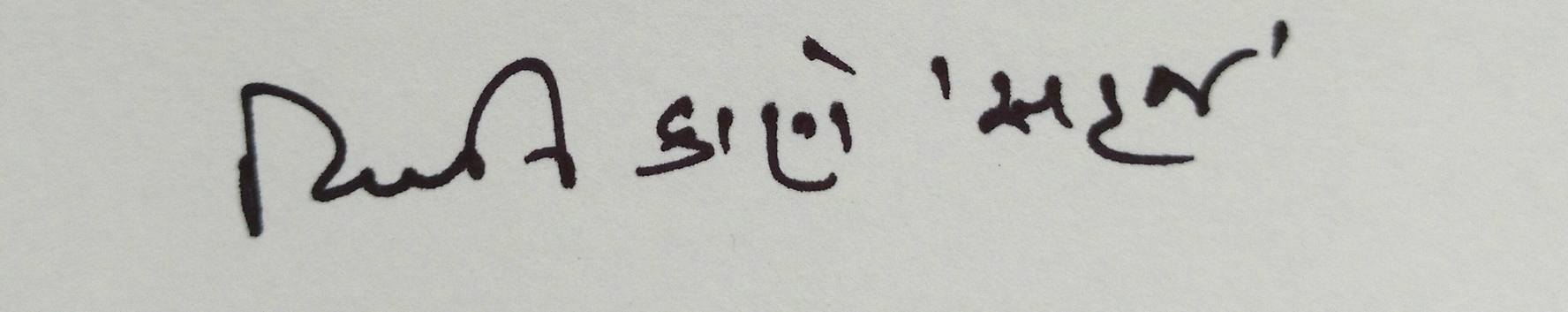

Vivek Kane, also known by his pen name Sahaj, is a Gujarati poet, writer and translator from Gujarat, India. His notable works include Anubhuti (2004) and Kathpootali (The puppet; 2010). He was awarded the prestigious Shayda Award (for 1999), in January 2000, at Bharatiya Vidyabhavan, Mumbai, for his contribution in Gujarati poetry. He is also the recipient of Bharatratna Dr P V Kane Award (2011) and Mareez Award for poetry (2012). Kane has authored a book on Leadership titled ESOL - Effective Success-Oriented Leadership.

A Mechanical Engineer by education, Kane also holds a Master's in Finance. He has held top leadership positions with many international organizations. As the CEO of KANE Consult, he has been coaching and mentoring many CEOs and Business Leaders on Strategic Management and Leadership.

As a technocrat, Kane has presented papers on Renewable Energy and Nanotechnology at several international seminars, conferences, symposia and other fora the world over. He is a prominent speaker on Organizational Culture, Strategy and Leadership; and has traveled to over 50 countries in the world.

Kane is a Gujarati poet and a playwright. Kane's poetry, scholarly articles and plays are regularly published in reputed Gujarati magazines and journals. He is frequently invited to recite poetry all over the world.

Kane's creative quest in poetry, literature and music has seemingly complemented his strategic and leadership thought; and vice versa.

== Early life ==
Kane was born on 16 March 1967 in Pune, to Anil Kane and Usha Kane. He is a resident of Vadodara. After taking his primary education from IPCL school, Vadodara, he completed his Std. 12 from A.G. High School, Ahmedabad, in 1984. He received his B.E. (Mechanical) in 1988 from the Maharashtra Institute of Technology, Pune. He also holds an M.B.A. in Finance. Kane married Aparna on 27 January 1994.

== Career ==
A Mechanical Engineer by education, Kane also holds a Master's in Finance. He has held top leadership positions with many international organizations. As the CEO of KANE Consult, he has been coaching and mentoring many CEOs and Business Leaders on Strategic Management and Leadership.

Kane is a Gujarati poet and playwright. His poetry, scholarly articles, and plays are published in various Gujarati magazines and journals. A resident of Vadodara, he has given poetry reading internationally.

== Works ==
His pen name Sahaj means easy, effortless or natural in Gujarati. He writes in both Gujarati and Urdu. He published his first collection of ghazals Kathpootali (The Puppet) in 2010, which was critically acclaimed by several Gujarati writers and poets including Khalil Dhantejvi, Bhagvatikumar Sharma, Rajesh Vyas 'Miskin', Rashid Meer and Vinod Joshi. He has translated the selected Gujarati poems into Marathi with Mangesh Padgaonkar. This work was published as Anubhuti (2004). He has also translated two one-act plays of P. L. Deshpande into Gujarati.

== Recognition ==
He was awarded the Shayda Award in 1999 for his contribution to Gujarati ghazal poetry. He is also a recipient of Bharatratna P. V. Kane Award (2011) and Mareez Award (2012).

== See also ==
- List of Gujarati-language writers
