= Bhagwati Devi Sharma =

Indian social reformer (1926–1994)

Mataji Bhagwati Devi Sharma
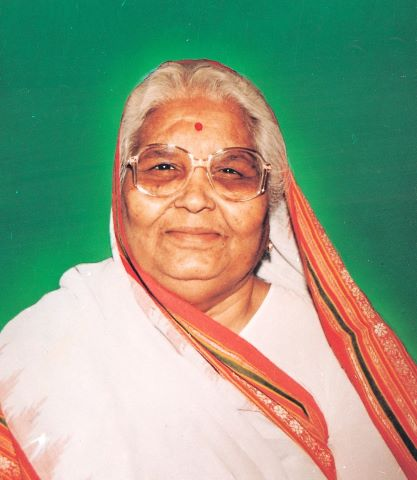
- Born: 20 September 1926
- Died: 19 September 1994 (aged 67); Shantikunj
- Organization: AWGP
- Predecessor: Shriram Sharma
- Movement: Yug Nirman Yojana and Mahila Jagran Abhiyan
- Spouse: Shriram Sharma
- Children: Shailbala Pandya and Mrityunjay Sharma
- Relatives: Pranav Pandya (Son in Law)

Bhagwati Devi Sharma was an Indian social reformer who was the co-founder of AWGP and patron founder of Akhand Jyoti.

== Personal life ==
Bhagvati Devi married Shriram Sharma in 1946. She assisted him in managing All World Gayatri Pariwar (AWGP) and after his death, she succeeded him as head of AWGP. Her followers call her Mataji (transl. respected mother).

== Honors ==
- A school in Jhansi is named after her.
- Her death anniversary was celebrated in Giridih.
- In her death anniversary, 105 lamps were lighted in Shantikunj.
- Her death anniversary is celebrated as Prakaatya Diwas in Jharkhand.
- On 31st October 2026, Department of Post released a commemorative postage stamp to mark birth centenary of Mata Bhagwati Devi Sharma.
