= Sanju Vala =

Indian Gujarati-language poet and literary critic (Born: 1960)

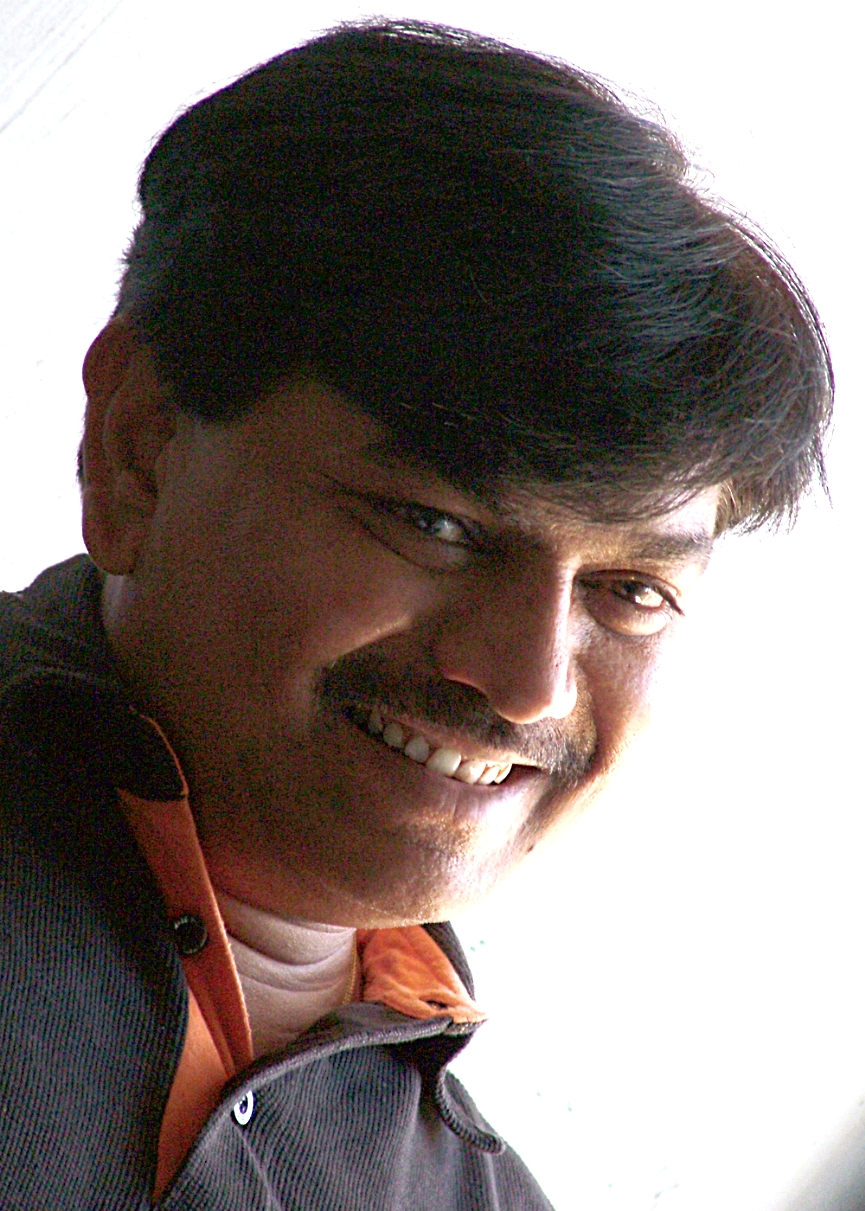
- Sanju Vala
- Born: Sanju Naranbhai Vala; 11 July 1960 (age 66); Badhada, Savarkundla, Amreli, Gujarat, India
- Occupations: Poet, critic
- Writing career
- Language: Gujarati
- Years active: Since 1983
- Notable works: Kaik/Kashunk/Athava To (1990); Killebandhi (2000); Ragadhinam (2007)
- Notable awards: Shayda Award - 1999; Harindra Dave Memorial Award - 2014
- Sanju Vala's voice intro

Signature
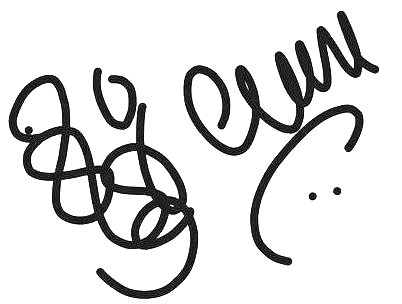

Sanju Vala (b. 11 July 1960) is an Indian Gujarati-language poet and literary critic Gujarat, India. He has authored more than 10 books and received numerous literary awards.

== Early life ==
Sanju Vala was born in Badhada (Savarkundla) village in Amreli district of Gujarat, to Naranbhai and Ranima. He completed his primary education from Badhada Primary School in 1976. He completed schooling in 1979 from J.V Modi Highschool, Savarkundla. He dropped out of college after studying for a year.

== Career ==
Sanju Vala joined the revenue department of the Government of Gujarat in 1979. He served as a member in working committee of Gujarati Sahitya Parishad from 2012 to 2014. He was a member of the working committee of Vali Gujarati Gazalkendra run by Gujarat Sahitya Akademi. He wrote columns for several newspapers, such as Janmabhoomi and Phulchhab. His poems were published in several literary magazines including Shabdasrishti, Parab, Sameepe, Etad, Parivesh, Navneet Samarpan and Gazalvishwa. As a poet, he organised and participated in mushairas, poet meetings and lectures on poetry appreciation and criticism. He has written poetry and its criticism. He has authored more than 10 books and received numerous literary awards.

== Works ==
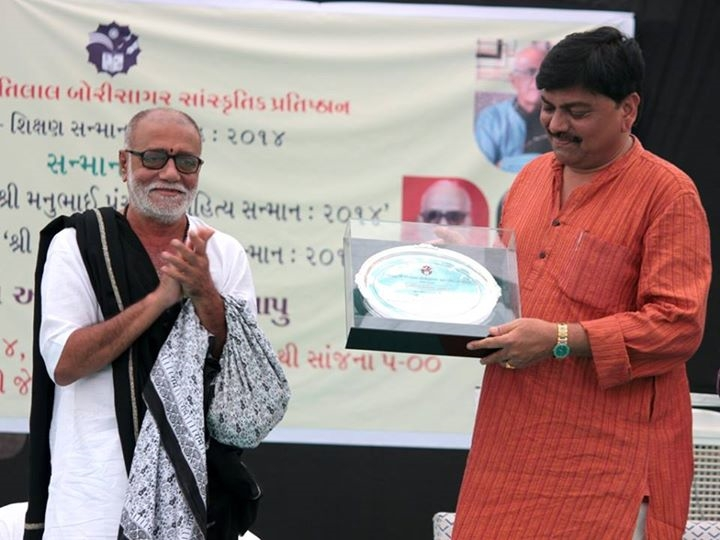
Sanju Vala with Morari bapu Darshak Sahitya Sanman – 2014

Vala started his career writing ghazals and later ventured into other forms of poetry. His main contribution is towards Geet, ghazals and Achhandas (free verse poetry). Harish Meenashru and Manilal H. Patel appreciated his style of rhythm by commenting that his songs are path-breaking and fresh among age-old patterns of rhythm. At that time when most of the ghazal-poets used to write in straightforward and loud tones, he wrote against flow of predominant style of writing ghazals and established poetry with fresh language.

== Recognition ==
Sanju Wala seeks awareness of the multiple states of consciousness through multiple verse forms. He is adept at the lyrical and has a flair for Gazals. His songs reflect saurashtra diction. He experiments with meters like Kataav that are flexible or with free verse. He can be flippant while retaining a sharp eye to notice minute and missed details of everyday life. Oppressive pain and explosive violence in several of his poems are inevitable on a journey to the centre of existence. We were born during the years of hope and aspirations. Sanju was born in 1960 during the period of national frustrations. But the future of Gujarati poetry rests in the poets like him.

— Dileep Jhaveri (A Tale of Modern Gujarati Poetry, Muse India, Issue 11)

He was awarded the Jayant Pathak Poetry Award for his anthology kaik/kashunk/athava to in 1990. For his contribution in Gujarati ghazal poetry, he was awarded by Shayda Award in 1999. He received R.V Pathak/Nanalal Kavita Paritoshik in 2003 and Dr.Bhanuprasad Pandya Award for his anthology Ragadhinam in 2007 by Gujarati Sahitya Parishad, Darshak Sahitya Sanman-2014 by Vidhyaguru Ratilal Borisagar Sanskrutik Pratishthan, Kavishree Ramesh Parekh Sanman-2014 by Asmita Foundation, Rajkot and Harindra Dave Memorial Award in 2014.

== Bibliography ==
- Kaik/Kashunk/Athava To... (collection of poems), 1990
- Atikrami Te Gazal (gazals of poets from Rajkot), 1990
- Kinshukalay (Compilation of ghazals of new generation)
- Killebandhi (long poem and Freeverse), 2000
- Ragadhinam (poem-songs), 2007
- Ghar same sarovar (Collected poetry of Shyam Sadhu), 2009, Published by Gujarat Sahitya Akademi.
- Kavitachayan-2007 (Selected Gujarati poems of 2007) published by Gujarati Sahitya Parishad.
- Yaadno Rajyabhishek (Selected gazals of Shoonya Palanpuri), 2012, published by Gujarat Sahitya Akademi.
- Manpanchamna Melama (Collected poetry of Ramesh Parekh), 2013, published by Gujarat Sahitya Akademi.
- Kavita name sanjeevani (collection of gazals) 2014.

== See also ==
- List of Gujarati-language writers
