= Shyam Sadhu =

- શામળદાસ મુળદાસ સોલંકી
- Born: Shamaldas Muldas Solanki; 15 June 1941; Junagadh
- Died: 16 December 2001 (aged 60)
- Occupation: Poet
- Writing career
- Pen name: Shyam Sadhhu
- Language: Gujarati
- Years active: 1973 - 2001
- Period: modern Gujarati literature
- Genres: Ghazal, Free verse
- Notable work: Ghar Same Sarovar (2009)
- Notable awards: Kavi Shekhadam Abuwala Award; Babasaheb Ambedkar Award

Shyam Sadhu, born Shamaldas Muldas Solanki, was a Gujarati poet from India.

== Life ==
Sadhu was born on 15 June 1941 at Junagadh, Gujarat, to Muldas Solanki. His grandmother Motibai was a bhajan singer who had published a few audio records. He completed his primary education in Junagadh. He studied ayurveda for two years, but dropped out due to family problems. Sadhu started writing poems in 1955 at the age of 15. He eventually was associated with the local politics of Junagadh, but is most known for his poetry, which was first published 18 years after he started to write. Sadhu died on 16 December 2001.

== Works ==
Sadhu is considered to be one of the most important Gujarati ghazal poets. He experimented with new metres and used a conversational style in ghazal. Along with ghazals, he wrote free verse.

Yayavari, his first collection of poems, was published in 1973, followed by Thoda Bija Kavyo, Indradhanush (1987), Atmakathana Pana (1991; "Pages of Autobiography") and Sanj Dhali Gayi (2002). His complete poems were compiled and published by Sanju Vala as Ghar Same Sarovar in 2009.

== Awards ==
He received the Kavi Shekhadam Abuwala Award and the Babasaheb Ambedkar Award.
