= Pranav Pandya =

Gujarati poet from India

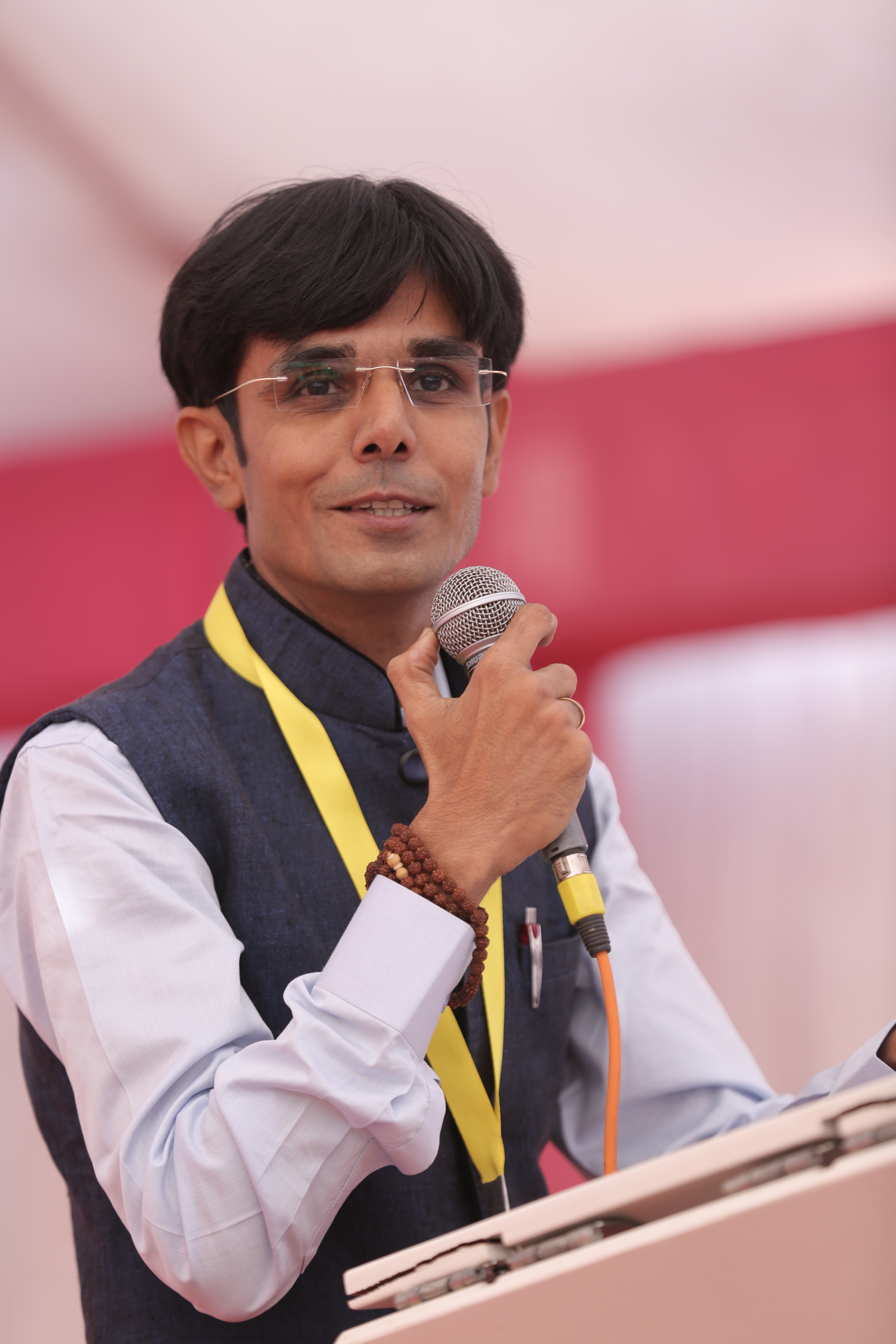
- Born: Pranav Vinodbhai Pandya; 16 March 1976; Amreli, Gujarat, India
- Education: M.A., M.Phil.
- Occupations: writer, poet and columnist
- Writing career
- Language: Gujarati
- Years active: 1998–present
- Notable awards: Ravji Patel Award (2013); Shayda Award (2019)

Pranav Vinodbhai Pandya is a Gujarati-language writer, poet and columnist from Gujarat, India. In 2013, he received Kavi Ravji Patel Yuva Sahitya Pratibha Award, instituted by Gujarat Samachar. In 2019, the Indian National Theatre awarded him the Shayda Award for his contribution to Gujarati poetry.

== Biography ==
Pranav Pandya was born on 16 March 1976, on the day of Dhuleti, in Amreli. He completed his primary and secondary education in Amreli. He graduated from Pratapray Arts College, Amreli in 1997, and completed his Master of Arts from the department of English of Saurashtra University in 1999, with English literature. He received B.Ed. from D.G.T. College, Aliyabada. In 2006, he earned M.Phil. for his thesis 'Angreji ane Sanskrut Kavyashastra Ma Prastut Kavya Vyakhya, Hetu ane Prayojanano Tulanatmak Abhyas' submitted to Saurashtra University.

From 2002, Pandya has been working as an assistant teacher in Shri M.K.C. Girls High School, Chalala. He is one of the trustees of Narsinh Mehta Sahitya Nidhi Trust, Junagadh.

== Works ==
Pandya started writing poetry in 1993. Kavita Thi Vadhu Kai Nahi, his collection of poems was published in 2013. It contains 55 ghazals, 20 geets, and 5 free verse. The book was critically acclaimed by Ramesh Parekh and Ankit Trivedi.

He edited the three volumes of Manpanchamna Melama (2013), collected poetry of Ramesh Parekh, in collaboration with Sanju Vala and Arvind Bhatt. It was published by Gujarat Sahitya Academy. He also edited ...Ne Sambhare Kalapi (2002) which was based on poet Kalapi.

Since 2014, Pandya has been writing a weekly column, Shwaas Nu Recharge, in Phulchhab. He has been writing columns in Janmabhumi and Kutchmitra since 2016. The articles published in Phulchhab were later compiled and published in his book Shwaas Nu Recharge (2015). The next volumes of these articles was published under the title Man No Talktime in 2016 by Navajivan Publications. Both books were reviewed by Raghuveer Chaudhari in Divya Bhaskar, who praised it for author's study of contemporary Gujarati literature.

For Pandya's poetry, Gujarati poet Ramesh Parekh noted that "Pranav Pandya has to be noted in Gujarati literature for his concrete poetic voice".

== Awards ==
In 2019, the Indian National Theatre awarded him the Shayada Award for his contribution in Gujarati poetry. In the same year, he was awarded Rajvi Kavi Kalapi Sanman. He is also a recipient of Kavi Ravji Patel Yuva Sahitya Pratibha Award (2013), instituted by Gujarat Samachar.

== Publications ==
- ...Ne Sambhare Kalapi (2002), based on poet Kalapi
- Kavita Thi Vadhu Kai Nahi (2013), collection of poems
- Manpanchamna Melama (2013), collected poetry of Ramesh Parekh (co-edited with Sanju Vala and Arvind Bhatt)
- Shwaas Nu Recharge (2015), collection of essays
- Man No Talktime (2016), collection of essays

== See also ==
- List of Gujarati-language writers
