= Dev Sanskriti Vishwavidyalaya =

Private university in Uttarakhand, India

- Motto: सा प्रथमा संस्कृतिर्विश्ववारा
- Motto in English: A University for the Global, Cultural & Spiritual Renaissance
- Type: Private university
- Established: 2002
- Founder: Dr. Pranav Pandya
- Parent institution: Shantikunj, Haridwar
- Affiliations: UGC, DEC, MHRD, NAAC
- Chancellor: Dr. Pranav Pandya
- Vice-Chancellor: Sharad Pardhi
- Academic staff: 100+(Full Time)
- Undergraduates: 500
- Postgraduates: 200
- Doctoral students: 20
- Location: Haridwar, Uttarakhand, 249411, India; 29°59′53″N 78°11′34″E
- Campus: Suburban
- Language: English, Hindi
- Acronym: DSVV
- Website: dsvv.ac.in

Dev Sanskriti Vishwavidyalaya (Dev Sanskriti, or simply "DSVV") is a private university located in Haridwar, Uttarakhand, India. Run by Vedmata Gayatri Trust, Shantikunj, Haridwar (headquarters of All World Gayatri Pariwar), it provides various degree, diploma and certificate courses in areas like clinical psychology, Yogic science, alternative therapy, Indian culture, tourism, rural management, theology, spiritual counseling etc.

== Brahmavarchas Shodh Sansthan ==
Brahmavarchas Shodh Sansthan, or Brahmavarchas Research Institute (in English) is situated on the bank of the Ganges, about half a kilometer from Shantikunj, Haridwar, in India. Equipped with a state of the art laboratory, a library and a botanical garden containing rare ayurvedic herbs, the institute is working on unique projects such as Yagyopathy, Ayurveda and Vedic mantras

Pandit Shriram Sharma Acharya established the Institute as a center for inter communion of science and spirituality, where interrelation between these two aspects is studied. The prime aim of setting up this Institute is to establish the ancient Indian Yogic Philosophy as the science and art of living.

The Institute is dedicated to the integration of modern and ancient Indian sciences in a practical way motivated by the goal of health and happiness for all. Innovative scientific research aimed at grassroots applications is being carried out in the ancient sciences in collaboration with the relevant modern sciences. Major areas of research include Ayurveda and Yagyopathy, total psychology, the science of Vedic mantras and its therapeutic applications, the philosophy and science of yoga, Sadhana, mantra and tantra and the science of spirituality.

The Institute houses well-equipped laboratories of hematology, biochemistry, neurophysiology, cardiology, phytochemistry, psychometry, Yagyopathy etc. Apart from its own team of doctors, engineers, scientists and philosophers, the center has live interaction with the hospital, ayurvedic pharmacy and yoga laboratories of Shantikunj, some of the hospitals and universities in and around Haridwar. Distinguished researchers, professors and other experts also visit the center regularly.

The Institute has been conducting scientific experiments to investigate the effects of Ayurveda and herbal medicine, yog sadhana, yajna, gayatri-sadhana and panch karma, on different bodily and mental functions. The subjects (experimental and the control groups) are the trainees of the sadhana programmes/camps of spiritual refinement and personality development organized regularly at Shantikunj.

== See also ==
- Sanskriti University
