= Vidya Sagar Pandya =

Indian banker and politician

Vidya Sagar Pandya was an Indian banker and politician.

== Personal life ==
He was born at Multan in 1876. His father was Pandit Basant Ram, an auditor. His ancestors included Accountants, Dealers and Bankers financing Governments and the aristocracy. He was educated at Hindu College, Vizagapatam, Christian College, Lahore and Government College, Lahore.

== Career ==
He began working at his father's firm 'Basant Ram and Sons'.

In 1903 he joined the Peoples' Bank of India at Karachi as a Manager. In 1905 he became Manager of the Banks Head Office at Lahore. In 1907 he joined the Indian Bank, Madras as Secretary. He was one of the founders of the Southern India Chamber of Commerce, Madras.

In 1930 he became a member of the Central Legislative Assembly, nominated by Madras Indian Commerce.
