= Shriram Sharma =

Indian sage and scholar (1911–1990)

Pandit Shriram Sharma 'Acharya'
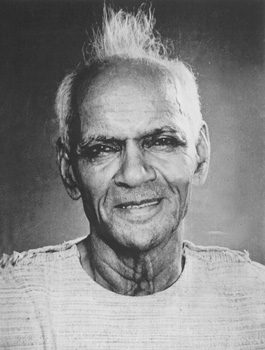
- Title: Vedmurti, Taponishtha, Yugrishi

Personal life
- Born: 20 September 1911 Anwalkheda, Agra, Uttar Pradesh
- Died: 2 June 1990 (aged 78) Shantikunj, Haridwar, Uttrakhand
- Spouse: Bhagwati Devi Sharma
- Children: Om Prakash Sharma, Mrityunjay Sharma, Shailbala Pandya
- Parents: Pandit Roopkishore Sharma (father); Dankunwari Devi (mother)
- Notable work(s): Siddha Sadhak of Gayatri Mahavidya; Author of more than 3,000 books; Interpreter of entire Vedic scriptures – Vedas, Upanishads, Smritis, etc.; Reviver of Rishi traditions; Pioneer of scientific spirituality; Thought Revolution Movement; Yug Nirman Yojana (Campaign for Era Transformation)
- Honors: Shriram Matta, Light of India (1964), Postage stamp of India (1991)
- Website: awgp.org

Religious life
- Religion: Hinduism
- Founder of: All World Gayatri Pariwar (AWGP), Brahmvarchas Shodh Sansthan

Religious career
- Teacher: Swami Sarveshwarananda

Shriram Sharma (20 September 1911 - 2 June 1990), also known as Acharya, was a renowned yugrishi who devoted his life to elevating human consciousness, culture, and civilization through the synthesis of science and spirituality. He founded the All World Gayatri Pariwar and the Brahmvarchas Shodh Sansthan (1979).

His spiritual journey commenced at the age of fifteen, during which he completed 24 Mahapurushcharans—each involving the rhythmic recitation (japa) of 2.4 million Gayatri mantras. He subsequently played an active role in India's independence movement. Acharya also proposed the 100-point program of Yug Nirman Yojna (Campaign for Era Transformation) for societal upliftment and reformation of the era.

His endeavors encompassed extensive research on the syncretic relationships between science and spirituality, the revival of Rishi traditions, and the revelation of the philosophy and science underlying the Gayatri Mantra and Yajna. He supervised large-scale Gayatri sadhana and Yajna, interpreted entire Vedic scriptures, and authored over 3,000 books on various aspects of human life. His vision is encapsulated in the phrase, "Hum badlenge, Yug badlega. Hum sudhrenge, Yug sudhrega" ("We will change, the era will change. We will improve, the era will improve"), which continues to inspire successive generations.

== Life ==
=== Early childhood ===
Shriram Sharma Acharya, revered as "Gurudev" by his followers, was born in Anwalkheda village in the Agra district of Uttar Pradesh, India, on Ashwin Krishna Trayodashi Vikrami Samvat 1967 (September 20, 1911). He was the son of Pandit Rupkishore Sharma and Dhankunwari Devi. His early concern for the welfare of the underprivileged was evident even in his childhood; for example, as a young boy, he cared for an elderly woman afflicted with leprosy, despite disapproval from his family and society. His spiritual inclination also emerged at an early age. At the age of nine, he was initiated into the Gayatri mantra and underwent the sacred thread ceremony (yajnopavit), performed by Pandit Madan Mohan Malaviya.

=== First audience with Guru ===
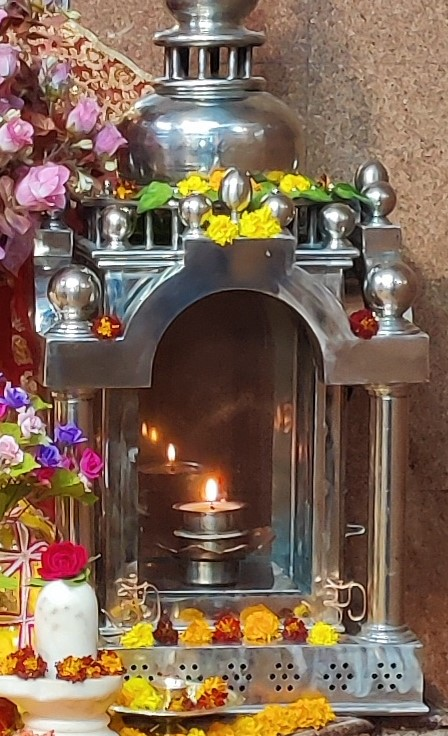
Shriram Sharma Acharya completed 24 Mahapurushcharans in the presence of this Akhand Deep (an uninterrupted ghrit lamp). It is now situated in Shantikunj, Haridwar, and has been lit since 1926.

At the age of fifteen, on January 18, 1926, during the Vasant Panchami festival, Shriram's guru, Swami Sarveshwarananda, is said to have manifested in astral form from the flame of a deepak during his Gayatri upasana. This divine encounter revealed his three previous births—Sant Kabir, Samarth Guru Ramdas and Ramakrishna Paramhansa—as well as the objectives of his present life, thereby initiating his spiritual journey. In accordance with his guru's instructions, he subsequently devoted three decades to intensive spiritual practices, adhering to strict disciplines and performing 24 Mahapurushcharans. His autobiography, “Hamari Vasiyat aur Virasat” (My Life—Its Legacy And Message), reflects his profound surrender to his guru and attributes all his accomplishments to his guru's grace and guidance.

=== Indian Freedom Movement ===
Troubled by the pain of foreign rule, the young Shriram joined the freedom movement in 1923–24 in response to Mahatma Gandhi’s call. In accordance with his Guru’s instructions, he participated in India's struggle for independence to acquire practical lessons in wisdom, honesty, responsibility, and courage. From 1927 to 1937, he actively volunteered as a freedom fighter and was jailed on several occasions for his involvement in the movement. He also composed revolutionary poems and articles, which were published in the newspaper Sainik under the title "Matta Pralap."

During a freedom movement at Jarkhi, near Anwalkheda, British soldiers attempted to seize the tricolor flag while assaulting him. Despite fainting from the attack, he maintained a firm grip on the flag by holding it between his teeth. His profound devotion to his motherland earned him the nickname "Shriram Matta." Post-independence, Shriram withdrew from active political engagement and devoted himself to the nation's liberation on moral, intellectual, and cultural fronts, as guided by his Guru.

=== Himalayan Journeys ===
Shriram Sharma Acharya ascended the Himalayas on four occasions, during which he practiced specific sadhanas and made plans for the future under the guidance of his guru, Swami Sarveshwarananda. His first ascent occurred in 1937, followed by journeys in 1959, 1971, and 1984. These journeys aimed to meet Himalayan sages, seek further guidance, and rejuvenate himself. Notably, the initial journey also served as a test of his endurance, willpower, and perseverance, as set by his guru. He documented these experiences in his writings, recording the purpose of each journey.

“My sadhana was intended to acquire energy for initiating a New-Era of harmony and peace for humanity.”

=== The vision of “Thought Revolution Movement” ===
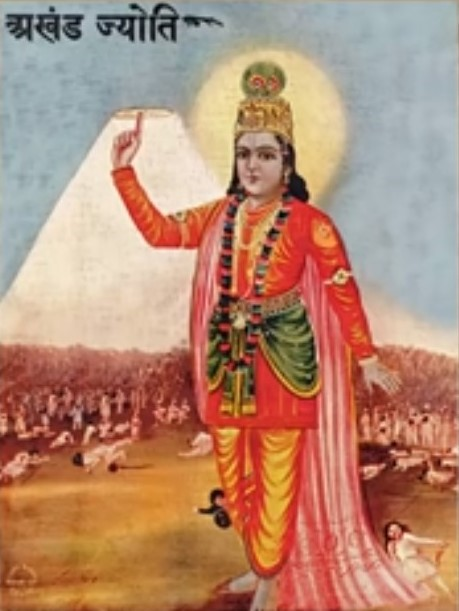
Akhand Jyoti magazine, January 1940

In 1933, Shriram embarked on extensive travels across India, marking a new phase in his life. During these journeys, he visited Shantiniketan to meet Rishivar Rabindranath Tagore, Arunachalam to meet Maharshi Ramana, Pondicherry to meet Sri Aurobindo, and Sabarmati Ashram to meet Mahatma Gandhi. Realizing the potential of inspiring literature and its relevance to contemporary intellectual evolution, he chose writing as the primary means to counteract evil tendencies and blind faith, while awakening the inner wisdom, strength, and spiritual bliss of individuals. Following his first Himalayan journey, he published the inaugural issue of the magazine "Akhand Jyoti" (translated as "An Eternal Flame") in 1938 expound upon the scriptural and scientific dimensions of spiritual philosophy.

(translated from the Hindi text) “...All the qualities of God are filled within humans. However, just as a lion cub living among sheep begins to see himself as a sheep, similarly, the condition of humanity has been ensnared by the influence of Maya (illusion). The mission of the Akhand Jyoti is for every lion to recognize his true nature...”

This marked the beginning of the "Vichar Kranti Abhiyan" (translated as "Thought Revolution Movement"). The initiative was designed to gradually enlighten minds, transform attitudes, and elevate human psychology to a higher spiritual plane. To this end, he proposed four pillars of spirituality: sadhana (spiritual practice), swadhyaya (self-study), saiyama (self-discipline), and seva (service). In addition to the magazine, he advanced the movement through his writings. His first book, titled "Main Kya Hoon?" (translated as "What Am I?"), was intended to guide seekers in exploring the reality of the ‘Self’ through specific disciplines of meditation and contemplation.

“There is only one highway to true happiness and peace in life, and that is ‘Self-Knowledge’.”

In 1943, he married Bhagwati Devi, and together they devoted themselves to the mission of spiritual upliftment for humankind.

=== Yug Nirman Yojana: A Global Movement ===
After completing 24 Mahapurushcharans, Shriram Sharma Acharya established the Gayatri Tapobhumi in Mathura on the occasion of Gayatri Jayanti in 1953. The center, constructed at the site of Maharishi Durvasa's penance, was intended to propagate theism, spiritual philosophy, and the teachings of Gayatri worldwide, thereby assisting individuals in recognizing the dignity of human life and alleviating societal distortions. To purchase the land for the Tapobhumi and finance its construction, Shriram Sharma Acharya sold his property bonds, while his devoted supporter, Bhagwati Devi, sold her jewelry. Initiated with a confluence of sacred water from 2,400 pilgrimage sites, 2,400 crore hand‐written copies of the Gayatri mantra, and an unbroken fire (Akhand Agni) brought from the Himalayas to the Yajna-shala—along with contributions from millions of sadhakas—the Gayatri Tapobhumi evolved into a prominent hub of spiritual practice.

Between 1955 and 1971, Mathura witnessed a series of significant yajnas, including the Mahamrityunjaya yajna, Vishnu yajna, and Narmedha yajna, among others. In 1958, a grand Sahastra (1000) Kundiya Gayatri yajna was organized, an event unprecedented since the time of the Mahabharata. It served as the groundwork for the launch of the “Yug Nirman Yojana” (Movement for the Reconstruction of Era), a mission aimed at reforming individual, familial, and societal values while transforming prevailing ideologies, moral concepts, and social structures for a better future.

Following his second Himalayan journey, Acharya introduced the Yug Nirman Yojana manifesto and Yug Nirman Satsankalpa (Solemn Pledge of Reconstruction of Era) in 1963, declaring, "Hum badlenge, Yug badlega. Hum sudhrenge, Yug sudhrega.”, which translates as: “(If) I will Change Myself, (then) The Era will Change. (If) I will Correct Myself, (then) The World will Correct.” This declaration implies that the power to change the world resides within each individual and starts with our own actions.

Through various initiatives in Mathura, including large-scale yajnas, Acharya assembled a dedicated group of men and women. This collective, united by a shared vision and mission under Pandit Shriram Sharma Acharya, became known as the “Gayatri Pariwar” (formerly “Pragya Pariwar”). Today, the Global Gayatri Pariwar Fraternity (AWGP) comprises approximately 150 million members and 5,000 centers worldwide.

=== Rishi Traditions ===
During his third journey to the Himalayas, Shriram Sharma Acharya received significant guidance regarding the revival of Rishi traditions. He pioneered efforts to restore the teachings and practices of various Vedic-era Rishis. By embracing the knowledge and wisdom of India’s divine cultural heritage—which has historically influenced civilizations worldwide—he re-established the foundational elements of Indian culture and its divine roots in a contemporary scientific context through the activities of the Gayatri Pariwar.

==== Shantikunj ====
In 1972, he established the headquarters for the Yug Nirman Yojana at Gayatri Tirth – Shantikunj in Haridwar, India, with the aim of creating a living model of India’s ancient Rishi Parampara in the modern world. Built on the site of Maharishi Vishwamitra’s penance, Shantikunj functions as a spiritual center for moral and spiritual awakening. There, he initiated the revival of ancient spiritual disciplines that were hallmarks of Indian culture, organizing sessions such as Prana-repatriation, Chandrayan, Kalp and Sanjeevani sadhana, Jeevan-sadhana, Yugshilpi sessions, etc., as well as conducting training programs for women's empowerment.

==== Brahmvarchas Shodh Sansthan ====
On Gayatri Jayanti in 1979, he founded “Brahmvarchas Shodh Sansthan”, a research centre dedicated to scientific spirituality in Haridwar, with the purpose of investigating the integrative propositions of science and spirituality.

(translated from the Hindi text) “Due to the lack of empirical evidence, science has denied the existence of the soul, the supreme soul and the power of karma. If this assertion is accepted, there remains no solid foundation for idealism, morality, or social order, allowing selfishness to prevails as the supreme intelligence. In such a situation, disorder and rampant misconduct will continue to dominate. The rejection of spirituality will lead to chaos in society akin to that caused by ghosts and demons. Therefore, restoring spirituality requires not only faith but also scientific validation.”

==== Dev Sanskriti Vishwavidyalaya ====
He also envisioned an educational institution that would revitalize the education system and nurture selected youth to advance his mission of societal transformation. In the March 1964 issue of Akhand Jyoti, he writes,

“There is a need for an educational institution that can mold its students into noble and enlightened human beings – selfless, warm-hearted, compassionate, and kind.”

In 2002, his followers realized this vision by establishing “Dev Sanskriti Vishwavidyalaya (University)” in Haridwar, India.

=== Sadhana for Era Transformation ===
After returning from his fourth and final Himalayan journey, Shriram Sharma Acharya initiated the practice of Sukshmikaran sadhana (the peak of spiritual efforts) on Rama Navami in 1984 under the guidance of his Guru. This practice was intended to (1) purify the atmosphere, (2) refine the subtle environment, (3) usher in a new era, (4) neutralize the threat of mass destruction, and (5) create and develop divine humans (Dev-manav). The practice was successfully completed on Vasant Panchami in 1986. During Mahakumbh (Kumbh Mela) of 1986, he invoked and consecrated the seven sages—Bhagiratha, Parashurama, Charaka, Valmiki, Yajnavalkya, Vishwamitra and Vasishtha—at Shantikunj. Beginning with Ashvin Navaratri in 1988, he commenced a twelve-year collective Mahasadhana with the goal of achieving:

“The rise of divinity within human beings, and the descent of heaven-like environment on Earth”.

=== Mahaprayana ===
In 1985, Shriram Sharma Acharya entered a state of heightened subtlety and announced his intention to conclude his activities within five years. On Gayatri Jayanti, June 2, 1990, he voluntarily shed his physical body while chanting the Gayatri mantra.

== Works ==
=== Gayatri and Yajna ===
Recognizing the profound problems and crises of the era, Shriram Sharma Acharya focused on eradicating the root causes hidden within the subtle environment (sukshma vatavarana). He attempted immense refinement in every dimension of the gross and sublime environment of life through the spiritual experiments of Gayatri Sadhana and Yajna. He revived the philosophy and science underlying the Gayatri and its mantra, compiling his insights in an encyclopedic book titled “Gayatri Mahavijnan”. Additionally, he reinstated the practice of yajna, along with its philosophical teachings and scientific principles, making them accessible to all.

(translated from the Hindi text) “The essence of Indian culture is rooted in Gayatri, the source of righteous knowledge. Yajna is considered the father of Indian spirituality. Gayatri symbolizes virtuous thoughts, while Yajna represents righteous actions. Together, they promote goodwill and virtuous conduct, serving as pathways to global peace and human welfare, thereby enhancing the prospects for the well-being of all living beings.”

Numerous small and grand yajnas have been organized since the launch of the Yug Nirman Yojana. The “Sahastranshu Brahm Yajna” performed on Gayatri Jayanti in 1953 after the completion of his 24 Mahapurushcharans, marked the first major spiritual experiment that included widespread participation from all sections of society. Starting in 1955, a series of distinct yajnas in the Vedic tradition commenced, including the Mahamratuojaya yajna, Rudra yajna, Visnu yajna, Sata Chandi yajna, Nava-Graha yajna, Ganapati yajna, Saraswati yajna, JyotiÌstoma yajna, AgniÌstoma, the Gyana Yajna of the four Vedas, etc., with increasing participation from Gayatri Sadhakas. The year 1956 was significant for the 108 Kundiya Yajnas and the grand Narmedha Yajna, which mobilized the collective power and enthusiasm of sadhakas dedicated to social reform and the welfare of the masses.

The next major experiment in spiritual refinement, "Brahmastra Anusthana" (1957), involved a year-long Mahapurushcharana consisting of 2.4 million recitations of the Gayatri Mantra and 2.4 million ahutis (offerings) in yajnas, performed collectively by thousands of sadhakas. This effort aimed to protect humanity from adverse events and potential calamities, epidemics, and regional conflicts. In the same year, the first congregation of the All India Gayatri Pariwar was organized to enlighten the members about Gayatri Vidya and to elucidate the true spirit and scientific aspects of Yajna.

In November 1958, the Sahastra (1000) Kundiya Gayatri MahaYagya, conducted to mark the completion of Brahmastra Anusthana, initiated a revival of Rishi traditions. Subsequently, numerous innovative Vedic yajnas have been performed—ranging from daily practices at individual and familial levels to collective yajnas at community, town, and city levels, as well as a series of Grand Deep yajnas, Bajpeya yajnas, and Ashwamedha yajnas. These endeavors continue to expand, and the teachings of yajna philosophy and the scientific process of agni-yajnas have been simplified for adaptation to contemporary circumstances. Consequently, individuals from all walks of life—irrespective of economic status, educational background, caste, creed, or religious affiliation—can adopt and perform these practices.

=== The Authority of Gayatri ===
Shriram Sharma Acharya emphasized karma over caste, challenging the Brahmin caste's exclusive authority over Vedic rituals. He initiated Harijans (formerly untouchables) into the Gayatri Mantra and yajnopavit, training them as priests to conduct rituals. This was a revolutionary step.

==== Rights of Women to the Gayatri Mantra ====
In ancient India, women were allowed to recite Vedic hymns; however, during the medieval period, they were largely considered unfit for such recitations, a view supported by many prominent religious leaders. Acharya reinstated their participation by initiating them into the Gayatri Mantra and conducting their yajnopavit ceremony, enabling them to serve as priests. Despite facing strong opposition from orthodox religious leaders, he successfully formed a group of Brahmin women (Brahmavadini) across the country. This movement contributed to the widespread recitation of the Gayatri Mantra by millions of women today.

In Gayatri Mahavijnan, he cited various scriptures, including the Vedas, Upanishads, Puranas, Brahmanas, and Smritis, to support the inclusion of women in Vedic recitations and rituals, affirming their right to chant the Gayatri Mantra.

=== Revival of Rishi traditions ===
Shriram Sharma Acharya is renowned for restoring the lost legacy of the Rishis at Gayatri Tirth – Shantikunj. The modern adaptations and implementations of these traditions are detailed below:

- Rishi Vishvamitra: Vishvamitra is revered as a devotee and researcher of Gayatri Mantra. Shriram Sharma Acharya centered his penance around Gayatri Mantra, encouraging the same among his followers at Shantikunj and beyond. His extensive work on the philosophy and science of the Gayatri, its mantra, and power of its recitation (japa) are encapsulated in Gayatri Mahavijnan.
- Rishi Bhagiratha: Bhagiratha is known for bringing the sacred Ganges to Earth through intense penance. Shriram Sharma Acharya, through rigorous penance, invoked Ritambhara Prajna—a flow of supreme knowledge and wisdom—to address contemporary crises, instill faith within, and inspire transformation through the Vichar Kranti (Thought Revolution) campaign.
- Brahmarshi Vasishtha: Vasishtha is credited with integrating Dharma into political and economic systems through wise counsel. Shriram Sharma Acharya continued his legacy by implementing the divine plan of era transformation (Yug Nirman Yojana). By making the Dharma framework effective and authentic, a mission was undertaken to unify society under a shared vision and mission for potential realization of ‘global unity’, ‘global language’, ‘global religion’, and ‘global culture’.
- Rishi Yajnavalkya: Yagyavalkya researched yajna and its efficacy in promoting health and environmental balance. Shriram Sharma Acharya revitalized this tradition, making yajnas accessible to all households and initiated a movement to make life Yajna-oriented. He conducted scientific experiments at the Brahmvarchas Shodh Sansthan to study their impact on the environment, human health, and psychology, laying the groundwork for Yajnopachara method (Yajnopathy), a method for physical, mental, and spiritual healing. The same is continuing at the Yagyavalkya Center of Yagya Research at Dev Sanskriti Vishwavidyalaya.
- Rishi Parashurama: Parashurama is known for eradicating misconduct and restoring cosmic order. Following this, Shriram Sharma Acharya initiated the Yug Nirman campaign to spark an intellectual and moral revolution, supported by intense austerity and dedication. His later years saw the growth of creative movements aimed at enriching and flourishing people's lives. Through Sukshmikaran sadhana, the talents of the world were compelled to work for societal welfare.
- Rishi Vyasa: Vyasa compiled Puranas to guide society, while keeping them practical. Sharma Acharya continued this tradition by simplifying Vedic literature, including the four Vedas, 108 Upanishads, six Darshanas, Smritis, Yogavasistha, etc., through accessible commentaries. According to the needs of the era, he authored thousands of books to inspire and provide practical solutions, including Gayatri Mahavijnan and Prajna Purana "Prajnopanishad".
- Rishi Patanjali: Known for his foundational work on the science of yoga, Rishi Patanjali's legacy influenced Shriram Sharma Acharya to promote yoga as a mass movement. He pioneered a novel approach, called "Pragya Yoga", and made yoga practices like hathayoga, asana, and pranayama accessible for health and well-being.
- Rishi Charaka: Charaka's contributions to Ayurveda inspired Acharya's research on lost and neglected vanaushadhis (medicinal plants). At the Brahmvarchas Shodh Sansthan, experiments were conducted to identify and conserve rare medicinal herbs and rare plants. He developed an integrated approach to disease treatment and health promotion, disseminated through the ekaushadhi treatment system, which was offered free of charge.
- Rishi Pippalada: Pippalada conducted experiments on the effect of food on the mind, often testing on himself. Shriram Sharma Acharya adopted a similar approach during his 24 Mahapurashcharans, which he continued for his disciples at Shantikunj. He wrote extensively on promoting holistic health and inner strength through a dietary regimen.
- Rishi Kanada: Kanada is known for researching the scientific aspects of spirituality. Shriram Sharma Acharya continued his legacy by establishing the Brahmvarchas Shodh Sansthan (now part of Dev Sanskriti Vishwavidyalaya) to integrate science and spirituality and explore and unfold the greatness within humanity.
- Rishi Valmiki: Valmiki, revered as Adi Kavi, is known for his poetry that awakens empathy within humans. Shriram Sharma Acharya continued this tradition through the creation and positive utilization of Sanskarshalas and inspirational poetry.
- Rishi Suta-Shaunaka: Shriram Sharma Acharya upheld the tradition of inspirational storytelling exemplified by Suta-Shaunaka, organizing storytelling and Prajna events, such as Prajna Purana Katha, to foster continuous inspiration.
- Rishi Narada: Narada effectively imparted righteous guidance through stories, discourses, and music. Shriram Sharma Acharya continued this tradition through his literary works, including Prajna Puranas, Prajna songs, and kirtans, aimed at promoting public welfare and upliftment.
- Rishi Jamadagni: The ancient practice of training students in morality and virtues through penance was exemplified by Jamadagni. Shriram Sharma Acharya perpetuated this practice through sadhanas and training sessions at Gurukul Vidyalaya, Yug Shilpi Vidyalaya, Sanskaras, etc. at Shantikunj Ashram.
- Rishi Bharadvaja: Bharadvaja is celebrated for his wisdom, teachings, and contributions to Indian culture. In this spirit, Shriram Sharma Acharya developed Shantikunj as a pilgrimage of consciousness, transforming individual tendencies and fostering a pure environment.
- Adi Shankaracharya: Adi Shankaracharya is credited with integrating diverse cultures and awakening the masses by establishing religious institutions throughout India. Following this path, Shriram Sharma Acharya established and managed thousands of spiritual energy centers, known as Gayatri Shakti Peeths and Pragya Sansthans, to awaken cultural consciousness.
- Bhagavan Buddha: Buddha is revered for enlightening individuals and dispelling myths. Shriram Sharma Acharya continued this work by addressing misconceptions and superstitions among the masses through the meaningful implementation of Dharma principles. He authored over 3,000 books to provide solutions relevant to the contemporary era.

The spiritual teachings of the saints of the Middle Ages, such as Chaitanya Mahaprabhu, Sant Gyaneshwar, Samarth Guru Ramdas, Prannath Mahaprabhu, Ramakrishna Paramhansa, etc., concerning the spread of righteousness, continue to be followed at Shantikunj.

=== Yug Nirman Yojana (Campaign for Era Transformation) ===
The Yug Nirman Yojana is an initiative aimed at uniting humanity through the awakening of inner divinity. It represents a pinnacle of spiritual aspiration, notable for its broad scope and depth.

Under this initiative, efforts have been focused on enhancing personal, familial, and social dimensions of life. Key activities include raising mass awareness and promoting cultural values through both small and large-scale Gayatri yajnas and implementing collective social transformation projects that encourage voluntary participation. A notable achievement has been the promotion of ideal marriages free from dowry and extravagant celebrations, setting a significant precedent in India. Other accomplishments include elevating the social status of women, providing moral education for children through Bal Sanskar Shalas, opposing oppressive traditions, supporting de-addiction efforts, and fostering integrated, self-reliant village development.

“Self-refinement is the best service to the society.”

=== Scientific spirituality ===
Shriram Sharma Acharya was convinced that modern individuals would only accept the values of ancient spirituality if they were shown to be scientifically valid for the welfare of both individuals and society. To support this goal, he established the Brahmvarchas Shodh Sansthan, which continues its work through the Dev Sanskriti Vishwavidyalaya. The research covers a wide range of topics, including Ayurveda and Yajnopathy, total psychology, the science of mantra and its therapeutic applications, the philosophy and science of yoga, yajna, sadhana, mantra, tantra, and spirituality, Gayatri Mahashakti, the latent potential of the human beings, etc.

=== Writings ===
In this era of intellectual evolution, Pandit Shriram Sharma Acharya chose writing as a key means to combat the prevailing evil tendencies and blind faith in society. He offered practical solutions to numerous contemporary issues. His writings are both simple and profound, resonating with readers across all intellectual and emotional levels. Whether a farmer in the fields or an officer in an office, his words reached everyone, transcending caste, intelligence, and social status. To ensure his literature was accessible to all, he priced his books at publication cost or even lower, and he waived copyrights so anyone could reproduce them.

==== Books ====
He authored over 3,000 books covering a wide array of topics, including religion-spirituality, Gayatri Mahavidhya, scientific spirituality, life management, holistic health, self, family, social development, Indian culture, transformation of the era, women, etc. His complete works are compiled in 108 large volumes called Vaangmaya.

To dispel misconceptions, superstitions, and blind customs propagated by misinterpretations of the Vedas and other scriptures during the medieval period, he translated and compiled the entire body of Vedic literature, including the four Vedas, 108 Upanishads, 6 Darshanas, 20 Smritis, 18 Puranas, Brahmanas, Aranyakas, Yogavasistha, and many other, into lucid Hindi. This initiative aimed to make the complex knowledge of these texts accessible to the masses. Additionally, he authored 18 volumes of "Pragya Puranas", which explained the philosophy of the Upanishads through engaging tales and stories.

His contributions to knowledge and human culture were highly acclaimed by esteemed figures such as Acharya Vinoba Bhave and Dr. S. Radhakrishnan, the second president of Independent India. In recognition of his work, he was honored with the distinguished title of "Vedmurti".

Between 1988 and 1990, he wrote a special set of 20 books, referred to as revolutionary literature or Krantidharmi Sahitya, which he described as the essence of his entire literary output. This series emphasizes the future of the world and conveys the message of a new era of truth in the 21st century.

==== Journals and magazines ====
In 1938, he began publishing his first magazine, Akhand Jyoti, which has been continuously published since 1940 in 10 different languages. The magazine focuses on the practical aspects of spirituality in daily life, aiming to enhance well-being and promote the integration of science with spirituality. Subsequently, he launched several other publications, including Yug Nirman Yojana in 1964 and Pragya Abhiyaan Pakshik, both of which emphasize family issues, social affairs, and women's empowerment.

== Teachings and Philosophy – Manifesto of “Yugnirman Satsankalpa” (Solemn Pledge of Reconstruction of Era) ==
Shriram Sharma Acharya asserted that the guiding principle of the Yug Nirman Yojana is a straightforward progression: it begins with the transformation of the individual, which then leads to the transformation of the family ecosystem, ultimately resulting in the transformation of society as a whole. In this process, true spirituality plays a crucial role, transcending religions and sects while inspiring individuals to take righteous actions that contribute to a sustainable and brighter future. To make this concept accessible to the masses, he introduced the Yugnirman Satsankalp, which serves as the guiding preamble for all members of the Gayatri Pariwar:

1. Firmly believing in the Omnipresence of God and His Unfailing justice, we pledge to abide by the essential disciplines of divine principles (Dharma).

2. Regarding the body as the Temple of God, we will be ever watchful to keep it healthy and full of vitality by adopting the principles of self-restraint, order, and harmony in our daily lives.

3. With a view to keeping our minds free from the inrush of negative thoughts and emotions, we will adopt a regular program of study of ennobling and inspiring literature (swadhyaya) and strive to be in the company of saints/noble people (satsang).

4. We will vigilantly exercise restraint over the misuse of our senses, thoughts, emotions, time and resources (saiyama).

5. We will consider ourselves inseparable parts of the society and will see our good in the good of all.

6. We will abide by the basic moral code, refrain from wrongdoing and will discharge our duties as citizens committed to the well-being of the society.

7. We will earnestly and firmly imbibe in our lives the virtues of Wisdom, Honesty, Responsibility and Courage.

8. We will consistently endeavour to create an environment of kindness, cleanliness, simplicity, and goodwill.

9. We will prefer failure while adhering to basic moral principles as against success obtained through unfair and foul means.

10. We will never evaluate a person's greatness by his worldly success, talents, and riches but by his righteous conduct and thoughts.

11. We will never do unto others what we would not like to be done unto us.

12. Men and women while interacting with each other will have feelings of mutual respect and understanding based on purity of thoughts and emotions.

13. We will regularly and religiously contribute a portion of our time, talents and resources for spreading nobility and righteousness in the world.

14. We will give precedence to wisdom over blind traditions.

15. We will actively involve ourselves in bringing together people of goodwill, in resisting evil and injustice, and in promoting reformation.

16. We will remain committed to the principles of national unity and equality of all human beings. In our conduct, we will not make any discrimination amongst people based on caste, creed, color, religion, region, language, or gender.

17. We firmly believe that each human being is the maker of his/her own destiny. With this conviction, we will uplift and transform ourselves and help others in doing so. We believe the world will then automatically change for the better.

18. We have complete faith in the dictum: 'We will change – the era will change', 'We will improve – the era will improve'.

== Awards and Recognitions ==
- Recognized as “Light of India” in All Religions' Meeting in Ludhiana, India in 1964.
- Member of India's esteemed Sanskrit Parishad in 1976.
- In 1988, the Uttar Pradesh government awarded him the Independence Freedom Fighter Honor Certificate and Tamra Patra, along with pension benefits. He chose to return all these benefits to the administration and donated the pension to the Harijan Fund.
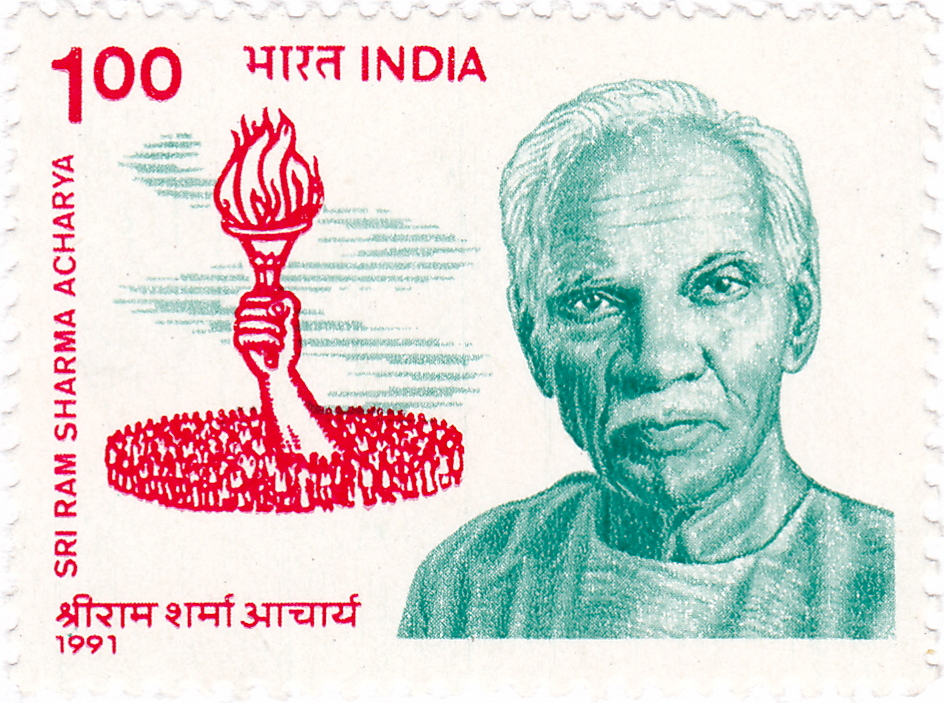
  Shriram Sharma Acharya's post stamp of India
  – On June 27, 1991, the Indian Government and former Vice-president Shankar Dayal Sharma commemorated his legacy by issuing a postal stamp in his memory.
- In 1995, former Prime Minister P. V. Narasimha Rao unveiled a memorial pillar at his birthplace in Awalkheda, Agra.
- As a member of the National Committee for Ayurveda Development in India, he was responsible for training health workers at Shantikunj.
- Shantikunj is recognized by the Government of India as a training center for social education, personality development, and scout guiding.
- A National Waterway Project training center was established at Shantikunj, where he was tasked with conducting programs for land and water conservation across 3600 blocks in 350 districts nationwide.
- Consultant for Natural Disaster Management.
