= Rashid Meer =

Gujarati poet (1950–2021)

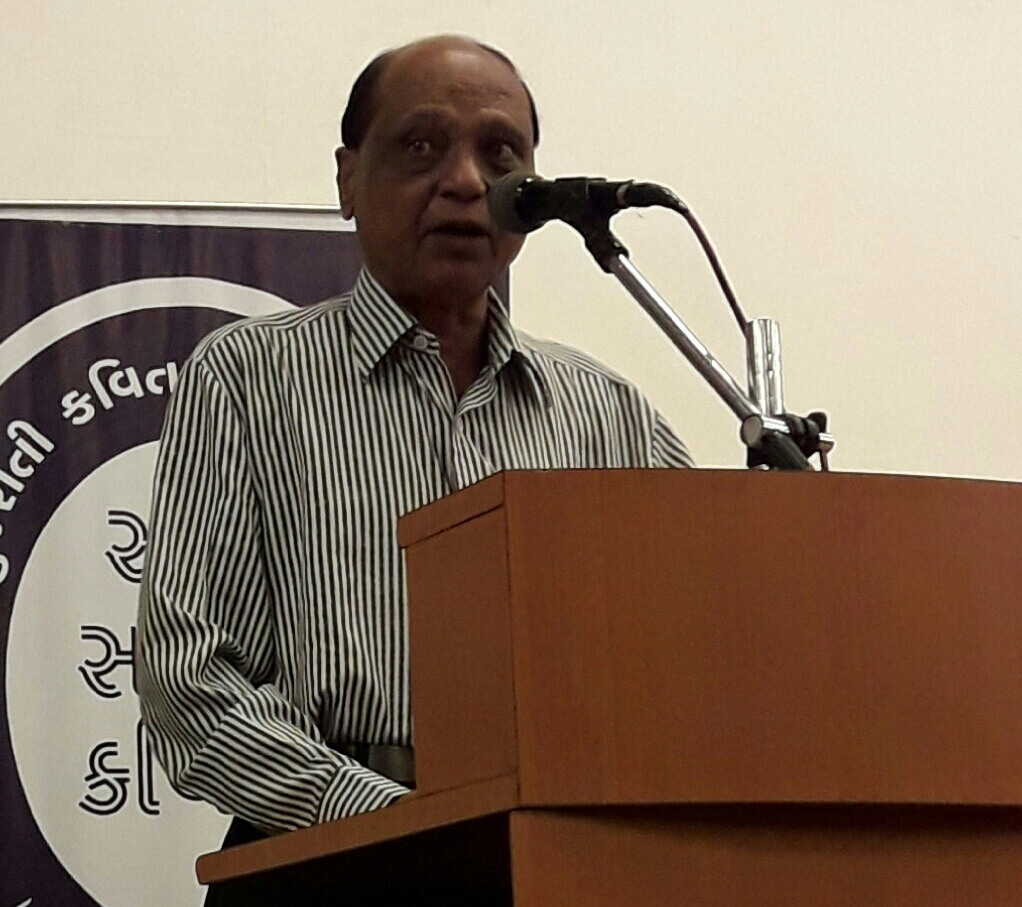
- Meer at Atma Auditorium, Ahmedabad on 6 November 2016
- Born: Rashid Kamaluddin Meer; 1 June 1950; Thasra, Padal, Kheda, Bombay State, India
- Died: 11 May 2021 (aged 70); Vadodara, Gujarat, India
- Education: Master of Arts; Ph.D
- Alma mater: Maharaja Sayajirao University of Baroda
- Occupations: poet, critic, editor, researcher
- Writing career
- Language: Gujarati
- Years active: 1968 - 2021
- Period: postmodern Gujarati literature
- Genre: ghazal
- Subjects: love and spirituality
- Notable work: Gujarati Ghazal Ni Saundarya Mimansha
- Notable awards: Shayda Award (2003)

Academic background
- Thesis: Aesthetics of Gujarati gazal after 1942
- Doctoral advisor: Lovekumar Desai

Rashid Meer (1 June 1950 – 11 May 2021) was a Gujarati ghazal poet, critic, editor, and researcher from India.

He was a founder editor of Dhabak, a Gujarati ghazal poetry journal. He received his Ph.D. His significant works include Saat Suka Pandada (1993), Ghazal Nu Pariprekshya (1995), Thes (1998), and Adhakhula Dhwar (1999). The Indian National Theater, Mumbai, conferred the Shayda Award (2003) on him for his contributions to Gujarati ghazal poetry.

== Biography ==
Meer was born in Thasra, a village in Padal of Kheda district, to Kamaluddin Meer and Halima Meer. He completed his S.S.C. in 1968 from Sharada Mandir High School, Menpura. He completed a Bachelor of Arts degree in 1973 at Arts and Commerce College, Balasinor, and a Master of Arts in 1975 from C. B. Patel Arts College, Nadiad with Gujarati literature as one of his subjects. He completed his B. Ed. in 1980 from the Faculty of Education, Maharaja Sayajirao University of Baroda and obtained his Ph.D. for his dissertation, Gujarati Ghazal Ni Saundarya Mimansa from the same university.

He died of COVID-19 on 11 May 2021 at Vadodara.

== Career ==
Meer started his career as a teacher at M.E.H Girls High School, Vadodara. He started his writing career in 1968 with influences of Ghalib, Faiz, Jigar Moradabadi and Kalidasa. In the same year, his ghazal came out for first time in Gujarati magazine Jay Jay. He served as an administrator of Muslim Educational Society, Vadodara and wrote column Gulchhadi in Gujarat Samachar on every Tuesday. He was a founder editor of Gujarati ghazal poetry journal Dhabak in 1991.

== Works ==
His first ghazal anthology, Thes, was published in 1985, followed by Chitkaar (1987), Saat Suka Pandada (1993), Khali Hathno Vaibhav (1996), Adhakhula Dhwar (1999), Rubaru (2002) and Laapata ni Shodh (2010).

=== Criticism ===
His criticism of ghazal poetry includes;

- Gujarati Ghazalni Saundarya Mimansa (1990; Ph.D. theses)
- Ghazal Nu Paripreksha (1995)
- Aapna Ghazalsarjako (1996)
- Ghazal Vivaksha (2000)
- Ghazal Vilokana (2001)
- Ghazal Lok (2008)
- Jigar Muradabadi (2002)
- Faiz Ahmed Faiz (2005)
- Ghazal Vanchana (2015)

=== Compilation ===
- Ghazal Nu Shil Ane Saundarya (1988)
- Ghazals From Gujarati (English translation of selected Gujarati ghazals; 1996)
- Ghazal Vimarsh (1998)
- Suralay (2001)
- Diwan-e-Patil (Unpublished works of Patil; 2003)
- Gulchhadi Vol. 1 (2010)

== See also ==
- List of Gujarati-language writers
