= Anil Joshi (poet) =

Indian writer (1940–2025)

Anil R. Joshi
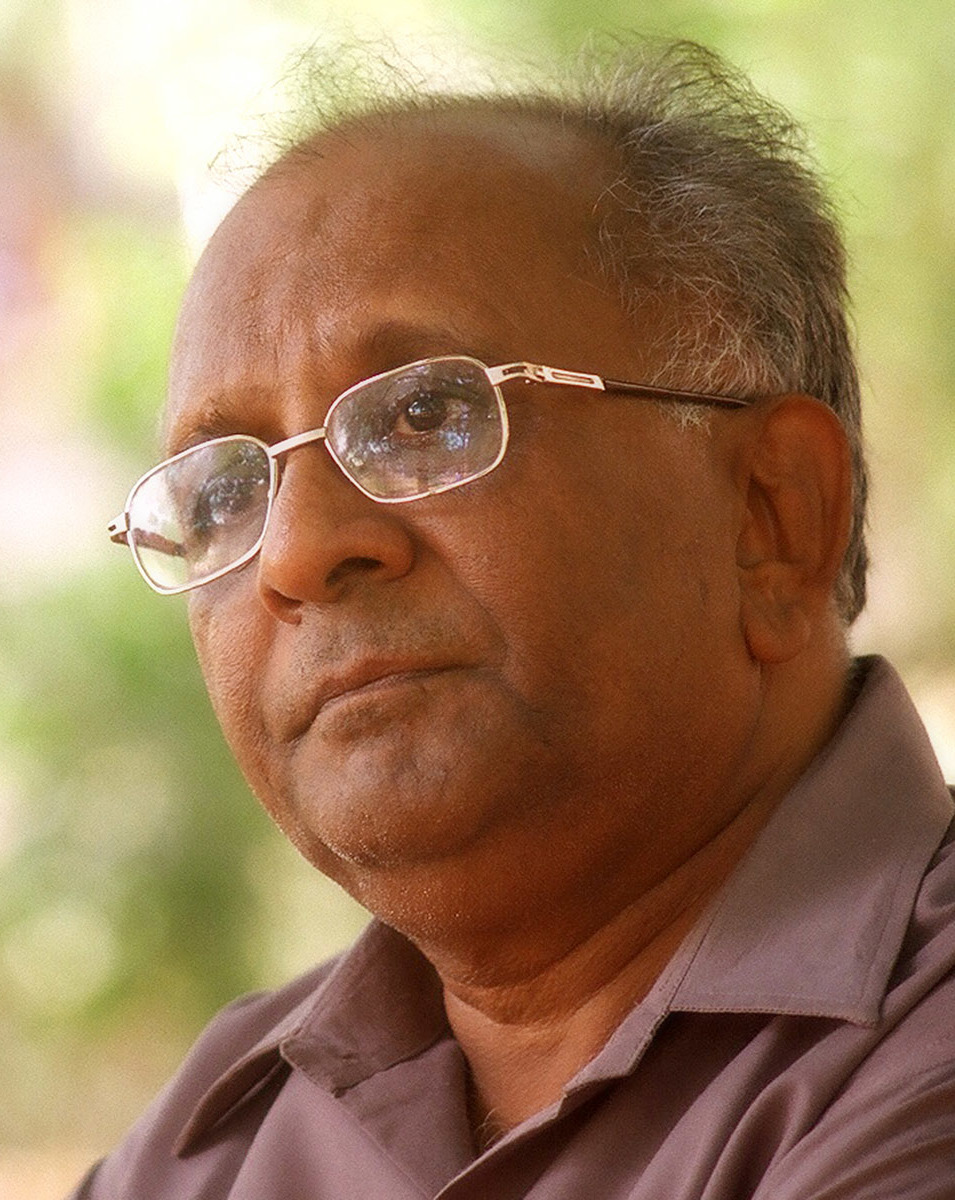
- Joshi in 2005
- Born: Anil Ramanath Joshi; 28 July 1940; Gondal, Gondal State, British India
- Died: 26 February 2025 (aged 84); Mumbai, India
- Education: Master of Arts
- Alma mater: Gujarat University
- Occupations: Poet, essayist
- Spouse: Bharati Joshi (m. 1975)
- Children: Sanket (son); Rachna (daughter)
- Writing career
- Language: Gujarati
- Years active: 1961–2025
- Period: Modern Gujarati literature
- Genres: Geet, Free Verse, Ghazal, Essay
- Notable works: Kadach (1970); Barafna Pankhi (1981); Statue (1988)
- Notable awards: Sahitya Akademi Award (1990)
- Literary movement: Re Math

Signature
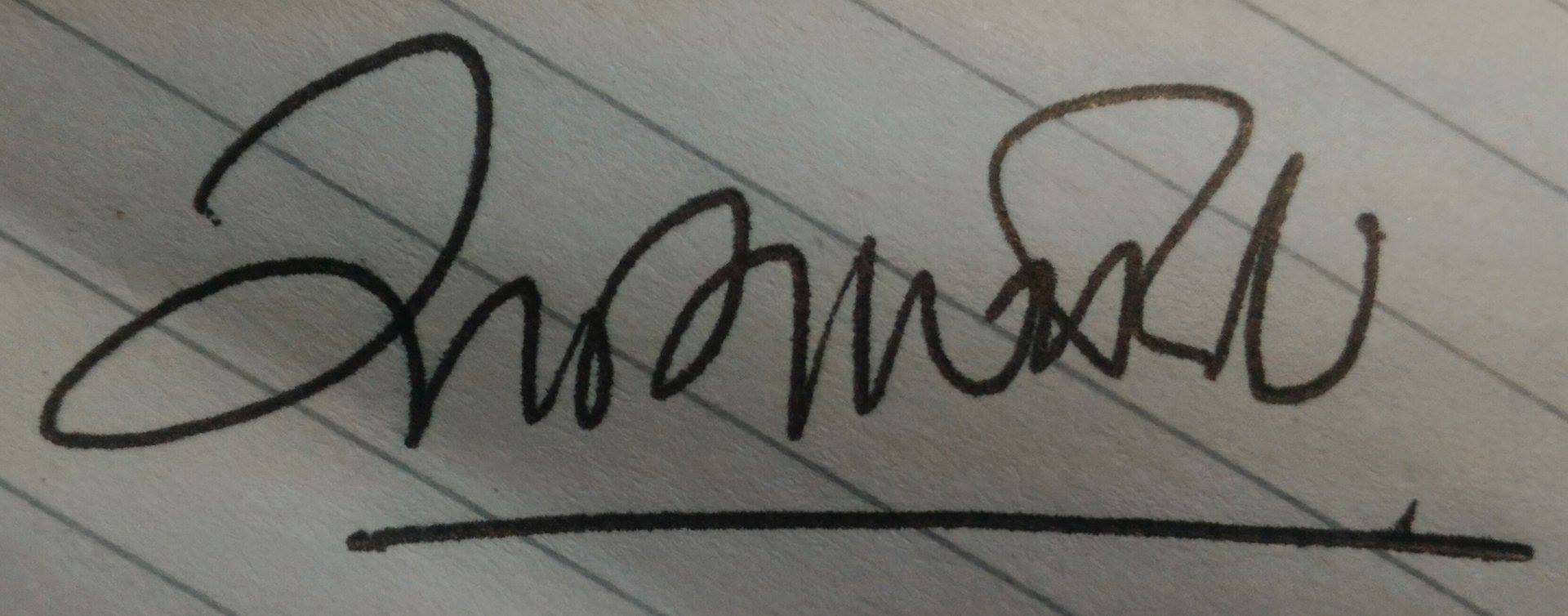

Anil Ramanath Joshi (28 July 1940 – 26 February 2025) was an Indian Gujarati-language poet and essayist from Gujarat. He won the Sahitya Akademi Award for Gujarati in 1990 for his essay collection Statue (1988). His significant works include Kadach (1970; Collection of poems), Barafna Pankhi (1981; Collection of poems) and Pavan Ni Vyaspithe (1988; Collection of Essay).

== Early life ==
H K Arts College in Ahmedabad where Joshi studied

Joshi was born on 28 July 1940 in Gondal to Ramanath and Tarabahen. His father was a high-level officer in the education department. He completed his schooling in Gondal and Morbi. He completed a Bachelor of Arts in 1964 from the U. N. Mehta Arts College, Morbi, and H. K. Arts College, Ahmedabad, in Gujarati and Sanskrit literature. He received his Master of Arts in 1966 from the Arts and Commerce College, Modasa, and the School of Languages located at the Gujarat University, Ahmedabad.

Joshi married Bharatiben on 15 July 1975, and had a son and a daughter, Sanket and Rachna.

== Career ==
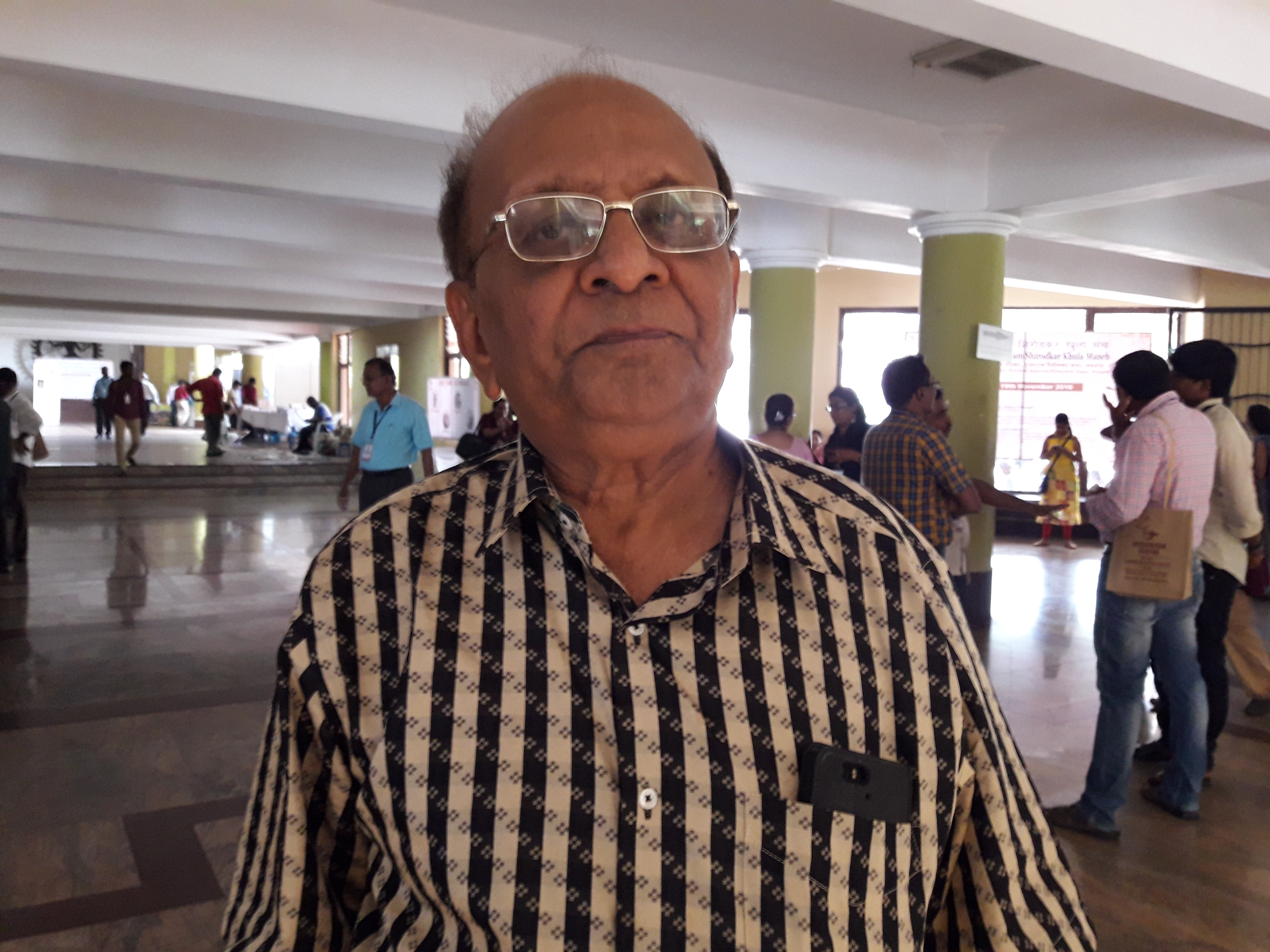
Joshi at Ravindra Bhavan, Margao, Goa on 19 November 2016

Joshi started his career as a teacher of Gujarati at My Own High School, Himatnagar in 1962. He served as a teacher at K. K. Parekh Vidyalay, Amreli from 1968 to 1969. From 1971 to 1976, he served as a personal assistant of Vadilal Dagli, an editor of Commerce. During 1976 to 1977, he worked as a co-editor at Parichay Trust, and in 1977, he joined the Language Development Project of Mumbai Municipal Corporation and served there until his retirement as an Adviser of Gujarati language.

In 1962, his poem "Parigho" ("Circumferences") published for the first time in Kumar, a Gujarati literary magazine. He was associated with "Re Math", a modernist literary movement in Gujarati. When his father was transferred to Amreli, he met Ramesh Parekh. They became very close friends.

He died in Mumbai on 26 February 2025, at the age of 84.

== Works ==
Kadach (May Be), his first anthology of poems, was published in 1970, followed by Ame Barafna Pankhi (1981) and Paniman Ganth Padi Joi (2012). He worked in different genres of poetry such as Geet, free verse and Ghazals. But he is mainly noted in Gujarati literature for his contribution in Geet. Statue (1988) and Pavan Ni Vyaspithe (1988) are his essay collections.

== Recognition ==
Joshi received the Sahitya Akademi Award for Gujarati in 1990 for his essay collection Statue (1988); however he announced in October 2015 that he would return the award over the killing of rationalist M. M. Kalburgi and others.

== See also ==
- List of Gujarati-language writers
