= Shantikunj =

Tourist attraction in India

Shantikunj is a religious tourist attraction in Haridwar and also the headquarters of All World Gaytri Pariwar.

== History ==
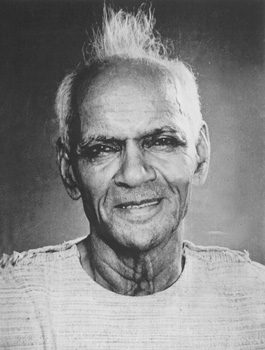
Shriram Sharma founded Shantikunj in 1971.

Shantikunj was established in 1971 by Shriram Sharma and Bhagwati Devi Sharma on a small piece of land. It was expanded over Gayatri Nagar.

Shantikunj and Dev Sanskriti Vishwavidyalaya functions under the Shri Vedmata Gayatri Trust, headed by Mrs. Shailbala Pandya.

== Location ==
Shantikunj is located 6 kilometers from Haridwar's railway station towards Rishikesh/Dehradun on NH58 in India. The nearest airports are Jolly Grant Airport, Dehradun and Indira Gandhi International Airport.
