= Ramesh Parekh =

Indian poet and lyricist (1940–2006)

- Born: 27 November 1940; Amreli, Gujarat, India
- Died: 17 May 2006 (aged 65); Rajkot, Gujarat
- Occupations: Poet, story writer, children's writer
- Spouse: Rasilaben (m. 1972–2006)
- Children: Neha, Niraj
- Relatives: Narmadaben, Mohanlal (parents)
- Writing career
- Language: Gujarati
- Period: Modern Gujarati literature
- Notable work: Vitan Sud Beej (1989)
- Notable awards: Kumar Suvarna Chandrak (1970); Uma-Snehrashmi Prize (1978-79); Ranjitram Suvarna Chandrak (1986); Sahitya Akademi Award (1994)

Signature
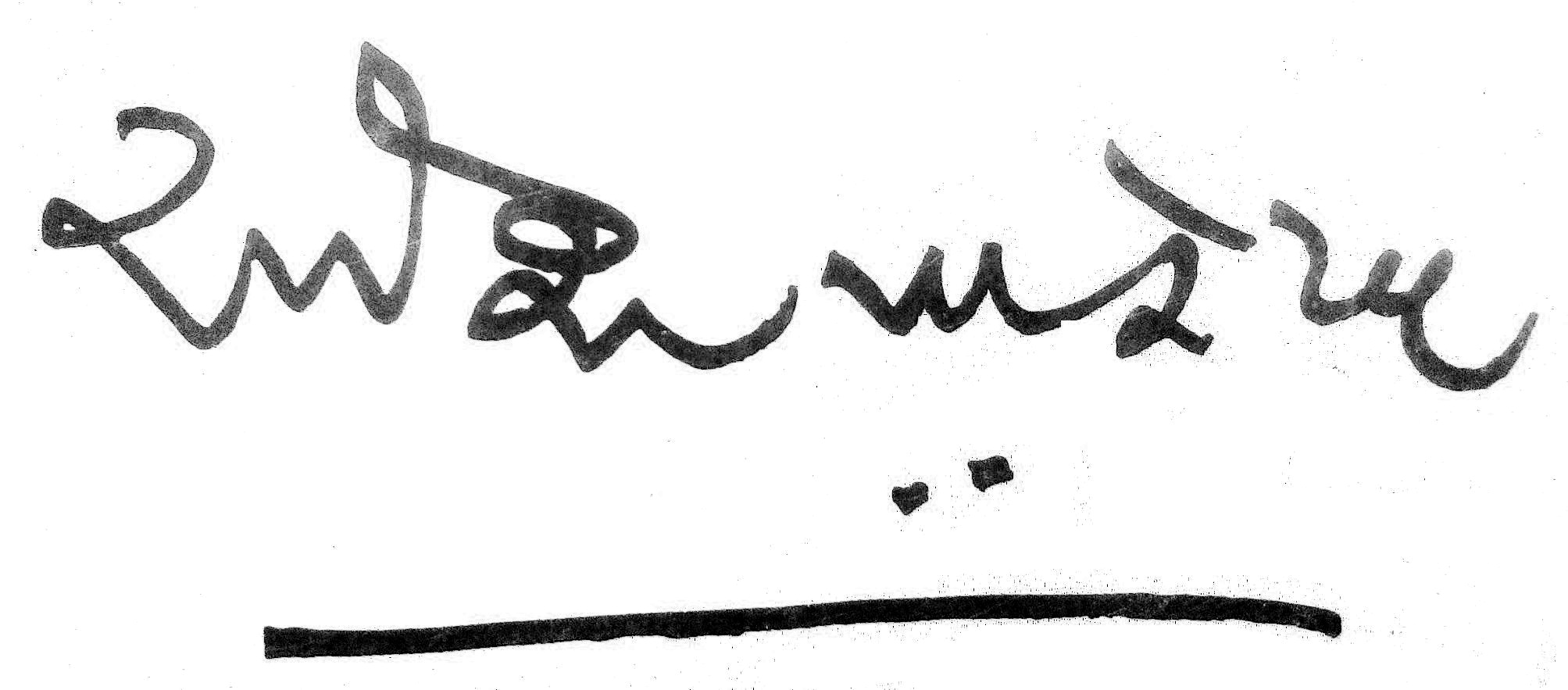

Ramesh Parekh (27 November 1940 – 17 May 2006) was a Gujarati poet and lyricist from Gujarat, India. He was one of the most popular poets of modern Gujarati poetry. Though government servant by profession, he had deep interest in literature and music. He contributed heavily in field of poetry including geet, ghazal and non-lyrical poetry. He also wrote stories and contributed in Gujarati children's literature.

== Life ==
Ramesh Parekh was born on 27 November 1940 at Amreli in Kapol Vanik family of Mohanlal and Narmadaben. He studied at Parekh Mehta Vidyalaya. His first story Pretni Duniya was published in Chandani, a story magazine when he was still in school. He completed his S.S.C. in 1958 with the first class. He received scholarship. He had interest in painting and wanted to join Sir J. J. School of Art but he could not join due to his financial condition. He joined Amreli district office in 1960. He continued his interest in painting and music. He continued writing stories till 1962 and also founded Moral Music Club. He started writing poetry in 1967. He met Anil Joshi in 1968 who encouraged him to write more poetry. His poems started being published in literary magazines. He retired from government service in 1988 and devoted his life to literary career. He moved to Rajkot from Amreli in 1997. He died on 17 May 2006 at Rajkot following a heart attack.

== Works ==
Ramesh Parekh is chiefly known for his songs though he had heavily contributed in non-lyrical poetry and ghazals. His poems and songs addressed to Sonal and Meerabai are the most attractive. His first poetry collection Kya (1970) was well received. Khading (1979), his second collection won several awards. His other collections followed; Tva (1980), Sananan (1981), Khamma Ala Bapune (1985), Meera Same Par (1986) and Vitan Sud Beej (1989). All his poetry was collected and published as Chha Akshar Nu Nam in 1991. It was well received and four editions were sold out in five years. Le, Timira! Surya was published in 1995 followed by Chhatima Barsakh (1998), Chashmana Kach Par (1999) and Swagatparva (2002). Kal Sachave Pagala (2009) was edited and published by his friend Nitin Vadgama posthumously.

His short stories are collected in Stanpurvak (1983). He had also written three-act plays, Sagapan Ek Ukhanu (1992), Surajne Padchhayo Hoy (2002) and humorous play Tarkhat. He published a collection of essays, Honkaro Aapo To Kahu (1994), Chalo Ekbeejane Gameeye (2001), Sarjaknaa Shbadane Salama (2002). He had edited Gira Nadine Teer (1989), a poetry collection and Aa Padakhu Faryo Le! (1989), a ghazal collection.

He had notable contribution in field of Gujarati children's literature. His collections of children's poetry include Hauk (1979), Chi (1980), Dariyo Zullam Zulla Hasie Khullam Khulla (1988, illustrated), Chapati Vagadata Avadi Gai (1997). His collections of children's stories include Hafarak Lafarak (1986), De Talli (1979), Gor Ane Chor (1980), Kuvama Paninu Jhad (1986) and Jantar Mantar Chhu (1990). His children's novels include Jadui Deevo and Ajab Gajabno Khajano.

== Awards ==
He received Kumar Chandrak in 1970, Dhanji Kanji Gandhi Suvarna Chandrak in 1983, Ranjitram Suvarna Chandrak in 1986 and Kala Gaurav Award in 1989. He received Narmad Suvarna Chandrak for 1978 and Uma-Snehrashmi Prize for 1978-79 for his book Khading. He received Gijubhai Badheka Suvarna Chandrak (1988), Shri Arvind Suvarna Chandrak for Meera Same Par state-level Gujarati Sahitya Akademi Award (1979) by Gujarat Sahitya Akademi. He won Sahitya Akademi Award for Gujarati given by Sahitya Akademi for his poetry collection Vitan Sud Beej in 1994. He also received Rajkumar Bhuvalka Award for the same book. He was recognised with Sanskar Award in 1988 for all his works and Kalagaurav Suvarna Chandrak (1989) by Amreli District Office. He was given Narsinh Mehta Award in 2004.

He won the Best Lyricist award of Gujarat State Film Award in 1982-83 for film Nasibni Balihari and in 1993-94 for film Manvini Bhavai.

== Personal life ==
He married Rasilaben in 1972. His daughter Neha was born in 1974 and his son Niraj born in 1975.

== See also ==
- List of Gujarati-language writers
