= Dhabak =

Gujarati magazine

- Editor: Rashid Meer
- Categories: Literature
- Frequency: Quarterly
- Format: Print
- Founder: Rashid Meer
- Founded: 1991
- Country: India
- Based in: Vadodara
- Language: Gujarati

Dhabak (Gujarati: ધબક) is a quarterly Gujarati language ghazal poetry journal published from Gujarat, India which is edited by Rashid Meer. It is dedicated to the growth and publicizing of Gujarati ghazal and its form.

== History ==
Dhabak was founded in 1991 by Rashid Meer after the suggestion of Jayant Pathak, a Gujarati author. Pravin Darji suggested the name of the journal.

== Content ==
Dhabak publishes ghazals, criticism and review of ghazal anthology, biography and interview of ghazal poets. It also publishes important articles on Urdu ghazal poets and their works.

== See also ==
- Gazalvishwa
- Kavilok
