= Indian National Theatre =

- Abbreviation: INT
- Formation: 1944; 82 years ago
- Founded at: Bombay (now Mumbai), British India
- Type: Theatre organisation and troupe
- Purpose: Theatre production, education and research
- Coordinates: 18.9575405°N 72.8078344°E
- Website: www.int-abc.org

The Indian National Theatre (INT) is a theatre organisation and troupe founded in 1943 and based in Mumbai, India. Although performing predominantly Gujarati theatre, the troupe has also produced a number of plays in other Indian languages. In addition to theatre productions, the troupe also carries theatre education, training and research activities.

== History ==
In 1940, on the 50th birthday of Dhansukhlal Mehta, Chandravadan Mehta and his troupe improvised a revue performance named Ranglila. The performance featured elements from Bhattnu Bhopalu (Bhatt's Hypocrisy) by Navalram Pandya, Nawabni Mulakat (Nawab's Visit) by Ramanbhai Neelkanth, Ashok Parsi Hato (Ashok Was Parsi) by Jyotindra Dave and Narmad by Chandravadan Mehta. Such performances, although initially improvised, gradually evolved into organised theatrical activities. In 1944, the Indian National Theatre (INT) was founded in Bombay (now Mumbai), with Damubhai Jhaveri as its first General Secretary. Other members associated with the founding included Mansukh Joshi, Gautam Joshi, Naran Mistry and Chandravadan Bhatt with D. G. Vyas providing guidance.

In 1942, members of socialist youth groups who supported the Quit India Movement sought to use the fledgling theatre scene as a tool for public education, resulting in arrests and imprisonment.

Early performances by the theatre were of ballets or dance-dramas, such as Kalbhairav and Bhukh (Hunger), written by Avinash Vyas and directed by Yogendra Desai. The troupe used two lorries for a stage and to travel around Bombay Province. Apart from Gujarati theatre, the troupe also performed at least one Marathi play. In 1947, Shanti Bardhan directed a dance-drama of Discovery of India, based on the book of the same name by Prime Minister Jawaharlal Nehru, at which he was also present and drew his appreciation, on the occasion of the Asian Relations Conference. Other big productions during this period included Narsaiyo on Narsinh Mehta, Meera on Mirabai and Amrapali.

In 1949, the INT began performing Gujarati plays such as Lagnani Bedi (Fetters of Marriage), a Gujarati adaptation of Acharya Atre's Marathi play of the same name, directed by Chadravadan Bhatt. This play also saw the first pre-sale of tickets. It was followed by a mystery play Snehna Jher (Poison of Love) in which different scenes were simultaneously performed on a partitioned stage. One of the founding members of the INT, Naran Mistry, also directed a number of successful plays. Productions in other Indian languages, such as the Parsi Mota Dilna Mota Bava (Parsi Man with Big Heart) and Shirinbainu Shantiniketan (Shirinbai's Shantiniketan) also began, as well as one-act plays by Firoze Antia, Chalo Jher Pao (Get Me Poison), Bairini Bala (Trouble of Wife). During this time, Firoze Antia, Madhukar Randeria, Anjani Desai, Shankarprasad Desai, Devyani Desai, Vrajlal Parekh, Vanlata Mehta, Nilanjana Mehta and Niharika Divetia became associated with the INT. The INT celebrated the centenary of Gujarati theatre later that year with plays.

Other notable productions included Dekh teri Bambai, Gujarati playsJesal Toral, Moti Verana Chowkma (Pearls Scattered in the Yard), and Santu Rangeeli (Enchanting Santu), and Marathi plays Batatyachi Chal (Potato Chawl) by P. L. Deshpande as well as Kanyadan and Kondu by Vijay Tendulkar. The INT also produced Gujarati children's plays on Chhako Mako and Bakor Patel.

The English productions department of the INT produced W. Somerset Maugham's The Sacred Flame directed by Adi Marzban as well as several other plays.

From 1950 to 1960, the INT organised Rasgarba competitions, which started a tradition of folk performances from Saurashta and Gujarat in Mumbai. The theatre also organised the All India Folk-dance Festival in 1955 and since 1974, has been organising Intercollege Theatre Competitions (later in an association with Gujarat Samachar).

== Contemporary activities ==
The INT produces commercial, art, and folk theatre, does research on folk theatre, and trains actors and directors, and has built facilities in Gujarat and Maharashtra for these activities.

The impresario department of the INT performs plays overseas in collaboration with the Indian Council of Cultural Relations.

The INT performs throughout India in theatres as well as nontraditional venues, and uses no scenery. Productions focus on issues of social justice, and rely on pantomime and dialogue.
