= List of Sahitya Akademi Award winners for Gujarati =

List of winners of a literary honor in India

Sahitya Akademi Award for Gujarati
- Award for contributions to Gujarati literature
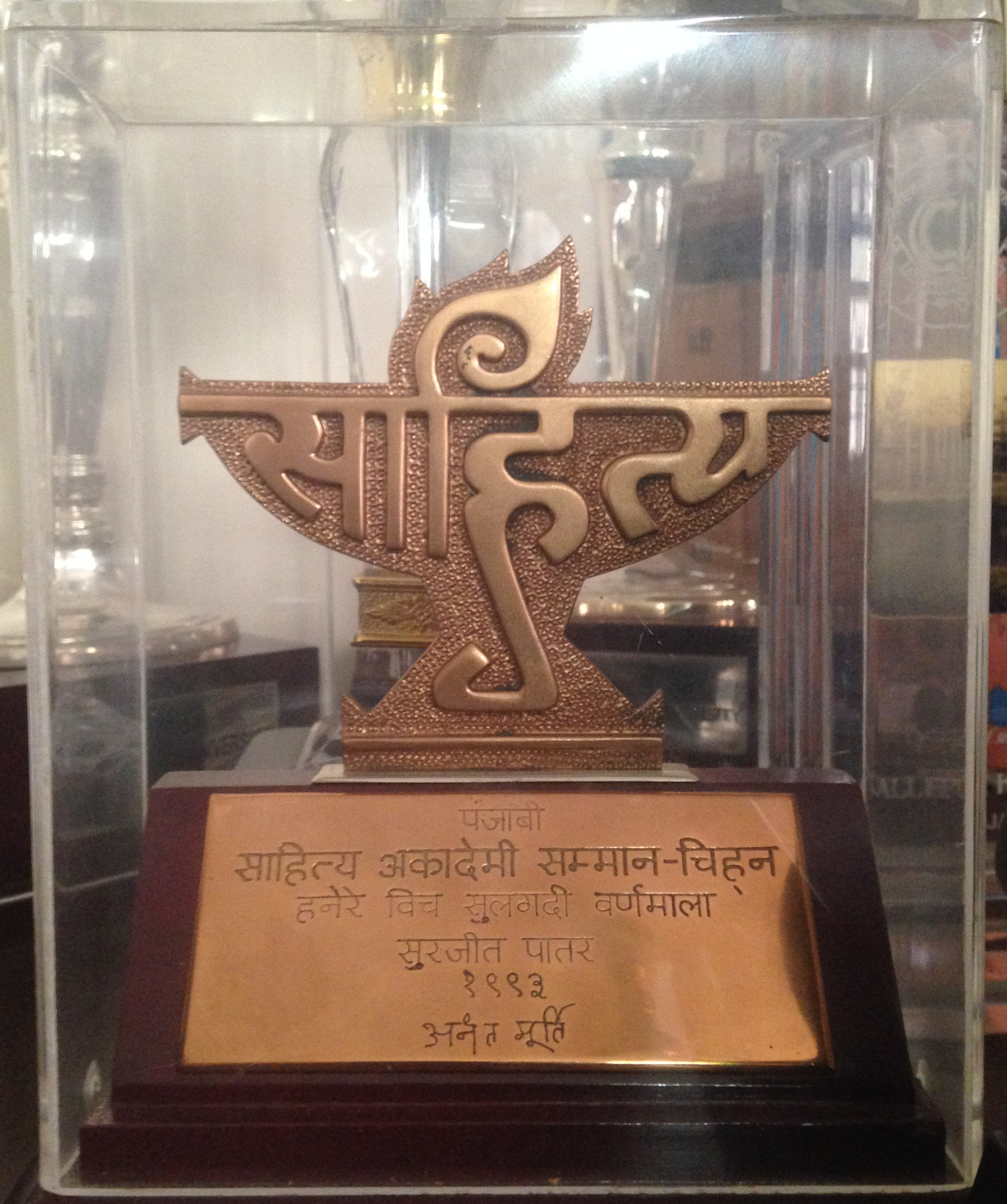
- Awarded for: Literary award in India
- Sponsored by: Sahitya Akademi, Government of India
- Reward: ₹1 lakh (US$1,100)
- First award: 1955
- Final award: 2025

Highlights
- Total awarded: 67
- First winner: Mahadev Desai
- Most Recent winner: Yogesh Vaidya
- Website: Official website

Part of a series on

Sahitya Akademi Awards
Category
Sahitya Akademi Award winners by language
- Assamese
- Bengali
- Bodo
- Dogri
- English
- Gujarati
- Hindi
- Kannada
- Kashmiri
- Konkani
- Maithili
- Malayalam
- Marathi
- Meitei (Manipuri)
- Nepali
- Odia
- Punjabi
- Rajasthani
- Sanskrit
- Santali
- Sindhi
- Tamil
- Telugu
- Urdu
Sahitya Akademi Translation Prizes
- Assamese
- Bengali
- Bodo
- Dogri
- English
- Gujarati
- Hindi
- Kannada
- Kashmiri
- Konkani
- Maithili
- Malayalam
- Marathi
- Meitei (Manipuri)
- Nepali
- Odia
- Punjabi
- Rajasthani
- Sanskrit
- Santali
- Sindhi
- Tamil
- Telugu
- Urdu
Sahitya Akademi Yuva Puraskar
- Assamese
- Bengali
- Bodo
- Dogri
- English
- Gujarati
- Hindi
- Kannada
- Kashmiri
- Konkani
- Maithili
- Malayalam
- Meitei (Manipuri)
- Marathi
- Nepali
- Odia
- Punjabi
- Rajasthani
- Sanskrit
- Santali
- Sindhi
- Tamil
- Telugu
- Urdu
Sahitya Akademi Bal Sahitya Puraskar
- Assamese
- Bengali
- Bodo
- Dogri
- English
- Gujarati
- Hindi
- Kannada
- Kashmiri
- Konkani
- Maithili
- Malayalam
- Meitei (Manipuri)
- Marathi
- Nepali
- Odia
- Punjabi
- Rajasthani
- Sanskrit
- Santali
- Sindhi
- Tamil
- Telugu
- Urdu
Related
- Eighth Schedule to the Constitution of India
- Official Languages Commission
- List of languages by number of native speakers in India

Sahitya Akademi Award is a literary honor awarded to Gujarati Writers by Sahitya Akademi.

No Awards were conferred in 1957, 1959, 1966 and 1972. In 1969, Swami Anand, in 1983, Suresh Joshi, and in 2009 Shirish Panchal refused this award.

== Recipients ==
Year	Image	Author	Work	Type of Work
1955		Mahadev Desai	Mahadev Bhaini Diary	Memoirs
1956		Ramnarayan V. Pathak	Brihat — Pingal	Treatise on prosody
1958		Sukhlal Sanghvi	Darshan ane Chintan	Philosophical essays
1960	—	Rasiklal Parikh	Sharvilak	Play
1961	—	Ramsinhji Rathod	Kutch nu Sanskritdarshan	Cultural survey
1962	—	Vishnuprasad Trivedi	Upayana	Critical writings
1963	—	Rajendra Shah	Shant Kolahal	Poetry
1964	—	Dolarrai R. Mankad	Naivedya	Essays
1965		Kakasaheb Kalelkar	Jeevan-Vyavastha	Essays
1967	—	Prabodh Pandit	Gujarati Bhashanum; Dhwani-Swarup and Dhwani-Parivartan	Linguistic study
1968	—	Tribhuvandas Luhar "Sundaram"	Avalokana	Literary reviews
1969	—	Swami Anand (Not Accepted)	Kulkathao	Pen-portraits
1970	—	Nagindas Parekh	Abhinavano Rasavichar	Literary criticism
1971	—	Chandravadan Mehta	Natya Gathariyan	Travelogue
1973		Umashankar Joshi	Kavini Shraddha	Literary criticism
1974	—	Anantrai Raval	Tartamya	Literary criticism
1975	—	Manubhai Pancholi "Darshak"	Socrates	Novel
1976	—	Natwarlal Pandya 'Ushnas'	Ashwattha	Poetry
1977		Raghuveer Chaudhari	Uparvas Kathatrayi (Trilogy)	Novel
1978		Harindra Dave	Hayati	Poetry
1979	—	Jagdish Joshi	Vamal Na Van	Poetry
1980	—	Jayant Pathak	Anunaya	Poetry
1981	—	Harivallabh Bhayani	Rachna ane Samrachna	Criticism
1982	—	Priyakant Maniar	Lilero Dhal	Poetry
1983		Suresh Joshi (Not Accepted)	Chintayami Manasa	Essays
1984		Ramanlal Joshi	Vivechanni Prakriya	Literary criticism
1985		Kundanika Kapadia	Sat Paglan Aakashman	Novel
1986		Chandrakant Sheth	Dhoolmani Paglio	Reminiscences
1987		Sitanshu Yashaschandra	Jatayu	Poetry
1988		Bhagwatikumar Sharma	Asooryalok	Novel
1989	—	Joseph Macwan	Angaliyat	Novel
1990		Anil R. Joshi	Statue	Essays
1991		Labhshankar Thakar	Tolan Aawaz Ghonghat	Poetry
1992	—	Bholabhai Patel	Devoni Ghati	Travelogue
1993		Narayan Desai	Agnikundaman Ugelun; Gulab	Biography
1994	—	Ramesh Parekh	Vitan Sud Beej	Poetry
1995		Varsha Adalja	Ansar	Novel
1996		Himanshi Shelat	Andhari Galima; Safed Tapakan	Short stories
1997		Ashokpuri Goswami	Kuvo	Novel
1998	—	Jayant Kothari	Vank-dekham Vivechano	Criticism
1999		Niranjan Bhagat	Gujarati Sahiyta; Purvardha Uttarardha	Criticism
2000		Vinesh Antani	Dhundhabhari Khin	Novel
2001		Dhiruben Patel	Agantuk	Novel
2002		Dhruv Prabodhrai Bhatt	Tattvamasi	Novel
2003		Bindu Bhatt	Akhepatar	Novel
2004		Amritlal Vegad	Saundaryani Nadi Narmada	Travelogue
2005		Suresh Dalal	Akhand Zalar Vage	Poetry
2006	—	Ratilal 'Anil'	Aatano Suraj	Essays
2007		Rajendra Shukla	Gazal-Samhita	Poetry
2008		Suman Shah	Fatfatiyun	Short stories
2009		Shirish Panchal (refused)	Vaat aapanaa vivechan-ni	Criticism
2010		Dhirendra Mehta	Chhavni	Novel
2011		Mohan Parmar	Anchalo	Short Stories
2012		Chandrakant Topiwala	Sakshibhasya	Criticism
2013		Chinu Modi	Khara Zaran	Poetry
2014	—	Ashvin Mehta	Chhabi Bhitarani	Essays
2015	—	Rasik Shah	Ante Aarambh (Part-I & II)	Essays
2016		Kamal Vora	Anekanek	Poetry
2017		Urmi Desai	Gujarati Vyakaranna Baso Varsh	Criticism
2018		Sharifa Vijaliwala	Vibhajan Ni Vyatha	Essays
2019		Ratilal Borisagar	Mojma Revu Re	Essays
2020		Harish Meenashru	Banaras Diary	Poetry
2021	—	Yagnesh Dave	Gandhmanjusha	Poetry
2022		Gulam Mohammed Sheikh	Gher Jatan	Autobiographical Essays
2023		Vinod Joshi	Sairandhri	Poetry
2024	—	Dileep Jhaveri	Bhagwan-ni Vato	Poetry
2025	—	Yogesh Vaidya	Bhattkhadaki	Poetry
