= Ratilal 'Anil' =

Indian Gujarati-language writer and journalist (1919–2013)

- Born: 19 February 1919; Surat, British India
- Died: 29 August 2013 (aged 94); Surat, Gujarat, India
- Occupations: Writer, editor and journalist
- Writing career
- Language: Gujarati
- Notable work: Aatano Suraj (2002)
- Notable awards: Sahitya Akademi Award (2006); Vali Gujarati Gazal Award (2006); Narmad Suvarna Chandrak; Kalapi Award (2008)

Ratilal 'Anil' (19 February 1919 — 29 August 2013) was a Gujarati ghazal writer and journalist from Gujarat, India. His other pen names were 'Sandipani', 'Tachak' and 'Kalki'. He received the Sahitya Akademi Award in 2006 for his collection of essays 'Atano Suraj' as well as the Vali Gujarati Gazal Award for his contribution to the field of Ghazals.

== Life ==
Ratilal 'Anil' originally Ratilal Moolchanddas Rupawala was born on 22 February or 19 February in Surat. Embroidery was his family business. His father died when he was two years old. His mother, in charge of the family got them involved in the household business after primary education up to Class 2. He studied literature by reading the novels of the Gujarati press found in the house.

In 1942, he joined the freedom movement and served a six-month jail term in Sabarmati Jail. In jail, he was introduced to like-minded freedom activist colleagues, thus advancing his literary career. During this time, he started writing ghazals and participating in mushairas. He became minister and later president of the 'Mahagujarat Ghazal Mandal'.

Gandhi's nephew Narandas Gandhi associated Ratilal with the 'Rupayatan' organization located in Girnar, Junagadh, Gujarat. While staying there, he edited 'Pyara Bapu', a monthly magazine of Gandhian thought, and studied Tagore's literature along with Gandhian literature. After coming to Surat, he edited a monthly called 'Pragya'. At the same time became an assistant in the publishing activity of the Harihar library, and in the meantime also started writing column in 'Gujarat Mitra'. He became an associate of Neeru Desai in 'Shrirang', the magazine of 'Gujarat Samachar'. He then joined 'Lokvani' and then in the editorial board of 'Gujarat Mitra'. After retirement, Ratilal started a literary magazine called 'Kankavati' and remained its editor.

He died in Surat on August 29, 2013.

== Literary Contributions ==
Ratilal 'Anil's first collection of ghazals, 'Damro ane Tulsi', was published in 1955. The collection 'Mastini Paloma' mainly includes Rubai was Published in 1956. His next collection of ghazals, 'Rasto', was published in 1997. He has also contributed to the field of humor, essay as well as character writing. 'Hasyalahari' (1987) is a book of humour while 'Manharno 'M' and 'Atano Suraj' (2002) are his collections of essays. The characteristic literature he wrote includes 'Ava Hata Bapu' (lit. 'Such was Bapu') (Parts 1, 2, 3) (1857, '58, '59), 'Indira Gandhi' (1972) and the book 'Safarna Saathi' (lit. 'Companion of the Journey') (2001), which gives an introductory-artistic note about Ghazalkars. Published in 1997, 'Chandarana' is a collection of suktis and sutras. Published in 1997, 'Chandarana' is a collection of sayings and aphorisms.

== Honours and awards ==
He received the Sahitya Akademi Award in 2006 for his collection of essays 'Atano Suraj' as well as the Vali Gujarati Gazal Award for his contribution to the field of ghazals. He also received the Narmad Suvarna Chandrak, a literary honour in Gujarat, India, bestowed by the organisation known as Narmad Sahitya Sabha, Surat, in remembrance of renowned Gujarati poet Narmad. In 2008, he received the Kalapi Award, an annual award given to Gujarati ghazal poets, founded by the INT Aditya Birla Centre for Performing Arts and Research. He received the Best Journalist and Columnist Award from the Surat Patrakar Mandal.

== See also ==
- List of Gujarati-language writers

Awards
Preceded by Suresh Dalal	Recipient of the Sahitya Akademi Award winners for Gujarati; 2006	Succeeded by Rajendra Shukla
