= Khalil Dhantejvi =

Indian poet and novelist (1935–2021)

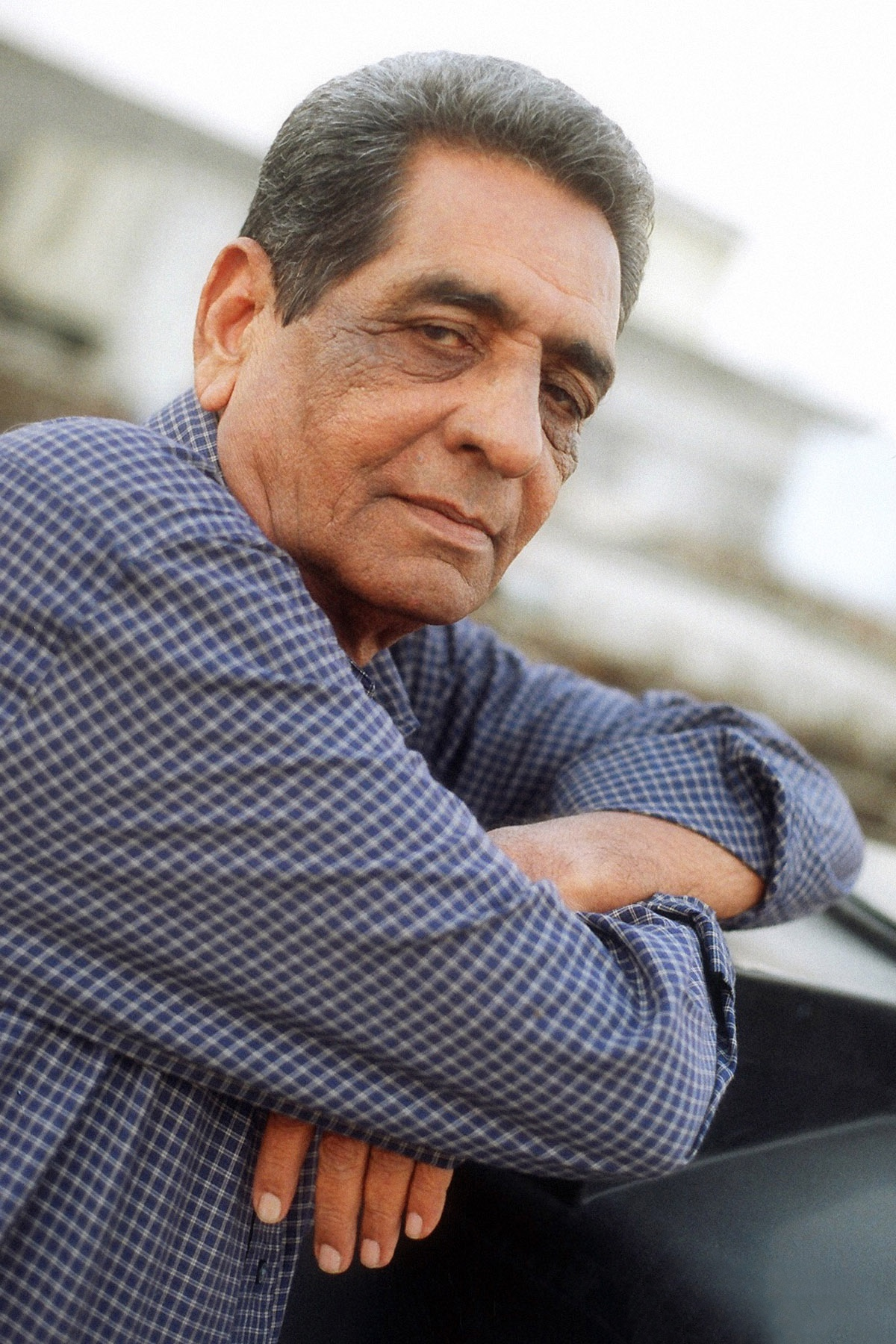
- Born: Khalil Ismail Makrani; 12 December 1938; Dhantej, Vadodara, Gujarat, India
- Died: 4 April 2021 (aged 85); Vadodara, Gujarat, India
- Resting place: Vadodara
- Occupations: Poet, novelist, journalist
- Writing career
- Language: Gujarati, Urdu
- Notable awards: Kalapi Award (2004); Vali Gujarati Gazal Award (2013); Narsinh Mehta Award (2019); Padma Shri Award (posthumous)(2022)

Signature
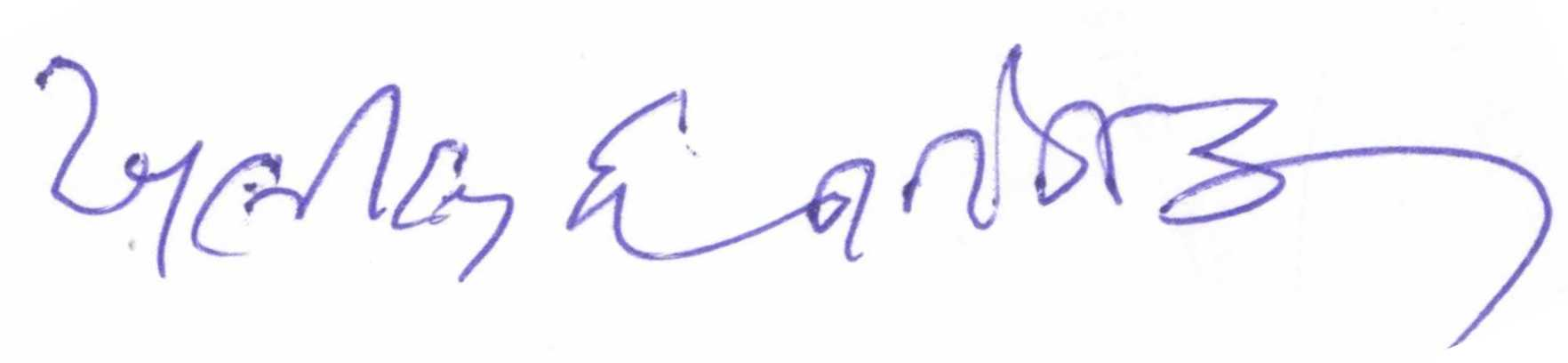

Khalil Ismail Makrani (12 December 1935 – 4 April 2021), popularly known by his pen-name, Khalil Dhantejvi was a poet and novelist from Gujarat, India. He wrote poems in Gujarati and Urdu. He was awarded the Padma Shri in 2022 by the government of India.

== Biography ==
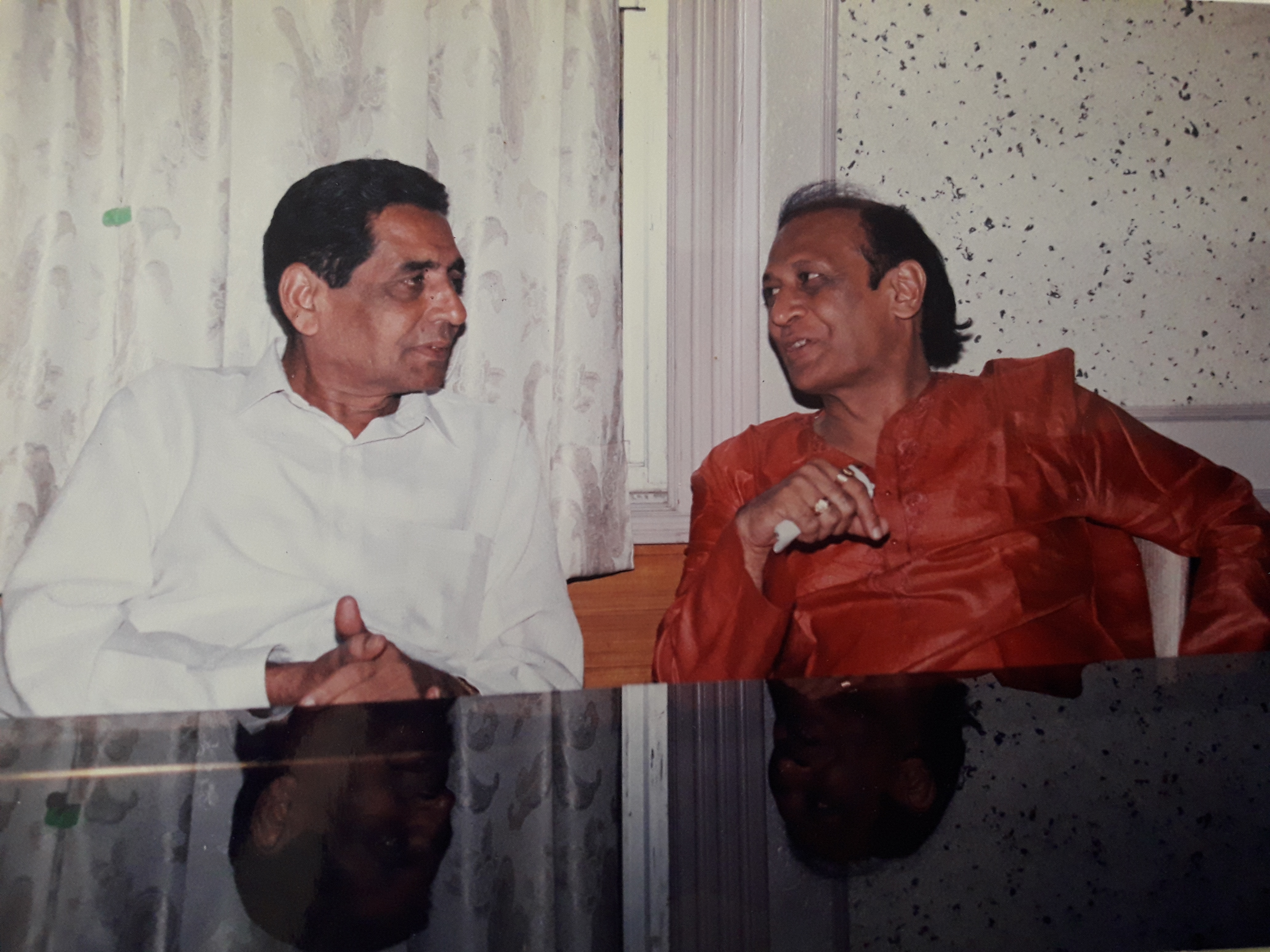
Dhantejvi with Manoj Khanderia

Khalil Dhantejvi was born as Khalil Ismail Makrani on 12 December 1935 at Dhantej, a village in Vadodara. He studied till 4th standard. He adopted his pen name Khalil Dhantejvi after his village Dhantej.

He died on 4 April 2021 at Vadodara.

== Works ==
His published books are:

=== Poetry collection ===
- Sadgi
- Saransh (2008)
- Sarovar (2018)
- Sogat
- Sooryamukhi
- Sayba
- Sanvariyo
- Sagpan
- Sopan
- Sarangi

=== Novels ===
- Dr. Rekha (1974)
- Tarasya Ekant (1980)
- Min Ni Angalie Sooraj Ugyo (1984)
- Lila Pandade Pankhar (1986)
- Sannata Ni Chis (1987)
- Saav Adhura Lok (1991)
- Lilochham Tadko (1994)
- Sunvalo Dankh
- Kori Kori Bhinash
- Mot Malke Mithu Mithu
- Safed Padchhaya
- Nagarvadhu
- Kori Ankhma Bhina Swapna
- Sanj Pade Ne Sunu Lage
- Lohi Bhini Rate
- Mukam Post Zakal

=== Plays ===
- Nagarvadhu
- Saav Adhura Lok
- Parki Toy Padoshan
- Lohi Bhini Raat

== Awards ==
Dhantejvi received the Kalapi Award in 2004 and the Vali Gujarati Gazal Award in 2013. In 2019, he received the Narsinh Mehta Award. He was awarded the Padma Shri posthumously by the Government of India in 2022 for his contribution in field of literature and education.

== See also ==
- List of Gujarati-language writers
