= Manhar Modi =

Gujarati poet (1937–2003)

- મનહર શાંતિલાલ મોદી
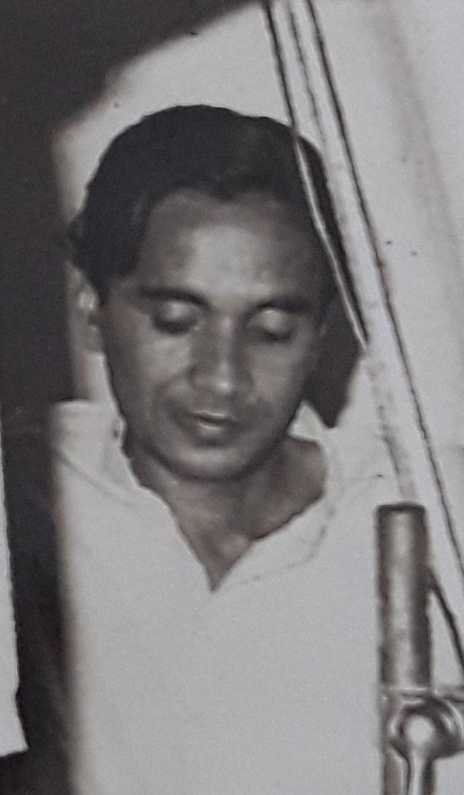
- Born: Manhar Shantilal Modi; 15 April 1937; Ahmedabad, Gujarat
- Died: 23 February 2003 (aged 65)
- Education: Master of Arts
- Alma mater: Gujarat University
- Occupations: poet, editor
- Writing career
- Language: Gujarati
- Period: Modern Gujarati literature
- Genres: ghazal, free verse
- Notable works: Om Tat Sat (1967); 11 Dariya (1986)
- Notable awards: Kalapi Award (2002); Dhanji Kanji Gandhi Suvarna Chandrak (1998)
- Literary movement: Re Math

Manhar Modi (15 April 1937 – 23 February 2003) was a Gujarati poet from Gujarat, India. Born and educated in Ahmedabad, he taught Gujarati at various colleges and edited several magazines. He was experimental in his poetry.

== Life ==
Modi was born on 15 April 1937 in Ahmedabad. He completed his school education in Ahmedabad. He completed BA in Economics and Arithmetic in 1962. He also completed BA in Gujarati and Sanskrit in 1964 and MA in the same subjects in 1966 from Gujarat University.

He had joined various professions during his student life. He worked as a textile design salesman from 1956 to 1958. He also served as a senior clerk in Western Railway from 1958 to 1966. He briefly served as a professor of Gujarati in Bhavan's College, Dakor in 1966. He later joined Bhakta Vallabh Dhola Arts and Commerce College, Ahmedabad as a professor of Gujarati and served till retirement. He served as an Editor-in-charge of Nirikshak magazine for eight years. He also served as the editor of Udgar, a magazine owned by R. R. Sheth Co. He later founded publication house, Rannade Prakashan and started a family magazine, Olakh and served as its editor for sixteen years. He headed Gujarati Adhyapak Sangh for some years and edited its yearly, Adheet. He briefly edited Parab, a monthly of Gujarati Sahitya Parishad. He was the president of Asait Sahitya Sabha and the vice-president of Gujarati Sahitya Parishad.

He died on 23 February 2003.

== Works ==
He was associated with Re Math, a modernist literary movement of Gujarati literature from his early days. He was experimental in his poetry.

Akruti (1963) is his first collection of poems followed by Om Tat Sat (1967) which has experimental poetry in which he takes poetry to extreme of meaninglessness. 11 Dariya (1986) is his collection of ghazals. Manhar ane Modi is his second ghazal collection. His other poetry collections are Hasumati ane Bija (1987), Ek Vadhrani Kshan (1993), Shrimukh Tadako ane Manhariyat.

He edited Gazal Usine Chhedi (1974) with other Re Math poets. He co-edited poetry with Adil Mansuri and Chinu Modi in Gami Te Gazal (1976). He also co-edited Suresh Joshi: Mulyankan, Gadyanu Kalaswarup, Adhit (2010-11-12), Vivechanna Abhigamao and Gujaratina Adhyapakono Mahiti Kosh (1988).

== Awards ==
He was awarded prizes by Gujarati Sahitya Parishad and Gujarati Sahitya Akademi for 11 Dariya. He also received prize of Gujarati Sahitya Akademi and Kalapi Award for Ek Vadharani Kshan in 2002. He was awarded Dhanji Kanji Gandhi Suvarna Chandrak in 1998.
