= Harish Meenashru =

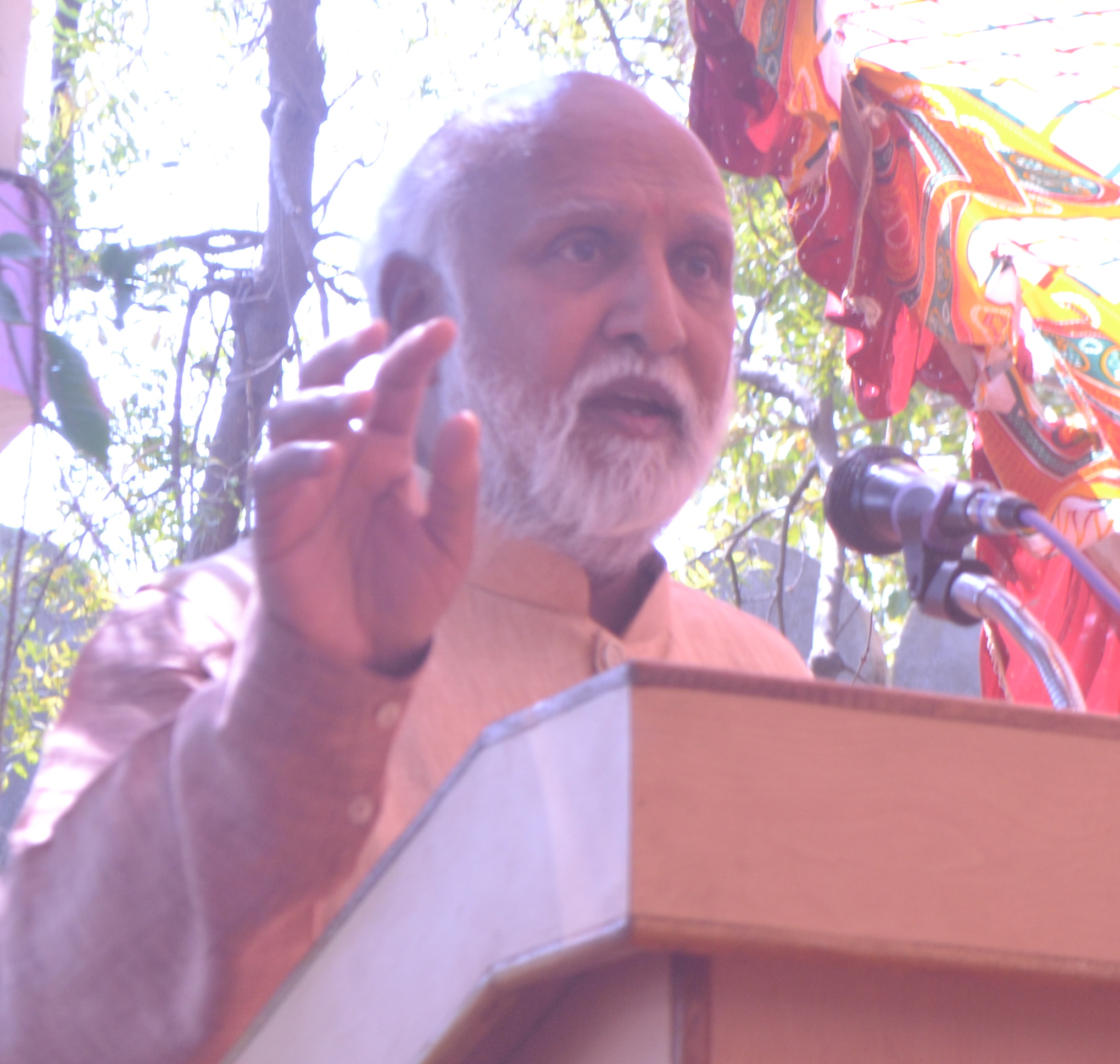
- at Dakor, February 2017
- Born: Dave Harish Krishnaram; 3 January 1953 (age 73); Anand, Gujarat, India
- Education: Master of Science
- Alma mater: Sardar Patel University
- Occupations: Poet, translator, bank manager
- Spouse: Geeta
- Children: Tirath, Amita, Saakhi, Ananya
- Writing career
- Pen name: Harish Meenashru
- Language: Gujarati
- Period: Modern Gujarati literature
- Genres: Ghazal, geet, free verse
- Notable works: Dhribaangsundar Eni Pere Dolya (1988); Suno Bhai Sadho (1999); Tandul (1999); Banaras Diary (2016)
- Notable awards: Takhtasinh Parmar Prize (1988–89); Kalapi Award (2010); Vali Gujarati Gazal Award (2012); Narsinh Mehta Award (2014); Sahitya Akademi Award (2020)

Harish Krishnaram Dave, better known by his pen name Harish Meenashru, is a Gujarati language poet and translator from Gujarat, India. He is best known as a postmodern poet in Gujarati literature. Some of his significant works include Dhribaangsundar Eni Pere Dolya (1988), Suno Bhai Sadho (1999), Tandul (1999), Parjanyasukta (1999), and Banaras Diary (2016). His poems have been translated in Hindi, Marathi, Malayalam, Kannada, German, and English. He received a Kalapi Award (2010), Vali Gujarati Gazal Award (2012), and Narsinh Mehta Award (2014). He received the 2020 Sahitya Akademi Award for his poetry collection Banaras Diary (2016).

== Life ==
Meenashru was born on 3 January 1953 in Anand, Gujarat, India. He studied at Dadabhai Navroji (DN) High School, Anand, from 1962 to 1969. He earned a B.Sc. in Chemistry from V. P. Science College, Vallabh Vidhyanagar (1969-1970), and an M.B. at Patel Science College, Anand (1970-1973). He received an M.Sc. from the Department of Chemistry of the Sardar Patel University in 1975.

Meenashru started his career with the Bank of Baroda in March 1977. He managed several branches and retired voluntarily in March 2001 as a senior manager of the Amul Dairy Road branch, Anand.

He married Geeta Dave on 30 May 1977. Their son, Tirath, was born in 1979. He lives in Bakrol village, Anand.

== Works ==
Meenashru wrote his first poem in fifth standard. In 1974, his poem, Chadiyanu Dukaalgeet, was first published in Nootan Shikshan, a magazine edited by Gunvant Shah.

Dhribaangsundar Eni Pere Dolya, his first anthology of poems, was published in 1988, followed by Tambul (1999), Tandul (1999), Parjanyasukta (1999), Suno Bhai Sadho (1999), Pad Pranjali (2004), Pankhipadarath (2011), Shabadman Jinkun Khas Khabaran Padi, (2011), and Banaras Diary (2016).

Nakhasikh (1977), a compilation of selected modern Gujarati ghazals, and Shesh-Vishesh (1984) are two of his compilations. Some of his poems have been edited and translated into English by Piyush Joshi as A Tree with a Thousand Wings (2008).

He has also translated world poetry. He has translated into Gujarati the poems of eighth-century Chinese poet Wang Wei and Nicaraguan poet Pablo Antonio Cuadra. Some of the translated poems are published as Deshatan (Translations of World Poetry) and Hampinā Khadako (2014; translation of poetry of Kannada poet, Chandrashekhara Kambara).

== Criticism ==
Dileep Jhaveri praised him in Muse India (Issue 68: Jul–Aug 2016):

Harish Minashru is an important name because of his constant preoccupation in exploring several possibilities of language by way of musicality, associations and multiple combinations of words or their fragments uniting into surprisingly new words. This creates new challenges for the meanings and poetic intentions. His basic support is minute observations of objects and phenomena along with mastery over Sanskrit, medieval and modern verse forms. He does not hesitate to take risk of anarchy while ascertaining individuality. This is the fundamental function of poetry.

== Awards and recognitions ==
Year	Award	Conferred by
2020	Sahitya Akademi Award	Sahitya Akademi
2017	Sahitya Akademi Translation Prize	Sahitya Akademi
2014	Narsinh Mehta Award	
2012	Vali Gujarati Gazal Award	Gujarat Sahitya Akademi
2010	Kalapi Award	Indian National Theatre
1988–89	Takhtasinh Parmar Prize	Gujarati Sahitya Parishad

== See also ==
- List of Gujarati-language writers

Awards
Preceded by Ratilal Borisagar	Recipient of the Sahitya Akademi Award winners for Gujarati; 2020	Succeeded by Yagnesh Dave
