= Nayan H. Desai =

Gujarati poet

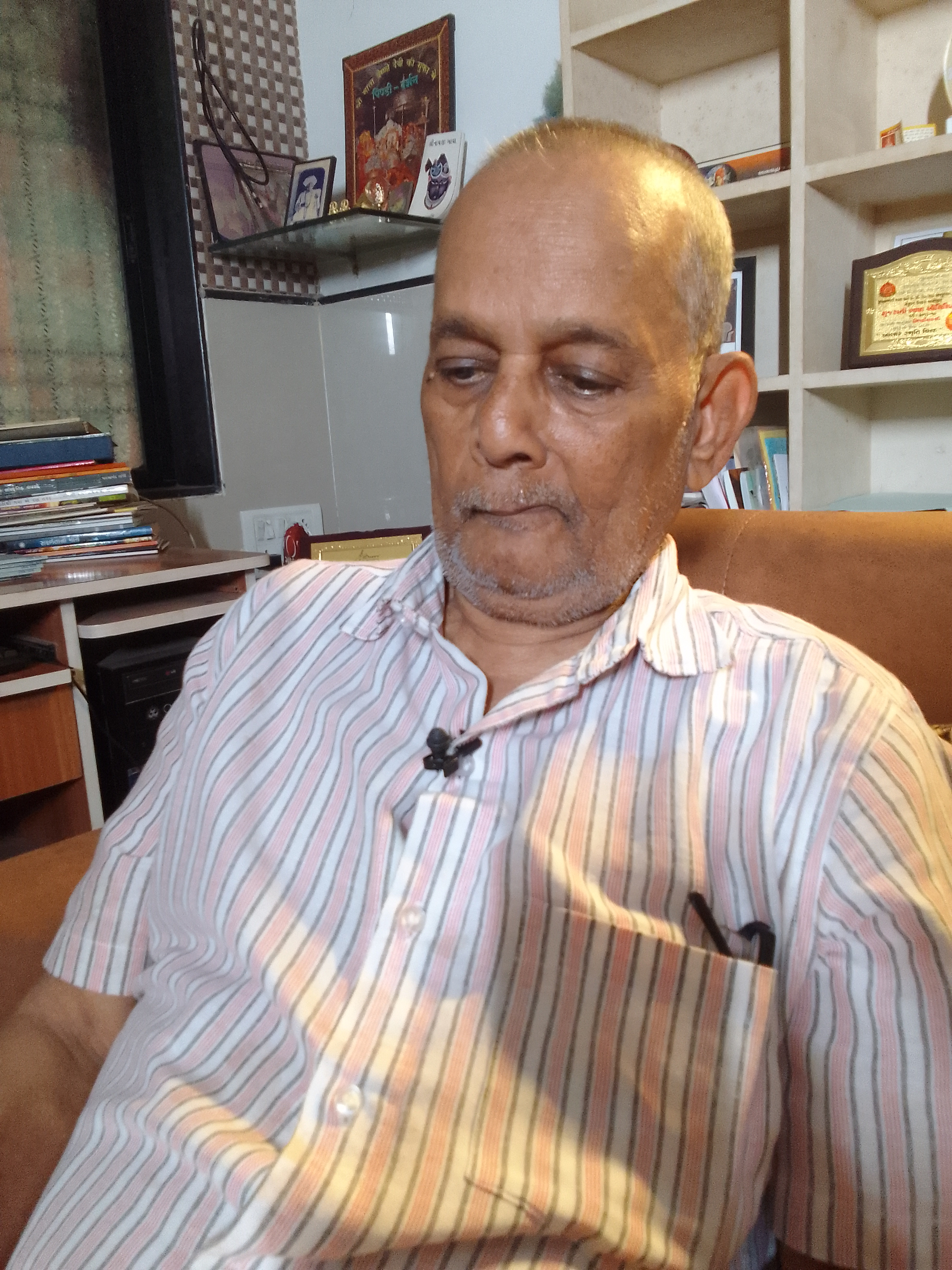
- Desai in Surat; August 2023
- Born: Nayan Harshadray Desai; 22 February 1946; Kathodara, Surat district, Gujarat
- Died: 12 October 2023 (aged 77); Surat, Gujarat, India
- Occupation: Poet
- Spouse: Shashi (m. 1990)
- Writing career
- Language: Gujarati
- Genres: Ghazal, Geet
- Notable works: Manas Urfe Reti Urfe Dariyo (1979); Mukam Post Manas (1983)
- Notable awards: Kalapi Award (2013); Kavishwar Dalpatram Award (2016)

Nayan H. Desai (22 February 1946 – 12 October 2023) was a Gujarati language poet from Gujarat, India. His significant work includes Manas Urfe Reti Urfe Dariyo (1979), Mukam Post Manas (1983), and Dhoop Ka Saya (ghazals in Urdu). He received the Kalapi Award in 2013 and the Kavishwar Dalpatram Award in 2016.

== Biography ==
Desai was born on 22 February 1946 in Kathodara, a town now in the Surat district, to Harshadray and Indumatiben. His family belonged to Valod. After completing his SSC in 1965, he worked in a diamond factory for 14 years. In 1980, he joined Gujarat Mitra, a Gujarati daily, as a sub-editor. He was retired.

He married Shashi in 1990. He died on 12 October 2023 in Surat.

== Works ==
His first poetry collection Manas Urfe Reti Urfe Dariyo (1979) has 58 poems which are mostly ghazals and some are songs. His second collection Mukam Post Manas (1982) has 56 poems. These two collections are experimental and include variety. These poems depict loneliness and separation of modern humans. A person affected and tormented by pain is a central theme of his poetry. He later published Angali Vadhine Mokalu (1984), Anushthan and Samandar Baj Manas. All these collections were collected and published as Nayan na Moti (2005). Dhoop Ka Saya has ghazals in Urdu.

== Recognition ==
His Mukam Post Manas (1982) was awarded by the Gujarati Sahitya Parishad and his Dhoop Ka Saya was awarded by the Urdu Sahitya Akademi. The Indian National Theatre awarded him the Kalapi Award in 2013 for his significant contribution to Gujarati ghazal poetry. He received the Kavishwar Dalpatram Award in 2016 for his contribution to Gujarati poetry.

== See also ==
- List of Gujarati-language writers
