= Rajendra Shukla =

Rajendra Shukla may refer to:

- Rajendra Shukla (poet) (born 1942), Indian Gujarati-language poet
- Rajendra Shukla (politician) (born 1964), Indian politician in Madhya Pradesh
