= Rajesh Vyas Miskin =

Indian Gujarati-language poet (Born: 1955)

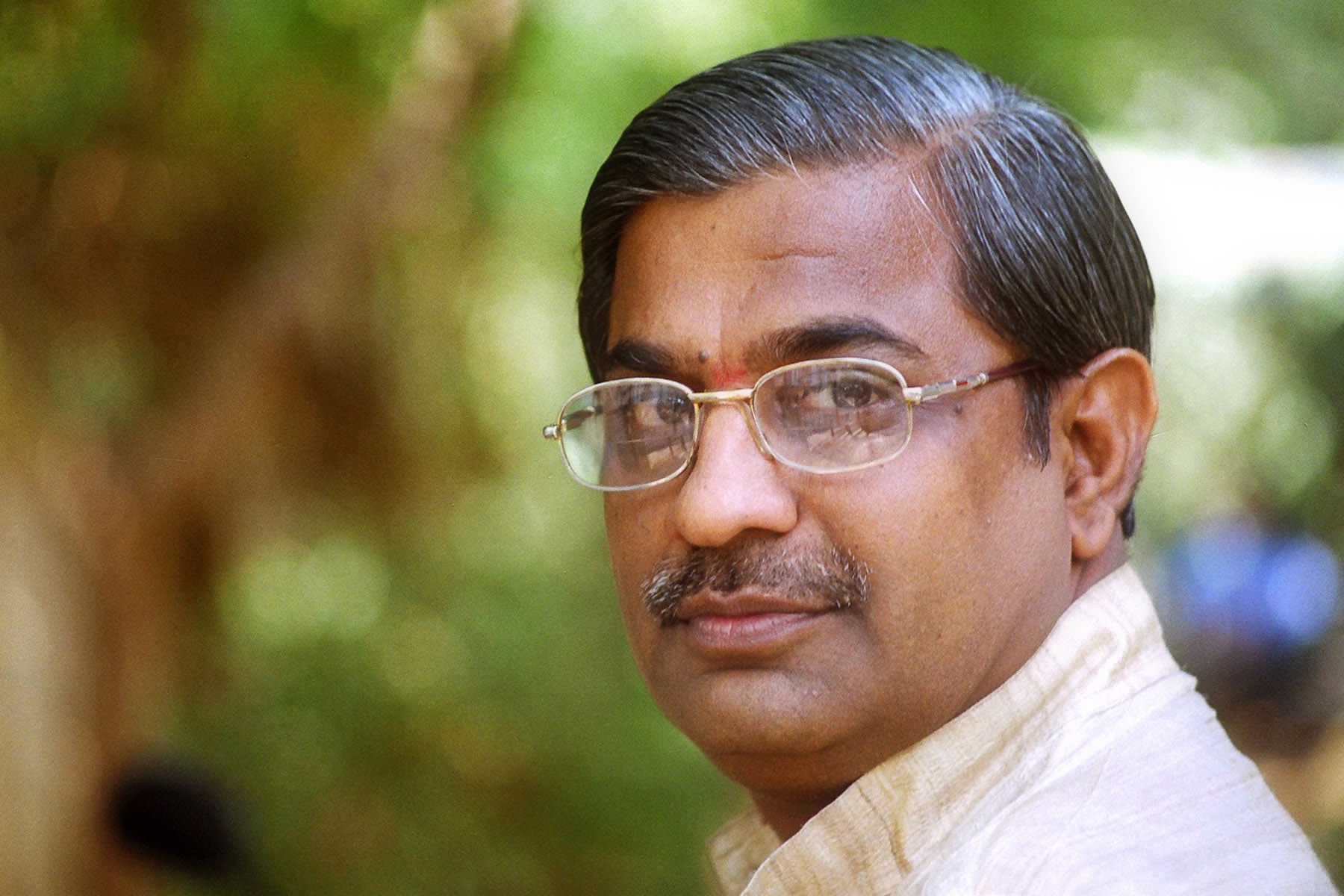
- Miskin at his residence in Ahmedabad, 2007
- Born: Rajesh Jatashankar Vyas; 16 October 1955; Ahmedabad, Gujarat
- Education: Gujarat University; Gujarat Vidyapith
- Occupations: Poet, editor
- Writing career
- Pen name: Miskin
- Language: Gujarati
- Years active: Since 1970
- Notable works: Tutelo Samay (1983); Chhodine Aav Tu (2005); Gazal Vimarsh (2007)
- Notable awards: Harindra Dave memorial award (2005); Kalapi Award (2009); Kumar Suvarna Chandrak (2010); Vali Gujarati Award (2014); Narsinh Mehta Award (2021)

Academic background
- Thesis: Gujarati ghazal and its varied perspectives
- Doctoral advisor: Chandrakant Topiwala

Rajesh Jatashankar Vyas (born 16 October 1955), better known by his pen name Miskin, is an Indian Gujarati-language poet from Gujarat, India. Born and brought up in Ahmedabad, he completed his doctorate in Gujarati literature. He writes ghazal poetry and columns in various publications.

== Early life ==
Rajesh Vyas was born on 16 October 1955 in Ahmedabad, Gujarat, to Jatashankar and Vijayaben. He completed his primary education from Sheth Chimanlal Nagindas Vidyalaya, Ahmedabad. He completed his matriculation from Sharadagram, Mangrol. He completed a B.A. in Psychology in 1978, a B.A. in Gujarati literature in 1981, and an M.A. in Gujarati literature in 1983 from Gujarat University. He completed his M.Phil. in Gujarati literature in 1985 from Gujarat Vidyapith. He completed his PhD in 1989 from Gujarat University, under Chandrakant Topiwala. Gujarati Gazal Tena Vividh Pariprekshya Ma (Gujarati ghazal in its various perspectives) was the subject of his thesis.

== Career ==
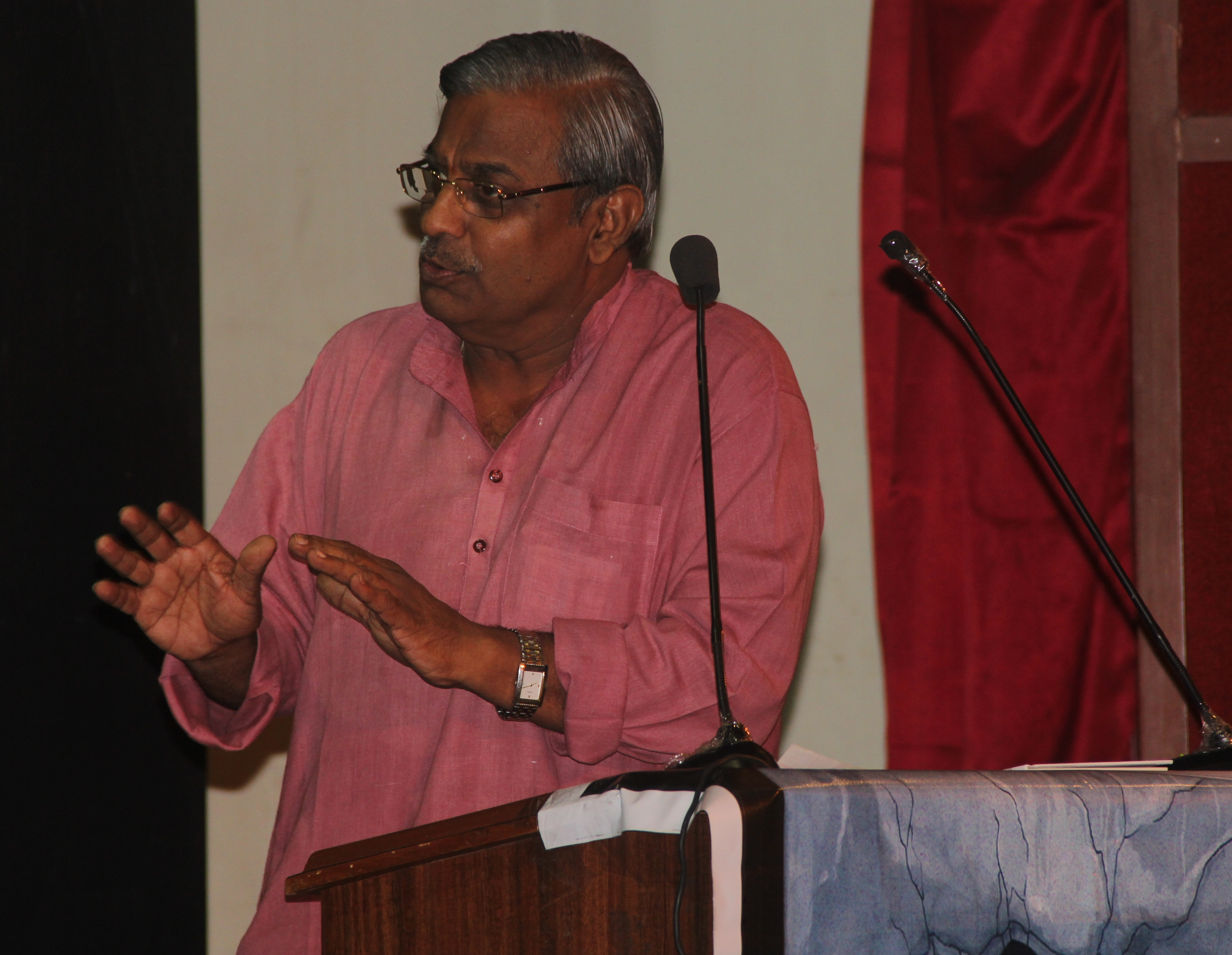
Miskin at Gujarati Sahitya Parishad on 20 August 2016

He started writing in 1960. In 1973, he published his first poem in Kavilok. He later published his poems in numerous magazines including Parab, Kumar, Kavilok, Navneet Samarpan, Kavita, Shabdasrishti and Tadarthya. He writes weekly columns in various publications such as Shabda Soorne Mele in Gujarat Samachar, Anhad Na Ajawala in Jankalyan. He formerly wrote a column for Navneet Samarpan. He was an editor of the Gujarati poetry journal Gazalvishwa.

== Works ==
His pen name "Miskin" means a poor person. He has researched Gujarati ghazals and their science of prosody.

His ghazal anthologies are Tutelo Samay (1983), Chhodine Aav Tu (2005), Koi Taru Nathi (2007), Ae Pan Sachu Aa Pan Sachu (2008), Paheli Najar (2008), Badli Jo Disha (2009), Ae Orado Judo Che (2013), Paniyara Kya Gaya? (2015), Baa No Saadalo (2015). His selected ghazals have been compiled as Best of Miskin by Harsh Brahmbhatt. Gazal Vimarsh (2007) is a collection of research papers on Gujarati ghazal while Gazal Sandarbh (2010) is a collection of critical essays on Gujarati ghazals. His other work of ghazals is Energy (2010). Lalitasahastranaam (2011) is a work on metaphysics. Gazal Praveshika (2012) is about the metres of ghazal and its mechanics.

He edited several compilations of ghazals including Amar Gazalo, selected works of Gujarati ghazal poets; Samagra Mareez (2009), the complete works of Mareez; Mareez Ni Shreshth Gazalo (2010), selected works of Mareez; Ramesh Parekhni Shreshth Gazalo (2011), selected works of Ramesh Parekh; and Arooz Shear (2012), selected works of Shoonya Palanpuri.

== Recognition ==
He received the Harindra Dave memorial award in 2005, the Shoonya Palanpuri award in 2009, the Kalapi Award in 2009, and Kumar Suvarna Chandrak in 2010. Gujarat Sahitya Akademi awarded him in 2005 for his ghazal anthology Chhodi Ne Aav Tu and Gujarati Sahitya Parishad awarded him the Dilip Mehta award for the same book in 2005. His book Lalitasahashtrinaam was awarded by Sanskrit Sahitya Akademi in 2011 and he received the Shri Arvind Gold Medal in 2012. He received the Vali Gujarati Award in 2014. He received the 2021 Narsinh Mehta Award.

== See also ==
- List of Gujarati-language writers
