= Dileep Jhaveri =

Indian Gujarati-language poet, playwright, translator, editor and physician (Born: 1943)

- Born: Dileep Manubhai Jhaveri; 3 April 1943 (age 83); Mumbai, India
- Education: Savitribai Phule Pune University
- Occupations: Poet, playwright, translator, editor, physician
- Writing career
- Language: Gujarati
- Notable awards: Sahitya Akademi Award (2024)

Dileep Manubhai Jhaveri (born 3 April 1943) is an Indian Gujarati-language poet, playwright, translator, editor and physician from Mumbai, India. He is a recipient of the Sahitya Akademi Award (2024).

== Biography ==
Dileep Jhaveri was born on 3 April 1943 in Mumbai, India to Manubhai Jhaveri. He serves on the editorial board of Kobita Review, a Kolkata-based bilingual (Bengali and English) journal, and is Muse India's contributing editor for Gujarati language.

== Works ==
Jhaveri published a collection of Gujarati poetry entitled Pandukavyo ane Itar in 1989, followed by Khandit Kand ane Pachhi (2014) and Kavita Vishe Kavita (2017). Vyasochchvas (2003) is a play written by him, which was translated into English as A Breath of Vyas by Kamal Sanyal. Many of his poems have been anthologised and translated into English, Hindi, Marathi, Malayalam, Bengali, Korean, Chinese, Japanese and Irish. He has edited an anthology of contemporary Gujarati poetry in English translation titled Breath Becoming a Word. The poet Gabriel Rosenstock has translated his works into Irish.

== Recognition ==
Jhaveri received the Critics Award in 1989, the Jayant Pathak Poetry Award in 1989 and the Gujarati Sahitya Parishad award in 1990. He was invited to the Asian Poets Conference in Korea in 1986 and Taiwan in 1995. He received the 2024 Sahitya Akademi Award for his poetry collection Bhagwan ni Vato.

Awards
| Preceded by Vinod Joshi | Recipient of the Sahitya Akademi Award winners for Gujarati; 2024 | Succeeded by Yogesh Vaidya |
