= Ashwamedh =

Gujarati drama

- Coverpage
- Author: Chinu Modi
- Cover artist: Shailesh Modi
- Language: Gujarati
- Subject: Indian Mythology
- Genre: Three-act play
- Set in: Ahmedabad
- Published: October 1986
- Publisher: Rannade Prakashan
- Publication place: India
- Media type: Print (Paperback)
- Pages: 102
- OCLC: 655662387

Ashwamedh (Gujarati: અશ્વમેધ) is a Gujarati language three-act play written by Chinu Modi. It has endured some controversy due to its bold and taboo theme. However, it is considered one of the finest works of Modi by several critics.

== Plot ==
The main character of the play Mohini is married to king Vichitrasen who has enjoyed sexual orgasm at the age of 16 while riding on horse. As per the rituals of Ashvamedha yajna, once the king becomes Chakravarti (an undisputed sovereign) the chief queen requires to have sexual intercourse with the horse. Knowing this fact, Mohini suggests his husband to organize Ashvamedha yajna at the beginning of the play. She tells the king that her wish is to see his husband as a Chakravarti king, but her main desire lies in having sex with horse. For the purpose of the yajna, she on her own chooses the horse named Bijak from the royal stable. As the yajna starts, she displays blind sexual attraction towards the horse while it was sent for yajna. At the end of the yajna, when she approaches for the ritual containing sexual act with the horse, she finds that Bijak (the horse) is very exhausted running whole of the year and has lost the charm it had earlier. Thus, she refuses to recognize the horse. Due to the unfulfilled desire of sex and anger she commits suicide on the spot with a sword. Thus, the play's end is tragic.

In the play, Chinu Modi has vividly described the crisis in the life of Vichitrasen and the soldiers who went for the yajna. Modi has used song (chorus) to signify a situation in the play.
