= Vali Gujarati Gazal Award =

Literary award in India, 2005–2014

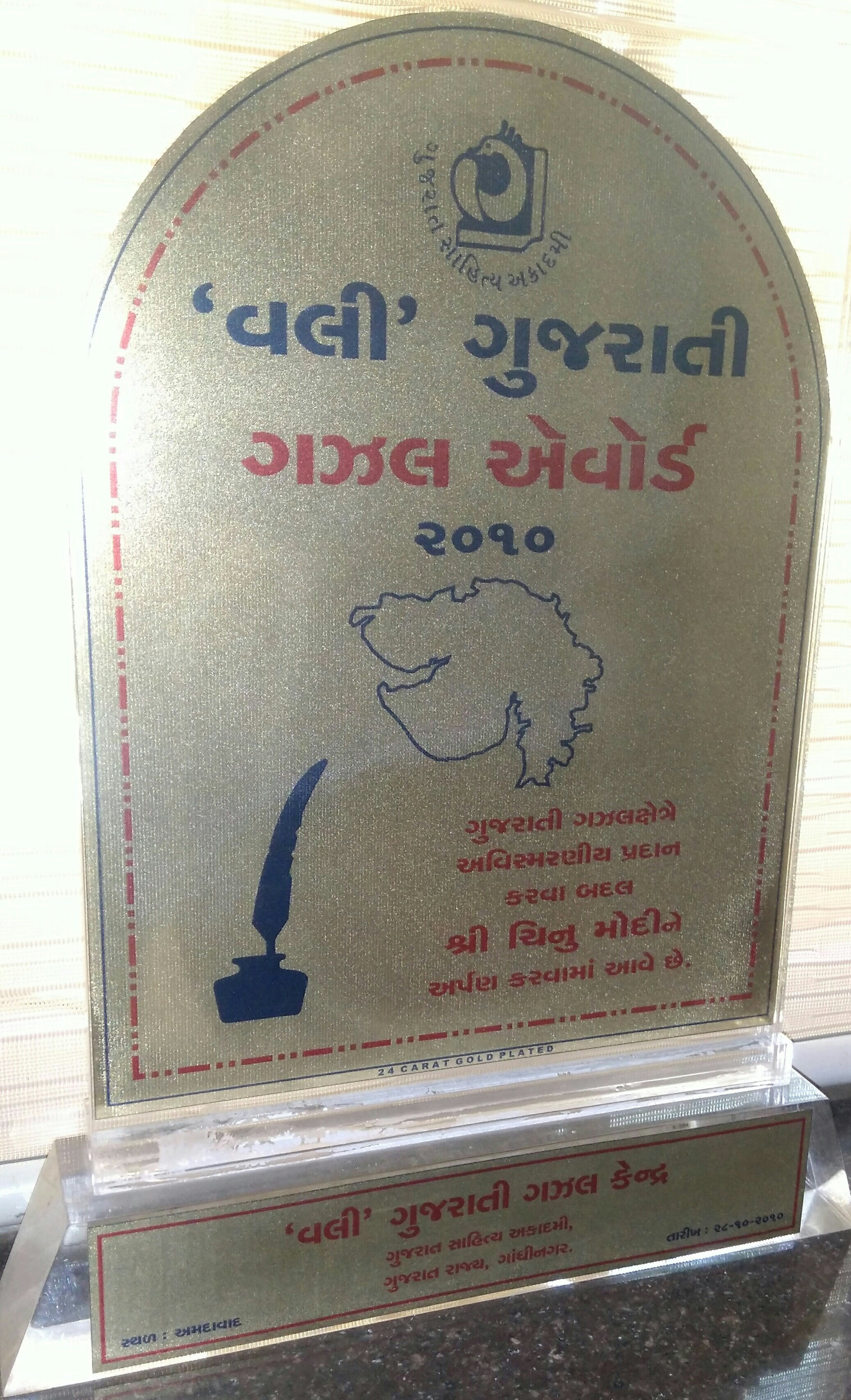
- Awarded for: Significant contribution in the field of Gujarati ghazal
- Sponsored by: Government of Gujarat
- Location: Gandhinagar
- Country: India
- Presented by: Vali Gujarati Gazal Kendra
- Reward: ₹ 1,00,000
- First award: 2005
- Final award: 2014
- Currently held by: Rajesh Vyas

Vali Gujarati Gazal Award is a literary honour in Gujarat, India. The award was instituted in 2005 by Vali Gujarati Gazal Kendra, run by Government of Gujarat, to perpetuate the memory of 17th century poet Vali Gujarati. The Award is conferred annually to the Gujarati ghazal poets.

== Recipients ==
Year	Recipients
2005	Asim Randeri
2006	Ratilal 'Anil'
2007	Jalan Matari
2008	Adil Mansuri
2009	Rajendra Shukla
2010	Chinu Modi
2011	Bhagvatikumar Sharma
2012	Harish Meenashru
2013	Khalil Dhantejvi
2014	Rajesh Vyas
