= Kalapi Award =

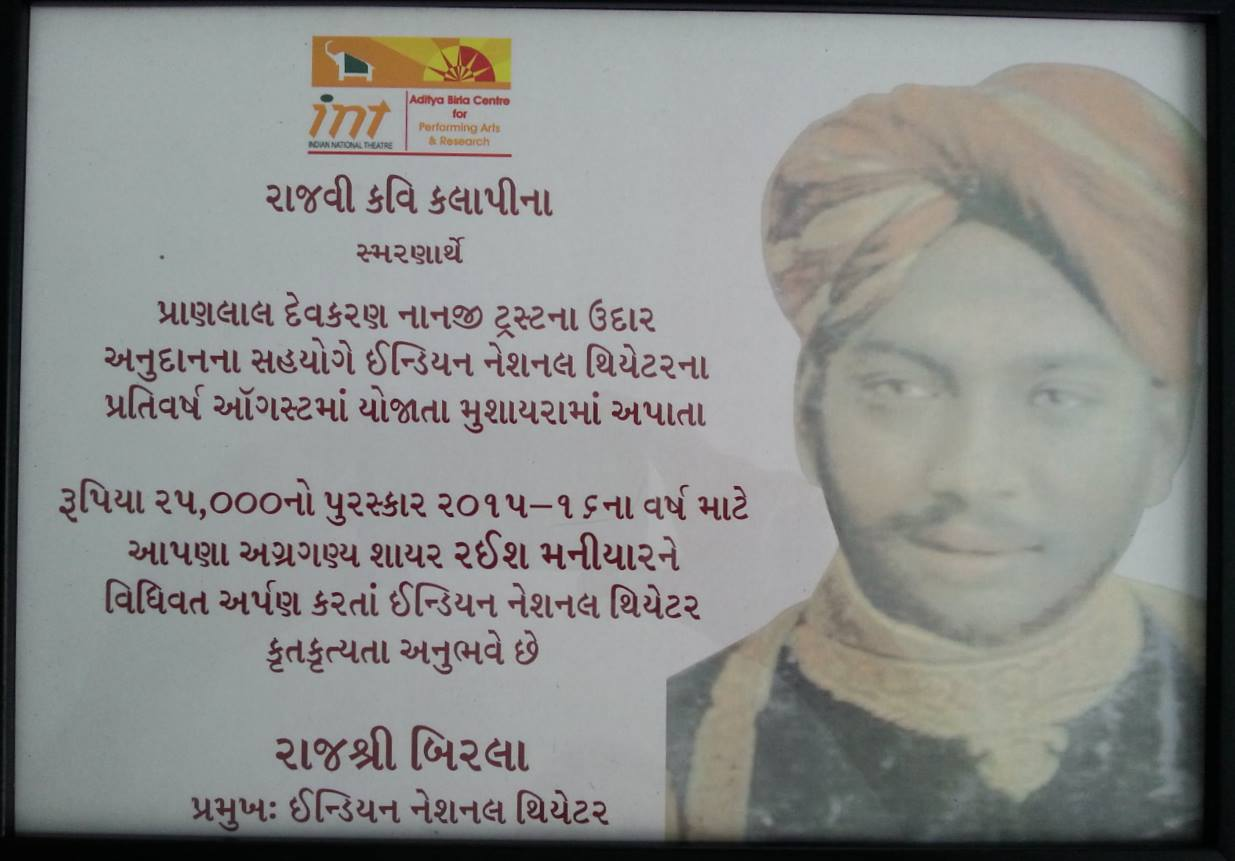
- Certificate of Kalapi Award
- Awarded for: Excellence in Gujarati ghazal poetry
- Sponsored by: INT Aditya Birla Centre for Performing Arts & Research
- Location: Mumbai
- Country: India
- Reward: ₹ 25000
- First award: 1997
- Final award: 2019
- Currently held by: Udayan Thakker
- Website: http://www.int-abc.org

The Kalapi Award (Gujarati:કલાપી ઍવોર્ડ) is an annual award given to Gujarati ghazal poets. It was founded by the INT Aditya Birla Centre for Performing Arts and Research. The award is named after Gujarati poet Kalapi, circa 1900 Thakor (prince) Sursinhji Takhtasinhji Gohil of Lathi state in Gujarat.. The amount of ₹ 25000 is awarded to recognize and promote Gujarati ghazal poets.

== Recipients ==
The Kalapi Award has been granted annually since 1997 to the following people:

Year	Recipient
1997	Amrut Ghayal
1998	Adil Mansuri
1999	Manoj Khanderia
2000	Chinu Modi
2001	Rajendra Shukla
2002	Manhar Modi
2003	Bhagwatikumar Sharma
2004	Khalil Dhantejvi
2005	Asim Randeri
2006	Jawahar Bakshi
2007	Asharaf Dabawala
2008	Ratilal 'Anil'
2009	Rajesh Vyas 'Miskin'
2010	Harish Meenashru
2011	Adam Tankaravi
2012	Harsh Brahmbhatt
2013	Nayan Desai
2014	Mukul Choksi
2015	Hemen Shah
2016	Raeesh Maniar
2017	Hemant Dhorda
2018	Vinod Joshi
2019	Udayan Thakker

== See also ==
- Kalapi
- Shayda Award
