= Manilal Desai =

Gujarati Poet

- Born: 19 July 1939; Gorgam (now in Valsad district, Gujarat)
- Died: 4 May 1966 (aged 26); Ahmedabad, Gujarat
- Education: Master of Arts
- Occupation: poet
- Writing career
- Language: Gujarati
- Period: Modern Gujarati literature
- Genres: geet, ghazal, metrical and non-metrical poetry
- Notable work: Raneri (1968; posthumously)

Manilal Bhagwanji Desai (1939–1966) was a Gujarati poet from India.

== Life ==
He was born in Gorgam (now in Valsad district, Gujarat) on 19 July 1939. He completed his BA with Gujarati and MA with Sanskrit in Mumbai and served as a lecturer in Gujarati at Zhunzhunwala College, Ghatkopar, Mumbai. He died at early age of 26 in Ahmedabad on 4 May 1966.

== Works ==
He was experimentalist writer. He was associated with little magazine movement and modernist movement in Gujarati.

His collection Raneri (1968), edited by Jayant Parekh, was published posthumously. It includes geet, ghazal, metrical and non-metrical poetry as well as prose poetry. Darkness is recurring theme in his poetry. Suresh Dalal has called him "the poet of colour, rhythm and movement of darkness". He was modernist in his approach. Gandhijina Shishyo was his first work. His "Umbare Ubhi Sambharu Re Bol Valamna" (Gujarati: ઉંબરે ઊભી સાંભરું રે બોલ વાલમના) is very popular song across Gujarat. This song depicts a rural woman waiting for and thus remembering her husband in her everyday deeds.

In 2018, Gujarati Vishwakosh Trust published his biography entitled Bol Valamna, written by Manilal H. Patel.

== See also ==
- List of Gujarati-language writers
