= Yagnesh Dave =

Indian Gujarati-language poet

- Born: 24 March 1954 (age 72); Rajkot, Gujarat, India
- Occupations: poet, essayist
- Writing career
- Language: Gujarati
- Notable work: Gandhmanjusha (2014)
- Notable awards: Sahitya Akademi Award (2021); Narsinh Mehta Award (2022)

Yagnesh Rameshchandra Dave (born 24 March 1954) is a Gujarati writer and poet from India. He received the 2021 Sahitya Akademi Award for his poetry collection Gandhmanjusha (2014).

== Biography ==
Yagnesh Dave was born on 24 March 1954 in Rajkot, Gujarat, India. He completed M.Sc. and obtained his Ph.D. in experimental biology. He worked as an assistant station director at Akashvani, Vadodara.

== Works ==
His first poetry collection, Jatismar, came out in 1992. It was followed by Jal ni Aankhe (1982), Andar Khulta Darvaja (2006) and Gandhmanjusha (2014). His essays are collected in Aaso ma Ughadto Ashadh (2000). Ghar Aangan na Pakshio and Vadadada ni Vato (1992) are his works of children literature.

== Awards ==
He received the 2021 Sahitya Akademi Award for his poetry collection Gandhmanjusha. He is a recipient of Jayanth Pathak Poetry Award and B. K. Thakore Award. He received the 2022 Narsinh Mehta Award.

Awards
Preceded by Harish Meenashru	Recipient of the Sahitya Akademi Award winners for Gujarati; 2021	Succeeded by Gulam Mohammed Sheikh
