= Mukul Choksi =

Gujarati Poet

Mukul Choksi is a Gujarati poet, psychiatrist and sexologist from Angat Clinic Surat, Gujarat, India. He is known for his ghazal poetry in Gujarati literature.

He was born on 21 December 1959 in Surat to Manharlal Choksi, a poet. He has published his poetry collections namely Tarannum, Taja Kalam Ma Ae J Ke and Sajanva. He has also published several books on sex education in Gujarati. He was awarded Kalapi Award in 2014 and Ramesh Parekh award from Sangat in 2019 for his contribution in the field of Gujarati Ghazal poetry. He was also awarded by Gujarat Sahitya Akademi.

== See also ==
- List of Gujarati-language writers
