= Asim Randeri =

Indian poet

- Born: Subedar Mahmood Mian Muhammad Imam; 15 August 1904; Rander, Surat, Gujarat, India
- Died: 6 February 2009 (aged 104); Rander, Surat, Gujarat, India
- Occupations: Poet, ghazal writer
- Writing career
- Pen name: Asim Randeri
- Notable awards: Vali Gujarati Award (2005); Kalapi Award (2005)

Asim Randeri, born Subedar Mahmood Mian Muhammad Imam (15 August 1904 – 5 February 2009), was a Gujarati language poet, mainly popular for his ghazals. He was a legend in Gujarati literature from the pre-independence era and recipient of the Vali Gujarati Award and Kalapi Award of 2005.

== Early life ==
Asim Randeri was born on 15 August 1904 in Rander area of Surat, Gujarat, India. He was born in an affluent family and studied till matric before working for a British company.

== Career ==
Asim Randeri started writing at the age of 18. He was working between 1928 and 1932 with the Kenya Daily Mail in East Africa. After 1932 he started working as a salesman with the Swedish Match Company in Bombay.

== Works ==
Randeri's works like Leela, Shanagar, Tapi Tirey and Gulchhadi with their bold style revolutionized Gujarati ghazal writing. Leela, a fictitious character created by Randeri, was a hit among youth. His love for this character continued and lived in the form of a magazine with the same title for six years. Tapi Tirey is a collection of Gujarati ghazals on love blossoming on the banks of the river Tapi, considered to be the lifeline of Surat, which had become hub of Gujarati ghazal in the 1920s.
Manhar Udhas, famous Gujarati Ghazal singer made many of Asim's ghazals famous in early 2000s.

== Personal life ==
Asim Randeri died of old age at an age of 104 years. He died in his hometown, Rander, and was buried at the Goregarima graveyard.

== See also ==
- List of Gujarati-language writers
