= Chinu Modi =

Indian Gujarati-language poet, novelist, short story writer and critic (1939–2017)

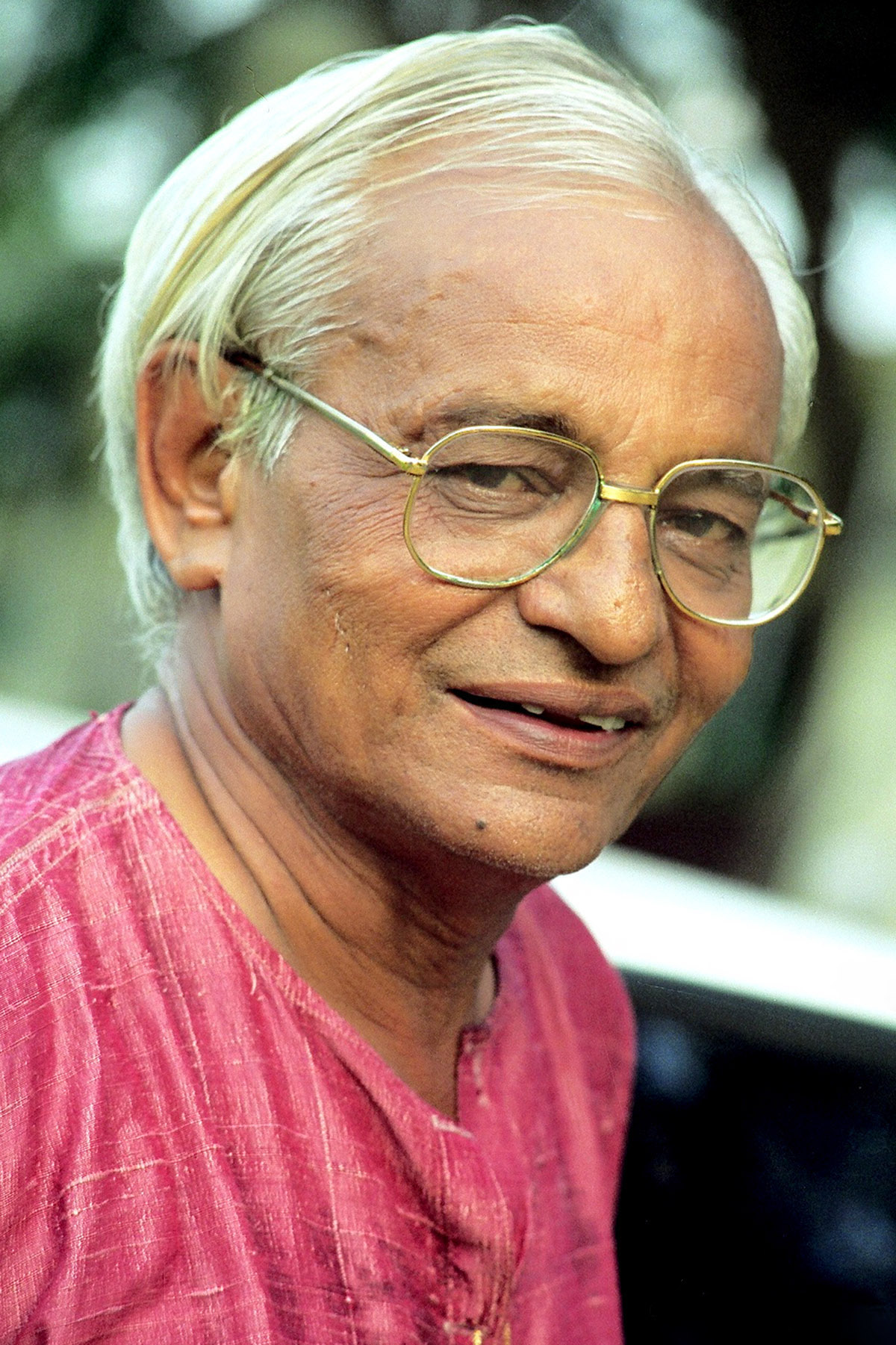
- At Ahmedabad, 1999
- Born: Chinu Chandulal Modi; 30 September 1939; Vijapur, Gujarat, British Raj
- Died: 19 March 2017 (aged 77); Ahmedabad, India
- Education: Master of Arts; Ph.D
- Alma mater: Gujarat University; Gujarat Vidyapith
- Occupations: poet, novelist, short story writer, critic
- Writing career
- Pen name: Irshad
- Language: Gujarati, Urdu
- Period: postmodern Gujarati literature
- Notable works: Ashwamedh (1986); Bahuk (1982); Kalakhyan (2003)
- Notable awards: Ushanas Prize; 1982-1983; Narsinh Mehta Award; 2008; Vali Gujarati Gazal Award; 2010; Sahitya Akademi Award; 2013
- Movements: Hotel poets group; 'Re' Math
- Chinu Modi's voice "Shwasma Chhalkay Chhani Gandh To", a Gujarati poem by Chinu Modi

Chinu Modi (30 September 1939 – 19 March 2017), also known by his pen name Irshad, was a Gujarati language poet, novelist, short story writer and critic from Gujarat, India. Educated in languages, he taught at various institutions and established himself as a poet and author. He was a recipient of several awards including Sahitya Akademi Award, Vali Gujarati Award and Narsinh Mehta Award.

== Early life ==
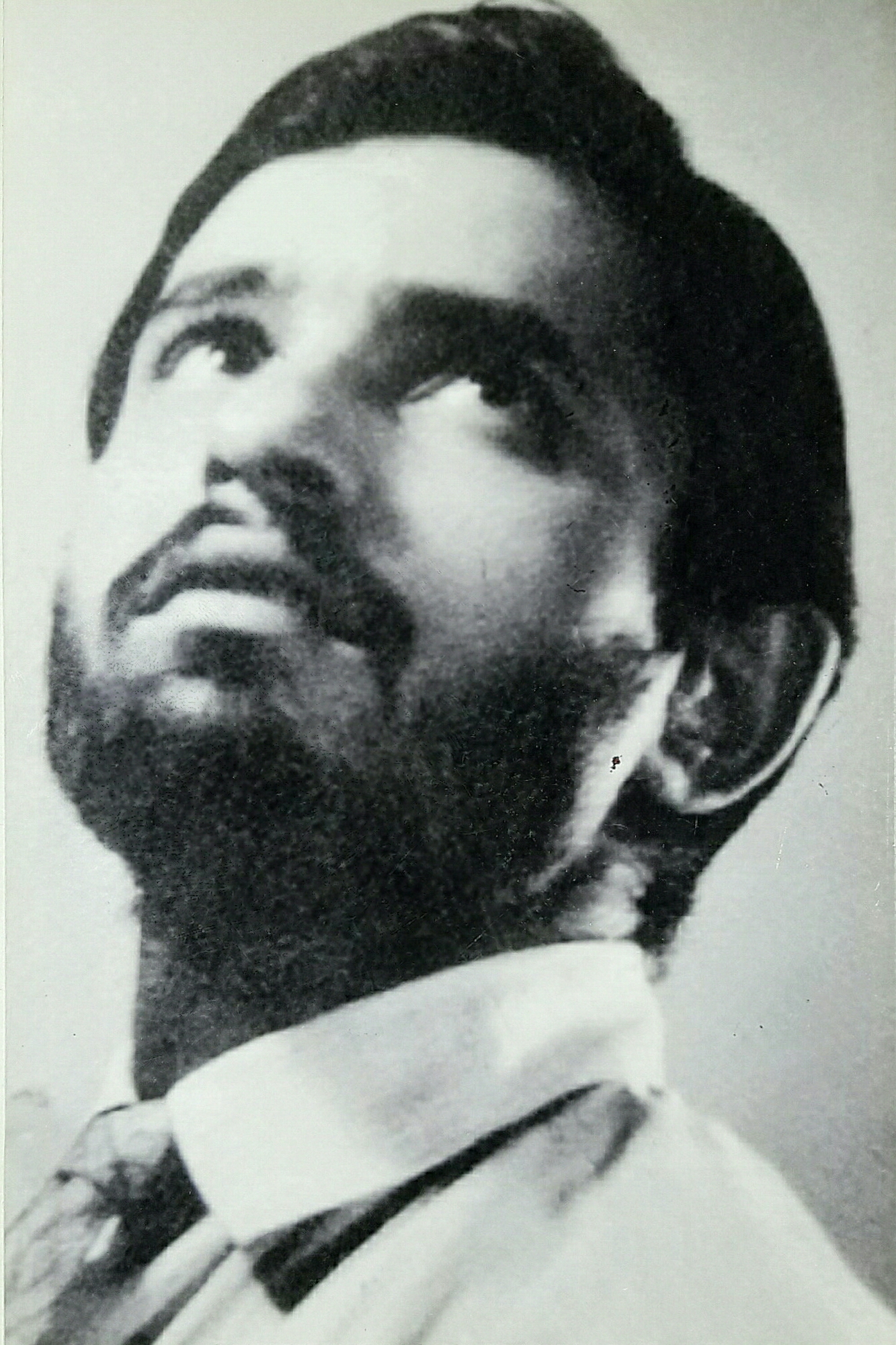
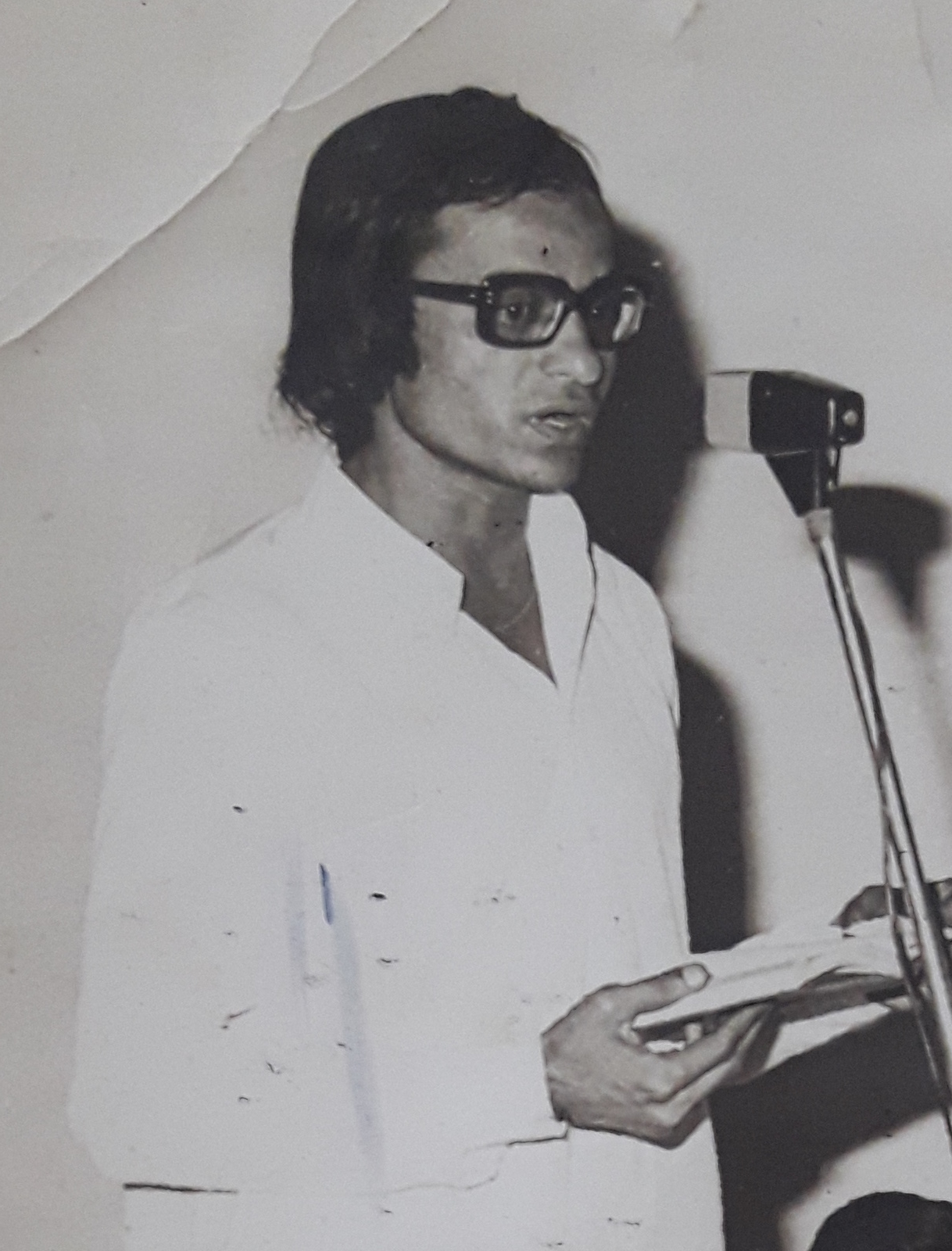
Young Chinu Modi

Modi was born in Vijapur on 30 September 1939 to Chandulal and Shashikantaben. His family belonged to Kadi. He completed his primary education in Vijapur and secondary education from Sheth Hasanali High School in Dholka near Ahmedabad. He completed his matriculation in 1954.

He completed a B.A. in Gujarati and History in 1958 from St. Xavier's College, Ahmedabad, an LL.B. in 1960 from Sir L.A. Shah Law College in Ahmedabad, and an M.A. in Gujarati and Hindi subjects in 1961 from Gujarat University. He earned a Ph.D. in 1968 from Gujarat Vidyapith for his research Gujarati Bhashama Khandakavya (narrative poetry in Gujarati language). His guide for Ph.D. was Mohanbhai Shankharbhai Patel.

== Personal life ==
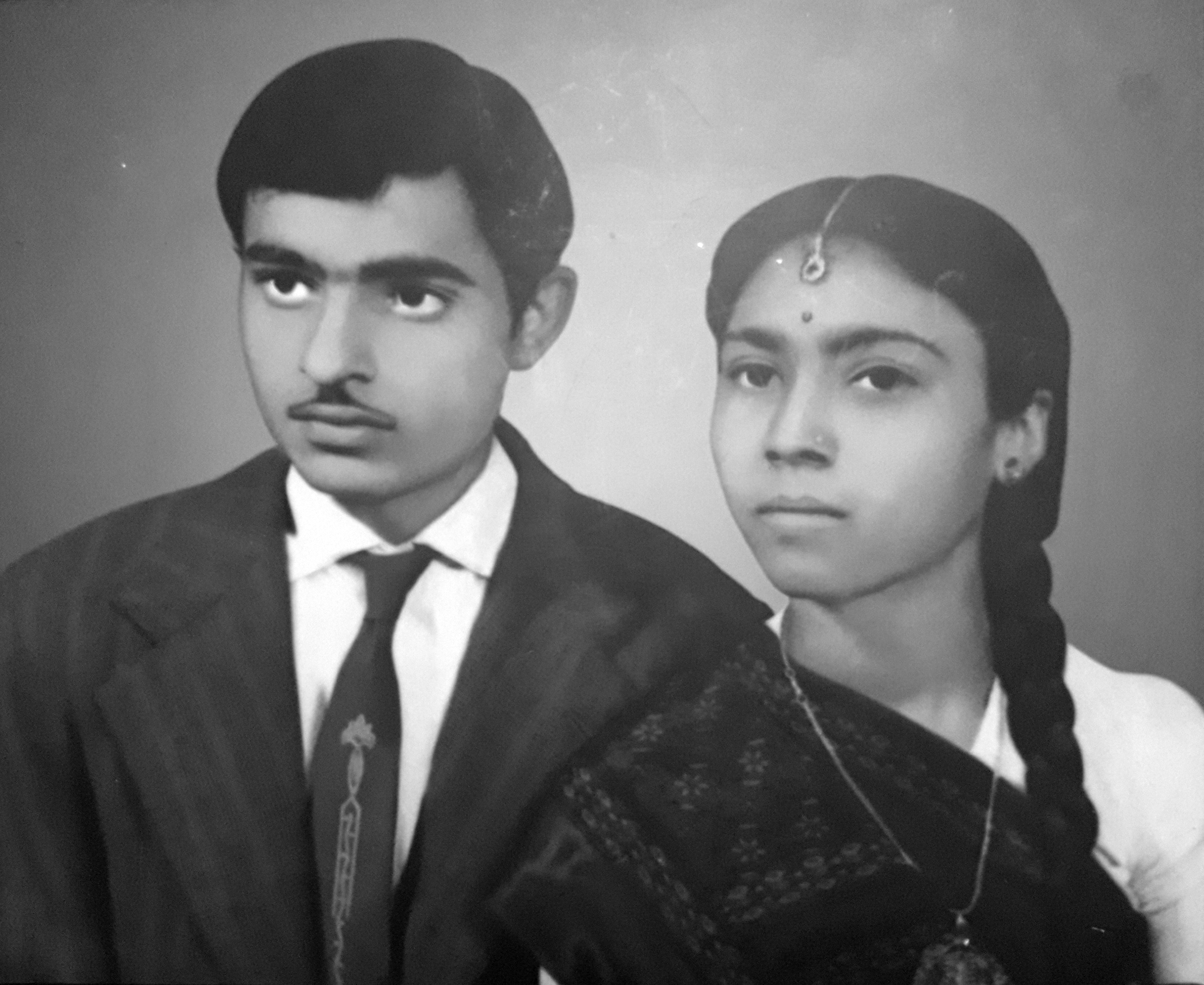
Poet Chinu Modi with his wife Hansa

He married Hansa on 21 June 1958 who predeceased him on 2 March 1989. They had a daughter, Nimisha Bhatt, and two sons, Ingit Modi and Utpal Modi.

== Career ==
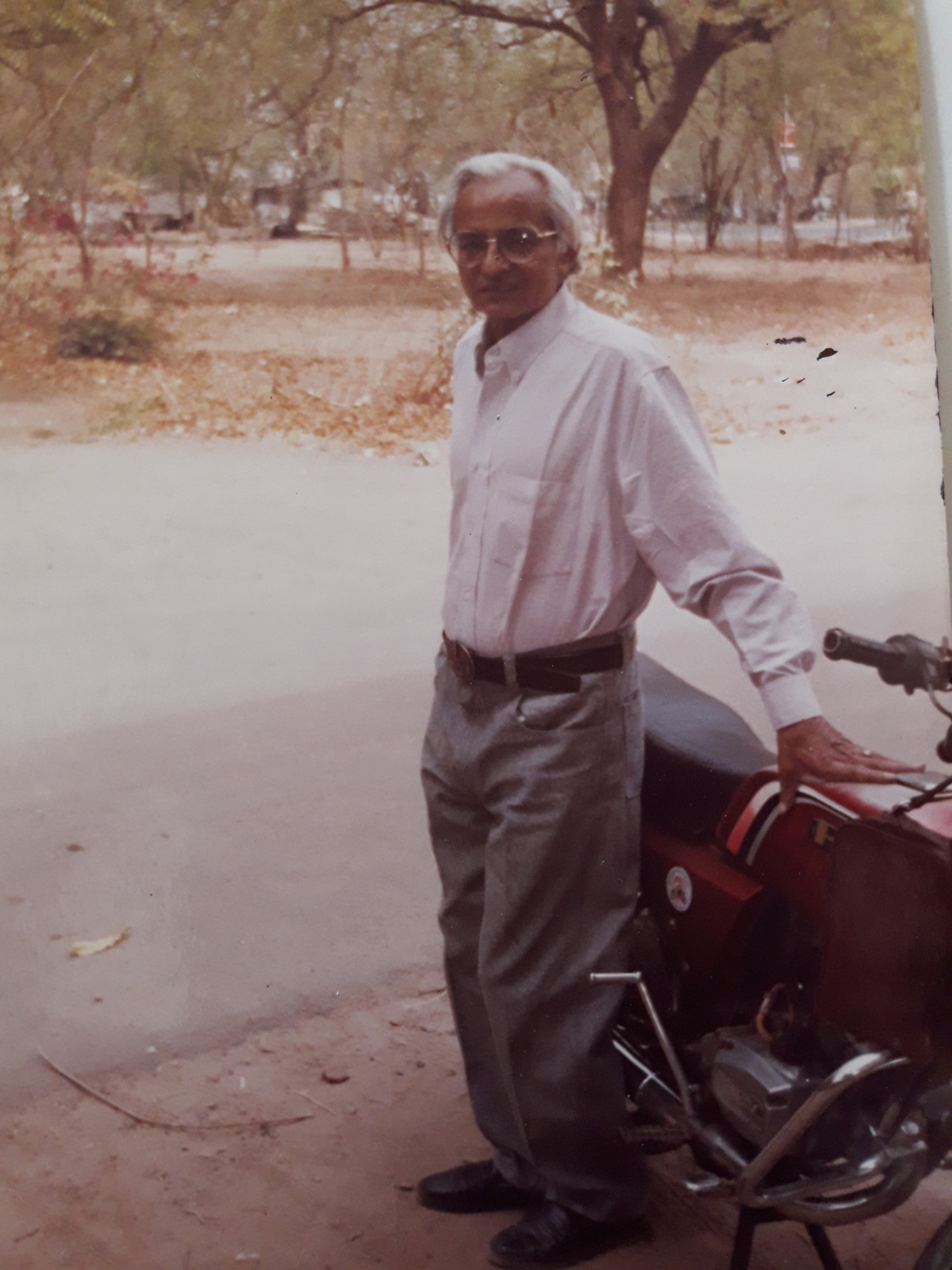
At Gujarat University, Ahmedabad, 1995

He joined H. A. Arts College in Ahmedabad and worked from 1961 to 1963. He taught at colleges in Talod and Kapadvanj later. In 1965, he joined Swaminarayan Arts College in Ahmedabad and taught until 1975. He served as a scriptwriter at Indian Space Research Organization, Ahmedabad from 1975 to 1977. In 1977–1978, he worked with Mansa College and Sabarmati Arts College. He joined L. D. Arts College in 1978 as a part-time professor. In 1994, he joined School of Languages, Gujarat University as a Reader and retired in 2001. He had also served as Dean-in-charge of Department of Journalism, M. S. University, Baroda from 1992 to 1994. He worked as a freelancer in field of advertising for few years.

From 1979 until his death, he was chairman of the Kriti Film Cooperative Society. In 1979, he won a Writer Fellowship from the Department of Culture, New Delhi.

== Works ==
=== Literary career ===
Modi was a pioneering poet and also an acclaimed playwright, critic, fiction writer and translator. His works are translated into English, Hindi and other Indian languages and his plays are staged several times. Gujarati famous Poetry of Chinu Modi | RekhtaGujarati He had written both metrical and non-metrical form of poetry. His main contribution was in ghazal poetry. Along with ghazals, he had written in various genres; geet, sonnet, free verse and Khandakavya (long narrative poem).

He started writing poetry in 1955. Vyatan (1963) was his small and first poetry collection. His other poetry collections which consist of metrical and nonmetrical poems are Urnanabh (1974), Shapit Vanma (1976), Deshvato (1978), Kshano Na Mahelma, Darpan Ni Galima (1975), Irshadgadh (1979), Afawa (1991), Inayat (1996) and Nakashanagar (2001), Vi-nayak (1996), Ae (1999), Saiyar (2000), Shwetsamudro (2001), Gatibhas (2012), Agha Pachha Shwas (2007) and Khara Zaran. Bahuk (1982), based on Nalakhyan of Mahabharata, is a long narrative poem written by him. Kalakhyan (2003) is also long narrative poem composed in the Akhyana-style. His all muktak poetry, a subgenre of ghazal poetry, was published as A-mrut Muktako in 2016.

=== Plays and novels ===
Modi is noted in Gujarati literature for his experimental plays. Dayal Na Pankhi (1967) is his first collection of one-act plays composed in a verse form and absurd style, followed by Callbell (1973), Hukam Malik (1984), Jalaka (1985), Ashwamedh (1986), Raja Midas (1992). Jalaka centred around the Jalaka, a character from the Ramanbhai Nilkanth's Raino Parvat while Ashwamedh deals with extreme lust of woman and her sexual interaction with Horse. His other plays are Navalsha Heerji (1995), Khalifano Vesh Yani Aurangzeb (1993), Naishadhray (1996), Shukdan (2000), Memory Lane (2008), Matsyavedh (2006), Dholido (2008), Buddhidhan (2008), Natyavali (2014). His Shukdan is a Gujarati adaptation of Edmond Rostand's French tragi-comedy Cyrano de Bergerac and it is directed by Chintan Pandya.

Modi debuted in novel with Shaila Majmudar (1966; an autobiographical novel), followed by Bhaav-Abhaav (1969), Bhavchakra (1975), Leela Naag (1971), Hang Over (1985), and Pahela Varsad No Chhanto (1987), Kalo Angrej (1992), Manas Howani Mane Cheed (1996), Pichho (2004), Lisoto (2000), Daheshat (2004), Chukado (2004), Padchhayana Manas (2008), Nindrachar (2008).

Dabi Muththi Jamani Muththi (1986) and Chhalang (1997) are his collections of short stories.

Mara Samkalin Kavio (1973) and its expanded edition Be Dayaka: Char Kavio (1974) are a criticism of poetry of Manilal Desai, Ravji Patel, Labhshankar Thakar and Manhar Modi. His thesis Khandkavya-Swaroop ane Vikas (1974), Krishnalal Shridharani (1979) and Madhyakalin Gujarati Kavitanu Mulyankan (2008) are his other works. He edited Chandravadan Mehta's selected poetry in Chadho Re Shikhar Raja Ramna (1975). He also edited ghazal collections, Gami Te Gazal (1976) and Gujarati Pratinidhi Gazalo (1996). He had translated Vasantavilas, a medieval Gujarati fagu. He co-edited Madhya Yugin Urmikavyo (1998), a compilation of medieval Gujarati poems, with Chimanlal Trivedi.

Jalsa Avtar (2014) is his memoir.

He started Hotel Poetry Club, also known as Hotel Poets Group, where he used to encourage young friends to read, write and to critique.

== Awards ==
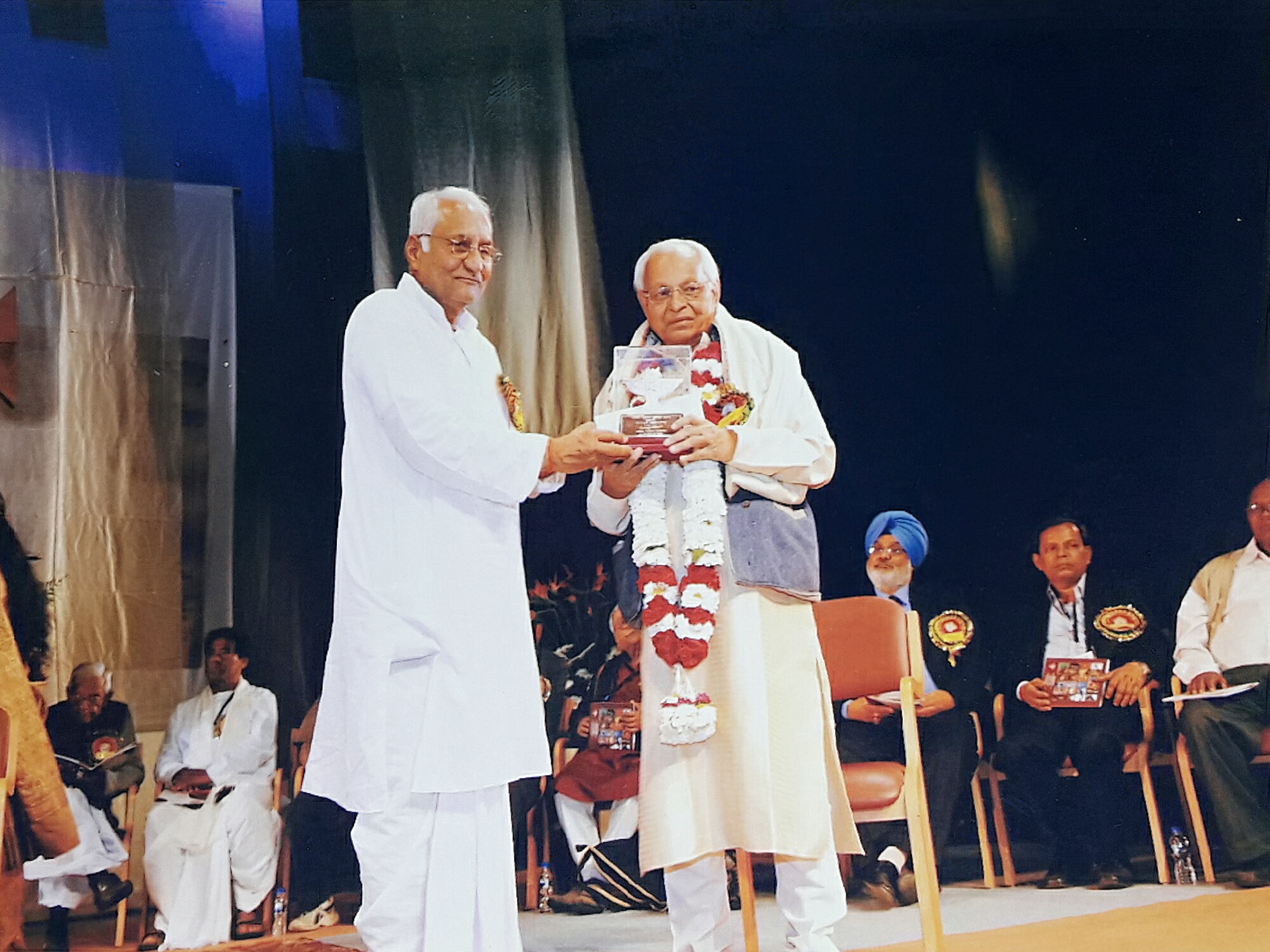
at Sahitya Akademi Award ceremony with Vishwanath Prasad Tiwari, New Delhi, 2013

Modi won the Ushnas Prize (1982–1983) for his book Bahuk. He received the Kalapi Award in 2000, the Narsinh Mehta Award in 2008 and the Vali Gujarati Award in 2010. He was awarded the Teansmedia Award in 2004. He received the Sahitya Akademi Award for Gujarati writers in 2013 for his gazal collection Khara Zaran.

== Death ==
He suffered from acute breathlessness. After a heart attack on 16 March 2017, he was admitted to HGC hospital located at Mithakhali, Ahmedabad as he was suffering from multiple organ failure. On 19 March 2017, he returned to his home at Paldi, Ahmedabad where he died in the evening. His body was donated to NHL Medical College as per his wish.

== See also ==
- List of Gujarati-language writers
