= Adil Mansuri =

Indian poet, playwright, and calligrapher

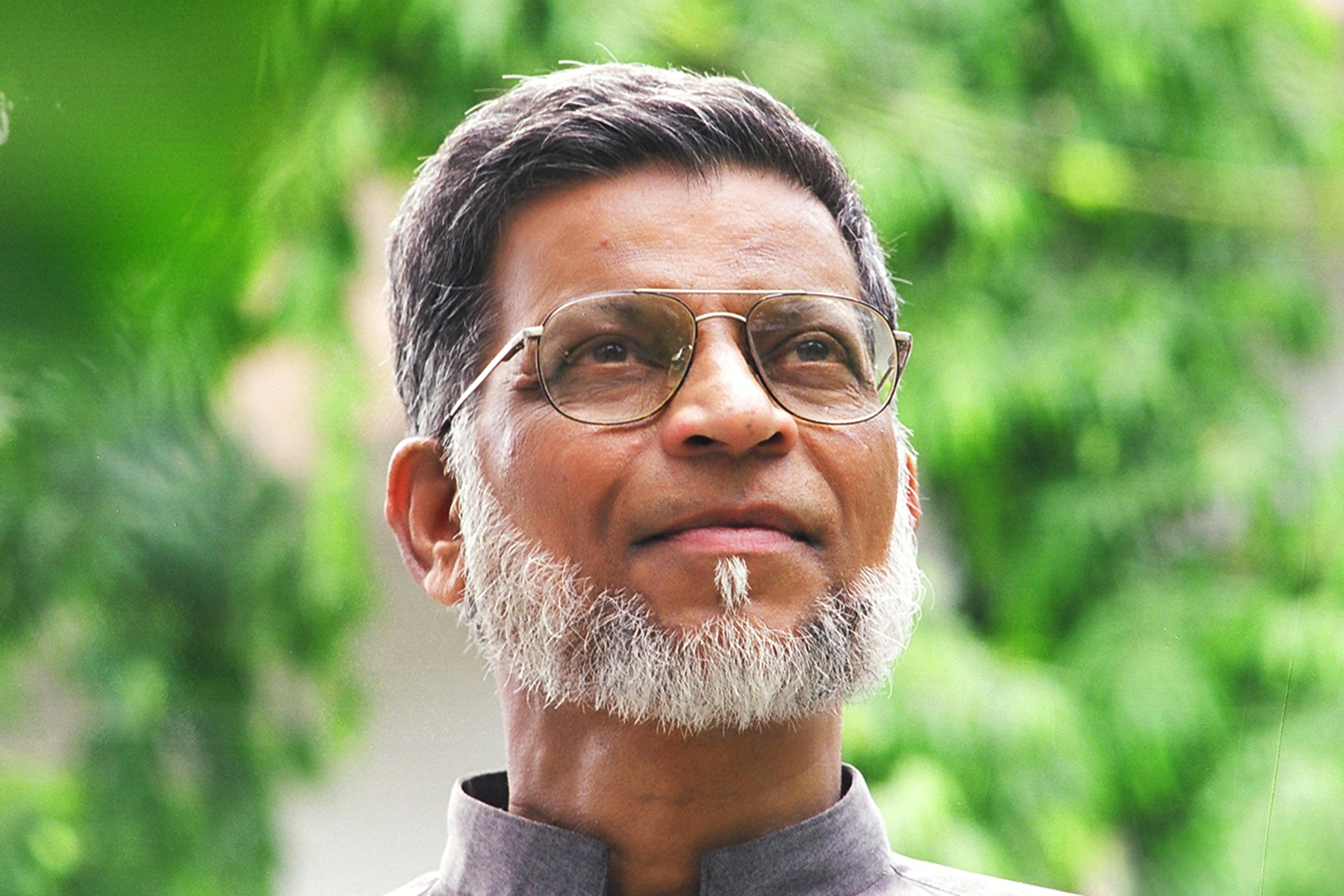
- Mansuri at Ahmedabad, 2005
- Born: Farid Mohammed Ghulam Nabi Mansuri; 18 May 1936; Ahmedabad, Gujarat
- Died: 6 November 2008 (aged 72); New Jersey, United States
- Occupations: Poet, Playwright, Calligrapher, Artist
- Writing career
- Genre: Ghazal
- Notable awards: Vali Gujarati Award - 2008; Kalapi Award - 1998

Farid Mohammed Ghulam Nabi Mansuri (18 May 1936 – 6 November 2008), better known by his pen name Adil Mansuri, was an Indian poet, playwright, and calligrapher, primarily responsible for the development of modern Gujarati ghazal poetry and plays. He wrote in several languages, namely, Gujarati, Hindi, and Urdu.

== Life ==
Adil Mansuri was born in Ahmedabad on 18 May 1936. He completed his primary education from Premchand Raichand Training College, Ahmedabad. He completed his secondary education from J. L. New English School, Ahmedabad and Metropolitan Highschool, Karachi. He completed matriculation. He tried his hand on several businesses. He worked at his father's cloth shop in Karachi and later at business of cotton and clothes in Ahmedabad. He also worked as journalist with English Topic and Gujarati Angana magazines. He was copywriter of advertising agency Shilpi in 1972. He left India and moved to United States. He died in New Jersey, US on 6 November 2008.

== Works ==
He was interested in experimental forms of ghazal. Valank (1963), Pagarav (1966), Satat (1970), New York Naame Gam, Male Na Male (1996, 2006), Gazalna Aynagharma (2003) are his ghazal collections. Though he wrote poetry in several other forms, he is chiefly known for his ghazals. His ghazals are influenced by Urdu ghazals. He wrote ghazals in Gujarati, Hindi and Urdu with free use of words of one language in other.

Haath Pag Bandhayela Chhe (1970) and Je Nathi Te (1973) are collections of his absurd one-act plays.

He was also a painter. In 1972, his art exhibitions were held in Ahmedabad and Mumbai.

== Awards ==
He received the Vali Gujarati Award in 2008. He received Kalapi Award in 1998.

== See also ==
- List of Gujarati-language writers
