= Rajendra Shukla (poet) =

Indian Gujarati-language poet (1942–2026)

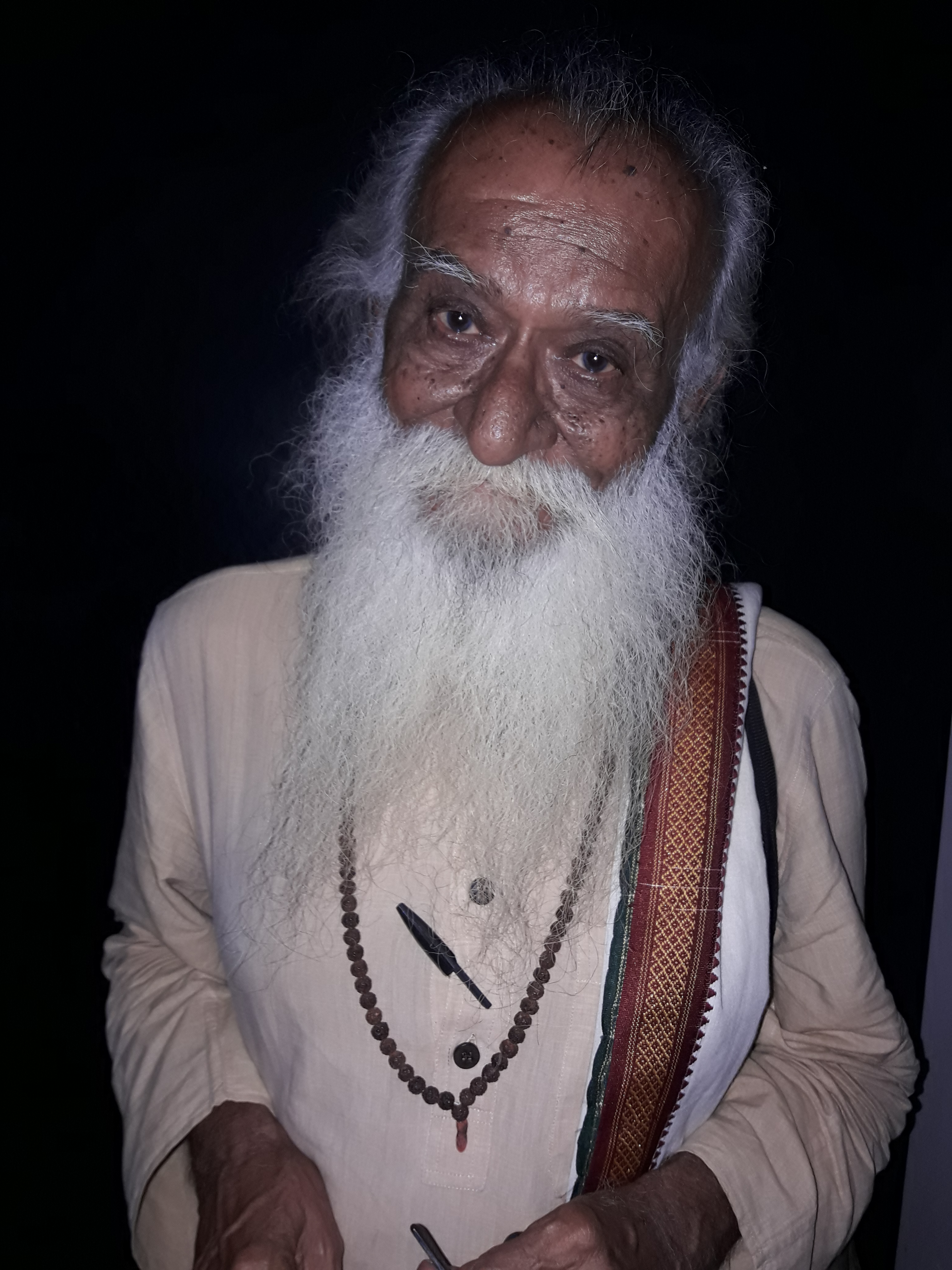
- Shukla in 2017
- Born: Rajendra Anantrai Shukla; 12 October 1942; Bantva, Junagadh State, India
- Died: 22 November 2026 (aged 84); Ahmedabad, Gujarat, India
- Education: Master of Arts
- Occupation: Poet
- Spouse: Nayna Jani
- Writing career
- Language: Gujarati
- Notable awards: Ranjitram Suvarna Chandrak (2006); Sahitya Akademi Award (2007); Vali Gujarati Gazal Award (2009)

Rajendra Anantrai Shukla (12 October 1942 – 22 November 2026) was an Indian Gujarati-language poet. He taught at various places before voluntarily retiring. He published several poetry collections which won him several major Gujarati literary awards.

== Early life and education ==
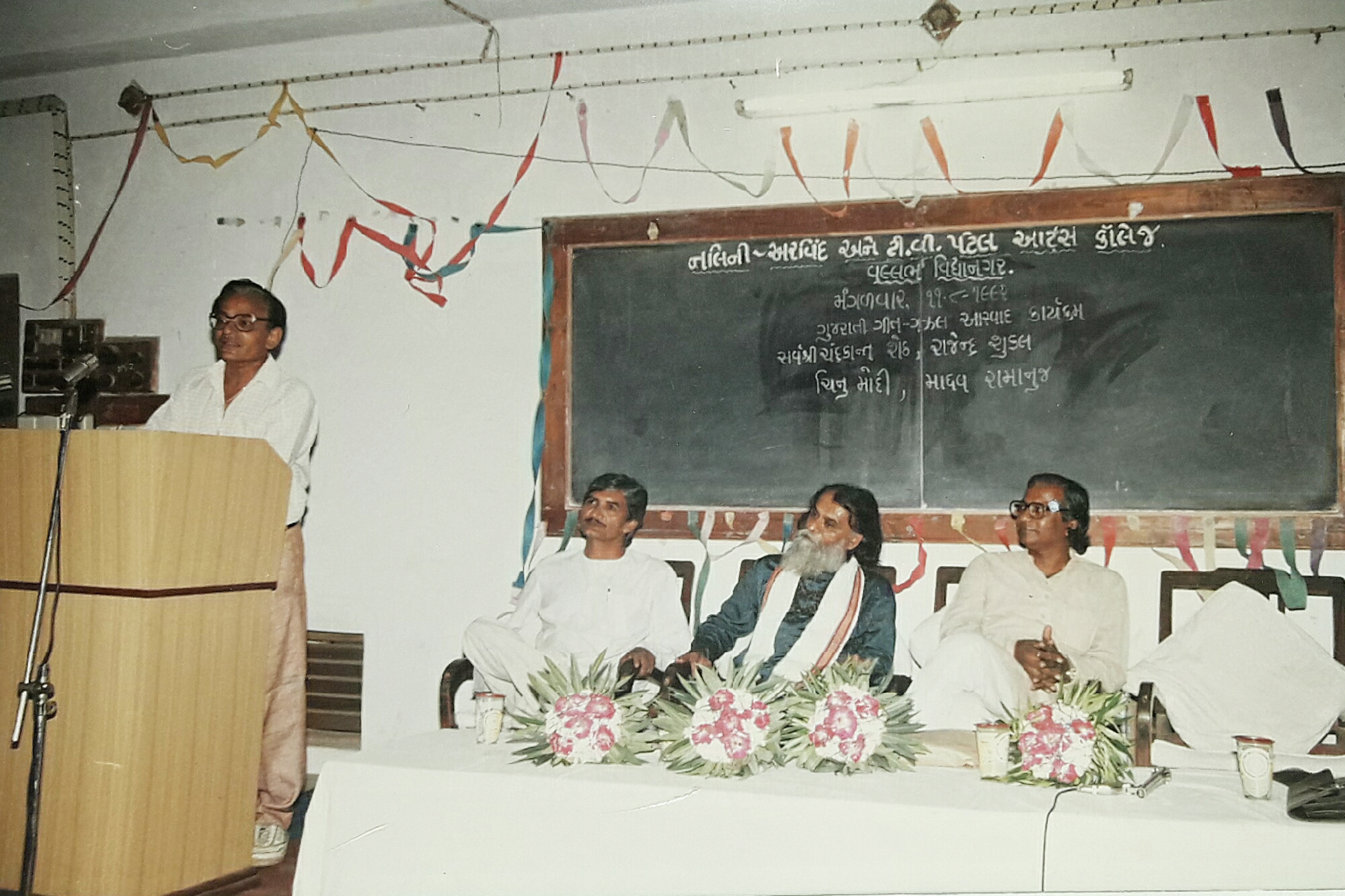
Chinu Modi on mic., then Chandrakant Sheth, Rajendra Shukla and Madhav Ramanuj at Vallabh Vidyanagar, 1992

He was born on 12 October 1942 in Bantwa village near Junagadh, Gujarat, India. His family is native of Wadhwan. He completed his primary education from Jamnagar, Bhavnagar, Bantwa and Majevadi. He completed his secondary education from Junagadh and Ahmedabad. He started his college education from Bahauddin College, Junagadh. He completed B.A. in 1965 in Sanskrit and Prakrit from L. D. Arts College, Ahmedabad and M.A. in the same subjects in 1967 from School of Languages, Gujarat University. He taught at various institutions until 1982.

== Works ==
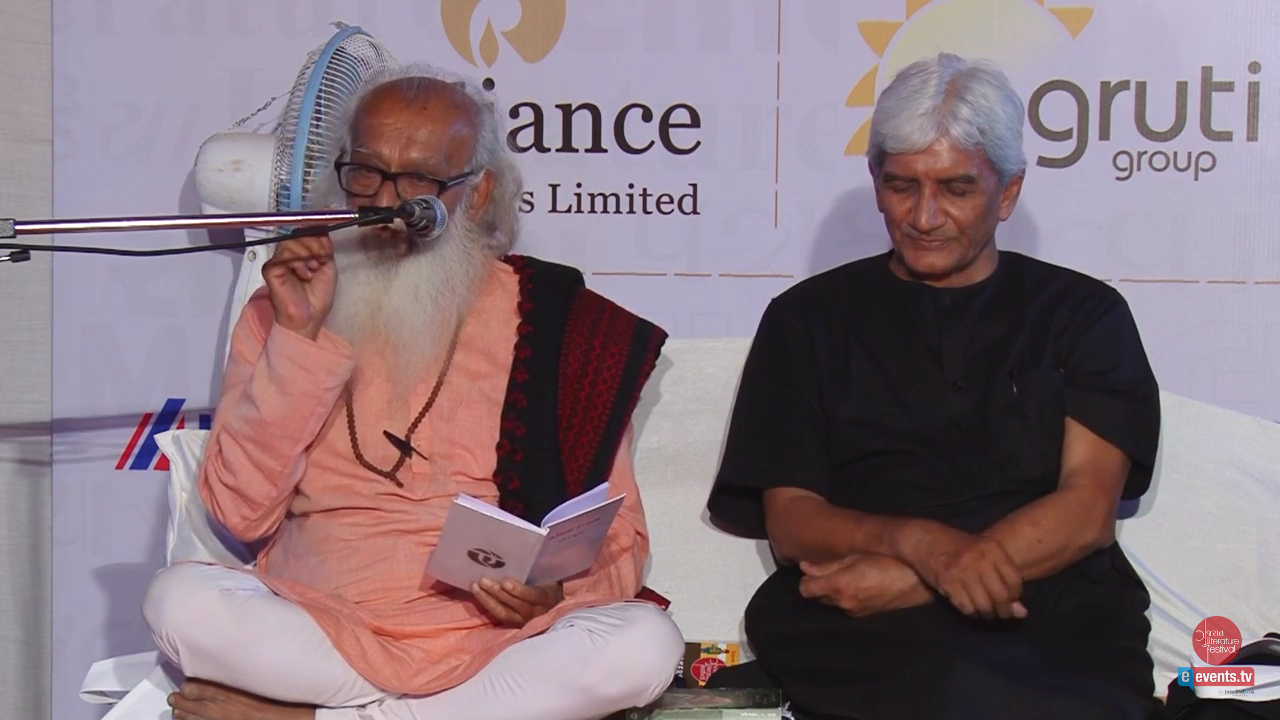
with Madhav Ramanuj in Gujarati Literature Festival, Ahmedabad, 18 December 2016

He studied poetry from Takhtasinhji Parmar along with Manoj Khanderia and Shyam Sadhu.

He was influenced by the poetry of Narasinh Mehta, a saint-poet of medieval Gujarat as well as modernist poetry of Re Math poets. His first poem was published in Kumar magazine in 1962. He published several poetry collections: Komal Rishabh (1970), Antar Gandhar (1981) and five volumes of Gazal Samhita (2005). Swavachakni Shodh (1972) is his long poem.

== Recognition ==
Shukla was awarded by the Government of Gujarat for the best anthology of poetry of 1970 for Komal Rishabh which he shared with poet Ramesh Parekh. He was again awarded by the Government of Gujarat for the best anthology of poetry of 1981 for Antar Gandhar. He was also awarded Kavi Nhanalal Prize in 1981 and Uma-Snehrashmi Prize, 1980–1981 for Antar Gandhar. He is a recipient of Gujarat Sahitya Academy Award for Ghazal Samhita as the Best Anthology of Gujarati poetry in 2005. He also received the Narsinh Mehta Award, the highest award being given to contemporary poet in 2006. He was awarded Sanskar Chandrak in 1980 and Ranjitram Suvarna Chandrak in 2006. He also received Sahitya Academy Award for Ghazal Samhita in 2007. He also received Narmad Suvarna Chandrak in 2008, Vali Gujarati Gazal Award in 2009, Lekharatna award and Kalapi Award in 2001.

== Personal life ==
Shukla married Nayana Jani, a Gujarati poet. After teaching Sanskrit at Dahod, he left teaching voluntarily in 1982 to educate his children without schooling as an experiment. He resided in Ahmedabad.

Shukla died in Ahmedabad on 22 November 2026, aged 84.
