= Suresh Dalal =

Suresh Purushottamdas Dalal
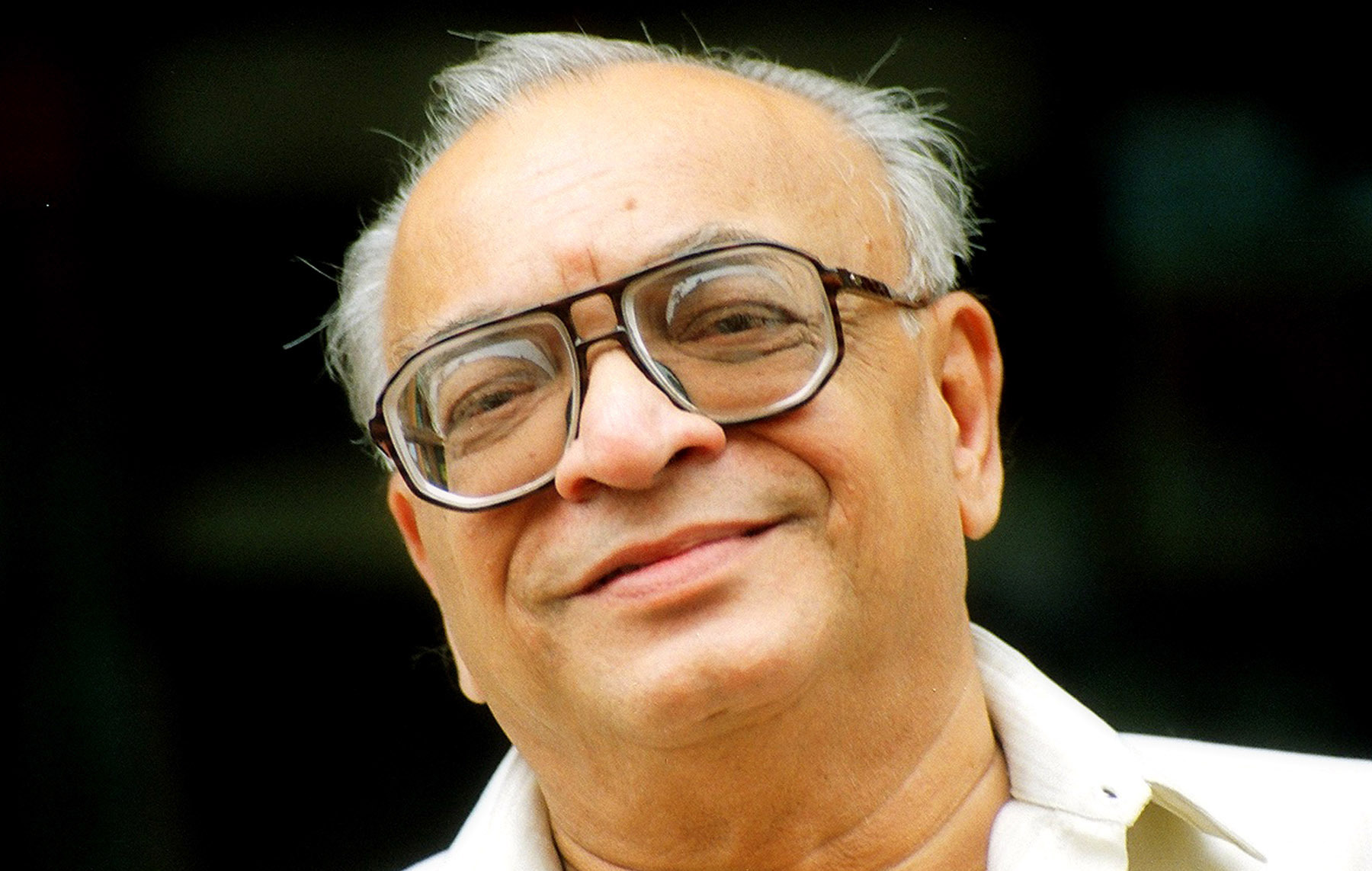
- Suresh Dalal at Image Publications, Mumbai, 2006
- Born: 11 October 1932; Thane, Maharashtra, India
- Died: 10 August 2012 (aged 79); Mumbai, India
- Education: Masters of Arts; PhD
- Occupations: Poet; essayist; editor
- Writing career
- Language: Gujarati
- Notable work: Akhand Zalar Vage
- Notable awards: Sahitya Academy Award (2005)

Suresh Parshottamdas Dalal (11 October 1932 – 10 August 2012) was a Gujarati poet, essayist, litterateur and editor.

== Life ==
Dalal was born on 11 October 1932 in Thane to Purushottamdas and Bhanumati. He completed B.A. in Gujarati in 1953 from Saint Xavier's College; M.A. in 1955 and PhD in 1969 from University of Mumbai. He taught at K. C. Arts College, Mumbai from 1956 to 1964. He also served as professor of Gujarati at Kirti College from 1958 to 1960 and at H.R. College of Commerce and Economics from 1960 to 1964. He joined K. J. Somaiya College in 1964 and headed the Gujarati Department. He later served as the Head of the Gujarati Department at SNDT Women's University; Vice-chancellor at Maharaja Sayajirao University of Baroda; and a "National Lecturer" for the UGC. He has also been a member of the advisory board of Gujarat Sahitya Academy from 1983 to 1987. He was also the editor of the Gujarati poetry journal Kavita and literary quarterly Vivechana.

He died on 10 August 2012 at Mumbai following a heart attack.

== Works ==
=== Poetry ===
His poetry collections include sonnets, long and prose-poems too. His poetry collections are Ekant (1966), Tarikh nu Ghar (1971), Astitva (1973), Naam Lakhi Dau (1975), Hastakshar (1977), Symphony (1977), Skyscraper (1980), Ek Anami Nadi (1982), Ghatana (1984), Bhura Akashni Asha.

== Awards ==
He received Sahitya Akademi Award for Gujarati writers in 2005 for his poetry Akhand Zalar Vage. He has been awarded with several other awards including the Gujarat Government Award 5 times. His Prose Poem has been translated into English by the Poetry Translation Centre.

== See also ==
- List of Gujarati-language writers
- List of Sahitya Akademi Award winners for Gujarati

Awards
Preceded by Amritlal Vegad	Recipient of the Sahitya Akademi Award winners for Gujarati; 2005	Succeeded by Ratilal 'Anil'
