= Manoj Khanderia =

Indian poet and Ghazal writer (1943–2003)

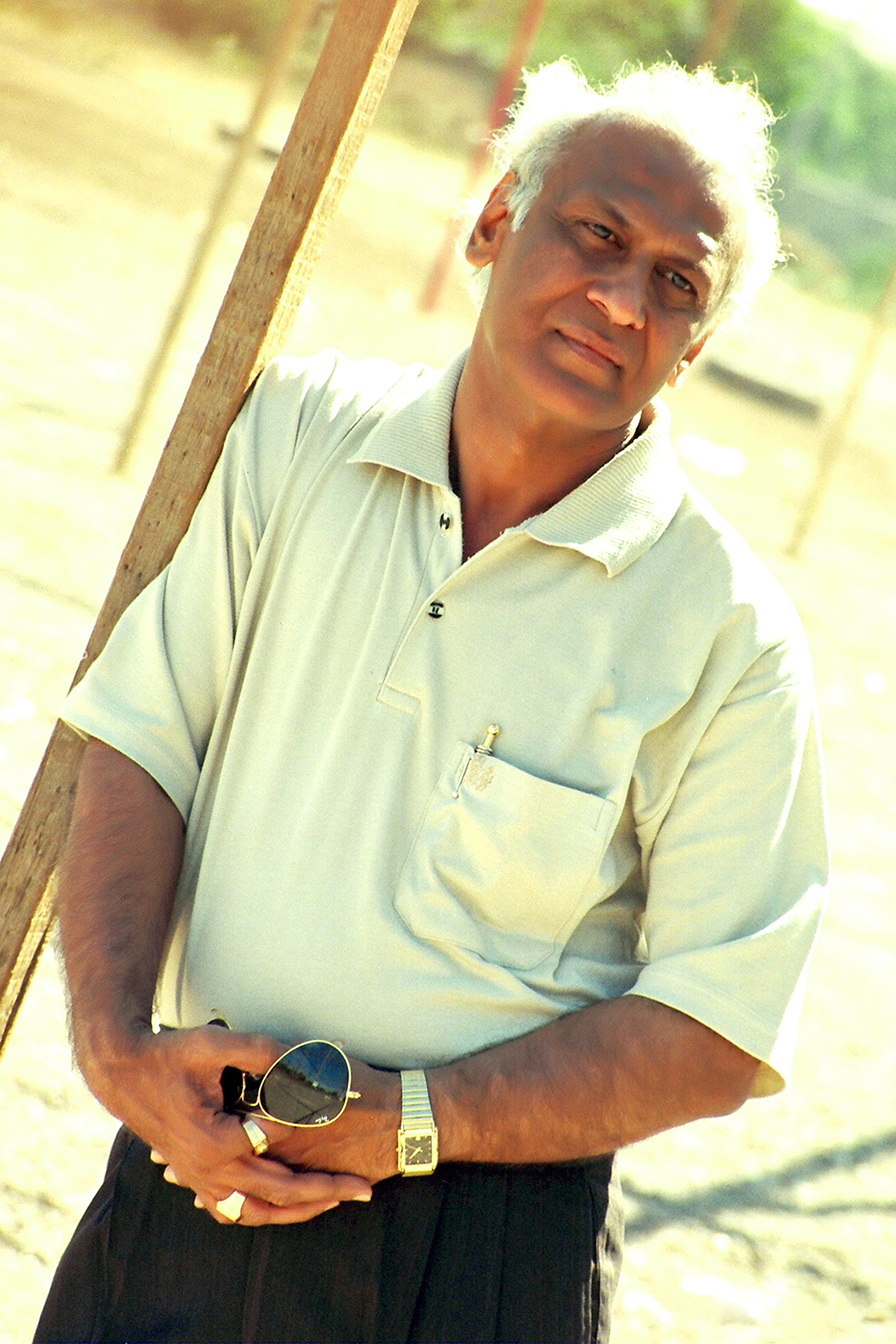
- Khanderia at Junagadh, 1996
- Born: Manoj Vrajlal Khanderia; 6 July 1943; Junagadh, Gujarat
- Died: 27 October 2003 (aged 60)
- Education: Bachelor of Science; Bachelor of Law
- Occupations: Poet, Advocate
- Spouse: Purnima
- Children: Vani, Rucha (daughters); Abhijat (son)
- Writing career
- Language: Gujarati
- Years active: 1960 - 2003
- Period: Modern Gujarati literature
- Genres: Ghazal, Geet, Free verse
- Notable works: Achanak (1970); Atkal (1979); Hastaprat (1991)
- Notable awards: Kalapi Award (1999); Dhanji Kanji Gandhi Suvarna Chandrak (2002)
- Website: Official website

Manoj Khanderia (6 July 1943 – 27 October 2003) was an Indian poet and a Ghazal writer of Gujarati language.

== Life ==
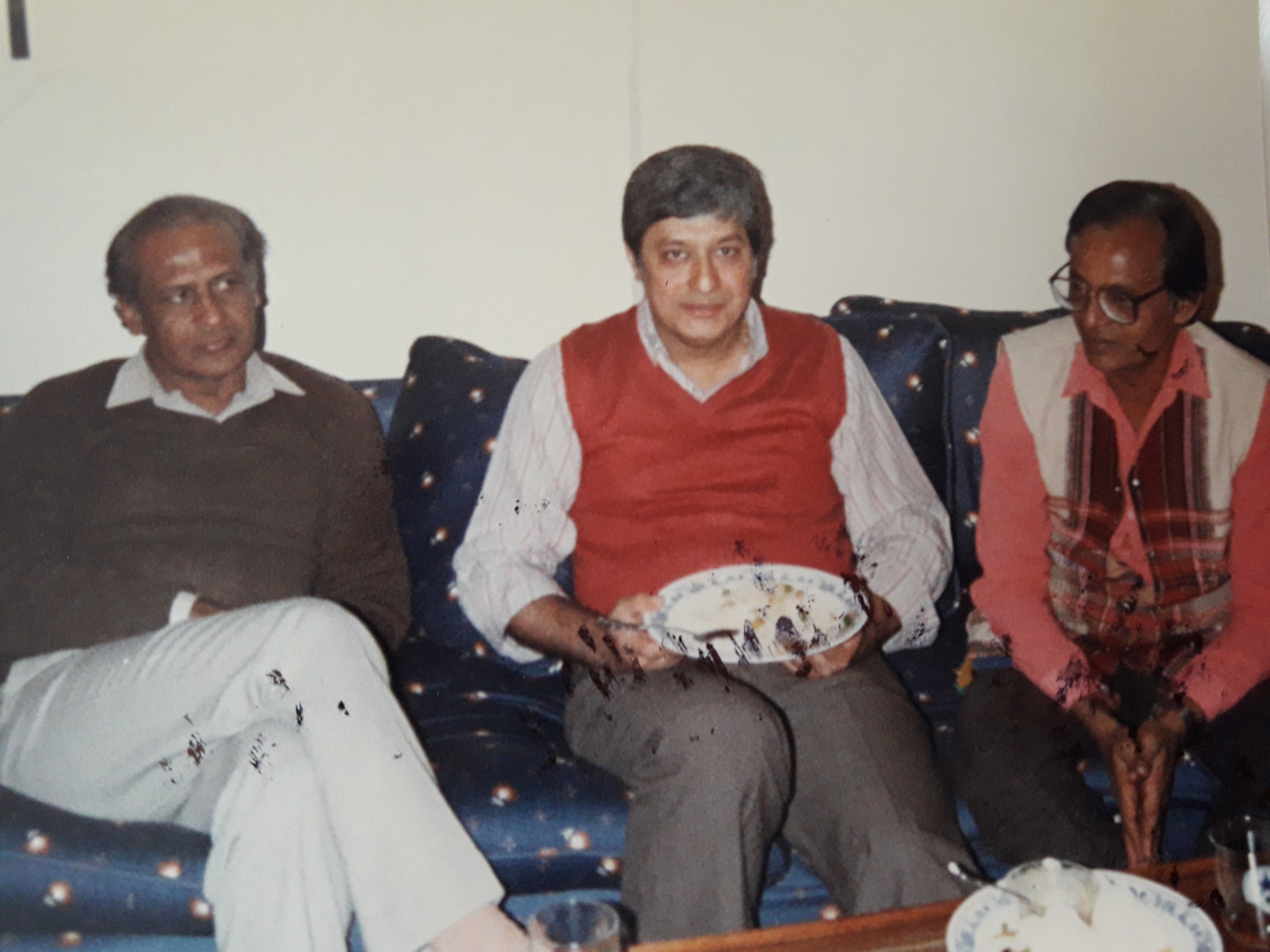
Manoj Khanderia (left) and Chinu Modi (right), U.S.A.,1997

He was born on 6 July 1943 in Junagadh, Gujarat to Vrajlal and Vijyabahen. He studied at various schools in various towns of Gujarat including Dhoraji, Veraval, Junagadh, Morbi, Rajkot and Jamnagar because his father was a revenue officer who was transferred several times. He passed SSC from Junagadh in 1961. He completed his Bachelor of Science in 1965 from Bahauddin College, Junagadh with Chemistry and Botany and Bachelor of Law in 1967. He married Purnimaben and they had two daughters, Vani and Rucha, and a son, Abhijat.

He started his career as an advocate in 1968. He also served as a lecturer of law from 1972 to 1984 and Commercial law from 1977 to 1981. He also worked as a lawyer from 1968. He started to write during 1959-60 under the guidance of professor Takhtasinh Parmar. In December 1965, his ghazal Divaalo (The wall) was published first time in Kumar, a Gujarati literary magazine. He died on 27 October 2003 at Junagadh.

== Works ==
He is widely known for his ghazals. He also wrote in other forms of poetry including Geet, Anjani Geet, metrical and non-metrical poetry. He, along with a group of noted Gujarati poets, transformed the Gujarati Ghazal and established its individual identity by giving it a modernist sensibility.

His poetry collections and anthologies include Achaanak (1970), Atkal (1979), Anjani (1991), Hastprat (1991), and Kyany Pan Gayo Nathi (posthumous, 2003). In his lifelong career as a poet, he also organized and was a part of countless mushairas, poetic symposia and recitals. He also helped found and served as the president of the Narsinh Mehta Shahitya Nidhi Trust.

Some of his most famous ghazals include 'Rasta Vasant Na', 'Pichhu', 'Koi Kehtu Nathi', 'Kshano Ne Todva Besu', 'Em Pan Bane', 'Pakdo Kalam Ne', 'Shabdo J Kanku Ne Chokha', 'Varso Na Varas Lage' and 'Shahmrugo'.

== Awards ==
He received several awards, including Sahitya Akademi Award (for Atkal and Hastaprat anthologies), the Gujarati Sahitya Parishad Award (for Hastaprat and Anjani anthologies), the Gujarat State award (for Achaanak anthology), the Kalapi Award in 1999, and the Dhanji Kanji Gandhi Suvarna Chandrak in 2003.

== See also ==
- List of Gujarati-language writers
