= Harindra Dave =

Indian poet (1930–1995)

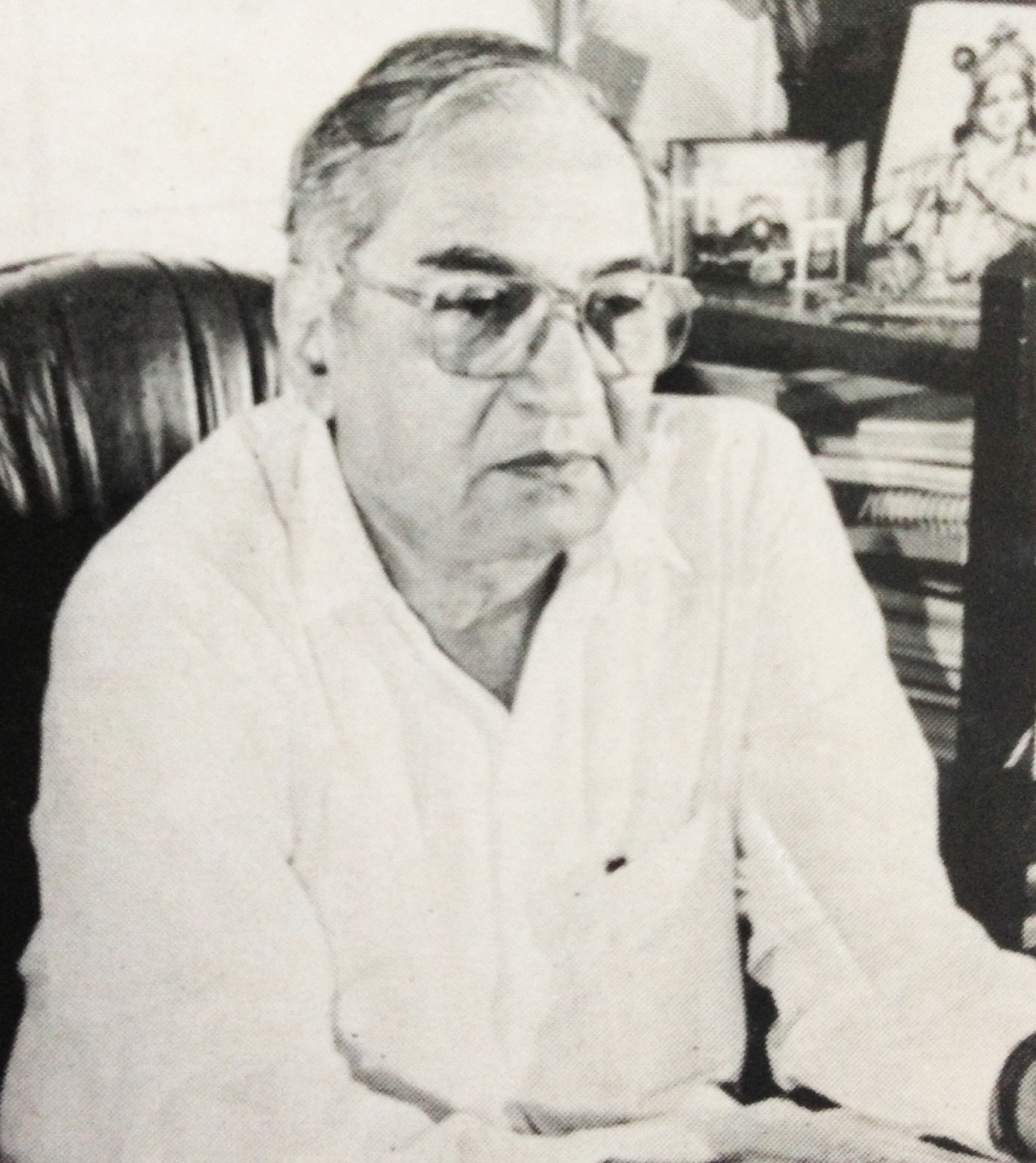
Harindra Dave

Harindra Jayantilal Dave (19 September 1930 – 29 March 1995) was an Indian Gujarati-language poet, novelist, playwright and journalist from Gujarat, India. He received the Sahitya Akademi Award (1978) for his poetry collection Hayati.

== Life ==
Harindra Dave was born on 19 September 1930 in Khambhra village in Kachchh District, Gujarat, India (then Cutch State). He was educated at the Samaldas College, Bhavnagar and later University of Bombay.

== Career ==
He authored more than fifty works, including poems, essays, drama and fiction.

Aganpankhi (1962), Madhav Kyayn Nathi (1970), Krishna ane Manav Sambandho (1982), Mukhvato, Anagat, Hayati (1978), Sang-Asang, Lohi no Rang Lal (1981), Gandhi Ni Kavad (1984) are some of his works. His work Krishna ane Manav Sambandho (1982) is a monumental research work on Krishna theme. His novel Madhav Kyany Nathi was translated into Hindi by Bhanushankar Mehta as Madhav Kahin Nahin Hain in 1995.

Journalism

He was a journalist by profession.

He worked as a journalist with Janashakti, a Gujarati daily from 1951 to 1962. He joined Bhavan's as an editor of Samarpan, Gujarati monthly digest. In 1968, he joined USIS and continued till 1973.

In 1973, he joined Janashakti as an editor. His writing during the Emergency was notable. After Janashakti, he joined Janmabhoomi Group of Newspapers as an Editor in Chief for 'Janmabhoomi', an evening daily, 'Pravasi', a morning daily and 'Janambhoomi-Pravasi, a weekly.

Before embarking on daily journalism in 1951, Harindrabhai worked with Chitrapat, a film magazine. And during those years with Chitrapat, he came into association with personalities like Shyam, Suraiya, Guru Dutt, Mehbub Khan, Motilal, Mohammad Rafi, Ramanand Sagar etc.

== Recognition ==
He received the Sahitya Akademi Award in 1978 for his poetry collection Hayati. He also received the Ranjitram Suvarna Chandrak in 1982, the Kabir Award (from the Madhya Pradesh Government), the Gujarati Sahitya Parishad award and the Goenka award for Journalism.

== Personal life ==
He married Jayalakshmi (25 May 1932 – 14 July 1987) in 1947. He had three sons from his first marriage: Rohit (born 1952), Prakash (born 1955) and Deepak (born 1960).

== See also ==
- List of Gujarati-language writers
