= Yogesh Vaidya (writer) =

Indian Gujarati-language writer and poet (Born: 1962)

- Born: Yogesh Madhusoodan Vaidya; 23 December 1962 (age 63); Bagasara, Gujarat, India
- Occupations: writer, poet, essayist, and translator
- Writing career
- Language: Gujarati
- Notable awards: Sahitya Akademi Award (2025)

Yogesh Madhusoodan Vaidya is an Indian Gujarati-language writer, poet, essayist, and translator. He was born on 23 December 1962 in Bagasara, Gujarat, and his native place is Junagadh. He holds a diploma in civil engineering. Vaidya has authored several works, including the poetry collections Hu J Dariyo, Hu J Bhekhad (1998), and Bhattkhadaki (2023), the long narrative poem Nekham (2025), and the essay collection Navo Utaro (2024). His translations of Assamese poetry are collected in Samprat Asamiya Kavita (Contemporary Assamese Poetry; 2023). He received the 2025 Sahitya Akademi Award for Bhattkhadaki. Vaidya edited an online magazine Nisyandan.

== See also ==
- List of Gujarati-language writers
