= Gujarat Mitra =

Indian newspaper

Gujaratmitra

- Type: Daily newspaper
- Format: Broadsheet
- Owner(s): Gujaratmitra Pvt.Ltd.
- Publisher: Bharat Pravinkant Reshamwala
- Editor: Bharat Pravinkant Reshamwala
- Founded: 1863
- Language: Gujarati
- Headquarters: Surat, Gujarat, India
- Price: 4 Rs
- Website: www.gujaratmitra.in

Guajratmitra (Gujarati: ગુજરાતમિત્ર) is a daily newspaper of Surat and Gujarat in India. It is published from Surat, in Gujarati. It was founded in 1863 and is one of the oldest newspapers of India.
