= Chandrakant Sheth =

Indian poet, essayist and critic (1938–2024)

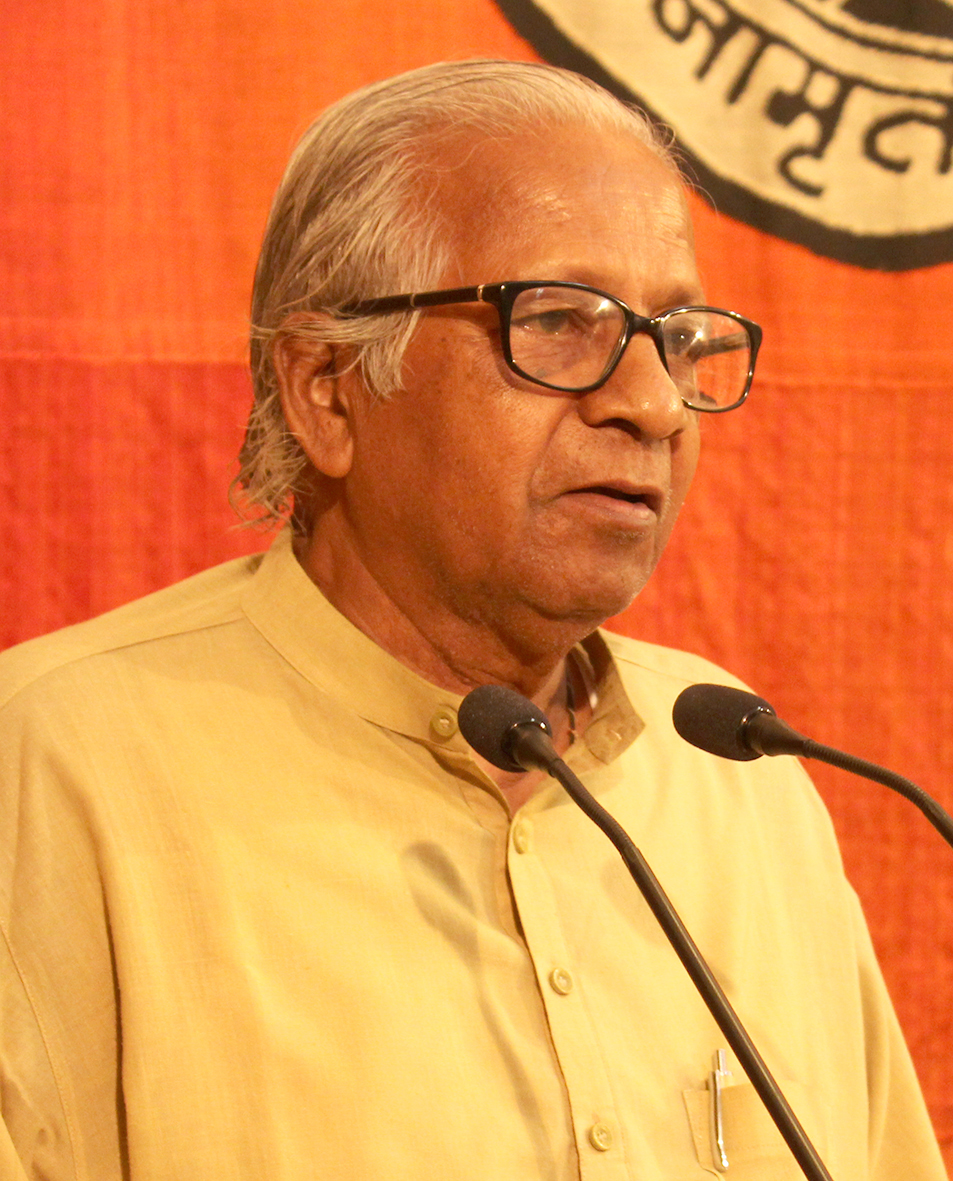
- Sheth in 2019
- Born: Chandrakant Trikamlal Sheth; 3 February 1938; Kalol, Panchmahal district, Bombay Province, British India
- Died: 2 August 2024 (aged 86); Ahmedabad, Gujarat, India
- Education: Ph.D
- Alma mater: Gujarat University; Gujarat Vidyapith
- Occupations: Poet; essayist; critic; editor
- Writing career
- Pen name: Aryaputra, Nand Samavedi, Baalchandra, Daksh Prajapati
- Language: Gujarati
- Notable work: Dhoolmani Paglio (1984)
- Notable awards: Kumar Chandrak (1964); Narmad Suvarna Chandrak (1964); Ranjitram Suvarna Chandrak (1985); Uma-Snehrashmi Prize (1984–85); Sahitya Akademi Award (1986); Dhanji Kanji Gandhi Suvarna Chandrak (1986); Narsinh Mehta Award (2005); Sahitya Gaurav Puraskar (2006)

Signature
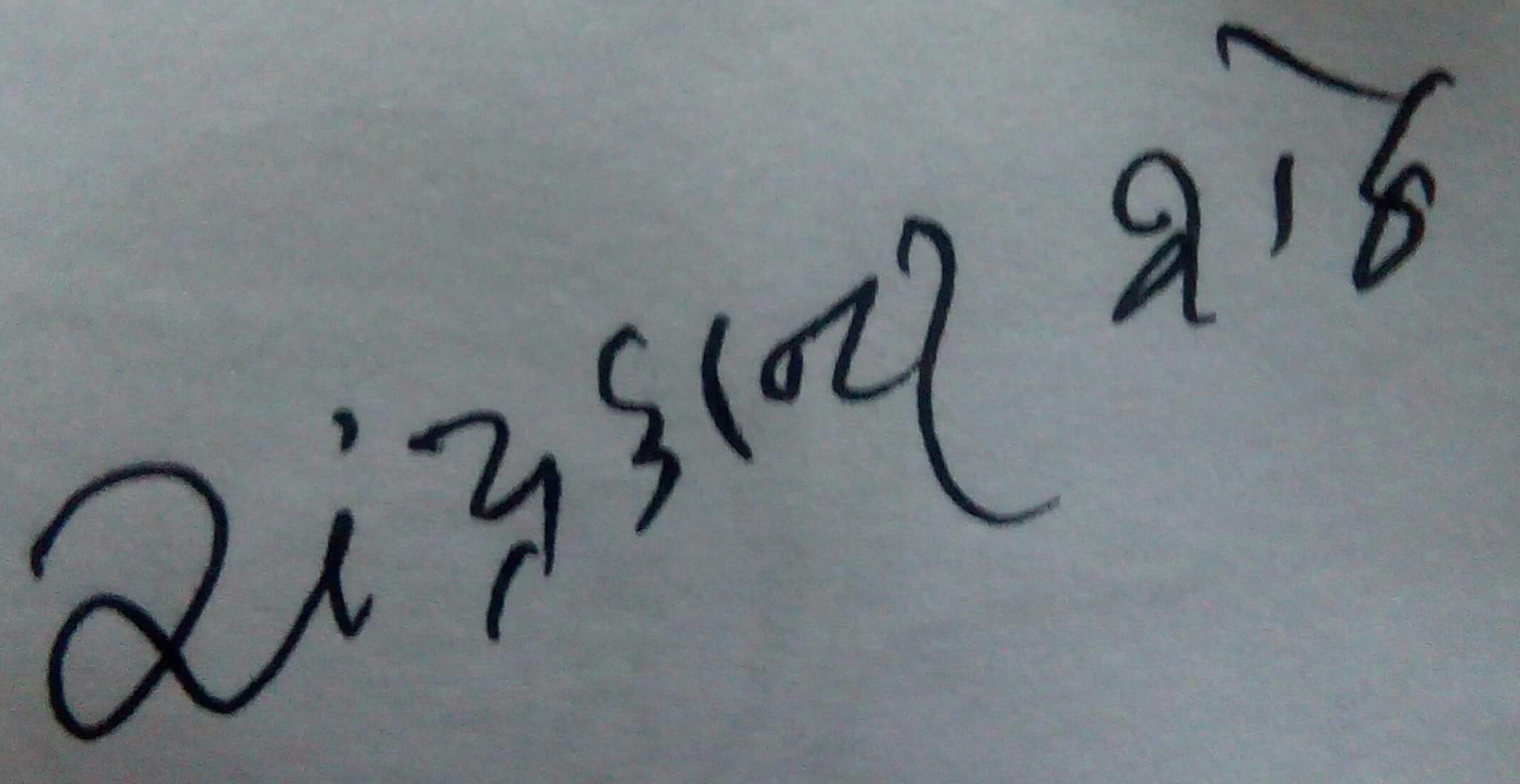

Chandrakant Sheth (3 February 1938 – 2 August 2024) was an Indian Gujarati poet, essayist, critic, translator and editor from Gujarat. His pen names include Aryaputra, Nand Samavedi, Balchadra and Daksh Prajapati. He won the Sahitya Akademi Award for Gujarati in 1986 for his book Dhoolmani Paglio.

In January 2025, Sheth was honored with the Padma Shri, India's fourth-highest civilian award, by the Government of India.

== Biography ==
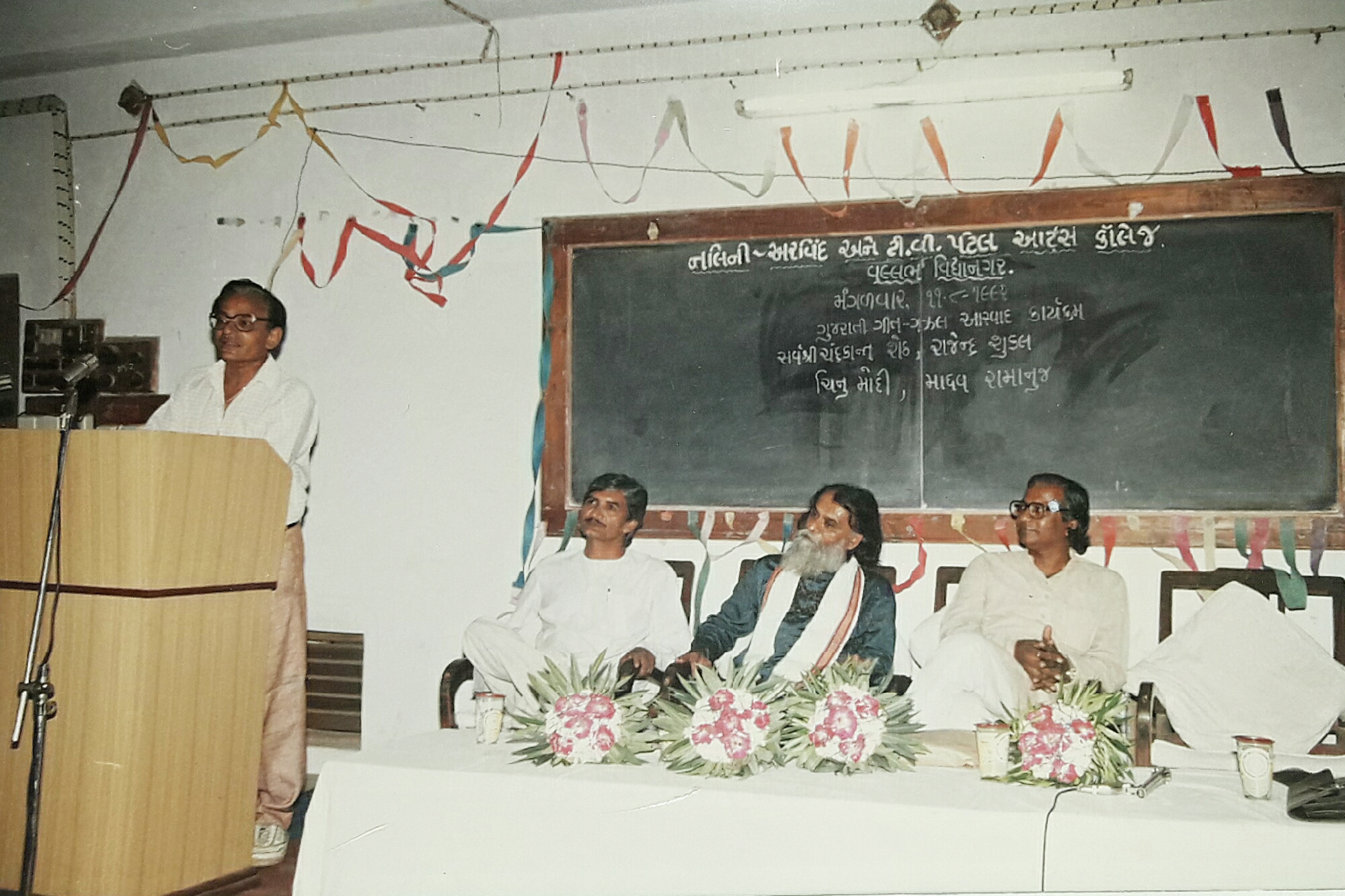
Chinu Modi on Mic, than Chandrakant Sheth, Rajendra Shukla and Madhav Ramanuj at Vallabh Vidyanagar, 1992

Sheth was born on 3 February 1938 in Kalol, a village in Panchmahal district to Trikamlal. His family is native to Thasra village of Kheda. He matriculated in 1954, completed BA in 1958, and MA in 1961 from Gujarat University with Gujarati and Sanskrit as his core subjects. He completed his Ph.D. in 1979 from Gujarat Vidyapith with a research thesis on Umashankar Joshi.

He served as a part-time lecturer at St. Xavier's College, Ahmedabad in 1961–62. He served as a professor at different colleges in Gujarat including Kapadvanj College (1962–63), Gujarat Vidyapith (1963–1966), Bhakta Vallabh Dhola College (1966–1972) and again Gujarat Vidyapith (1972–1979). From 1979 to 1984, he served as the manager of K. L. Swadhyay Mandir, run by Gujarati Sahitya Parishad, and also worked as a co-editor of Gujarati Sahityakosh. He again joined Gujarat Vidyapith and retired as the head of Gujarati Department. He served as an honorary at Gujarati Vishwkosh Trust, Ahmedabad.

Sheth died in Ahmedabad on 2 August 2024, at the age of 86.

== Works ==
Sheth published several poetry collections, Pavan Rooperi (1972) and Ughadati Diwalo (1974) are his early collections of poetry. Padagha ni Pele Par (1948) and Gagan Kholati Bari (1990) are his collections of songs, Ek Tahuko Pandma (1986) is collection of ghazals while Chandaliya ni Gadi (1980) and Hu To Chalu Mari Jem! (2001) are his collections of children's poetry. His other collections are Shaksharata Geeto (1990), Shage Ek Zalhalie (1999), Undanmathi Ave, Unchanma Lai Jay (2004) and Jal Vadal Ane Veej (2005). Ramesh M. Trivedi has edited selected poems as Chandrakant Sheth na Kavyo (2001).

Sheth was a prolific essayist. His Nand Samvedi (1980, 2001) is a collection of modernist essays; Chehra Bhitar Chehra (1986) is a collection of 21 biographical essays; Het ane Halvash (1980) and Vahal ane Vinod (1995) have 33 and 24 essays respectively with light humour; Vaninu Sat, Vanini Shakti (1997) is a collection of short essays on words of Veda and Upnishad while Gun ane Garima (1997) is a collection of 31 essays. Labhshankar Thakar edited and published selected essays as Aa-nand Parva (2002). His other collections of humorous essays are Halavi Kalamna Ful (2005) and Chandrakant Shethni Pratinidhi Hasyarachnao (2007).

Dhoolmani Pagalio (1984) is his autobiographical work about his childhood; Dharatina Chand, Dharatina Sooraj (1996,1997) is a collection of biographical essays; America Bhas Abhas (2001) is a travelogue; Swapnapinjar (1983) is a collection of one-act plays; E Balconyvali Chhokari Ane... (1995) is a collection of stories while E Ane Hu (1991) is a humour story.

His works of criticism include Kavyapratyaksh (1976), Arthantar (1978), Ramnarayan V. Pathak (1979), Irony nu Swarup ane Sahityama Teno Viniyog (1984), Kavitani Trijyama (1986), Kant (1990), Sahitya: Pran ane Pravartan (1998), Swami Anand (1998) and Shabda Deshno, Shabda Videshno (2002). His other works are Swaminarayan Santkavita: Aswad ane Avbodh (1984), Gujaratima Viramchihno (with Mohanbhai Patel, 1973), Mahadev Desai: Satva ane Sadhana (1994), Gujarati Gamnam-suchi (1996), Umashankar Joshi: Zalak ane Zankhi (2003), Umashankar no Vagvaibhav (2008) and Sahitya- Prabhav ane Prati-bhav (2006).

Sheth translated and adapted many works which include Pandit Bhatkhande (1967), Malayalam Sahityani Rooprekha (1978), Athamni Rat (1994), Anu Naam Zindagi (1995) and Lakhmi (1995). He edited Brihad Gujarati Kavya Parichay Part I and II (1973, 1995), Brihad Gujarati Gadya Parichay Part I and II (1973, 1995) and Bhasha Sahitya Dwara Rashtriy Ekta (1977) with Mohanbhai Patel. He also edited Priyakant Maniar na Kavyo (1998), Chunteli Kavita: Sundaram (2000), Manhariyat (2000) and Amargeeto (2000). He edited, with others, Dampatyamangal (1979), Matrudarshan (1981), Pushtidarshan (1986), Hemchandracharya (1989), Yugdrashta Umashankar Joshi (1995), Adhit: Pramukhiy Pravachano (1997), Pratyayan: Swatantrya Suvarna Jayanti Visheshank (1998), Gurjar Adyatan Kavya Sanchay (1998), Gurjar Pranay Kavya Sanchay (1998), Gurjar Geet Sanchay (1998), Gurjar Gazal Sangrah (1998) and Gurjar Kavya Vaibhav (2005). Sankhya Nirdeshak Shabda Sangnyao (1983) is also his work.

== Recognition ==
Sheth won Kumar Chandrak in 1964, Narmad Suvarna Chandrak in 1964, Ranjitram Suvarna Chandrak in 1985, Narsinh Mehta Award in 2005 and Sahitya Gaurav Puraskar in 2006. His book Dhoolmani Paglio (1984) was awarded the Uma-Snehrashmi Prize (1984–85) and Sahitya Akademi Award (1986). In 1986, he received Dhanji Kanji Gandhi Suvarna Chandrak which he shared with Rajendra Shah, a Gujarati poet. He has also received the Chandrashekhar Thakkur Prize (1973), Ramprasad Bakshi Prize (1998), Anantrai Raval Vivechan Award (2000) and Natwarlal Malvi Prize (2001). In 2018, the Sahitya Akademi awarded him Bal Sahitya Puraskar for his contribution in Gujarati children's literature.

== See also ==
- List of Gujarati-language writers
