= Vinod Joshi =

Gujarati poet and writer from India (Born: 1955)

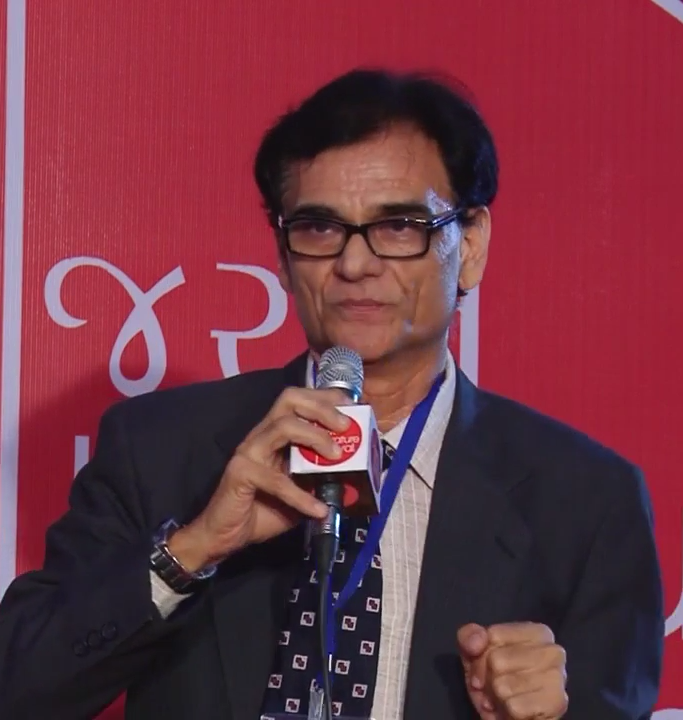
- Joshi at Gujarat Literature Festival Ahmedabad; 2016
- Born: 13 August 1955 (age 71); Bhoringda, Bombay State, India
- Education: M.A., Ph.D.
- Occupations: Professor, poet, writer, literary critic
- Spouse: Vimal Joshi (m. 1981)
- Writing career
- Language: Gujarati
- Period: Post-modern Gujarati literature
- Notable awards: Kavishwar Dalpatram Award (2013); Sahitya Gaurav Puraskar (2015); Narsinh Mehta Award (2018); Kalapi Award (2018); Narmad Suvarna Chandrak (2022); Sahitya Akademi Award (2023)

Academic work
- Doctoral students: Mahendrasinh Parmar

Vinod Joshi's voice
poem Sakhi Maro Saybo Suto Faliye recited at GLF 2016

Vinod Joshi (born 13 August 1955) is an Indian poet, writer and literary critic in Gujarati language from Gujarat, India. His notable works include Parantu, a collection of Geet (lyric poetry), Shikhandi, a long narrative poem based on Shikhandi, a character from the Mahābhārata, Radio Natak: Swarup ane Siddhant (Radio Drama: Form and Theory, an abridged Ph.D. thesis), Tundil-tundika, a form of padyavarta, a Gujarati medieval literary genre, and Zalar Vage Zoothadi, a collection of poems. He is the recipient of the Jayant Pathak Puraskar (1985), Critic's award (1986), Kavishwar Dalpatram Award (2013), Sahitya Gaurav Puraskar (2015), Narsinh Mehta Award (2018), Kalapi Award (2018), Darshak Sahitya Sanman Award (2021), Narmad Suvarna Chandrak (2022) and Sahitya Akademi Award (2023).

== Early life ==
Vinod Joshi was born on 13 August 1955 in Bhoringda, a village of Amreli district of Gujarat state. His family is a native of Botad. His father, Hargovinddas Joshi, was a Sanskrit scholar, and served as a Panchayat Mantri in rural Saurashtra. Joshi has been influenced by the folkloric Gujarati language of his mother, Lilavati Joshi.

Joshi completed his preschool education at Mohanlal Motichand Balmandir, Gadhada. He completed his primary education at the Government School of Turkha, a village in Botad district, from 1960 to 1966. He received secondary schooling from the N.T.M Government High School, Surendranagar (1967–1968); Sarvoday Vidyalaya, Lathidad (1969), and from the Government High School, Botad (1970).

Joshi earned his Bachelor of Arts degree in Gujarati literature at the Kavishri Botadkar Arts and Commerce College, Botad, in 1975. He completed his Master of Arts at the Gujarati Anusnatak Kendra (Gujarati Postgraduate Centre) at Saurashtra University, Bhavnagar (1976), and the Gujarati Bhasha Sahitya Bhavan (Gujarati Language and Literature Department) at Saurashtra University (1977). He earned a Ph.D. in 1980 from the Gujarati Bhasha Sahitya Bhavan, Saurashtra University, for his research thesis Radio Nataknu Kalaswaroop Ane Gujaratima Teno Vikas (The Art of Radio Drama and its Development in the Gujarati Language) under the supervision of Ishwarlal R. Dave.

He is married to Vimal Joshi, and they have a son, Aditya.

== Career ==
Vinod Joshi began his career as a Professor of Gujarati literature in 1977 at the H.L. Patel Arts and Commerce College in Bhayavadar, a town near Upleta. From 1978 to 1987, he was a professor at the Kapadia Mahila Arts College, Bhavnagar. He served as a professor and Head of the Gujarati Department at Maharaja Krishnakumarsinhji Bhavnagar University from 1988 to 2017. He has also served as Dean of the Faculty of Arts and Vice-Chancellor of the same university. He was convener of Gujarati language at Sahitya Akademi, New Delhi from 2008 to 2012, and has again been appointed convener at the same national institution for 2018 to 2022.

Joshi started writing poetry during his school days. In Standard 10, he explored the Sanskrit metres and ventured into the metrical form. His poetry was first published in 1973 in Kumar, a Gujarati language magazine. His poems have subsequently been published in other Gujarati periodicals, including Kavilok, Kavita, Shabdasrishti, Parab, Navneet Samarpan, Buddhiprakash, and Etad.

== Works ==
Vinod Joshi's poetry is infused with images of rural life, mainly through the portrayal of feminine sentiments in Gujarati literature.

=== Poetry ===
Joshi is critically acclaimed in Gujarati literature for the elegant female sensibility in the sounds, rhymes and rhythms of his Geets (songs). Motifs in his poetry include intense femininity, solitude, social status, and an indefinable individuality, conveyed in images of everyday reality and objects.

Parantu, his first anthology of poems, was published in 1984 by the Kavilok Trust. It has been considered to be significant contribution to the Modern Gujarati poetry. The critic Ramanlal Joshi notes the collection for its "artistic use of the subtleties of language to achieve poetry". Parantu was followed in 1985 by Shikhandi. A long narrative poem, Shikhandi is composed in accordance with the rules of Sanskrit prosody. The poem deals with the psyche of Shikhandi and Bhishma, characters from the Mahabharata.

Tundil-tundika (1987), another long narrative poem, is a reinterpretation of the medieval Gujarati padyavaarta form in a modern context. Zalar Vage Zoothadi (1991) is Joshi's critically acclaimed collection of poems.

In 2018, he published Sairandhri, a metrical poem composed in prabandha form with seven cantos, 49 chapters and 1800 lines. It is based on Draupadi, one of the characters of Hindu epic Mahabharata, and depicts a distinct world of Draupadi's thoughts and feelings as a woman during her exiles, using various meters like Chopai and Dohra. Critic Radheshyam Sharma notes the poem for its musicality, figurative language and its depiction of Sringara (the romantic sentiments).

Vinod Joshi's selected poems have been compiled as Kunchi Aapo, Baaijee! by Manilal H. Patel.

=== Criticism ===
- Sonnet (1984)
- Abhipret (1986)
- Amrut Ghayal: Vyaktimatta ane Vangmay (1988) (literary criticism of the work of Amrut Ghayal)
- Udgreev (1995)
- Nivesh (1995)
- Radio Natak: Swaroop ane Siddhant (1986; Radio Drama: Form and Theory, an abridged Ph.D. thesis)
- Vishad (2018)
- Nirvivaad (2018)
- Kavyapat (2018)
- Kavyatat (2018)
- Kavyarat (2018)

=== Compilations ===
- Neeraksheer (1984 to 2012)
- Sahityano Aaswad (1992)
- Raasatarangini (Poems of Botadkar),(1995)
- Kismat Kureshi Ni 50 Ghazal (1999)
- Kavyachayan (2006)
- Aaj Andhar Khushbo bharyo Lagto (Poems of Prahlaad Parekh), (2002)
- Vijayray Vaidya Smarak Grantha
- Viraatna Pagthaare (Poems of Jagdeep Veerani), (2016)
- Aahuti (regarding Morari Bapu) (2017)
- Jagdeep Veerani Ni Kavyasrishti (2019)

=== Fiction ===
- Morpichchha (1999) - An epistolary novel
- Hava Ni Haveli (2018) (short stories)
- Hathelima Hastakshar (2018) (short stories)
- Sagapan Na Sarvala (2018) (short stories)
- Moti Savva Lakh Na (2018) (short stories)
- Ajwala Ni Aarati (2018) (short stories)
- Khobama Jeevatar (2018) (short stories)

== Recognition ==
Vinod Joshi was awarded the Kavishwar Dalpatram Award in 2013, and was awarded the Sahitya Gaurav Puraskar by the Gujarat Sahitya Akademi in 2015. His book of literary criticism, Nivesh, won the Ramanlal Joshi Prize, instituted by the Gujarati Sahitya Parishad (Gujarati Literary Council), in 1994. In 2012, he was the first recipient of the Girnar Sahitya Shiromani Puraskar, awarded by the Indian public service broadcaster Doordarshan in Ahmedabad. He has also received the Umashankar Joshi Award (1986), the Jayant Pathak Poetry Award (1984), the Critics Award (1986), the Zaverchand Meghani Award (2011), the Rashtriya Kalakendra Appreciation Award (2014), and the Kala Ratna Award from the Gujarat Kala Pratishthan (2016). He was awarded the Narsinh Mehta Award in 2018 for his contribution to Gujarati poetry. He was awarded the Samarpan Sanman (2018) by the Bharatiya Vidya Bhavan Educational Trust for his Prabandh-Kavya Sairandhree, and the Kalapi Award (2018) by the Indian National Theatre (INT) for his contribution to Gujarati poetry. He is also awarded by the Gujarat Sahitya Academy for Sairandhri and Nirvivaad for the best books of poetry and criticism of 2018. He is felicitated with Manubhai Pancholi 'Darshak' Sahitya Samman-2021. In 2022, he was awarded Narmad Suvarna Chandrak for Sairandhri. He received the 2023 Sahitya Akademi Award for the same book.

== See also ==
- List of Gujarati-language writers

Awards
Preceded by Gulam Mohammed Sheikh	Recipient of the Sahitya Akademi Award winners for Gujarati; 2023	Succeeded by Dileep Jhaveri
