= Bhanuprasad =

Bhanuprasad is a masculine given name. Notable people with the name include:

- Bhanuprasad Pandya (1932–2022), Indian Gujarati-language poet
- Bhanuprasad Trivedi, Indian Gujarati-language poet
