= Jayendra Shekhadiwala =

Indian Gujarati-language poet, critic and professor (Born: 1952)

Jayendra Manilal Patel Jayendra Shekhadiwala
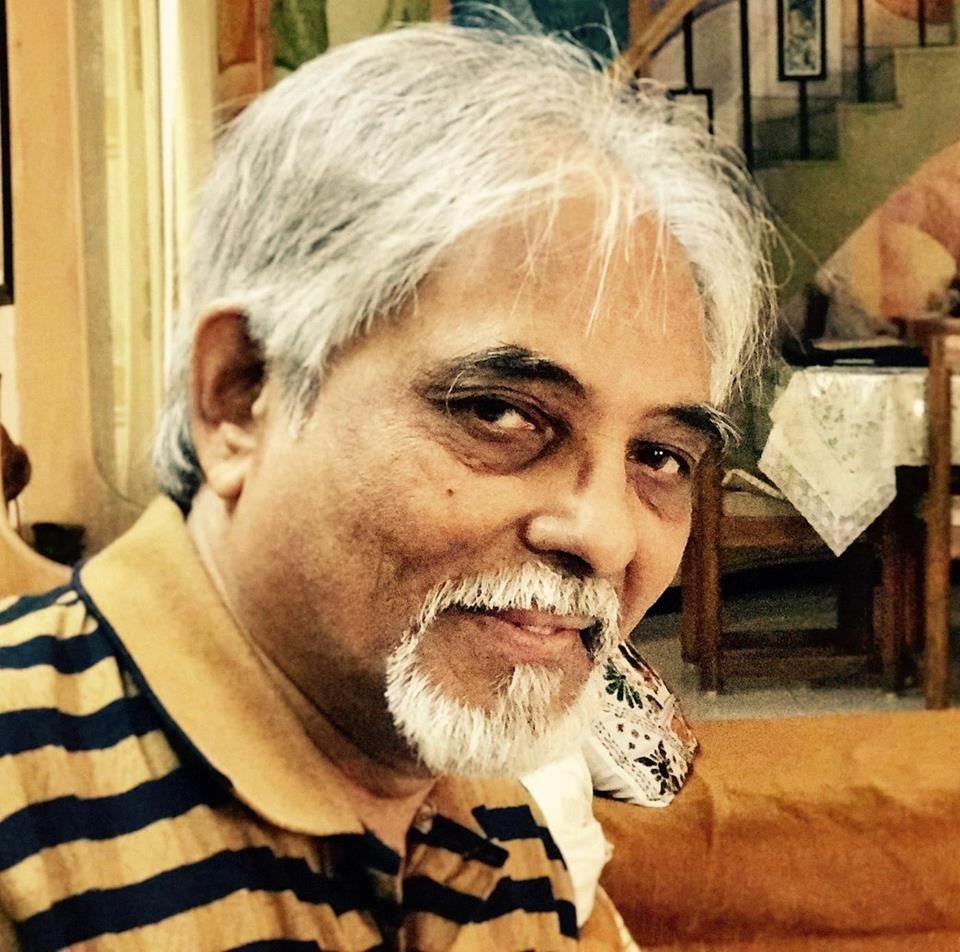
- Jayendra in December 2016
- Born: Jayendra Manilal Patel; 23 August 1952 (age 74); Shekhadi, a village in Petlad, Anand district, Gujarat
- Education: Master of Arts; Bachelor of Law; Ph.D
- Occupations: poet, critic, professor
- Writing career
- Pen name: Jayendra Shekhadiwala
- Language: Gujarati
- Notable work: Kalki
- Notable awards: Kavishwar Dalpatram Award (2017)

Academic background
- Thesis: Ravji Patel Ek Adhyayan (1990)
- Doctoral advisor: Pramodkumar Patel

Jayendra Manilal Patel, better known by his pen name Jayendra Shekhadiwala (Gujarati: જયેન્દ્ર શેખડીવાળા), is a Gujarati poet, critic and professor from Gujarat, India. He received Kavishwar Dalpatram Award (2017) for his contribution in Gujarati poetry.

== Life ==
Jayendra Shekhadiwala was born on 23 August 1952 at Shekhadi, a village in Petlad of Anand district. He holds BA, MA, LLB degree. He received Ph.D for his research Ravji Patel Ek Adhyayan (research work on the life and works of poet Ravji Patel). He served as professor at Sardar Patel University and retired from there.

He married Kapila Patel and they have a son.

== Works ==
Kalki, Kivanditi and Kardampalli are his poetry collection. Natyanjali is a play while Nakhshikh (with Harish Meenashru), Prerana and Shramik Soor are the compilation done by him. Katheti and Angagatchhavi are his research works.

After retirement, Jayendra is actively involved in painting and has held both one-man show and group exhibitions.

== Recognition ==
His book Kalki received prizes from Gujarati Sahitya Parishad and Gujarat Sahitya Akademi. In 2017, he received Kavishwar Dalpatram Award. He is also recipient of Umashankar Joshi Gold Medal and Gujarati Sahitya Academi' Award.

== See also ==
- List of Gujarati-language writers
