= Madhav Ramanuj =

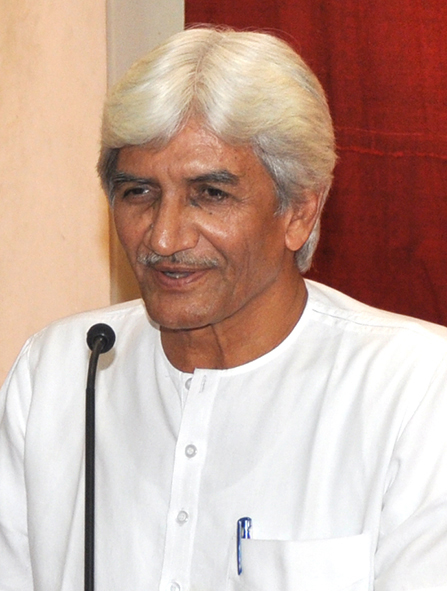
- Madhav Ramanuj at Gujarati Vishwakosh Trust, April 2015
- Born: Madhav Odhavdas Ramanuj; 22 April 1945 (age 81); Pachchham, Bombay Presidency, British India
- Education: Diploma of Arts
- Alma mater: Sheth C. N. College of Fine Arts
- Occupations: Poet, Writer
- Spouse: Lalita
- Children: Deepti, Neha
- Writing career
- Language: Gujarati
- Period: Modern Gujarati literature
- Notable works: Tame (1972); Anahadnu Ekant (2013); Suryapurush (1997, 1999)
- Notable awards: Narsinh Mehta Award (2012); Sahitya Gaurav Puraskar (2016)
- Website: Official website

Madhav Odhavdas Ramanuj (born 22 April 1945) is an Indian Gujarati-language poet and writer from Gujarat, India. Tame (1972) and Anahadnu Ekant (2013) are his collections of poems. He received the Narsinh Mehta Award (2012) and Sahitya Gaurav Puraskar (2016) for his contribution in Gujarati literature.

== Early life ==
Ramanuj was born in Pachchham, a village in Ahmedabad district of the Indian state of Gujarat. His father was Odhavdas Ramanuj. He completed the Diploma of Arts in Applied Arts from Sheth C. N. College of Fine Arts in 1973. He joined the same college as professor of Applied Arts in 1973, and retired as the principal of the same college. He became an editor of Akhand Anand in 1969. He worked with publication house, Vora and Co. in 1969-70. He designed books covers for R. R. Sheth & Co. from 1970 to 1973.

He served as the president of Gandharv Sangeet Vidyalaya Trust, Ahmedabad and Gujarati Sahitya Parishad. He was an adviser of Doordarshan, Ahmedabad. He worked as head of the Human Resource Department of Institute Kidney Diseases and Research Centre (IKDRC) at Ahmedabad. He set up the 'Kidney Theatre' group at IKDRC, which organises plays for awareness on kidney related ailments.

== Works ==
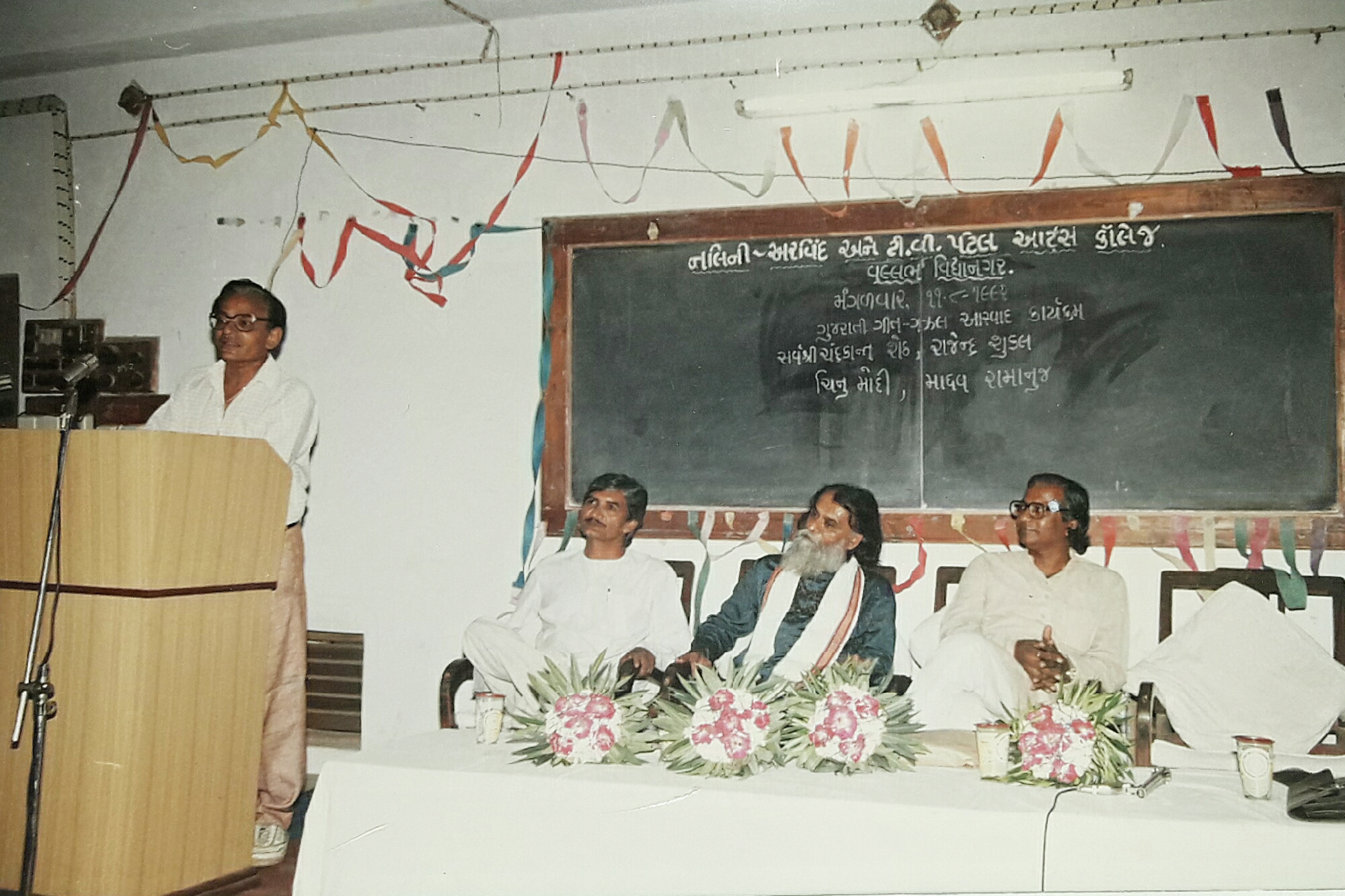
Chinu Modi on mic, than Chandrakant Sheth, Rajendra Shukla and Madhav Ramanuj at Vallabh Vidyanagar, 1992

Tame (You; 1972), Aksharnu Ekant (1997) and Anahadnu Ekant (2013) are his collections of poems. Pinjarni Aarpar (1990) is his biographical novel about Reuben David, who was the founder of the Ahmedabad Zoo. Suryapurush (1997, 1999) is his two parts biographical novel about Chimanbhai Patel, the former Chief Minister of Gujarat.

He wrote lyrics for songs of Gujarati films. He won state prizes for Pithi Pili Ne Rang Rato (1974) and Derani Jethani (1999).

His plays include Rag-Vairag (2000) and Akshar nu Amrut.

== Recognition ==
He received the Narsinh Mehta Award in 2012 and the Sahitya Gaurav Puraskar award. Ramanuj was honored with the Lifetime Achievement Award At the Ahmedabad International Film Festival, presented by Omguru.

== Personal life ==
Ramanuj married Lalita and they have a daughter, Deepti. His younger daughter Neha died on 5 October 2009.

== See also ==
- List of Gujarati-language writers
