= Sahitya Gaurav Puraskar =

Sahitya Gaurav Award
- Civilian award for contributions to Literature
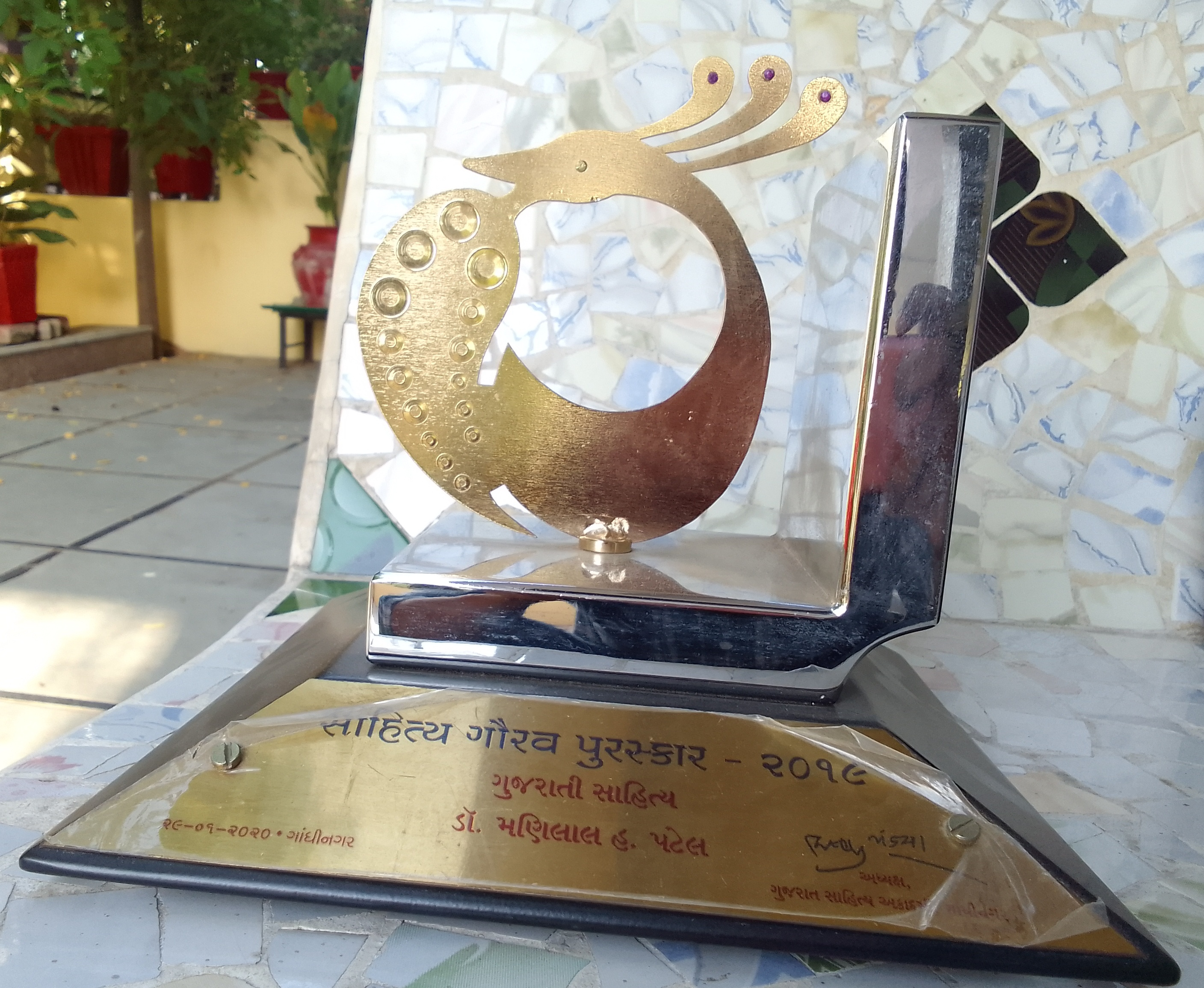
- Award plaque
- Awarded for: Literary honour
- Sponsored by: Gujarat Sahitya Akademi
- Location: Gujarat, India
- Reward: ₹100,000
- First award: 1983
- Final award: 2021

Highlights
- Total awarded: 38
- First winner: Vishnuprasad Trivedi
- Last winner: Madhu Rye

The Sahitya Gaurav Puraskar (Gujarati: સાહિત્ય ગૌરવ પુરસ્કાર), also known as Sahitya Gaurav Award, is a literary honour in Gujarat, India. The award is conferred by Gujarat Sahitya Akademi and the Government of Gujarat to the Gujarati authors for their significant contribution in Gujarati literature. Established in 1983, the award comprises a plaque, shawl and a cash prize of ₹100,000. In 1985, Umashankar Joshi rejected the Sahitya Gaurav Award.

== Recipients ==
Following is the list of recipients:

Year	Recipients
1983	Vishnuprasad Trivedi
1984	Sundaram
1985	Umashankar Joshi (not accepted)
1986	Pannalal Patel
1987	Snehrashmi
1988	Chandravadan Mehta
1989	Harivallabh Bhayani
1990	not awarded
1991	Nagindas Parekh
1992	Rajendra Shah
1993	Niranjan Bhagat
1994	Gulabdas Broker
1995	Hiraben Pathak
1996	Keshavram Kashiram Shastri
1997	Makarand Dave
1998	Dhirubhai Thaker
1999	Manubhai Pancholi 'Darshak'
2000	Ushanas
2001	Ramanlal Joshi Raghuvir Chaudhari
2002	Labhshankar Thakar Dhiruben Patel
2003	Madhusudan Parekh
2004	Bholabhai Patel
2005	Vinod Bhatt
2006	Chandrakant Sheth
2007	Amritlal Vegad
2008	Varsha Adalja
2009	Kumarpal Desai
2010	Vinesh Antani
2011	Taarak Mehta
2012	Bhagvatikumar Sharma
2013	Sitanshu Yashaschandra
2014	Suman Shah
2015	Vinod Joshi
2016	Madhav Ramanuj
2017	Dinkar Joshi
2018	Mohammad Mankad
2019	Manilal H. Patel
2020	Madhu Rye
2021	Mohan Parmar
