= Nalin Raval =

Indian poet and writer (1933–2021)

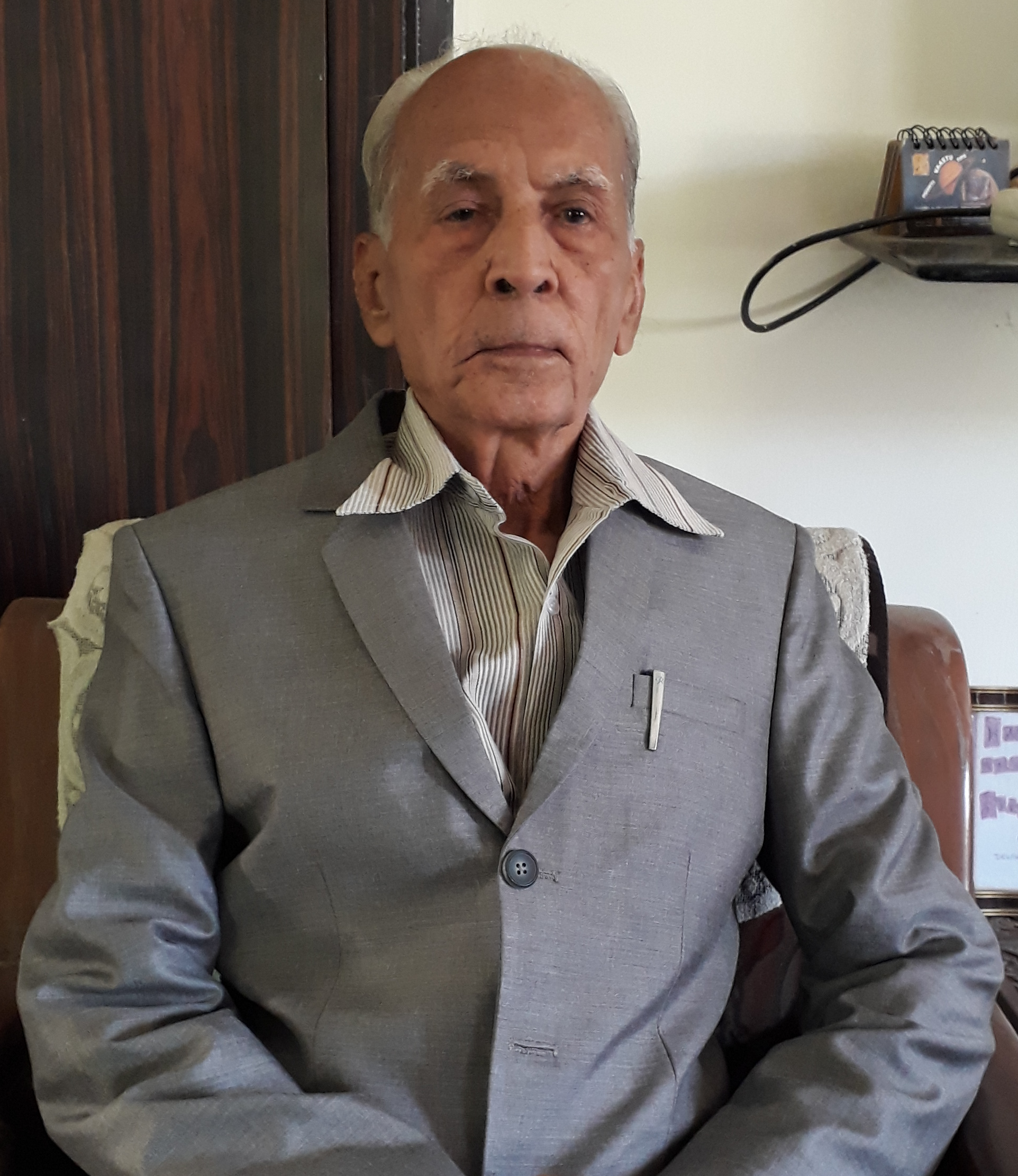
- Nalin Raval at his home in Ahmedabad, March 2018
- Born: 17 March 1933; Ahmedabad, Gujarat, India
- Died: 5 April 2021 (aged 88)
- Education: B.A., M.A.
- Occupations: Poet, short story writer
- Spouse: Kumud (m. 1963)
- Writing career
- Language: Gujarati
- Notable awards: Kavishwar Dalpatram Award (2010); Narsinh Mehta Award (2013); Ranjitram Suvarna Chandrak (2013)

Nalin Chandrakant Raval (17 March 1933 – 5 April 2021) was a Gujarati poet and short story writer from India. Born in Ahmedabad and educated in languages, he taught in colleges. He published five poetry collections along with short stories. He received several awards including Ranjitram Suvarna Chandrak.

== Life ==
Nalin Raval was born on 17 March 1933 at Ahmedabad. He was native of Wadhwan. He completed his primary education from Kalupur School No. 7 and secondary education from New Education High school. He completed his matriculation in 1954. He completed B.A. in Gujarati and English in 1956 and M.A. in 1959. In 1953, his first poem was published in Kumar magazine. He briefly taught in Bharuch and Nadiad before joining B. D. Arts College at Ahmedabad as a professor of English. He retired in 1993.

He married Kumud in 1963. He had three sons Kartik, Ashutosh, Biren and a daughter Rajul. Raval died on 5 April 2021.

== Works ==
He had published five poetry collections. Udagar (Utterance, 1962) is a collection of twenty one poems. Avkash (1972), Laylin (1996) and Aahlaad (2008) are his other poetry collections.

Swapnalok (1977) is a collection of sixteen short stories.

Paschatya Kavita (1973) is a work of criticism on Western poetry. Kavitanu Swarup (2001) is critical survey of other poets and their works. Anubhav (1975) is essays on his relation with poetry. He edited Priyakant Maniyar, an introduction of his author friend, Priyakant Maniyar.

He translated Sindhi Sahityana Itihasni Rooprekha (Timeline of History of Sindhi Literature, 1977).

== Awards ==
He was awarded Kavishwar Dalpatram Award in 2010 and Narsinh Mehta Award in 2013. He was also awarded Ranjitram Suvarna Chandrak for 2013.
