= Narsinh Mehta Award =

- Civilian award for contributions to Literature
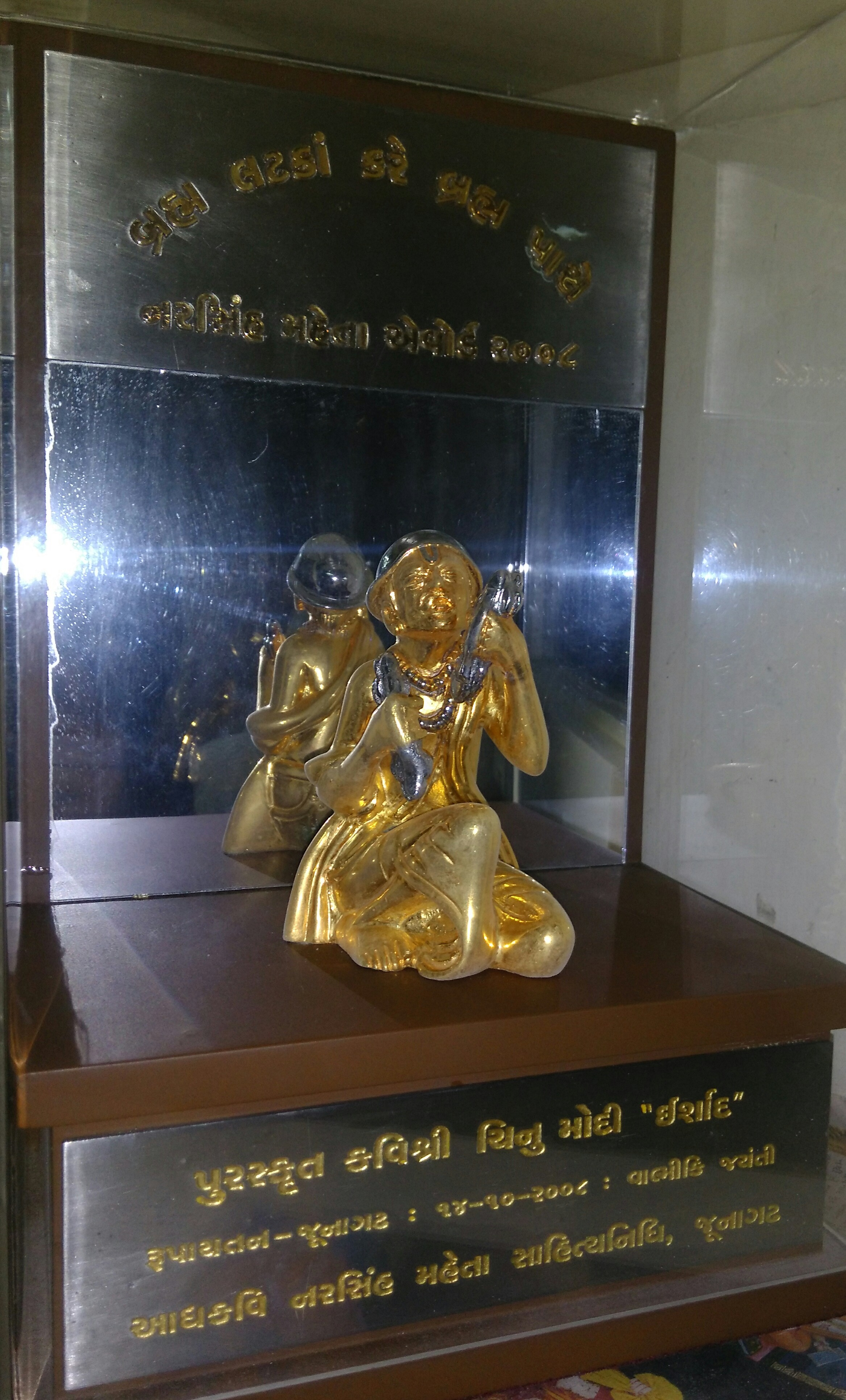
- The idol of Narsinh Mehta presented as an award
- Awarded for: Presented for the contribution in Gujarati literature
- Sponsored by: Narsinh Mehta Shahitya Nidhi Trust
- Reward: ₹1,51,000
- First award: 1999
- Final award: 2019

Highlights
- Total awarded: 26
- First winner: Rajendra Shah
- Last winner: Kamal Vora

Narsinh Mehta Award (Gujarati: નરસિંહ મહેતા પુરસ્કાર) is one of the highest awards of Gujarati literature. The award is conferred upon Gujarati language author by Adyakavi Narsinh Mehta Sahitya Nidhi, Junagadh, Gujarat. The award is held at corpuscle of Sharad Purnima, mostly at Rupayatan, Junagadh. The award was instituted in 1999. The recipient is presented the idol of Narsinh Mehta and ₹1,51,000.

The award of 2013 was conferred upon Nalin Raval and Harikrushna Pathak on 18 October 2013 at Rupayatan.

The new award of 2025 was conferred upon Harsh Brahmabhatt 9 September 2025.

== Recipients ==
Year	Recipients
1999	Rajendra Shah
2000	Makarand Dave
2001	Niranjan Bhagat
2002	Amrut Ghayal
2003	Jayant Pathak
2004	Ramesh Parekh
2005	Chandrakant Sheth
2006	Rajendra Shukla
2007	Suresh Dalal
2008	Chinu Modi
2009	Bhagwatikumar Sharma
2010	Anil Joshi
2011	Bhanuprasad Pandya
2012	Madhav Ramanuj
2013	Nalin Raval and Harikrishna Pathak
2014	Harish Meenashru
2015	Manohar Trivedi
2016	Jalan Matari
2017	Dalpat Padhiyar & Gulam Mohammed Sheikh
2018	Vinod Joshi
2019	Khalil Dhantejvi
2020	Jawahar Bakshi
2021	Rajesh Vyas 'Miskin'
2022	Yagnesh Dave
2023	Udayan Thakker
2024	Kamal Vora
2025	Harsh Brahmabhatt

== See also ==
- Narsinh Mehta
- Gujarati literature
