= Kavishwar Dalpatram Award =

- Dalpatram Poetry Award
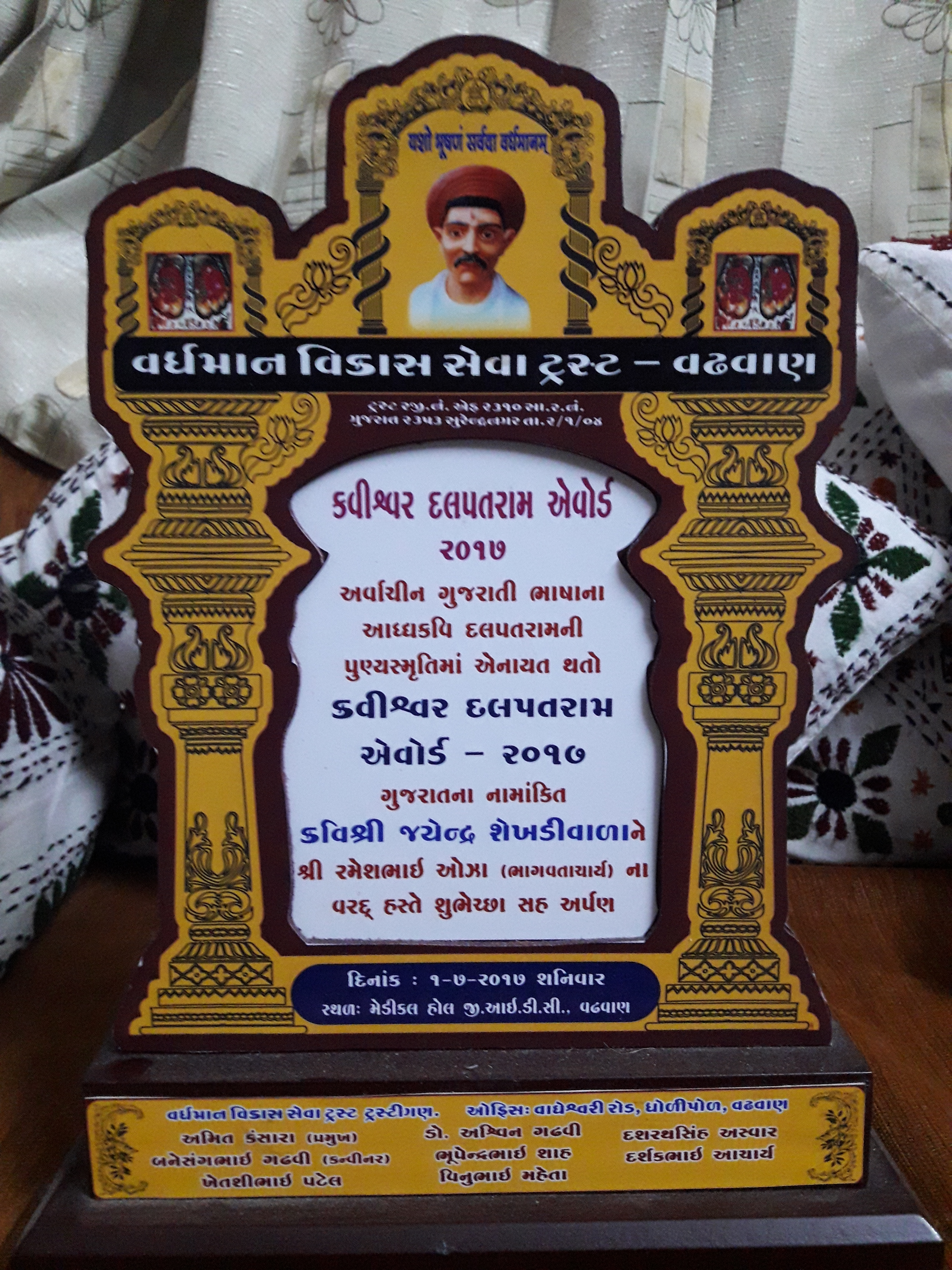
- Awarded for: literary honour in Gujarat, India
- Sponsored by: Vardhman Vikas Seva Trust
- Date: 2010
- Location: Wadhwan
- Country: India
- Presented by: Vardhman Vikas Seva Trust
- Reward: Rs. 25000
- First award: 2010
- Final award: 2020
- Currently held by: S. S. Rahi

The Kavishwar Dalpatram Award (Gujarati: કવિશ્વર દલપતરામ ઍવોર્ડ) is a literary honour in Gujarat, India given by Vardhman Vikas Seva Trust, Wadhwan. The award is conferred annually to the Gujarati language poet for their significant contribution to Gujarati poetry since 2010. Founded by the Vardhman Vikas Trust, the award is named after the renowned Gujarati poet Dalpatram. The award comprises a shield, a showl, and the cash prize of Rs. 25000.

== Recipients ==
The Kavishwar Dalpatram Award has been granted annually since 2010 to the following people:

Year	Recipient
2010	Nalin Raval
2011	Bhanuprasad Pandya
2012	Harikrishna Pathak
2013	Vinod Joshi
2014	Harshad Trivedi
2015	Ramesh Acharya
2016	Nayan Desai
2017	Jayendra Shekhadiwala
2018	Praful Pandya
2019	Jawahar Bakshi
2020	S. S. Rahi
