= Labhshankar Thakar =

Gujarati writer (1935-2016)

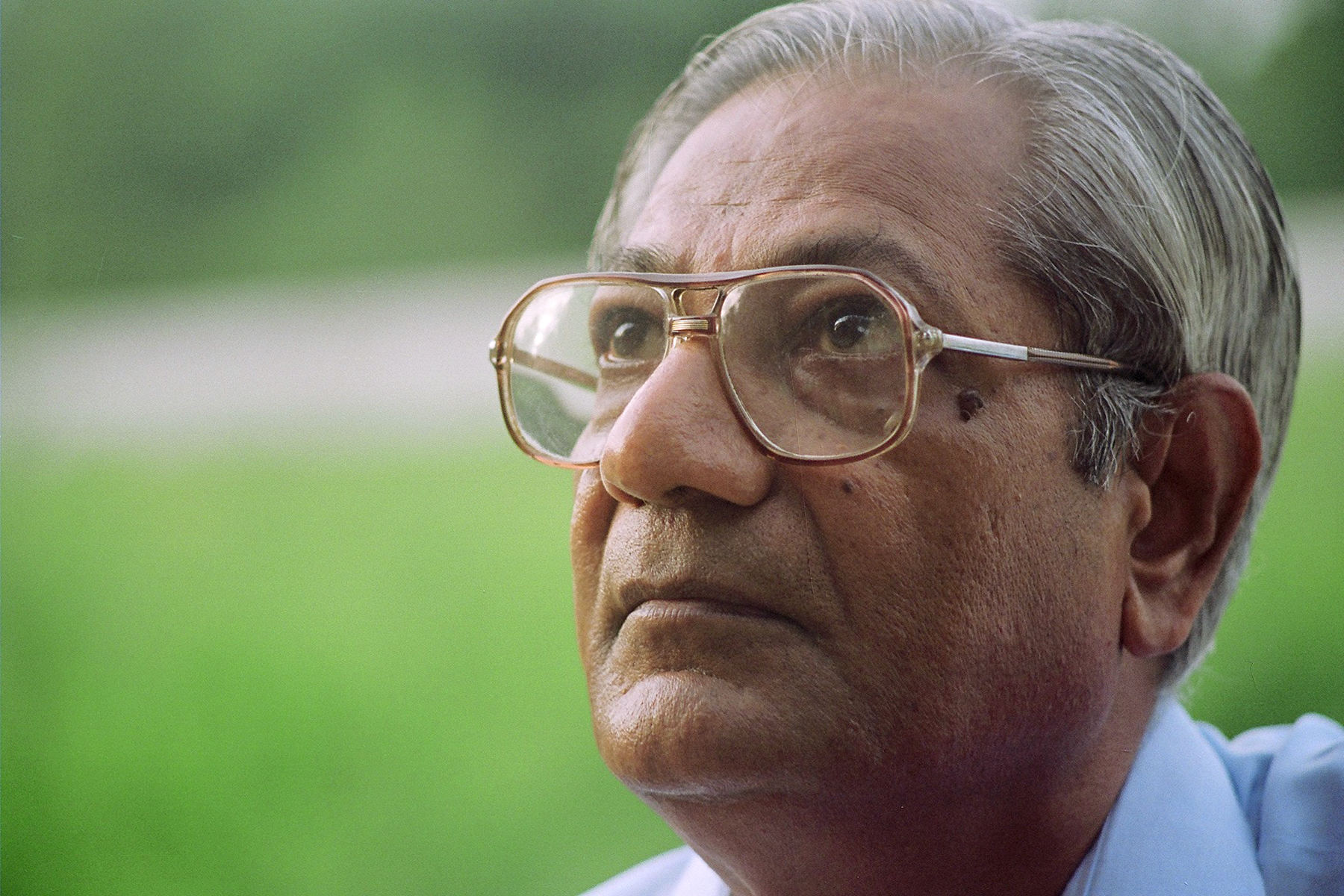
- Thakar at Ahmedabad, 1999
- Born: 14 January 1935; Sedla village near Surendranagar, Gujarat
- Died: 6 January 2016 (aged 80); Ahmedabad, Gujarat
- Education: Master of Arts
- Alma mater: Gujarat University
- Occupations: Poet, playwright, novelist, short story writer, journalist
- Writing career
- Pen name: Lagharo, Vaidya Punarvasu
- Language: Gujarati
- Period: Modern Gujarati literature
- Notable awards: Sahitya Akademi Award (1991); Ranjitram Suvarna Chandrak (1980); Sahitya Gaurav Puraskar (2002)

Labhshankar Jadavji Thakar, also known by his pen names Lagharo and Vaidya Punarvasu (14 January 1935 – 6 January 2016), was a Gujarati poet, playwright and story writer from India. Educated in languages and Ayurveda, he taught at colleges before starting practice of Ayurveda. He had a modernist approach in literature and was heavily influenced by absurd theatre and the traditions of experimental literature. He chiefly wrote plays and poetry.

== Life ==
Thakar was born on 14 January 1935 in Sedla village near Surendranagar, Gujarat. He was a native of Patdi village of Surendranagar district. He completed Bachelor of Arts in Gujarati in 1957, Master of Arts in 1959 from Gujarat University. He taught at various colleges in Ahmedabad for seven years and simultaneously studied Ayurveda. He received Diploma in Suddha Ayurveda in 1964. Later he started an Ayurvedic clinic Kayachikitsa and continued his practice.

He died on 6 January 2016 at Ahmedabad after prolonged illness.

== Works ==
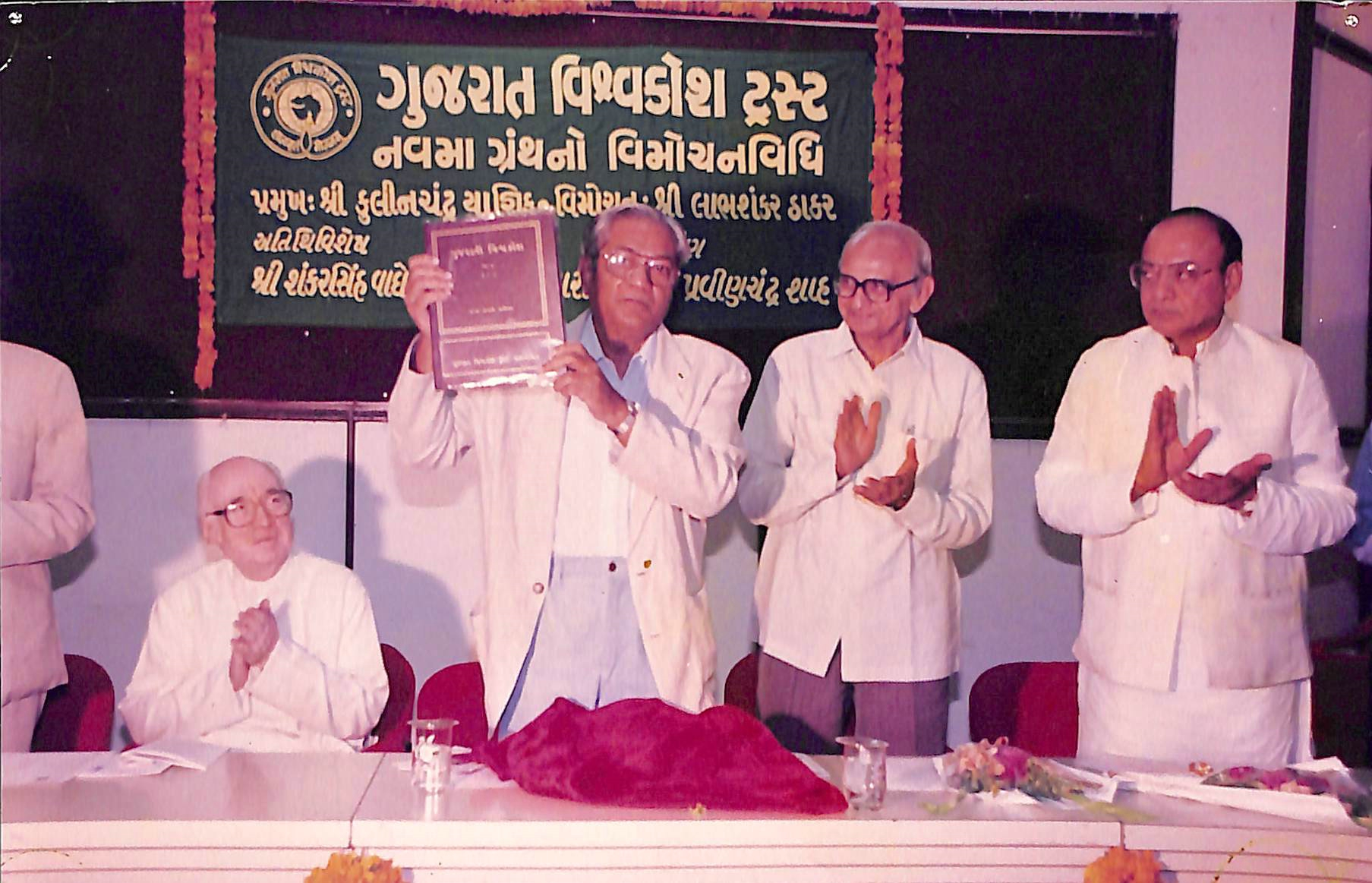
Thakar inaugurating the 9th volume of Gujarati Vishwakosh

Thakar was a modernist author of Gujarati literature. He, along with Madhu Rye, belongs to the Re School, a modernist tradition of Gujarati literature under the influence of existentialism challenging traditional literature styles.

He had written nearly 56 books of different genres as well as 21 books on Ayurvedic treatments.

=== Poetry ===
Thakar initially wrote poetry in traditional metres and gradually shifted to more experimental one. He emphasized the process of poetry rather than final piece of poetry. He was more interested in the absurdism than the realism.

His Vahi Jati Pachhal Ramya Ghosha (1965) was in traditional metres but soon he wrote modern long poem Manasni Vaat (1968) exploring new styles. His Mara Namne Darwaje (1972) and Boom Kagalma Kora (1974) deal with absurdity and illogicality of life. Pravahan (1986) is long poem about process of poetry formation paralleled with excretion of feces. Kalagranthi (1987) is the collection of six poems. Tola Avaj Ghonghat (1990) is his acclaimed work. His other collections of poetry are Kalpayan (1999), Kichud Kichud (1999), Hathiyar Vagarno Gha (2000), Samay Samay (1999), Tev, Chhe Pratiksha, I Don't Know, Sir, Chhe, Kathakno Ka, Aav, Me Commit Karyu Chhe Shu? and Ramat.

=== Plays ===
Thakar was heavily influenced by Theatre of the Absurd and Samuel Beckett. He along with playwright Subhash Shah, wrote Ek Undar ane Jadunath based on Beckett's Waiting for Godot in 1966. Ek Undar ane Jadunath is considered to be the first absurd play in Gujarati. His first one-act play Asatyakumar Ekagrani Dharpakad was published in collection of one-act plays, Make Believe (1967) with five other Re School writers. His collection of seven one-act plays, Mari Jawani Maza (1973) is in absurd style. Bathtub ma Machhali (1982), a collection of seven one-act plays, has an overtone of satire and irony. His Pilu Gulab ane Hu (1985) is two-act play about the agony of an actress who is craving true love. It was directed by Kanti Madia. It was originally improvised work for Darpana Academy of Performing Arts. Kahe Koyal Shor Machaye Re (1993) was originally a scene from Pilu Gulab ane Hu (1985) and later produced as one-act play. It was later turned into three-act play. Mansukhlal Majithiya (1993) is six scene play.

He was active in workshops for playwrights called Aakanth Sabarmati.

=== Other ===
Akasmat (1968) and Kon? (1968) are his novels. His humour novels include Hasyayan (1993), Champak Chalisa (1994), Anapsanap (1994), Pivari (1996). He also wrote some more novels later Maro Driver (2002), Bako Chhe, Kalpo (2006) and Kuhoo Kuhoo Bole Koyaliya (2008).

Malela Jeevni Samiksha and Inner Life (1969) are his works of criticism. Inner Life was written with Dinesh Kothari. Malela Jeevni Samiksha is a criticism, written with Chinu Modi and Manhar Modi, of Malela Jeev by Pannalal Patel. His works of journalism and other essays are collected in Ek Minute (1986), Kshana Tatkshana (1989), Sooraj Ugyo Kevadiayani Fanase (1993), Aa Howana Sandarbho, Nisbat, Manjal Thambh Thayelu, Hamari Salam, Vinimayvriksha, Dholi Gaya Je Tadko, Thodo Amasto Tadko, Kagalni Punchhadi and Zakalno Za. Maari Ba (1989) and Bapa Vishe (1993) is a biographical work about his mother and father respectively. He also wrote several books on Ayurveda.

He wrote five children's stories in 1994; Mumbaini Kidi, Kagada Uncle Mamaravala, Nadi-Kanthe Drau Drau, Tadkano Papad and Kanpau Rakshash. Sarva Mitra (1986) is collection of essays on Ayurveda published in his column in Liksatta under pen name Punarvasu. He had edited three akhyanas with Prasad Brahmabhatt; Nalakhyan, Kunwarbai nu Mameru and Sudamacharitra. He published several magazines including Kriti and Unmoolan.

== Awards ==
He received Kumar Chandrak in 1962 and Narmad Suvarna Chandrak also. He was also awarded Ranjitram Suvarna Chandrak in 1980 which he returned for personal reasons and later accepted it in 1994. He was awarded Sahitya Akademi award in 1991 for his poetry, Tola Avaaj Ghonghat. He also received Sahitya Gaurav Puraskar from Gujarati Sahitya Akademi in 2002.

== See also ==
- List of Gujarati-language writers
