= Pramodkumar Patel =

- Born: Pramodkumar Bhagubhai Patel; 20 September 1933; Khara-Abrahma, Valsad district, Gujarat
- Died: 24 May 1996 (aged 62)
- Education: University of Mumbai, Master of Arts, PhD
- Occupation: Literary critic
- Writing career
- Language: Gujarati
- Notable works: Gujaratima Vivechan Tatvavichar (1985); Gujaratima Kavyatatva Vicharna Volume I (1995) and II (1998)

Academic work
- Doctoral students: Jayendra Shekhadiwala

Pramodkumar Bhagubhai Patel (1933–1996) was Gujarati language critic from Gujarat, India.

== Life ==
Patel was born on 20 September 1933 at Khara-Abrahma village (now in Valsad district, Gujarat, India). His family belonged to Moti Karod village. He completed his schooling from Khara-Abhrama. He completed B. A. with Gujarati in 1957 and M. A. in 1959 from University of Bombay. He also completed Ph.D in Gujarati in 1969 from the same university. His subject of thesis was Gujaratima Kavyatatvavichar: Narmad, Navalram, Ramanbhai Nilkanth, Narsinhrao Divetia ane Manilal Dwivedina Kavyavicharnu Samikshatmak Adhyayan. He taught at the arts college in Bardoli initially and later at Sardar Patel University, Vallabh Vidyanagar. He died on 24 May 1996.

== Works ==
His critical focus was on modern literature. Along with theoretical criticism, he also critically examined Gujarati poetry, short stories and novels.

Rasasiddhant – Ek Parichay (1980), Pannalal Patel (1984) and Gujaratima Vivechan Tatvavichar (1985) are his works of criticism. Rasasiddhant – Ek Parichay discusses India poetics and its tradition. Pannalal Patel was published under Gujarati Granthkar Shreni (Gujarati Writer Series) which throw light on personality, influences, creativity development and works of Pannalal Patel. Gujaratima Vivechan Tatvavichar focuses on history of criticism in Gujarati literature.

His other works of criticism are Vibhavna (1977), Shabdalok (1978), Sanketvistar (1980), Kathavivechan Prati (1982), Anubhavan (1984).

His thesis was edited and published in two parts as Gujaratima Kavyatatva Vicharna Volume I (1995) and II (1998).

He edited or co-edited Parisesh (1978), Gadyasanchay-I (1982), Sheshvishesh-84 (1986).

== See also ==
- List of Gujarati-language writers
