= Ravji Patel =

Indian writer

- Born: Ravji Chhotalal Patel; 15 November 1939; Bhatpur, Anand, Gujarat, India
- Died: 10 August 1968 (aged 28); Ahmedabad, Gujarat, India
- Education: under graduate
- Occupations: Poet, Short story writer, Novelist
- Writing career
- Language: Gujarati
- Period: Post-modern Gujarati literature
- Genres: Geet, Free verse, Sonnet, Ghazal
- Notable works: Ashrughar (1966); Jhanza (1967); Angat (1970); Vrutti ane Varta (1977)
- Notable awards: Uma-Snehrashmi Prize (1966-67)
- Literary movement: Re Math

Ravji Patel (15 November 1939 – 10 August 1968) was a modernist poet, short story writer and novelist of Gujarati language.

== Life ==
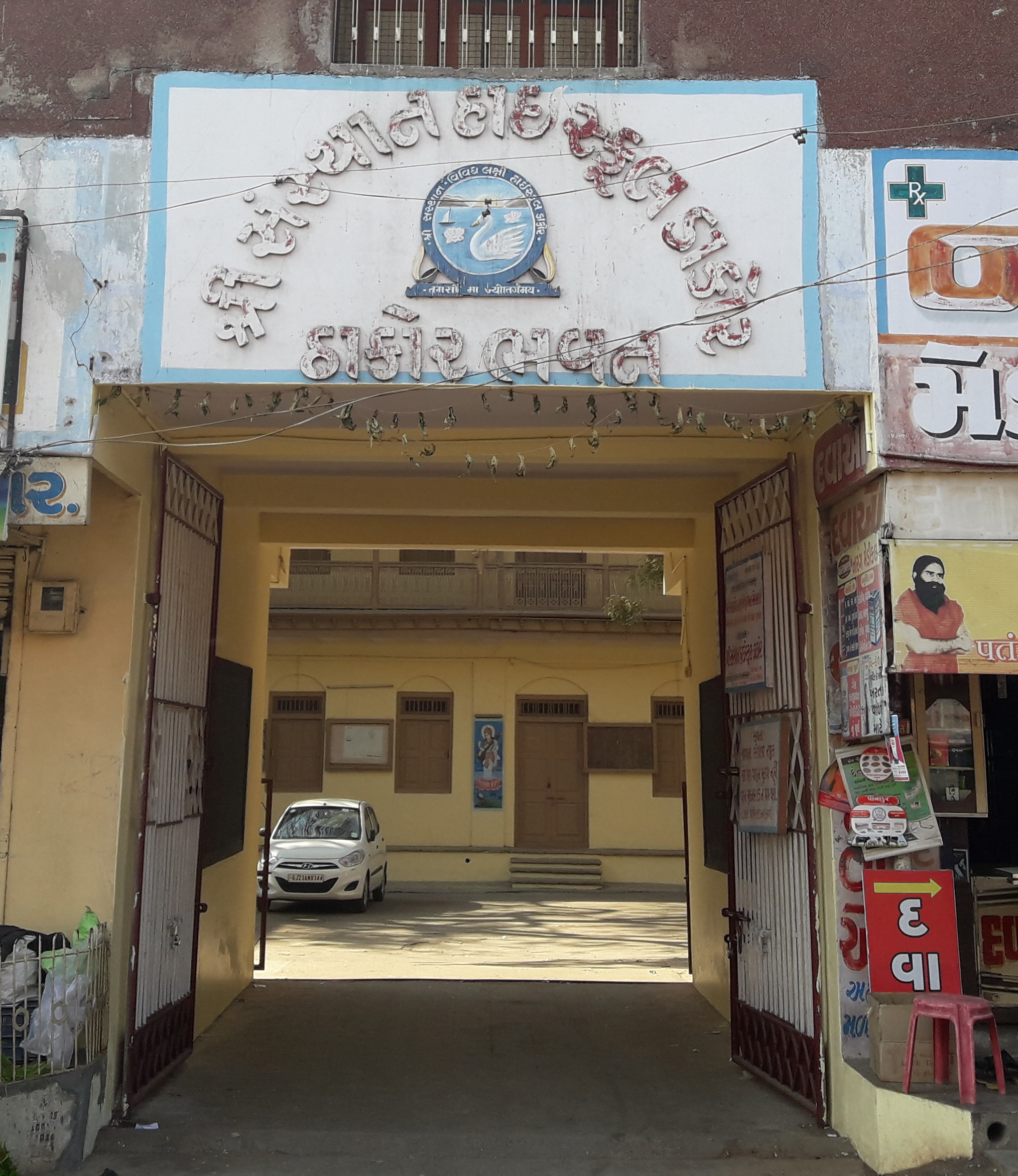
Sansthan High School at Dakor where Ravji studied

He was born in Bhatpur village (now in Anand district, Gujarat) on 15 November 1939. His family was a native of Vallavpura village in Kheda district. He completed his primary education from his village, Vallavpura and moved to Ahmedabad for further education. He completed his S.S.C. from Navchetan High School, Ahmedabad. Then he joined City Arts College, but he could only study up to the second year of college and dropped out owing to financial difficulties. He worked briefly at various places like mills, libraries, newspapers and universities. After staying in Amirgadh and Anand for few months, he died in Ahmedabad on 10 August 1968 due to tuberculosis and mental disorder.

== Works ==
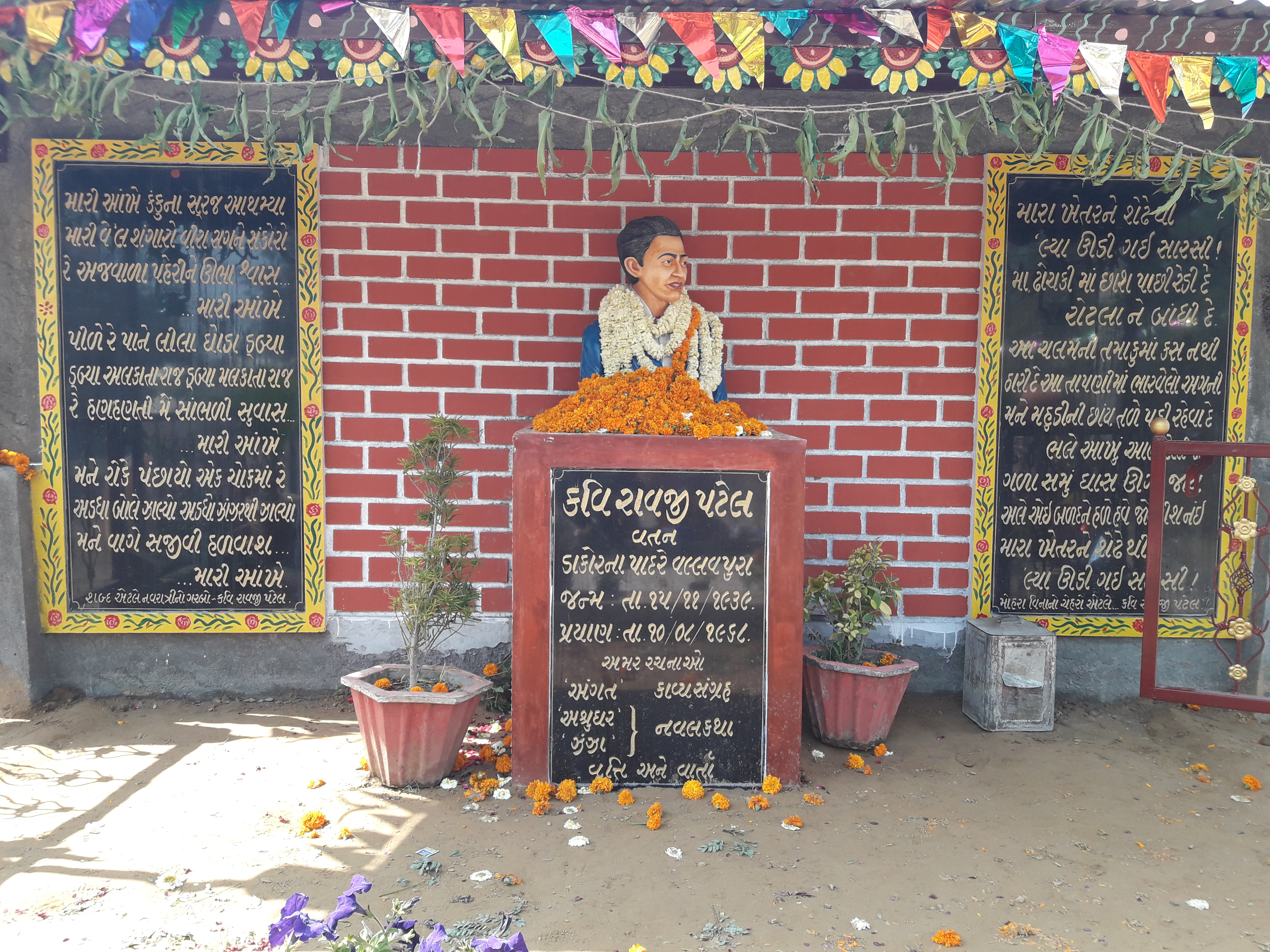
Bust of Ravji Patel inaugurated in 2017 at Dakor

He co-edited poetry journal Shabda with Mukund Parikh.

His only collection Angat (1970) was published posthumously which includes fourteen songs. One of his songs, "Mari Aankhe Kankuna Suraj Athamya" is considered as the landmark in Gujarati literature. The song flags a great change in the trends and styles of writing in Gujarati literature, bringing it into what is now known as the modern Gujarati literary trend.

Ashrughar (1966; House of Tears) is his novel about a person suffering from tuberculosis. Jhanjha (1967; Foggy) is his other novel. Both are considered experimental novels. Vrutti ane Varta (1977) includes his incomplete story Vrutti. Rakh Pan Bole Chhe is his one-act play published in third issue of Kriti magazine. Some of his letters to fellow authors are published in Ravji Patel by Mafat Oza.

In 2018, Gujarati Vishwakosh Trust published his biography entitled Mol Bharelu Khetar, written by Manilal H. Patel.
