= Jawahar Bakshi =

Gujarati poet

Jawaharr Bakshi
- Born: 19 February 1947 (age 79); Junagadh, Gujarat
- Citizenship: Indian
- Occupation: Poet
- Writing career
- Language: Gujrati
- Notable work: Tarapanana shaherma (1999)
- Notable awards: Narmad Suvarna Chandrak; Kalapi Award; Kavishwar Dalpatram Award; Narsinh Mehta Award

Jawahar Ravirai Bakshi (born 19 February 1947) is a Gujarati poet from Gujarat, India.

== Biography ==
Jawahar Bakshi was born on 19 February 1947 in Junagadh to Nilavati and Ravirai Bakshi. He completed his schooling from Swami Vivekanand Vinay Mandir. He completed Bachelor of Commerce from Sydenham College of Commerce and Economics in Bombay (now Mumbai) in 1964 and became a chartered accountant.

Bakshi wrote his first ghazal in 1959 and had written more than 700 ghazals. His ghazals explore spirituality. Tarapanana Shaherma (1999) and Parpotana Killa (2012) are his ghazal collections having 108 and 11 ghazals respectively. He has received prizes from Gujarati Sahitya Parishad and Gujarat Sahitya Akademi. He was awarded Narmad Suvarna Chandrak in 1998. He was also awarded Kalapi Award for his ghazals in 2006. He was awarded the Kavishwar Dalpatram Award for 2019. He received the 2020 Narsinh Mehta Award.

== Personal life ==
Bakshi married Daksha and they have a daughter named Pooja.

== See also ==
- List of Gujarati-language writers
