= Mafat Oza =

- Born: 1 March 1944; Jamla village, British India (now in Mehsana district, Gujarat, India)
- Died: 28 December 1997 (aged 53); Vadodara, Gujarat, India
- Education: M.A., Ph.D.
- Alma mater: Gujarat University
- Occupations: Poet, novelist, critic, editor
- Spouse: Savita Oza
- Children: 2 daughters, 1 son
- Writing career
- Language: Gujarati
- Notable works: Dhummasnu Aa Nagar (1974); Ghughvata Sagarna Maun (1974)

Academic background
- Thesis: Post-Independence Gujarati Poetry: In Context of Theme, Emotions and Its Depiction (1977)
- Doctoral advisor: Ramanlal Joshi

Signature
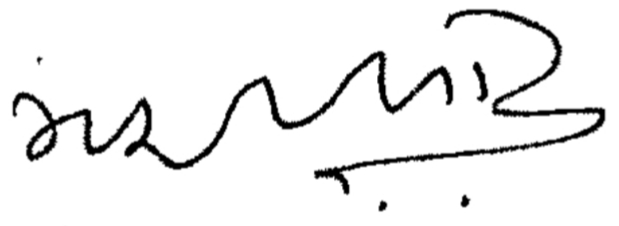

Mafat Jivram Oza was a Gujarati poet, novelist, short story writer, literary critic, and editor from Gujarat, India. In addition to his own literary output, he founded a literary organisation, a publication house, and Tadarthya, a literary magazine.

== Life ==
Mafat Oza was born on 1 March 1944 in Jamla village (now part of Mehsana district, Gujarat). He completed his primary education in Jamla and secondary education in Soja village, Mehsana district. He obtained his S.S.C. in 1962 and a B. A. in Gujarati and Hindi in 1967 followed by a M. A. in Gujarati and Sanskrit in 1969 from the Gujarat University. He was awarded a Ph.D. in 1977 for his thesis Swatantryottar Gujarati Kavita (Post-independence Gujarati Poetry) from the Saraspur Arts and Commerce College, Ahmedabad.

He worked as a primary teacher on the Ahmedabad School Board for five years starting some time in 1963–64. He later served as the professor of Gujarati in the Saraspur Arts College from 1969 to 1978, after which he accepted a professorship with the Maharaja Sayajirao University of Baroda and, in 1983, the School of Languages, Gujarat University. He was appointed a member of the Gujarat Public Service Commission in 1991 where he served for six years before retiring.

He was instrumental in organising literary conferences in Ahmedabad and established Kavyagoshthi, a literary organisation with help of his poet friends. He also established a publication house called Purvi Pustak Bhandar and a literary magazine Tadarthya in 1986.

He died on 28 December 1997 in Vadodara during the biannual meet of Gujarati Sahitya Parishad.

== Works ==
Mafat Oza started writing during his school years when he wrote the poem, "Flu", in 1956. During his college years, his poems were published in the Kumar and Buddhiprakash magazines.

Dhummasnu Aa Nagar (1974), Padaghanu Chakaratu Akash (1975), Ashubh (1976), Shwas Bhitarethi Fore (1978), Updown (1984), Fulono Pavanrath (1995) are his collections of modern poetry; Oza published his elegy in Ashubh.

His first novel, Ghughvata Sagarna Maun (1974) about the role of inheritance and environment in a dysfunctional family, brought him recognition. Later publications include: Pilu Karennu Ful (1975), Paththarni Kaya Ansuna Darpan (1976), Sapna Badha Majana (1977), Ame To Pankharna Ful (1978), Ame Tarasya Sajan (1979), Suraj Dube Mrigajalma (1981), Satamo Purush (1982), Soneri Sapnani Rakh (1984), Aansuno Ugyo Gulmahor (1984), Mrigajal To Doorna Door (1985), Chahera Vachche Lohini Nadi (1985), Jatar (1987) and Aaso Sud Atham (1991), the latter two which depict changing lives in villages.

Non-novel works of Oza include Kachna Mahelni Rani (1974) and Tadkama Ogalato Surya (1983), both short story collections, Lila Pila Jwalamukhi (1978), a collection of one-act plays, Palpalna Pratibimb, a collection of his essays, Unnatbhu (1975), Udghosh (1977), Unmati (1978), Ravji Patel (on Ravji Patel, 1981), Sanvitti (1985) and Vivechanne Padkar, which are critiques.

Oza also published works on poetry, such as Kavyanu Shilp, as well as books on authors and literary genres. One notable work is Sundaram - Sarjak Pratibha (1991) which was written about Sundaram. He also published special issues of his magazine Tadarthya in book form. In 1980, he published his thesis Svatantryottar Gujarati Kavita. He edited Prayogshil Gujarati Tunki Varta (1986) and Ekoktisanchay (1986) as well as co-edited Dhumketuni Bhavshrishti (1973) and Shabdayog (1984).

== See also ==
- List of Gujarati-language writers
