= Dhirubhai Thaker =

Indian writer, editor of Gujarati Vishwakosh

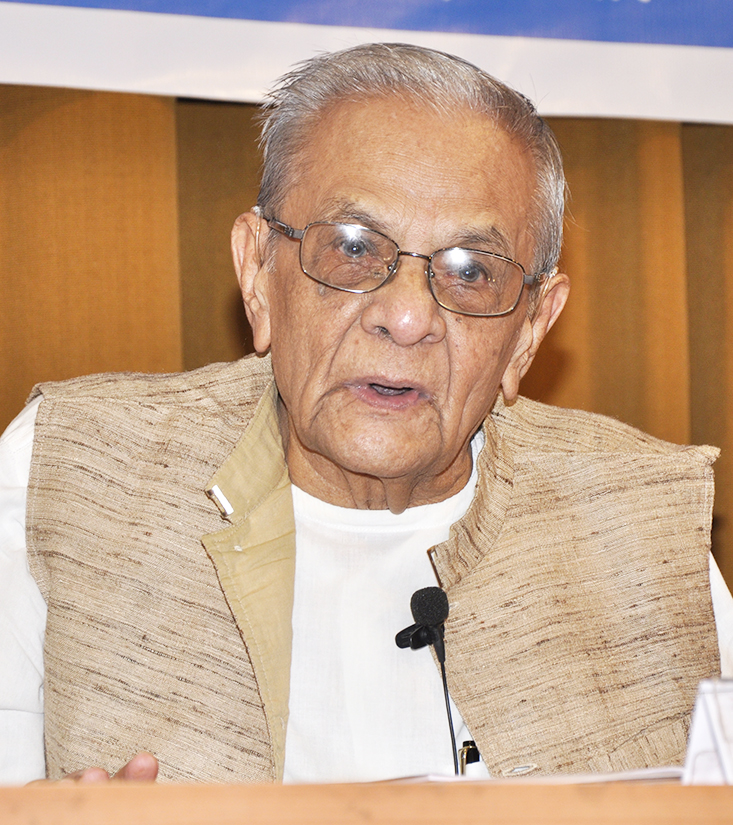
- Thaker in September 2012 at Gujarat Vishwakosh Trust
- Born: 27 June 1918; Kodinar, Gujarat, India
- Died: 22 January 2014 (aged 95); Ahmedabad, Gujarat
- Education: Elphinstone College (1936–1939; BA)
- Occupation: Author
- Writing career
- Language: Gujarati
- Notable awards: Ranjitram Suvarna Chandrak (1994); Sahitya Gaurav Puraskar (1998); Narmad Suvarna Chandrak (2012); Padma Bhushan (2014)

Academic background
- Thesis: 'Manilal Nabhubhai: Sahitya Sadhana' (1956)
- Doctoral advisor: Ramnarayan V. Pathak

Academic work
- Doctoral students: Kumarpal Desai; Pravin Darji; Manilal H. Patel

Dhirubhai Premshankar Thaker (27 June 1918 – 22 January 2014) was an Indian Gujarati writer, who was best known for creating the Gujarati Vishwakosh, a 25-volume encyclopaedia of the Gujarati language.

== Life ==
Thaker was born on 27 June 1918 in Kodinar, a city now in Gir Somnath District, Gujarat, India to his father Premshankar Thaker, and mother, Gomtibahen. His father was a Talati (village development officer) and was fond of reading literature. Thaker was a native of Viramgam, a town in Ahmedabad district.

He completed his primary education from Kodinar and Chanasma while secondary education from Chanasma and Siddhpur. He completed matriculation in 1934 from L. S. High School, Siddhapur with Sanskrit and Science subjects. He received a BA from Elphinstone College in 1939 with Gujarati (Honours) and Sanskrit, and a MA in 1941 from the same college with Gujarati. In 1938, Mumbai University awarded him the M. M. Paramanand Prize for his research work. Oganisami Sadini Pashchim Bharatni Dharmik Chalavalo (Religious Activities of 19th Century India).

He was a professor at Gujarat College until 1960. In 1956, he received PhD under Ramnarayan V. Pathak from Gujarat College for his thesis Manilal Nabhubhai: Sahitya Sadhana, a research work on the life and works of Manilal Dwivedi. He joined Modasa College in 1960. He retired from there later. He also served as a president of Gujarati Sahitya Parishad from 1999 to 2001. He died on 24 January 2014 at Ahmedabad.

In his honour, the Dhirubhai Thakar Savyasachi Saraswat Award has been awarded annually by Gujarat Vishwakosh Trust, Ahmedabad since 2013.

== Works ==
He was a lecturer by profession. He wrote criticism, essays, research and plays.

He had written ten works on criticism, seven collections of essays, two research works, three biographies including his autobiography. He had also written one biographical play, two children's plays, one travelogue and two translations. He had edited four study works, sixteen literary works, nine collections (with others) and history of Gujarati literature. He wrote a biography of Manilal Dwivedi entitled Manilal Nabhubhai: Jeevanrang. He wrote a biographical play, Uncho Parvat, Undi Khin (1993, 'Lofty Mountain, Cavernous Valley'), based on the life of Manilal Dwivedi. It was awarded a prize by Batubhai Umarvadia Centre for being the best play. He translated Pablo Neruda's Memoirs as Satyani Mukhomukha : Pablo Nerudana 'Memoirs'no Anuvāda (2010).

He assembled 1700 subject experts to work on Gujarati Vishwakosh, a 25-volume encyclopaedia of the Gujarati language which contains 25,000 pages and 23,000 entries.

== Awards ==
He was the recipient of the Ranjitram Suvarna Chandrak, the highest literary award in Gujarati language, in 1994 and the Narmad Suvarna Chandrak in 2012. He had received Sahitya Gaurav Puraskar in 1998.

He was awarded Padma Bhushan on 25 January 2014 for his contribution in field of literature and education.

== See also ==
- List of Gujarati-language writers
