= Bhanuprasad Pandya =

Indian poet and critic

- Born: 24 April 1932
- Died: 9 April 2022 (aged 89)
- Occupations: Poet; literary critic
- Writing career
- Language: Gujarati
- Notable awards: Kumar Suvarna Chandrak (1969); Narsinh Mehta Award (2011); Kavishwar Dalpatram Award (2011); Dhanji Kanji Gandhi Suvarna Chandrak (2016)

Academic background
- Thesis: Gujarati Novel from 1950 to 1970 – a Critical Study (with Special Reference to Form) (1977)
- Doctoral advisor: Anantrai Raval

Bhanuprasad Moolshankar Pandya (24 April 1932 – 9 April 2022) was an Indian Gujarati-language poet and literary critic from Gujarat, India. For his contribution, he received Kumar Suvarna Chandrak (1969), Narsinh Mehta Award (2011), Kavishwar Dalpatram Award (2011), and Dhanji Kanji Gandhi Suvarna Chandrak (2016).

== Biography ==
Bhanuprasad Pandya was born on 24 April 1932 in Tori, Amreli, Gujarat in an audichya sahastra Zalavadi Brahmins family to his mother Shivkunwarbahen Pandya and his father Moolshankar Pandya, a schoolteacher and principal, from whom he inherited a literary bent of mind. Pandya completed his schooling in Amreli, and passed the matriculation exam in 1954. He received his B.A. in 1958 with Gujarati and Psychology subjects, and an M.A. in 1960 with Gujarati and Sanskrit subjects. He submitted his doctoral dissertation Gujarati Novel from 1950 to 1970 – a Critical Study (with Special Reference to Form) under Anantrai Raval.

Pandya died on 9 April 2022.

== Works ==
His poetry collections include Adoad (1972), Otaprot (1987), Shabde Korya Shilpa (1999), Kshan Samipe Kshan Door Door (2003), and Shabda na Antarpate (2012). In 2019, Gujarat Sahitya Akademi published his complete poems under the title Shabde Korya Shilpa. His works of criticism include Pratyudagar (1978), Itarodagar (1981), Sonnet: Shilpa ane Sarjan (1981), Anuspand (1987), Anucharvana (1989), Samalok (1991), Manovaijnanik Navalkatha: Svarup ane Vikas (2001), Anusanket (2003), Sampratiti (2010), and Ubhayanvay (2015).

== Awards ==
Pandya received Kumar Suvarna Chandrak (1969), Narsinh Mehta Award (2011), Kavishwar Dalpatram Award (2011), and Dhanji Kanji Gandhi Suvarna Chandrak (2016).
