= Bhanuprasad Trivedi =

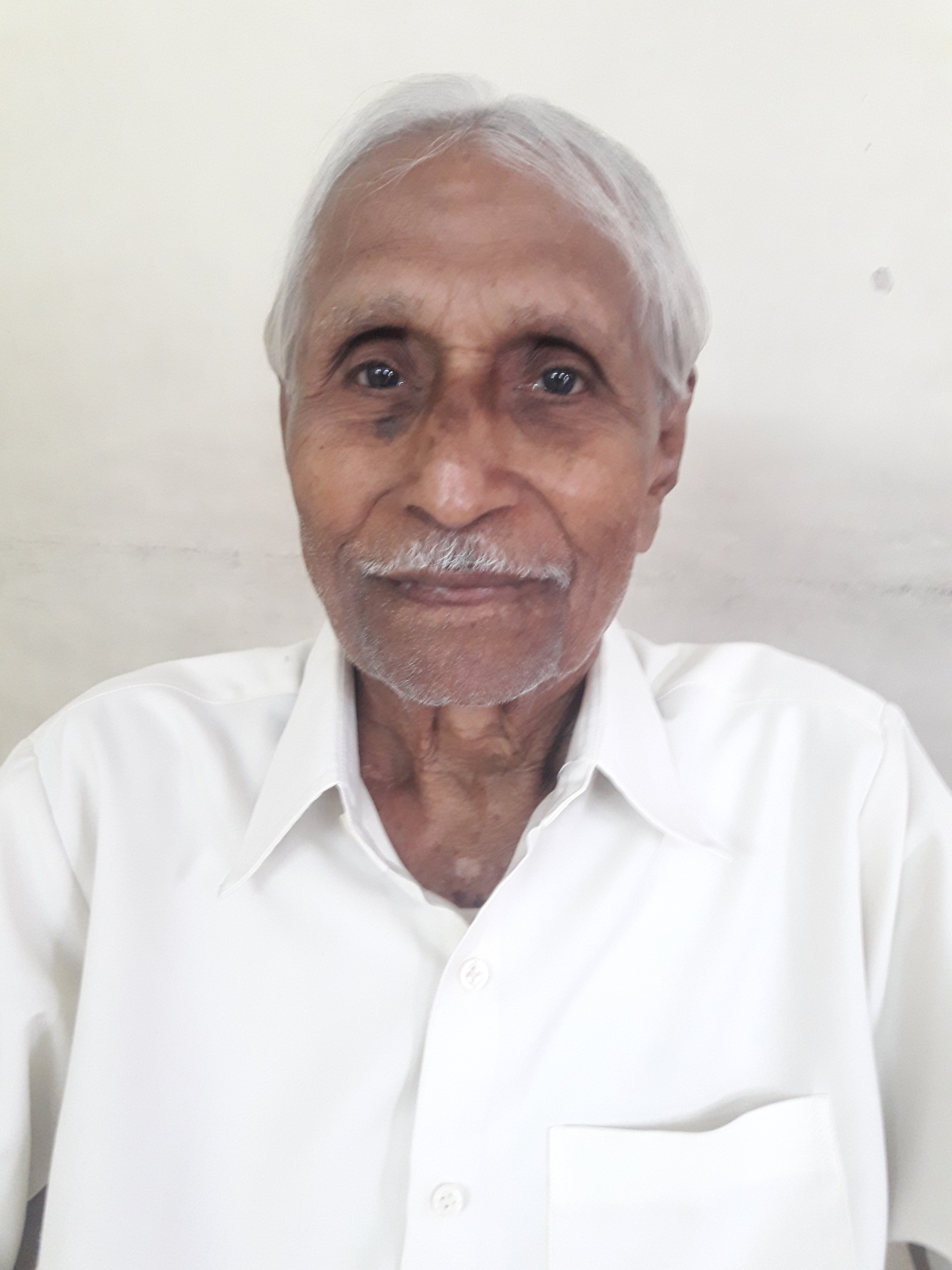
- Trivedi at his home in Gandhinagar; October 2018
- Born: January 16, 1931 (age 95); Vavol, Gandhinagar district, Gujarat
- Education: Master of Arts
- Occupations: Novelist, playwright, poet
- Writing career
- Language: Gujarati
- Notable works: Alasgamna (1975); Ek Hatu Amdavad (1981)
- Notable awards: Critics’ award (1984, 1989)

Bhanuprasad Bholanath Trived (born 16 January 1931) is Gujarati novelist, playwright and poet from Gujarat, India.

== Life ==
Bhanuprasad Trivedi was born on 16 January 1931 at Vavol village (now in Gandhinagar district, Gujarat). He passed matriculation in 1949 and completed B. A. with Gujarati and Sanskrit in 1955 and M. A. in same subjects in 1967. He taught for nine years at schools in Linch and Kherva in Mehsana district. He served as a principal in school of Chitroda, Sabarkantha in 1962-63 and of school in Pratapnagar from 1963 to 1969. He served as a professor in C. U. Shah Arts College, Ahmedabad until his retirement in 1970.

== Works ==
His first novel Ek Hatu Amdavad (1981) is set in Ahmedabad and centered on a journey of man from serving as a school librarian to becoming a professor. Shalvan (1984) is about a protagonist finding what was lost by her. His Sheshpatra (1989) is a satire novel on corruption in fourteen chapters covering seventeen characters. Vikshipta (1993) is his fourth novel. Moment (1974) is a collection of six one-act plays. Alasgamana (1975) is collection of 53 poems while Sangat (1975) is collection of songs. His other works are Chandan ane Sadhu, Abhyantar.

== Recognition ==
He received critics’ award in 1984 and 1989. His one-act play collection Moment received the prize of Government of Gujarat.
