= Rajendra Shah (poet) =

Indian lyrical poet and author

- Born: 28 January 1913; Kapadvanj, Bombay Presidency, British India
- Died: 2 January 2010 (aged 96); Mumbai, Maharashtra, India
- Education: MSU Baroda
- Occupation: Author
- Writing career
- Period: 1947-2003
- Notable works: Dhvani (1951); Shant Kolahal (1962)
- Notable awards: Kumar Chandrak (1947); Ranjitram Suvarna Chandrak (1956); Sahitya Akademi Award (1963); Sahitya Gaurav Puraskar (1992); Narsinh Mehta Award (1999); Jnanpith Award (2001)

Rajendra Keshavlal Shah (28 January 1913 – 2 January 2010) was an Indian Gujarati-language poet from Gujarat, India. Born in Kapadvanj, he authored more than 20 collections of poems and songs, mainly on the themes of the beauty of nature, and about the everyday lives of indigenous peoples and fisherfolk communities. In his poems using Sanskrit metrics, he was influenced by Rabindranath Tagore. He is considered one of the giants of the post-Gandhi era in Gujarati literature.

Among his various professions, Shah was also a publisher in Mumbai, where he launched the poetry magazine Kavilok in 1957. The press itself became an important Sunday meeting-place for Gujarati poets. Apart from writing poetry, Shah also translated into Gujarati Tagore's poetry collection Balaaka; Jayadeva's Gita Govinda; Coleridge's The Rime of the Ancient Mariner; and Dante's The Divine Comedy. Shah received the Jnanpith Award for 2001.

== Biography ==
Shah was born in 1913 in Kapadvanj, a town in the erstwhile Bombay Presidency of British India (in present-day Kheda district of Gujarat, India). After attending Wilson College in Mumbai, he graduated with a degree in philosophy from the Maharaja Sayajirao University of Baroda. Shah's first poem came in print in Wilsonian, the college magazine of the Wilson College, in 1933.

In 1930, he discontinued from the study, as he was arrested in Civil disobedience movement and sentenced to the jail. In 1931, he married Manjula Agrawal. Later, in 1934, he earned his bachelor's degree in philosophy from The Maharaja Sayajirao University of Baroda, and thereafter, started his career by teaching school students in Ahmedabad.

He died on 2 January 2010 in Mumbai.

== Bibliography ==
=== Poetry collections ===
- Dhvani (1951)
- Andolan (1952)
- Shruti (1957)
- Morpinchh (1959)
- Shant Kolahal (1962)
- Chitrana (1967)
- Kshan je Chirantan (1968)
- Vishadne Saad (1968)
- Madhyama (1978)
- Ikshana (1979)
- Udgiti (1979)
- Patralekha (1981)
- Prasang Saptak (1982)
- Dwasupama (1983)
- Panch Parva (1983)
- Vibhavan (1983)
- Chandan Bhini and Anamik (1987)
- Aranyak (1992)
- Smritisamvedana (1998)
- Virahmadhuri (1999)
- Vrajvaikunthe (2002)
- Ha... Hu Sakshi Chhu' (2003)
- Premno Paryay (2004)
- Aa Gagan (2005)

== Awards ==
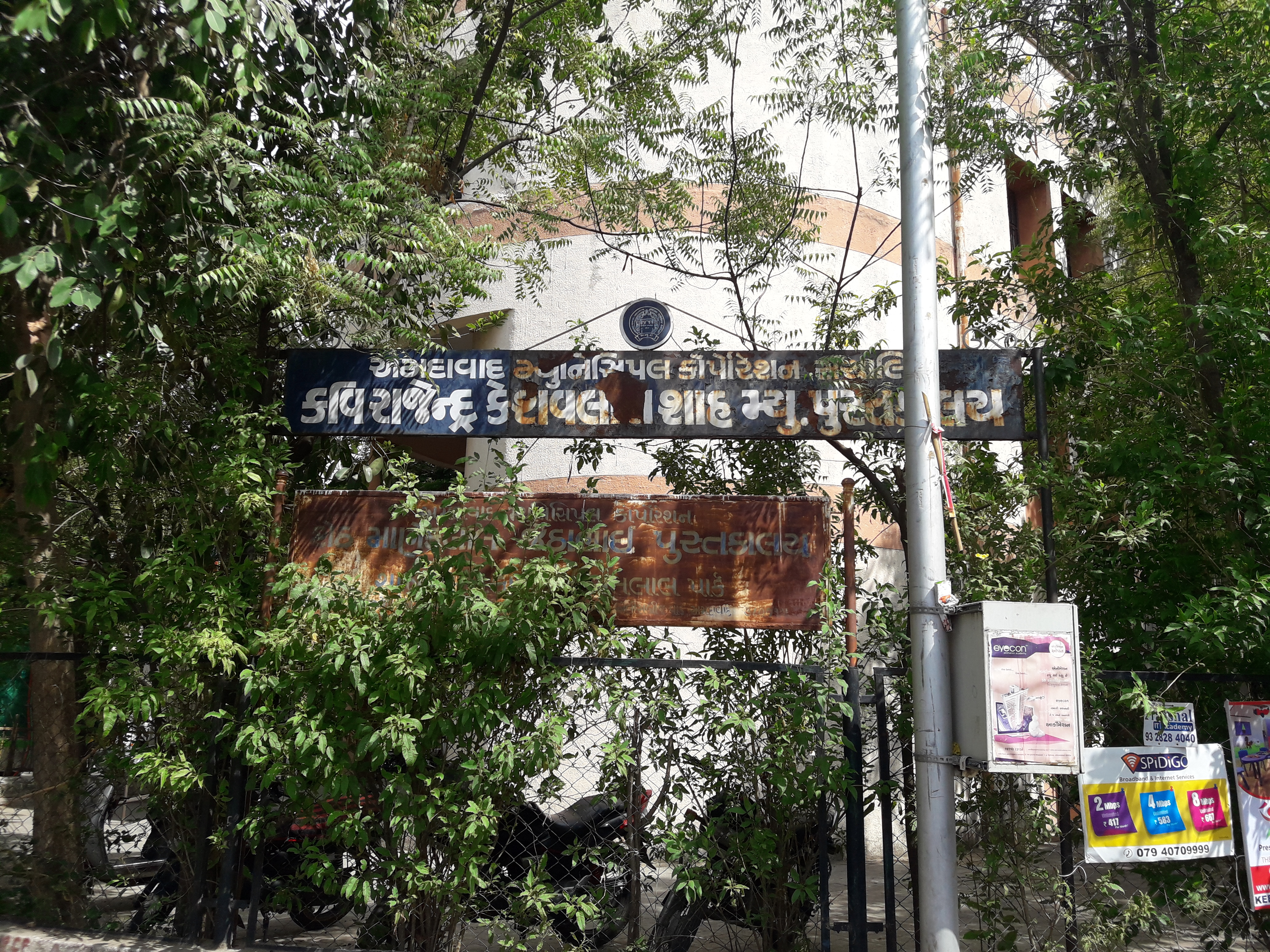
Kavi Rajendra Keshavlal Shah Library located near Himmatlal Park in Ahmedabad

He won Kumar Chandrak in 1947, Ranjitram Suvarna Chandrak in 1956. He received Sahitya Akademi Award (1963) for his book Shant Kolahal. He is also a recipient of Aurobindo Suvarna Chandrak presented (1980) by Gujarati Sahitya Parishad, Sahitya Gaurav Puraskar (1992) and Narsinh Mehta Award (1999). He received Jnanpith Award, considered to be India's highest literary award, in 2001. The judges noted, "his intensity of emotion and innovation in form and expression which set him apart as a poet of great significance. The mystical tone of his poetry stems from the tradition of great medieval masters like Narsinh Mehta, Kabir and Akho."
