= Ramanlal Joshi =

Indian literary critic and editor (1926-2006)

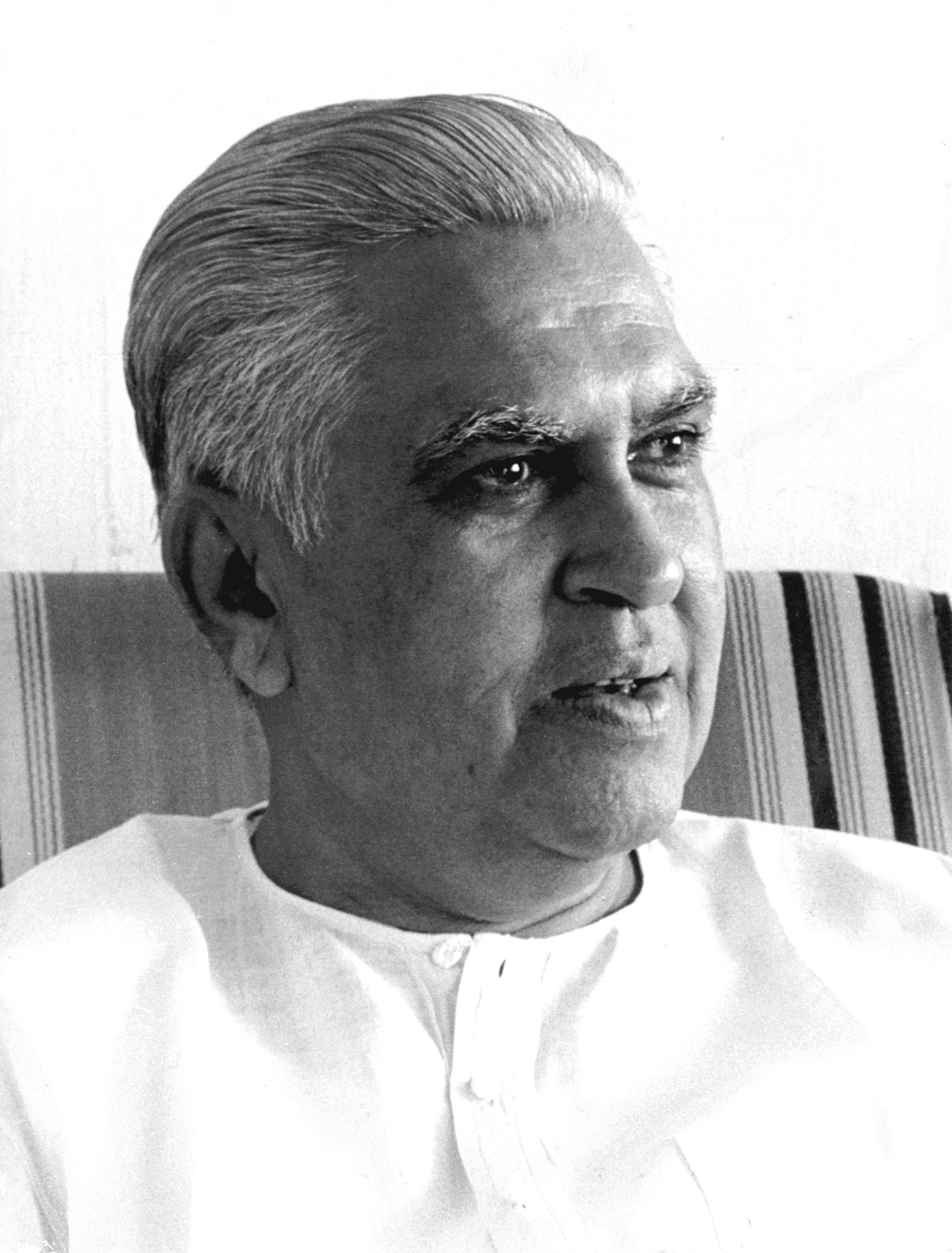
- Born: 22 May 1926; Heerpura village, Vijapur, Gujarat
- Died: 10 September 2006 (aged 80); Ahmedabad
- Education: Master of Arts; Ph.D
- Occupations: literary critic, editor
- Writing career
- Language: Gujarati
- Notable work: Vivechanni Prakriya (1981)
- Notable awards: Sahitya Akademi Award (1984); Sahitya Gaurav Puraskar (2001)

Academic background
- Thesis: Govardhanram - A Study
- Doctoral advisor: Umashankar Joshi

Academic work
- Doctoral students: Mafat Oza

Ramanlal Jethalal Joshi (22 May 1926 – 10 September 2006) was Gujarati language literary critic and editor from India. He studied and later taught at Gujarat University in Ahmedabad. He served at several literary and educational institutions. He edited, authored and published criticism in more than forty-two books. He was awarded the Sahitya Akademi Award in 1984.

== Biography ==
Ramanlal was born on 22 May 1926 in Heerpura near Vijapur in north Gujarat to Jethalal and Maniben. His family belonged to Vadnagar village. He completed primary education from Vadnagar, and secondary education from Pilvai in north Gujarat. He completed Bachelor of Arts in Gujarati and Sanskrit in 1950 from Vadodara and Master of Arts in same subjects in 1954 from the University of Bombay. He was a research fellow at School of Languages, Gujarat University from 1954 to 1959. He taught at GLS Arts College from 1959 to 1962. He completed PhD under Umashankar Joshi in 1962 from Gujarat University. He joined the School of Languages in Gujarat University and served as a professor from 1962 to 1968, as a reader from 1969 to 1979, a lecturer of Gujarati from 1979. In 1986, he retired from the post of Director of the School of Languages and Literature, Gujarat University. He later served as the director of College Development Council of Gujarat University.

He served as the chairman of the Gujarat Sahitya Akademi from 1986 to 1987. He also served as the vice president of Gujarati Sahitya Parishad from 1984 to 1988. He was a member of General Council of Sahitya Akademi, New Delhi from 1983 to 1987. He was the Emeritus Fellow of University Grant Commission from 1988 to 1998. He was also adviser of Gujarati for Encyclopedia of Indian Literature. He was a founder editor of literary magazine, Uddesh from August 1990. He died on 10 September 2006 in Ahmedabad.

== Works ==
His five decades works of criticism, research, and editing are published in 42 books. His works of criticism are Govardhanram: Ek Adhyayan (1963, updated 1978), Abhipsa (1968–78), Pariman (1969), Shabdasetu (1970), Pratyaya (1970), Bharatiya Naval Katha Vol I (1974), Samantar (1976), Viniyog (1977), Gujarati Sahitya Sabhani Katyavahi : 1963 (1977), Vivechanni Prakriya (1981), Pragnyamurti Govardhanram (1986), Nishpatti (1988), Parivesh (1988), Vivechan ni Abohava (1989), Aadivachan (1995), Nirupan (1999) and Granthno Panth (1999).

His books in English are Govardhanram (1979), Variation on a Theme: Essays on Gujarati Literature (1993). Govardhanram is a monograph on Govardhanram Tripathi. Sva. Sakshar Navalram Laxmiram nu Jivanvrutant ane Kavijivan (1966), Shabdalok na Yatrio 1–2 (1983) and Akshatna Aradhako 1–2 (1998) are his biographical works.

He coedited Akhegeeta (1967, 1978, with Umashankar Joshi) and Akha na Kavyo (1995), the collection of poetry by medieval poet, Akho. He also coedited Kavyasanchay-3 (1981, with Jayant Pathak), Uttamlal ni Gadyasiddhi (1972, with Ramprasad Bakshi), Govardhan Pratibha (1983), Phool Zare Gulmahor (1982, 1984, selected stories of Gulabdas Broker), Gurushishya Samvad (with Dhiru Parikh), Sundaramna Kavyoi, Jyotirekha, Sundaramni Pratinidhi Vartao (1989). He edited Gujarati Granthkar Shreni, a short biographical series on Gujarati litterateurs published by Gujarati Sahitya Parishad, from 1976 to his death in 2006.

== Awards ==
Ramanlal Jethalal Joshi Road in Navrangpura, Ahmedabad, was named after him

He was awarded Sahitya Akademi award in 1984 for his work on process of criticism, Vivechanni Prakriya. He also received Anantrai Raval Criticism Award in 1993 for his contribution in field of criticism. He was also awarded Gujarat Sahitya Akademi's Sahitya Gaurav Puraskar (in a collaboration with Raghuveer Chaudhari) in 2001.

== See also ==
- List of Gujarati-language writers
