= Manilal H. Patel =

Indian poet, essayist, novelist, and literary critic (Born: 1949)

Manilal Haridas Patel
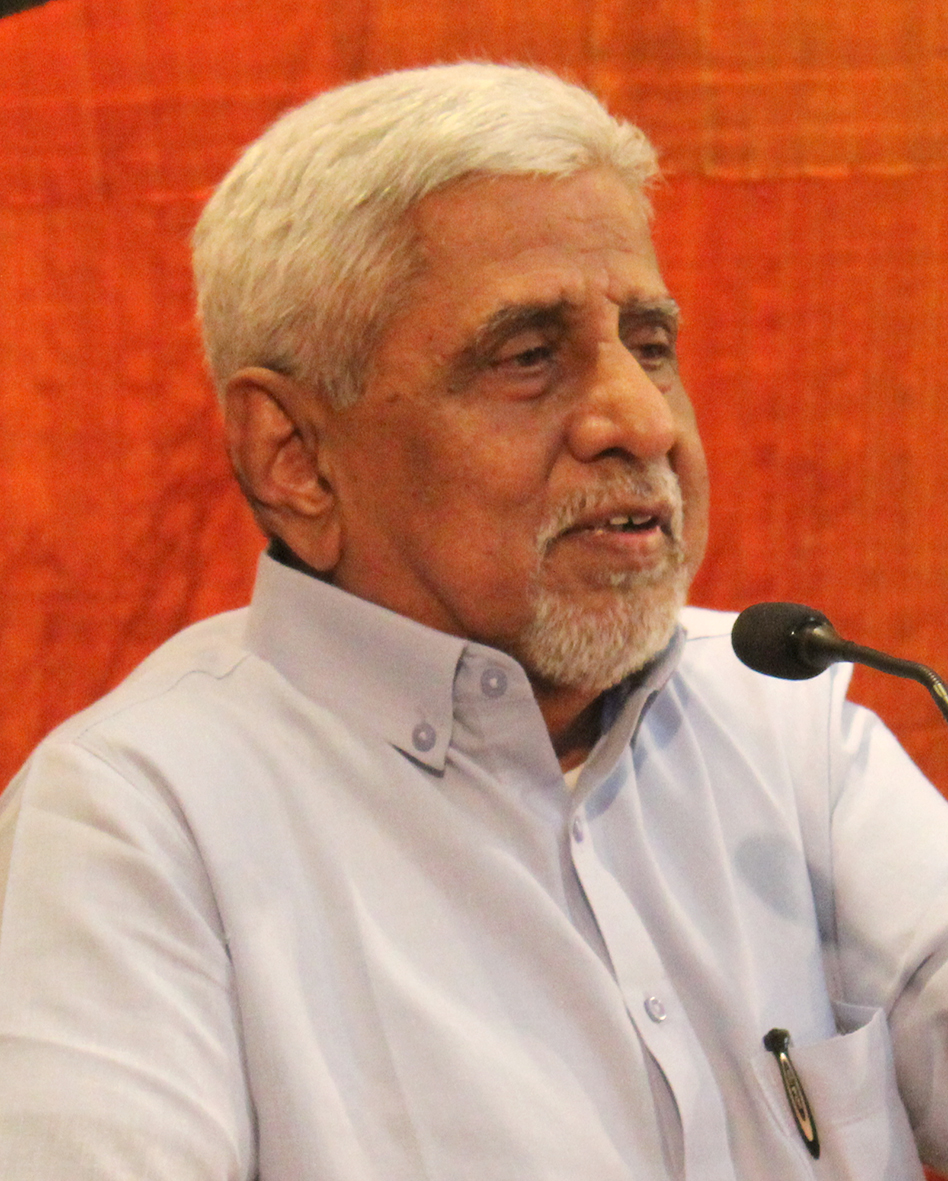
- At Gujarat Vishwakosh Trust, 11 May 2019
- Born: 9 November 1949 (age 76); Golana Palla, Lunavada Taluka, Panchmahal, Bombay State (now Mahisagar district, Gujarat)
- Education: M.A., Ph.D.
- Occupations: Poet, essayist, novelist, short story writer, literary critic
- Spouse: Gopi (m. 1972)
- Children: Two sons, one daughter
- Writing career
- Language: Gujarati
- Notable works: Padma Vinana Deshma (1983); Bhusata Gramchitro (2000)
- Notable awards: Uma-Snehrashmi Prize (1994-1995); Ushnas Prize (1996-1997)

Academic background
- Thesis: Depiction of Love in Modern Gujarati Poetry (1978)
- Doctoral advisor: Dhirubhai Thaker

Academic work
- Doctoral students: Ajaysinh Chauhan

Signature
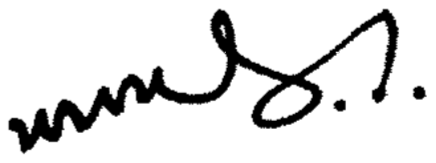

Manilal Haridas Patel (born 9 November 1949) is a Gujarati poet, essayist, novelist, and literary critic from Gujarat, India. He has won numerous awards for his work, including the 2007 Dhanji Kanji Gandhi Suvarna Chandrak literary medal for his significant contributions to Gujarati literature.

== Life ==
Patel was born on 9 November 1949 in the village of Golana Palla near Lunavada (now in the Mahisagar district, Gujarat) to Ambaben and Haridas, an agriculturist. He had five siblings. Patel studied at a school in his village until grade four, and then attended a school in the nearby village of Madhvas. He completed his Secondary School Certificate (S.S.C.) in 1967. He completed a B. A. in Gujarati and English in 1971 and a M. A. in Gujarati and Sanskrit in 1973. In 1979, Patel received a PhD for his thesis Arvachin Gujarati Kavitama Pranaynirupan (Depiction of Love in Modern Gujarati Poetry) under the guidance of Dhirubhai Thaker.

He taught briefly at schools in Vadagam and Madhvas. He taught Gujarati at the Arts and Commerce College, Idar from 1973 to 1987. In 1987, Patel joined the Sardar Patel University in Vallabh Vidyanagar as the Reader of Gujarati and was later promoted to professor and head of the department. He retired in 2012. He edited the Dasmo Dayko, Paraspar 1-2-3, Sheelshrutam and Pragnya magazines.

== Works ==
His poetry is a combination of romanticism and classicism. He wrote poetry touching on his experiences in and around Idar, a town in Gujarat. Padma Vinana Deshma (1983) and Satami Ritu (1988), Dungar Kori Ghar Karya (1996), Patzar (1999, Hindi), Vichchhed (2006) and Mati ane Megh (2017) are his poetry collections.

The novels Patel has written include: Tarasghar (1979), Ghero (1984), Killo (1986), Andharu (1990), Lalita (1995), and Anjal (2004). Ratvaso (1993) and Bapano Chhello Kagal (2001), Sadabahar Vartao Chayan (2002) and Sudha Ane Biji Varta (2007) are his story collections. Manilal H. Patelni Vartasrishti (2005) is a collection of his selected stories.

Patel's essays have been collected and published in: Mukhomukh (1988), Vrikshalok (1997), Mativato (1993), Matina Manekhe (1993), Bhusata Gramchitro (2000), Malakni Maya (2002), Koi Saad Pade Chhe (1988), Aksharne Ajvale (1993), Vela Velani Vaat (2004), Aada Dungar Ubhi Vat (2006), and Sarjakno Samajlok (2007). Aranyoma Akash Dholay Chhe (1985) is a collection of narrative essays, some autobiographical in nature.

Hu To Nitya Pravasi (1996) is a travelogue. Tarasya Malakno Megh (2007) is a biography of Pannalal Patel. He has translated Ramdarash Mishra's Apane Log from Hindi to Gujarati as Sagavhala. Kavitanu Shikshan (co-written, 1979), Jivankatha (1986), Ishwar Petlikar (1984), Nibandhkar Suresh Joshi (1989), Parishkrut Varta Ane Bija Lekho (1999), Sarjak Ravji Patel (2004), Gujarati Prem Kavita (1993) are his works of criticism. Parishkrut Gujarati Varta (1991), 1996ni Shreshth Vartao (1997), 1997ni shreshth Vartao (1998), Okhaharan (1998), Ratiragni Vartao (1999), Himanshi Shelatni Vartashrishti (1999), Raino Parvat are edited by him. Patel has also edited Gujarati Sonnet (with Dakshesh Thacker, 2002), Suman Shahni Vartashrishti (2003), Ravji Patelni Kavita Chayan (2005), Kathashrishti (2005), Navi Varta Shrishti (2004), Gujarati Bhashanu Adhyayan (2006), Rag Parag (2007).

== Awards ==
Patel was awarded the Dhanji Kanji Gandhi Suvarna Chandrak literary medal in 2007 for his significant contributions to Gujarati literature. He was also awarded the Mudra Chandrak of Amreli, the Sahitya Setu Award from Kolkata for his novels, and the Critics Award for criticism. He also received an award for his works from the Gujarat Sahitya Akademi. He was awarded the Uma-Snehrashmi Prize (1994–95) for Ratvaso and the Ushnas Prize (1996–97) for Dungar Kori Ghar Karya, both from the Gujarati Sahitya Parishad. Patel has also received the Upendra Pandya Prize, the Kaka Saheb Kalelkar Prize, the Nanabhai Surati prize, the Harilal Desai Prize and the Joseph Macwan Prize.

== Personal life ==
He lives in Vallabh Vidyanagar. He married Gopi (born Ganga) in 1972, and they have two sons and a daughter.

== See also ==
- List of Gujarati-language writers
