= Gujarati Vishwakosh =

Gujarati encyclopedia series

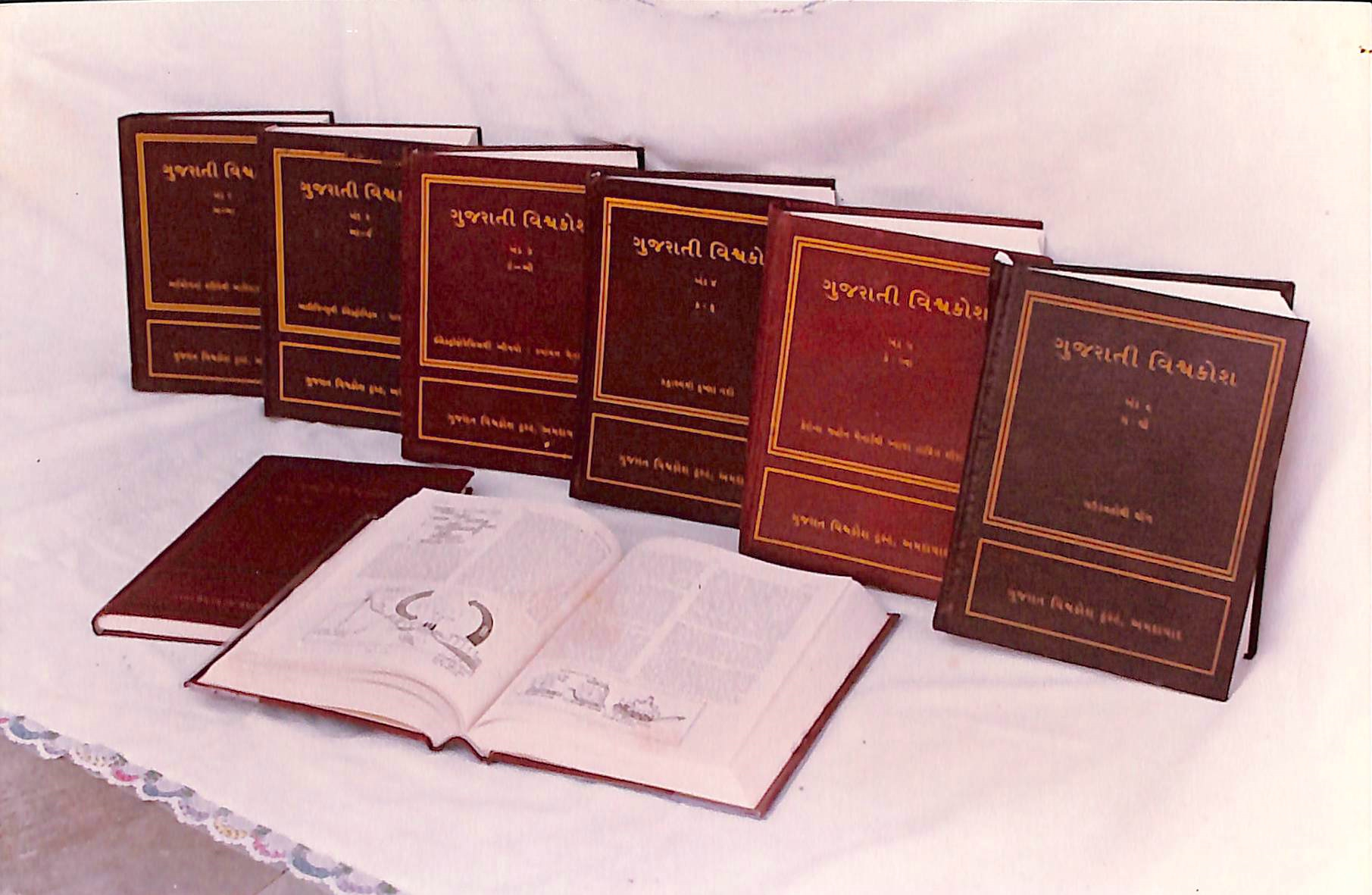
Volumes of Gujarati Vishwakosh

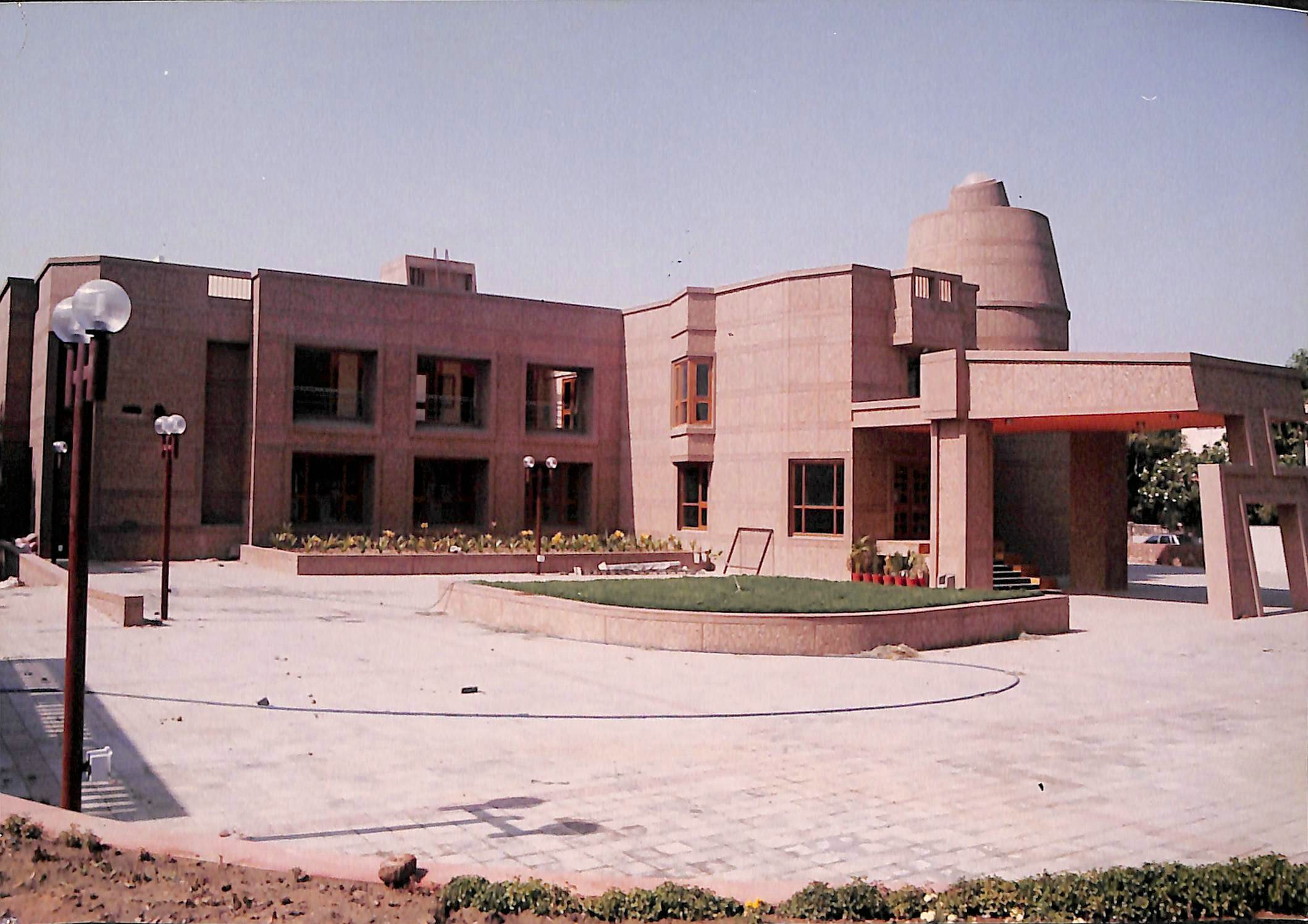
Gujarati Vishwakosh Trust Building

Gujarati Vishwakosh (Gujarati: ગુજરાતી વિશ્વકોશ; lit. 'Gujarati Encyclopedia') is an encyclopedia in Gujarati, one of the official languages of India, published by Gujarat Vishwakosh Trust, Ahmedabad, Gujarat, India. It can be considered the first full encyclopedia in the Gujarati language. Under the guidance of Dhirubhai Thaker, the work started in 1985 and ended in 2009 consisting of 25 volumes with 23,090 articles.

== History ==
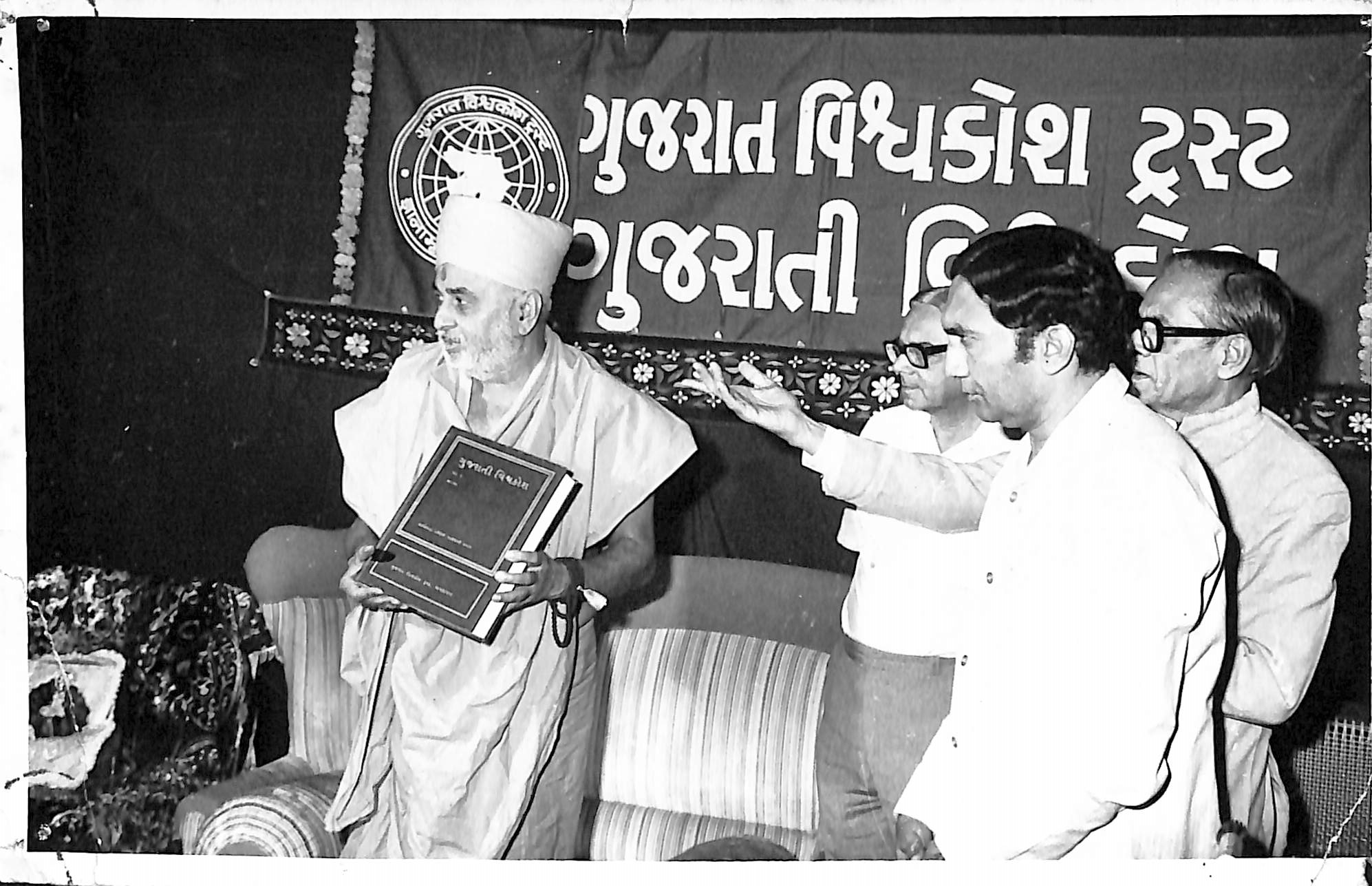
The first volume of Gujarati Vishwakosh was inaugurated by Pramukh Swami Maharaj; 2 December 1989

After the foundation of Gujarat state in 1960 on the linguistic basis, there was a need for literature available to the Gujarati speaking public. After years of efforts by Dhirubhai Thaker, the Gujarat Vishwakosh Trust was set up in December 1985 comprising many scholars and people of various disciplines. Work commenced to create this massive encyclopedia in 1985 under Gujarati writer Dhirubhai Thaker. The first concept was to create 20 volumes (with an additional introductory volume), but by its completion in 2009, the encyclopedia included 25 volumes, which comprised more than 23,000 articles.

The first volume of Gujarati Vishwakosh was released on 2 December 1989; inaugurated by Pramukh Swami Maharaj. It contains 1474 titles in all, with 491 entries in Humanities, 437 in Social science and 488 in Physical sciences and the rest on miscellaneous subjects. It has 53 monographs and 793 brief write-ups; the rest are articles of moderate size. It received co-operation of 365 contributors. The second was released on 7 October 1990. It runs into more than 1000 pages having 912 entries including 280 in Humanities, 285 in Social sciences an 347 in Physical sciences. It has 31 monographs of in-depth study. It received co-operation of 401 contributors. The 25th volume, last and final volume of Vishwakosh, was released on 15 December 2009.

The project which has finally cost ₹ 25 million was funded by donors. Social worker Sakarchand Patel was among the first donors.

== Content ==
The 25 volumes cover 23,090 articles written by 1,593 people. There are 7,965 articles on humanities; 7,935 on science; 7,190 on sociology. Of these 6,967 are biographies; 538 are large articles and 248 are translated articles. They also include 11,296 graphics and images. They totals more than 1,73,50,000 words. Each volume has more than thousand pages.

== Reception ==
Kumarpal Desai, managing trustee of Gujarat Vishwakosh Trust, told in 2010, "This was a noble task and a lot of hard work and dedication went into this enormous effort with support from hundreds of people. This is a 50th birthday gift to Gujarat."
