= Yogesh Joshi (poet) =

Indian Gujarati-language writer (Born: 1955)

- Born: Yogesh Bhanuprasad Joshi; 3 July 1955 (age 71); Mahesana, Gujarat, India
- Education: Master of Science
- Alma mater: Gujarat University
- Occupations: poet; short story writer; novelist; literary critic; editor
- Spouse: Rashmi Joshi (m. 1981)
- Writing career
- Language: Gujarati
- Years active: 1968–present
- Period: Postmodern Gujarati literature
- Notable awards: Narmad Suvarna Chandrak (1994–98); Dhanji Kanji Gandhi Suvarna Chandrak (1999); Ushnas Prize (2006-07)

Yogesh Bhanuprasad Joshi (born 3 July 1955) is an Indian Gujarati-language poet, short story writer, novelist, and editor from Gujarat, India. He edited Parab, an organ of Gujarati Sahitya Parishad, from 2003 to 2021. He was awarded the Narmad Suvarna Chandrak (1994–98) for his book Motiba.

== Early life ==
Yogesh Joshi was born on 3 July 1955 in Mahesana, Gujarat to Bhanuprasad Joshi and Anilabahen Joshi. He completed his schooling from G.D. High School Visnagar in 1971. He received his B. Sc. from M. N. College, Visnagar in 1974 and M. Sc. in Physics from the School of Sciences, Gujarat University in 1976.

Joshi married Rashmi on 22 January 1981. His son, Maulik Joshi, was born in 1981, and his daughter, Kruti, was born in 1984. He currently lives in Ahmedabad.

== Career ==
Joshi started his career as a junior engineer at the Department of Telecommunications, Government of India in 1979. In 2000, he joined Bharat Sanchar Nigam Limited and served there until 2015 as a sub-divisional and divisional engineer and then deputy general manager.

Joshi started to write poems during his school days. During college he ventured in to other genres of literature such as drama and short story. In 1976, his writing was published for the first time in Bhumika, a Gujarati literary magazine edited by Aniruddh Brahmbhatt which was later published as Kimapi. Since 2002, he has served as an editor of Parab, a publication of Gujarati Sahitya Parishad.

== Works ==
Avaajnu Ajavalu, his first anthology of poems, was published in 1984, followed by Tejna Chaas (1991). His first novel Samudi was published in 1984, followed by Jivtar (1987), Nahitar (1991), Aarpaar (1992), Vaastu (2001) and Bhina Pagla (2004). Hajiye Ketlun Door? (1993) and Adhakhuli Baari (2001) are his short stories collections while Motiba was a biography. His collection of essays was published as Antahpur in 2002. His selected short stories have been compiled as Yogesh Joshi Ni Shreshtha Vartao by Harsh Brahmbhatt and Urmila Thakar in 2008. Mrutyuni Samipe (1987) and Patangni Pankhe (1989) are his translations.

=== Children's works ===
- Patangni Pankhe (1989)
- Kesoodano Rang (1990)
- Rasaprad Bodhkathao (2001; Vol. 4 to 6)
- Ramayan Na Amar Patro (2002; Vol. 1 to 4)
- Mahabharat Na Amar Patro (2002; Vol. 1 to 5)
- Panchatantra (2002; Vol. 1 to 5)
- Hitopadesh (2002; Vol. 1 to 5)
- Isapniti (2002; Vol. 1 to 5)
- Tenaliram (2003; Vol. 1 to 6)
- Mulla Nasruddin (2003; Vol. 1 to 5)
- Vikram-Vetal (2004; Vol. 1 to 5)
- Sinhasan Batrisi (2005; Vol. 1 to 5)

=== Compilations ===
- Gurjar Adyatan Kavyasanchay (1998; with Chandrakant Sheth and Shraddha Trivedi)
- Gurjar Geetsanchay (1998; with Chandrakant Sheth and Shraddha Trivedi)
- Gurjar Pranay Kavyasanchay (1998; with Chandrakant Sheth and Shraddha Trivedi)
- Gurjar Ghazalsanchay (1998; with Chandrakant Sheth)
- Gujarati Navlikachayan : 1999 (2001; selected short stories published during the year)
- Vismi Sadini Gujarati Kavyamudra (2007; with Chandrakant Sheth, Harsh Brahmbhatt and Urmila Thakar)

== Recognition ==
He won Narmad Suvarna Chandrak (1994–98) for his book Motiba. His short story collections Hajiye Ketlun Door (1993) and Adhakhuli Baari (2001) have been awarded by Gujarat Sahitya Akademi. He won the Govardhanram Tripathi Prize, Ghanshyamdas Saraf Sahitya Puraskar and Gujarat Sahitya Akademi Best Book Prize for his novel Vaastu. Vaastu was also awarded the Priyakant Parikh Prize of Gujarati Sahitya Parishad in 2001. His essay collection Antahpur (2002) was awarded by Kalagurjari Sanstha, Mumbai. His work Jesalmer (series of poems) was awarded the Ushnas Prize (2006–07). He is also a recipient of Dhanji Kanji Gandhi Suvarna Chandrak (1999).

== See also ==
- List of Gujarati-language writers
