= Jayant Kothari =

Gujarati literary critic (1930-2001)

- Born: Jayant Sukhlal Kothari; 28 January 1930; Rajkot, Gujarat
- Died: 1 April 2001 (aged 71); Ahmedabad, Gujarat
- Education: Master of Arts; Diploma in Linguistics
- Alma mater: Dharamsinhji College
- Occupation: literary critic
- Writing career
- Language: Gujarati
- Notable work: Vankdekha Vivechano (1993)
- Notable awards: Sahitya Akademi Award (1998), refused

Jayant Sukhlal Kothari was a Gujarati literary critic from India.

== Life ==
Jayant Kothari was born on 28 January 1930 at Rajkot. He completed his primary and secondary education in Rajkot. He matriculated in 1948. He completed BA in Gujarati and Sanskrit from Dharamsinhji College in 1957 and MA in 1959. He obtained Diploma in Linguistics from Gujarat University in 1977.

He ran cutlery shop in Rajkot from 1949 to 1954 and also served as Railway Claims agent. He taught at Prakash Arts College, Ahmedabad from 1959 to 1962. He taught Gujarati at various colleges of Gujarat Law Society from 1962 to his retirement. He co-edited the first volume of Gujarati Sahitya Kosh (Encyclopedia of Gujarati Literature; (1989), prepared by Gujarati Sahitya Parishad, with Jayant Gadit. He died on 1 April 2000 in Ahmedabad.

== Works ==
His Bharatiya Kavya Siddhant (1960) with Natubhai Rajpariya is an important reference work. Plato-Aristotle ni Kavyavicharna (1969) is his work on study of western poetics. He also included study of Longinus in subsequent edition of it. Upakram (1969) gained him reputation as a critic. Anukram (1975) is criticism of eight akhyanas of Premanand Bhatt, works of Akha Bhagat and some modern literary works. Vivechan nu Vivechan (1976) is criticism of critical works in Gujarati literature which included long article on history of criticism in Gujarati as well as criticism of seven modern critical works. Anushang (1978) includes study articles on themes in literature. Vyasang (1984) includes articles on forms of essays, short stories and one-act plays. Narsinh Mehtana Pado: Nava Pariprekshyama (2004) has study articles on works of Narsinh Mehta in which he had questioned authorship of some works. It also includes his lectures delivered at Saurashtra University in 1995. His other works of criticism and research are Shanshodhan ane Parikshan, Aswad Ashtadashi, Sahityik Tathyoni Mavjat (1989), Kavyachhta, Sanskrit Kavyashastrani Adhunik Krutivivechanma Prastutata, Kavilokma, Navallokma, Akhana Chhappa: Ketlok Arthvistar.

Sahityik Tathyoni Mavjat (1989) includes his research and study of medieval works, other literary studies and criticism of other reference works like Jain Gurjar Kavio and Gujarati Sahitya Suchi (Madhyakal). It also includes his experiences of working as a critic, editor and researcher. Vankdekha Vivechano (1993) is his truthful critical work.

He had started a series of studies for students of literature. It included edited books of criticism on different forms of Gujarati literature. Tunki Varta ane Gujarati Tunki Varta (on short stories, 1977), Nibandh ane Gujarati Nibandh (on essays, 1976), Ekanki ane Gujarati Ekanki (on one-act plays, 1980) were published under this series. Bhasha Parichay ane Gujarati Bhashanu Swarup (1973) is a textbook introducing Gujarati language widely. He had briefly served as a president of Gujarati Adhyapak Sangh where he edited and published presidential lectures of past 25 years under Adheet which continued as annual publication ever since. Sudamacharit (1967), Kant Vishe (1983), Jain Gurjar Kavio (1987), Meghani Vivechanasandoh Vol. I-II and Narsinh Padmala are his other edited and co-edited works.

== Awards ==
He was awarded Sahitya Akademi Award in 1998 for his work Vankdekha Vivechano but he did not accept it.

Awards
Preceded by Ashokpuri Goswami	Recipient of the Sahitya Akademi Award winners for Gujarati; 1998	Succeeded by Niranjan Bhagat
