= Rasbihari Desai =

Gujarati vocalist and composer (1935–2012)

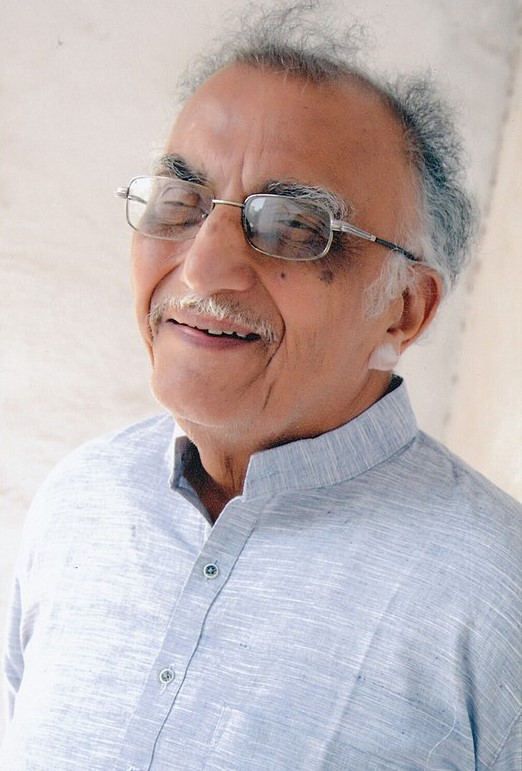
- Born: 23 June 1935; Patan, Gujarat
- Died: 6 October 2012 (aged 77); Ahmedabad
- Education: MSc. Physics
- Occupations: Professor of Physics, music composer, vocalist
- Years active: 1954–2012
- Spouse: Vibha Desai

Signature
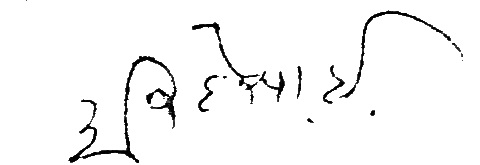

Rasbihari Desai (23 June 1935 – 6 October 2012), also known as Rasbhai, was a vocalist and composer of Gujarati and Hindi songs. He was also a Professor of physics.

== Early life ==
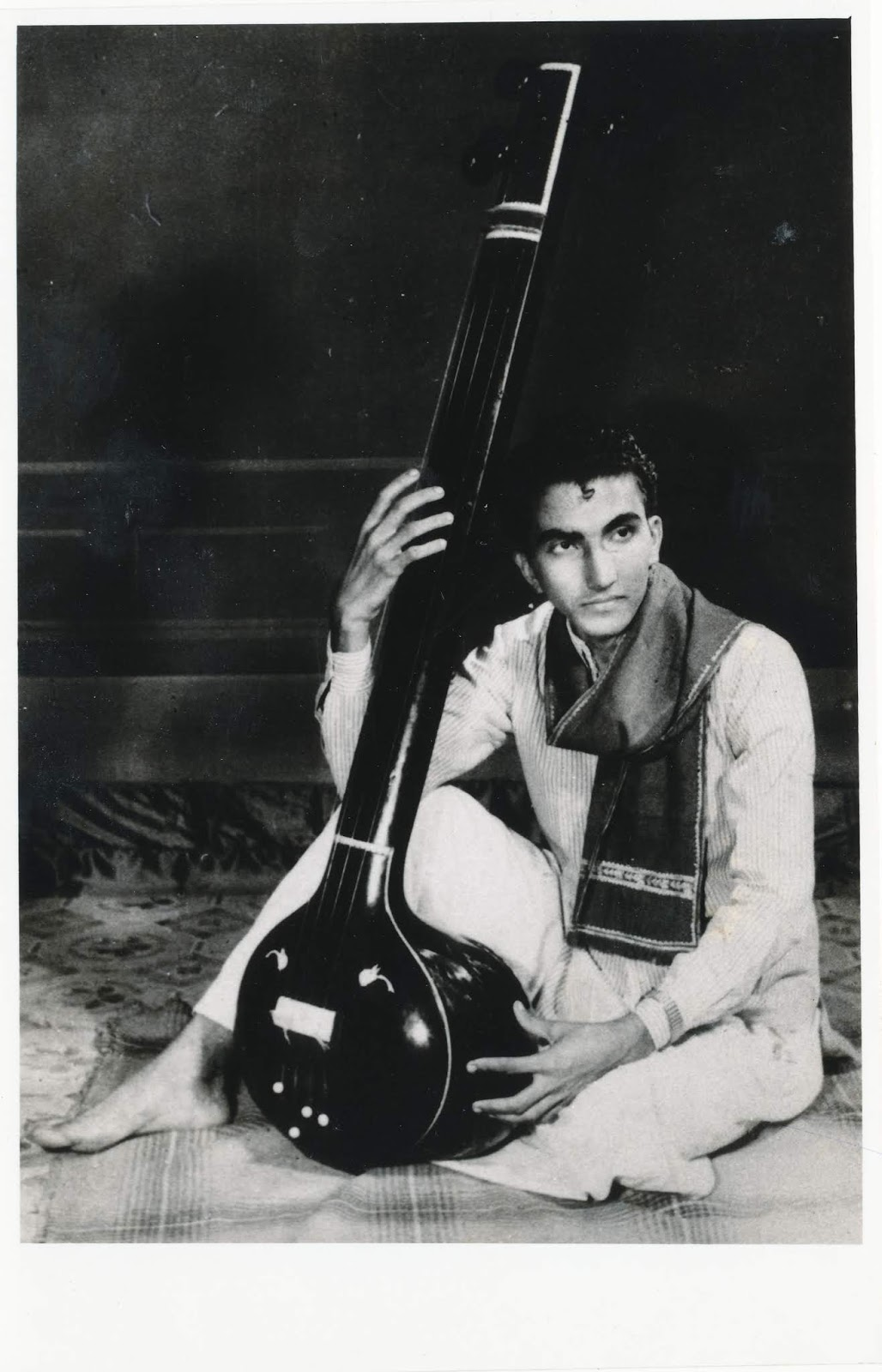
Young Rasbihari Desai

He was born to Durgaba and Ramanlal Desai from a Nagar family in Patan (North Gujarat). His grandmother Mahalaxmiben used to sing Ramcharitmanas. His father, Ramanbhai, was a singer of repute as well.

He was married in 1964 to Vibha, who was recognized as a national-level singer by All India Radio (AIR). She went on to receive the Best Female Playback Singer Award (1989) for the film Kashino Dikro.

They collectively performed more than 1,000 times both in Gujarat and internationally.

== Career ==
At age 19, Rasbihari became an AIR-approved vocalist in light music, a recognition that eventually reached top-grade status. AIR, and later Doordarshan, regularly invited him to concerts all over India.

Throughout his academic career as a professor of physics, his students frequently secured top positions at both the university and national levels.

At numerous music-orientation camps and workshops organized by the Gujarat University and the Government of Gujarat to mentor aspiring singers, he followed the traditional indigenous method of imparting training in music. Pranayama, dhyana, breath-controlling exercises, prayers, poetry recitation, and appreciation, a scientific approach to developing voice culture and an emphasis on experiencing the divine through it were integral to his interactive music sessions. He conducted such lecture demonstrations and workshops in the United Kingdom and the United States as well. Similar to ancient parampara, a few students in his lifetime stayed with his family, observed and emulated his lifestyle, and learned music in the spirit of a sadhana.

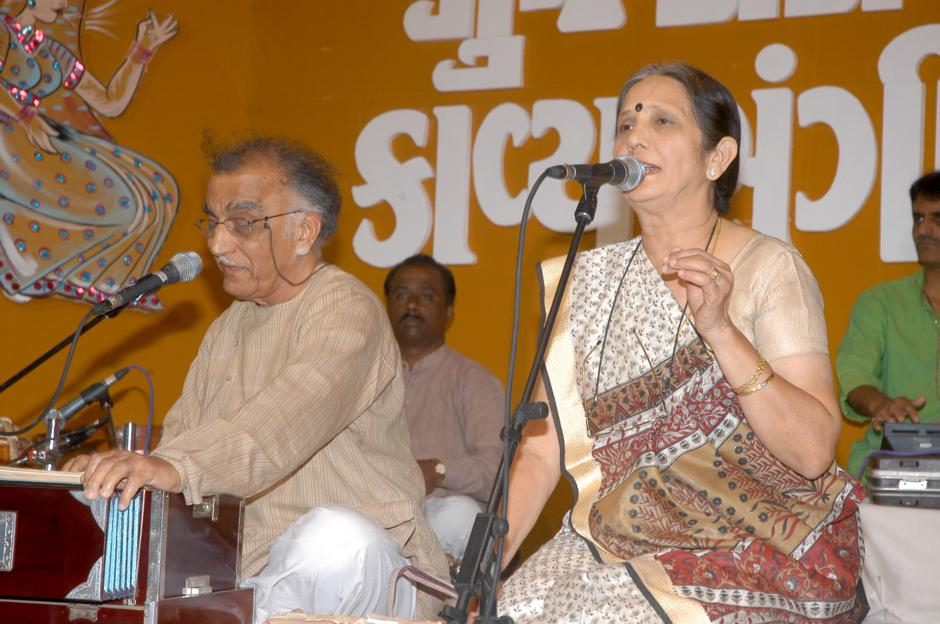
Performing with wife Vibha Desai

=== Shruti Vrunda ===
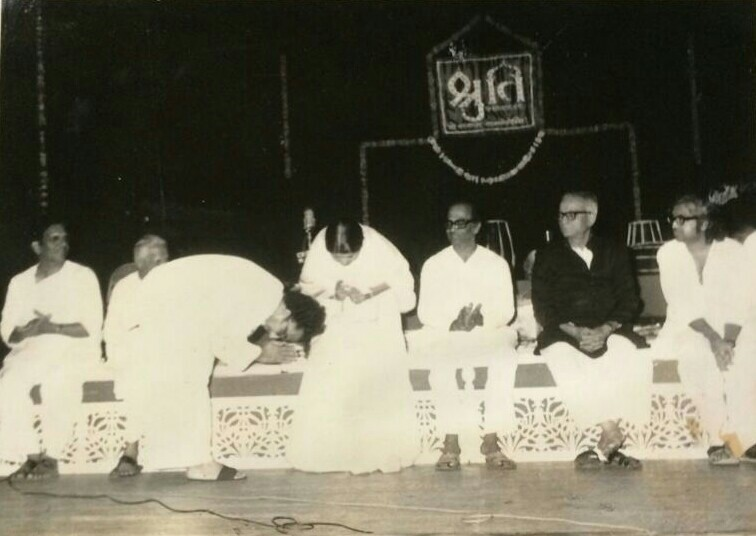
Desai in the program of "Shruti" before music stalwarts like Lataji, Salil Chaudhary and Hridaynath Mangeshkar

Rasbihari Desai was instrumental in the formation of Shruti, a group of non-professional, proficiently trained singers, which over time emerged as the benchmark in group singing with a fragrance of the soil in the songs and a refreshing spontaneity in rendering them.

For over 40 years, Shruti gave more than 300 performances in Gujarat, Mumbai, Delhi, Nagpur, Kolkata, and other places. Music maestros like Lata Mangeshkar, Hridaynath Mangeshkar, Salil Chaudhary, Madan Mohan, Manna Dey, Mohammed Rafi, Laxmikant Pyarelal and Avinash Vyas were among those who highly commended Shruti's significant tenacious endeavor.

=== Bhavan's Sangeet Vibhag ===
At the instance of Kanaiyalal Munshi, a leading author, a political leader, and the founder of Bharatiya Vidya Bhavan, Rasbihari Desai consented to be the mentor of Bhavan's Sangeet Vibhag in 1967 and continued the activity consistently for over 43 years. Under his guidance, he made a significant impact on Gujarati Kavya Sangeet and choir singing. He instilled in his students—regardless of their vocal differences or varying skill levels—a deep sense of dedication to music and humility, encouraging them to set aside individual identities for the group's growth.

=== Thought-provoking lectures-demonstrations and articles ===
Rasbihari Desai enhanced Gujarati Kavya Sangeet not only through his voice and compositions but also through his lectures, demonstrations, and articles. He was invited to deliver speeches, lectures, and demonstrations at various seminars, conferences, and workshops on music. His conceptual articles were published in many newspapers and magazines.

=== Lecture demonstrations / workshops/seminars ===
1. In M.S. University, Baroda on "Kavya Sangeet"
2. In the University of Texas at Austin, USA on "Characteristics of Indian Music"
3. Invited by All India Radio, Ahmedabad to deliver a lecture in a 'Workshop On Indian Music' to the Program- Executives/ Composers from various AIR stations in Gujarat, Rajasthan, Madhya Pradesh, Uttar Pradesh & Haryana in September 2005
4. Organized & conducted Gujarat State Sugam Sangeet Conferences since 1971
5. Conducted more than 20, ten days of intensive orientation music camps(Shibirs) of Gujarat State Government Youth Board and Gujarat University
6. A Sanskrit Shloka-Mantra Gaan Workshop for Gujarat University students

=== Articles/publications in music ===
1. Article published in "Kumar" monthly in 1967
2. "Music in Gujarat": an extensive survey article in the 13th Anniversary Supplement of The Times of India on 9 February 1981
3. "Music - A Kaleidoscopic View": an article in The Times of India Annual Supplement
4. A series of 3 articles in the reputed Daily Gujarat Samachar London Edition
5. Articles on "Musical Bird-Calls" in the Gujarati magazine "Kumar" in October 2001 & Hindi magazine "Sangeet", Hathras, Uttar Pradesh in December 2004

== End of life ==
Rasbhai was precise and kept a low profile in speaking and writing. The books he read, and he read many, reflected his ardent love for music and spiritual explorations. Shri Dhyani Maharaj Madhusudandasji was his spiritual Guru. He thought himself fortunate to be in live touch with enlightened personalities like Shri Chidanandaji of Shivananda Ashram, Pramukhswami Maharaj and Shri Vimlatai Thakar through correspondence. All said, music remained an instrument of a spiritual ascent to him. Spirituality was nurtured in him since childhood by his aunt, Nirmalaben Desai, who used to tell him inspiring stories from Indian scripture. His young inquisitive eyes also witnessed some such incidents that cannot be interpreted by mere intellect. The imprints of these childhood memories evoked an urge in him to seek the infinite.

Some of the experiences Rasbihari himself recounted go beyond spirituality and have an element of mysticism about them.

Before his marriage, he had spent two days working on a cloud chamber experiment in the darkroom of the physics lab, at Gujarat College. It is difficult to say when and how he slipped from the domain of physics to spirituality. His associates claim that he did. It was believed that his consciousness merged with the universal consciousness.

On his return on the evening of 27 May 1964, he explained his absence for two days to the worried family and added that in the state of meditation, he had an intuitive communication that the then Prime Minister of India Pandit Jawaharlal Nehru had died and it indeed was true.

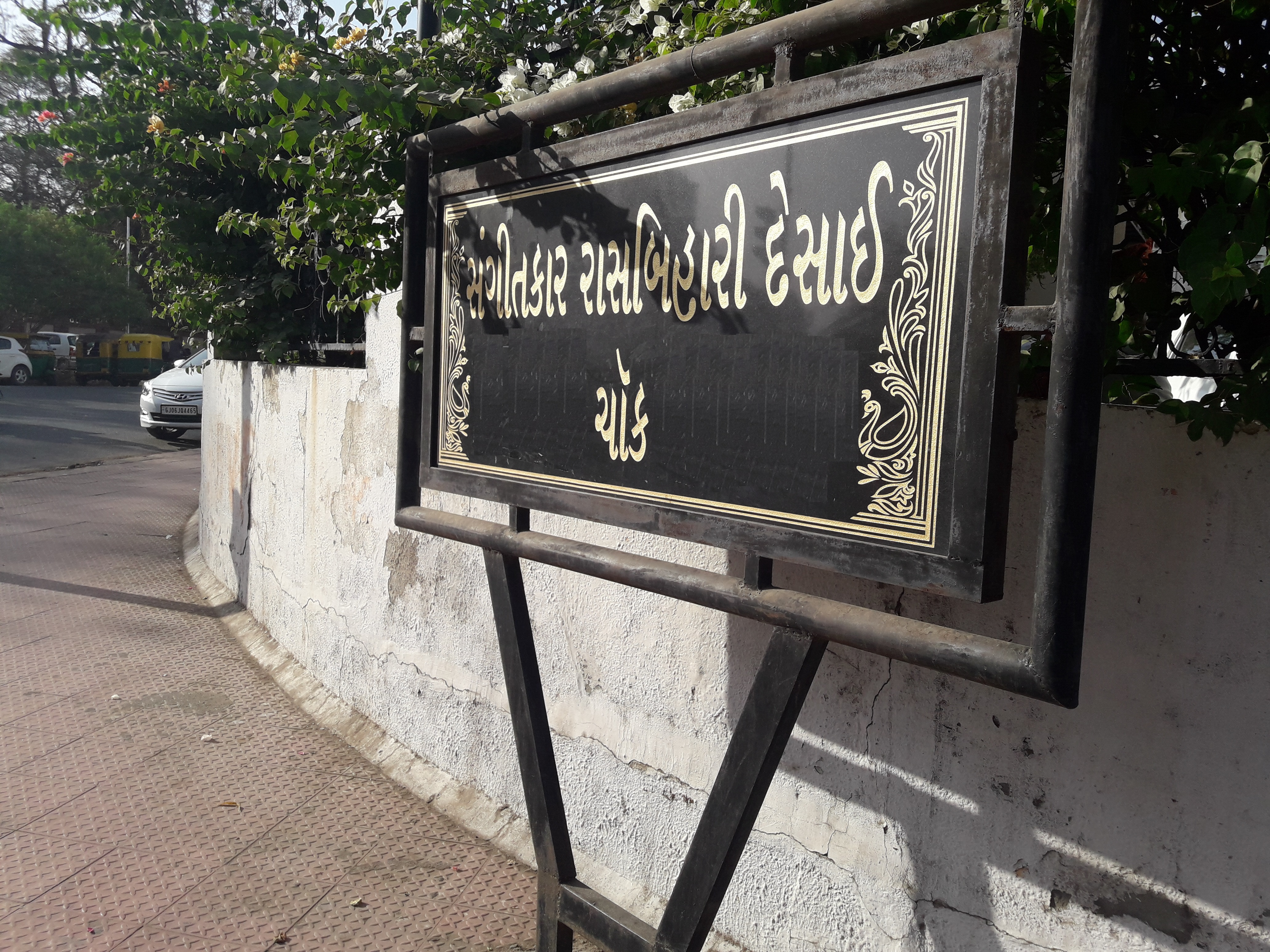

Another such incident took place in 2007, when while singing in his Pooja room, he heard a voice, different from his voice. The immense melody of that divine and blissful voice was so overwhelming that he could not help but pray to the Almighty to cease his own voice so that only the divine voice could be heard forever.

Rasbhai died on 6 October 2012. The then Chief Minister of Gujarat Shri Narendra Modi along with the renowned personalities from the field of literature and music expressed deep shock and grief. Both electronic and print media paid him significant tribute. The Chief Minister wrote on Twitter, “We will miss the eminent singer, and composer Shri Rasbihari Desai who made invaluable contribution to Gujarati music. May his soul rest in peace.”

A Parichay Pustika by Image Publication titled Rasbihari Desai written by Margi Hathi was released by Shri Morari Bapu in the inaugural ceremony of Kavya Sangeet Samaroh- 2013 jointly organized by Gujarat Samachar and Samanvay.

A place near his residence is named "Sangeetkar Rasbihari Desai Chowk" by the Ahmedabad Municipal Corporation as a mark of respect for his contribution to Gujarati Kavya Sangeet.

An Award has been floated in his memory since 2014. Sangat Prerit Shri Rasbihari Desai Sanman is conferred every year to a prominent Gujarati Singer in Anushthan, a concert of Gujarati music.

== Awards and accolades ==
=== Recognition ===
- Recognized as best playback singer in the Gujarati film Kashino Dikro by the Government of Gujarat in 1979
- Awarded honorary membership of Gujarati Association of Detroit of United States for remarkable contribution to the field of music in 1981
- 'Triveni' award by Triveni Vadodara for outstanding contribution to music in 1984
- Gaurav Puraskar by the Govt of Gujarat for the year 1991–92
- 'Anart' Award by Mehsana (5 northern districts of Gujarat State) in 1995
- Vishishta Dirgha Prasaran Seva Award (since 1954) by All India Radio in 1998
- Inclusion as a couple in the first 100 leading personalities of Gujarat declared by the reputed daily Divya Bhaskar
- 'Hridayasth Avinash Vyas Sugam Sangeet Award' inspired by Morari Bapu in February 2012
- Felicitated as a Couple for the remarkable contribution in Gujarati Sugam Sangeet by the Municipal Corporation, Ahmedabad in 2012

=== Achievements ===
- Lead singer in 15 musical ballets produced by All India Radio, Ahmedabad from 1959 to 1983
- Co-organiser of music conferences under the auspices of Bhartiya Vidya Bhavan, Mumbai from 1960 to 1966
- Lead singer in 18 dance ballets in various academic institutions from 1960 to 1980
- Professor in charge of Gujarat University cultural team which visited Indore & Ujjain Universities, Madhya Pradesh in 1971; Kurukshetra & Hissar Universities, Haryana in 1972 & Karnataka & Mysore Universities, Mysore in 1973
- Participated in National seminar on musicology with special reference to 'Musical Scales', sponsored by Central Sangeet Natak Academy, Delhi in collaboration with the Department of Physics & Department of Music, University of Madras 26 to 28 February 1979
- Represented Gujarat University as an observer in International Seminar on 'Indian Music Insight' at Bhopal 27 to 30 September 1983
- Given lectures in the Center for Developmental Communications, Gujarat University on the subject 'Bhartiya Sangeet Parampara' in 1984–1985
- Presented light music in 'Lata Mangeshkar Puraskar Alankaran Samaroh' on invitation by Madhya Pradesh Government, held on 3 February 1988
- Conducted 25 music orientation camps (Shibirs) / Sammelans of Gujarat University students & winners of the Gujarat State Youth Festival
- Nominated by the Director General, All India Radio, New Delhi to be a member of the Local Audition Committee (Folk & Light Music) in February 2005 for two years.

== Discs and albums ==
- Mandava-ni- jui (His Master's Voice, first-ever Trio with Purushottam Upadhyay & Pinakin Mehta)
- Shravan Madhuri (LP record of Shruti vrund - His Master's Voice)
- Ne Tame Yaad Aavyan - (LP Record)
- Bilipatra- Trinetra (Sanskrit CD Album)
- Radha Madhav Leela Gaan, Atma Nivedan (Hindi Devotionals - CD Albums)
- Ashram Bhajanavali (Devotional Album)
- Keertan Mala (Devotional Album)
- Ame komal komal (CD Album)
- Kashi- no- Dikro (CD Album - Gujarati Movie)
- Leeludi Dharati (CD Album - Gujarati Movie)
- Hothal Padamani (CD Album- Gujarati Movie)
- Sayujya (2 CD Album)
- Sangeet- Sudha (CD Album)
- Shiv- Mahimna - Vishnu Sahasra Naam (CD Album)
- Guru Ne Baat Sunaya (Kabirvani)
- Anahad Na Ajwala (CD Album) (His Compositions)
- Smaran Na Ajwala (CD Album) (His Compositions)
