= Niranjan Bhagat =

Indian Gujarati-language poet (1826–2018)

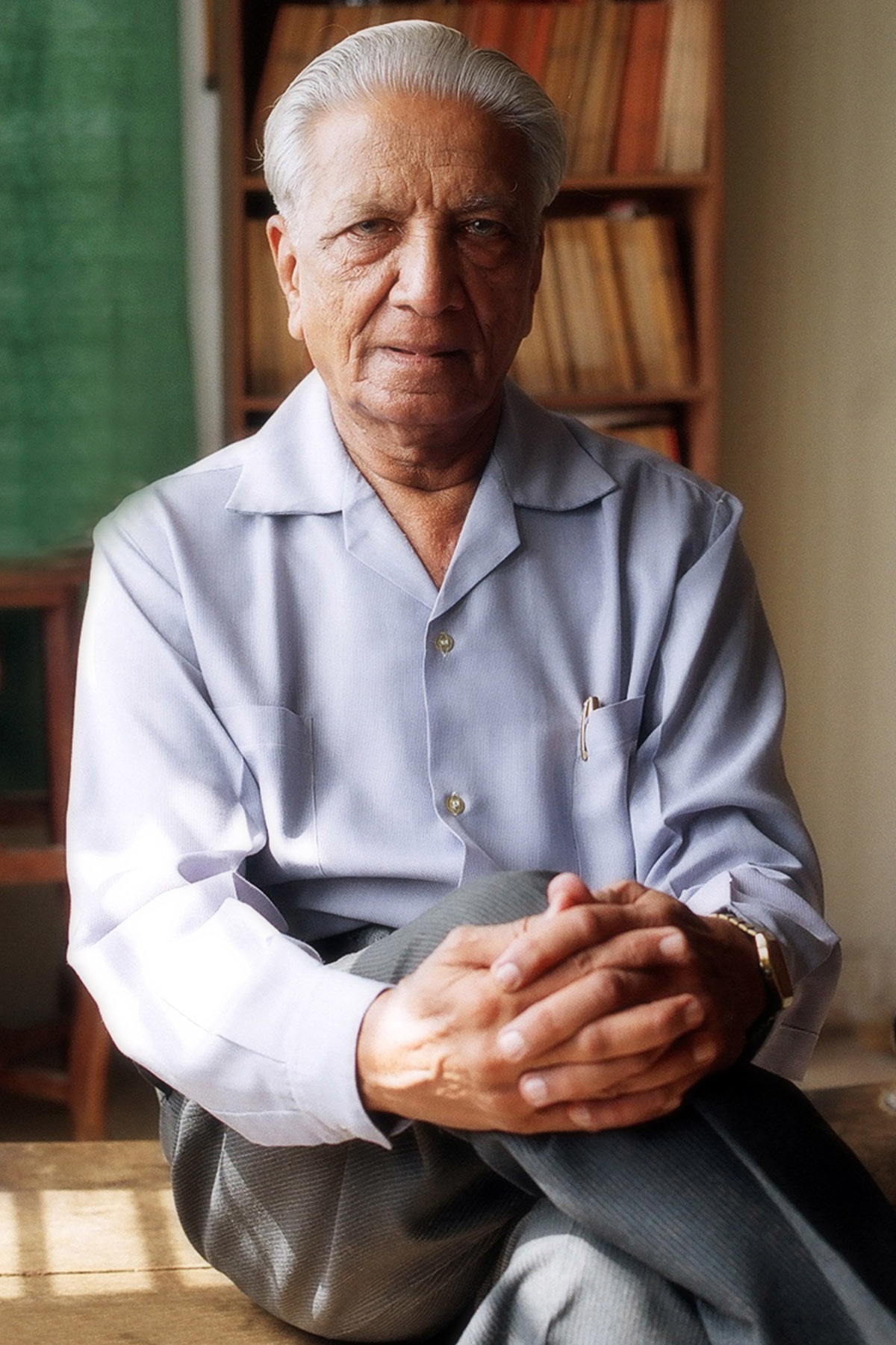
- Bhagat at his residence in Ahmedabad, 2005
- Born: 18 May 1926; Ahmedabad, Bombay Presidency, British India
- Died: 1 February 2018 (aged 91); Ahmedabad, India
- Occupations: Poet, essayist, critic, editor
- Writing career
- Language: Gujarati, English
- Notable work: Pravaldvip
- Notable awards: Sahitya Academy Award (1999)
- Niranjan Bhagat's voice Speech on Charles Baudelaire
- Website: Official website

Niranjan Narhari Bhagat (18 May 1926 – 1 February 2018) was an Indian Gujarati language poet, critic and translator who won the 1999 Sahitya Akademi Award for Gujarati language for his critical work Gujarati Sahiyta – Purvardha Uttarardha. He was also an English poet, and had written over a hundred poems in English, most being written in the style of Gitanjali.

== Early life ==
Niranjan Narhari Bhagat was born on 18 May 1926 in Ahmedabad. He completed M.A. in English Literature in 1950.

== Career ==
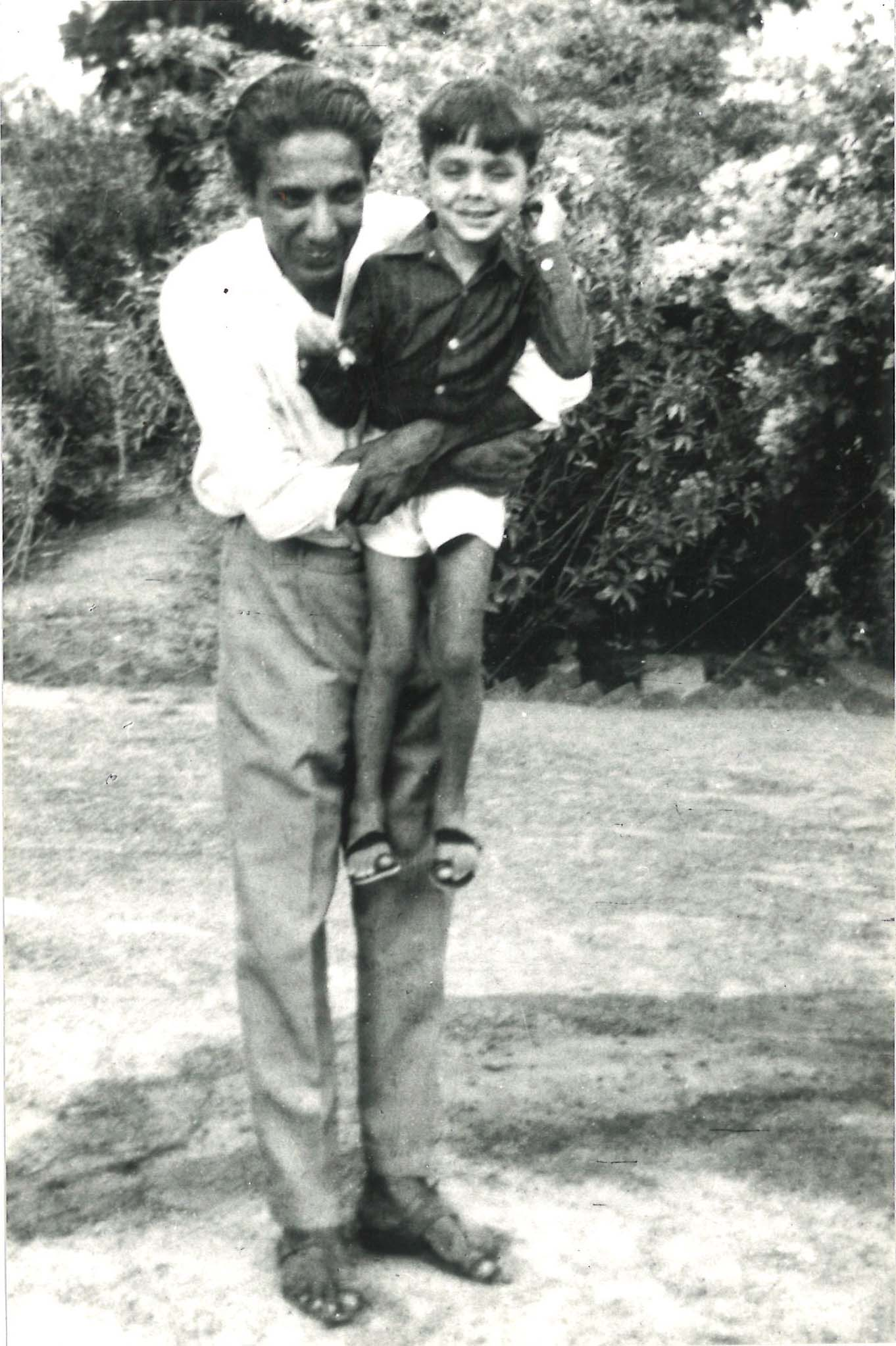
Niranjan Bhagat with child Amitabh Madia, son of Chunilal Madia, 1971

Bhagat joined L. D. Arts College as a lecturer. Later he joined Saint Xavier's College, Ahmedabad, as a professor of English in 1975 and served there until his retirement. He served as the president of Gujarati Sahitya Parishad in 1997–98. He also served as a member of Advisory Board for Gujarati, Sahitya Akademi, Delhi, from 1963 to 1968.

He received Narmad Suvarna Chandrak in 1953 for his book Chhandolay and Sahitya Akademi Award in 1999 for his critical work Gujarati Sahiyta – Purvardha Uttarardha. He also received Kumar Suvarna Chandrak in 1949, Ranjitram Suvarna Chandrak in 1969, Premanand Suvarna Chandrak in 1998, Sachchidanand Sanman in 2000 and the Narsinh Mehta Award in 2001.

== Death ==
Bhagat died of a stroke on 1 February 2018 at a hospital in Ahmedabad at the age of 91.

== See also ==
- List of Sahitya Akademi Award winners for Gujarati
- List of Gujarati-language writers

Awards
Preceded by Jayant Kothari	Recipient of the Sahitya Akademi Award winners for Gujarati; 1999	Succeeded by Vinesh Antani
