= Swapnatirtha =

1979 Gujarati novel by Radheshyam Sharma

- Cover page
- Author: Radheshyam Sharma
- Original title: સ્વપ્નતીર્થ
- Language: Gujarati
- Genre: novel
- Published: 1979
- Publisher: R. R. Sheth & Co., Mumbai
- Publication place: India
- Media type: Print
- Pages: 174
- OCLC: 5945871
- Dewey Decimal: 891.473
- Preceded by: Fero (1968)

Swapnatirtha (Gujarati: સ્વપ્નતીર્થ) is a Gujarati novel by Radheshyam Sharma. It was published in 1979 and made a great impact on Gujarati novels.

== Characters ==
- Navin - a young adolescent gullible boy
- Shanta - Navin's mother
- Vinayak kaka - Navin's uncle
- Ghanshyamlalji Maharaj - a Hindu priest
- Bhalubhai Sanghvi and Sohanbhai - two persons of pilgrimage with whom Navin gets homosexual relationship

== Plot ==
It is the story of an adolescent gullible boy Navin who being a religious one, pilgrims with a congregation on foot to a shrine of Vaishnava cult. His father Mathurdas's death is doubtful and his mother Shanta is illicitly connected with another two persons, first is his uncle Vinayak kaka, who visit their home frequently and second is Dharmaguru Ghanshyam Maharaj. These are the essential elements that interlace the plot of father-son relationship in the end. A dream follows the descriptions of each day in the diary.

== Format ==
The novel runs on three levels: the subtle voice of the narrator, image-full dream sequence of the young boy and the flat monotonous repetitive and school-age tone of his diary. The techniques of dream sequence and dream vision are used in this novel. The prose of the novel is rough and boring.

== Criticism ==
Jayant Gadit wrote that, the novel does not gives us the complete story but it centered around the consciousness of Navin, a main protagonist of the novel. Pravin Darji noted this novel for its prominent prose.
