= Harsh Brahmbhatt =

Indian Gujarati language poet and writer (Born: 1954)

- હર્ષ વાડીલાલ બ્રહ્મભટ્ટ
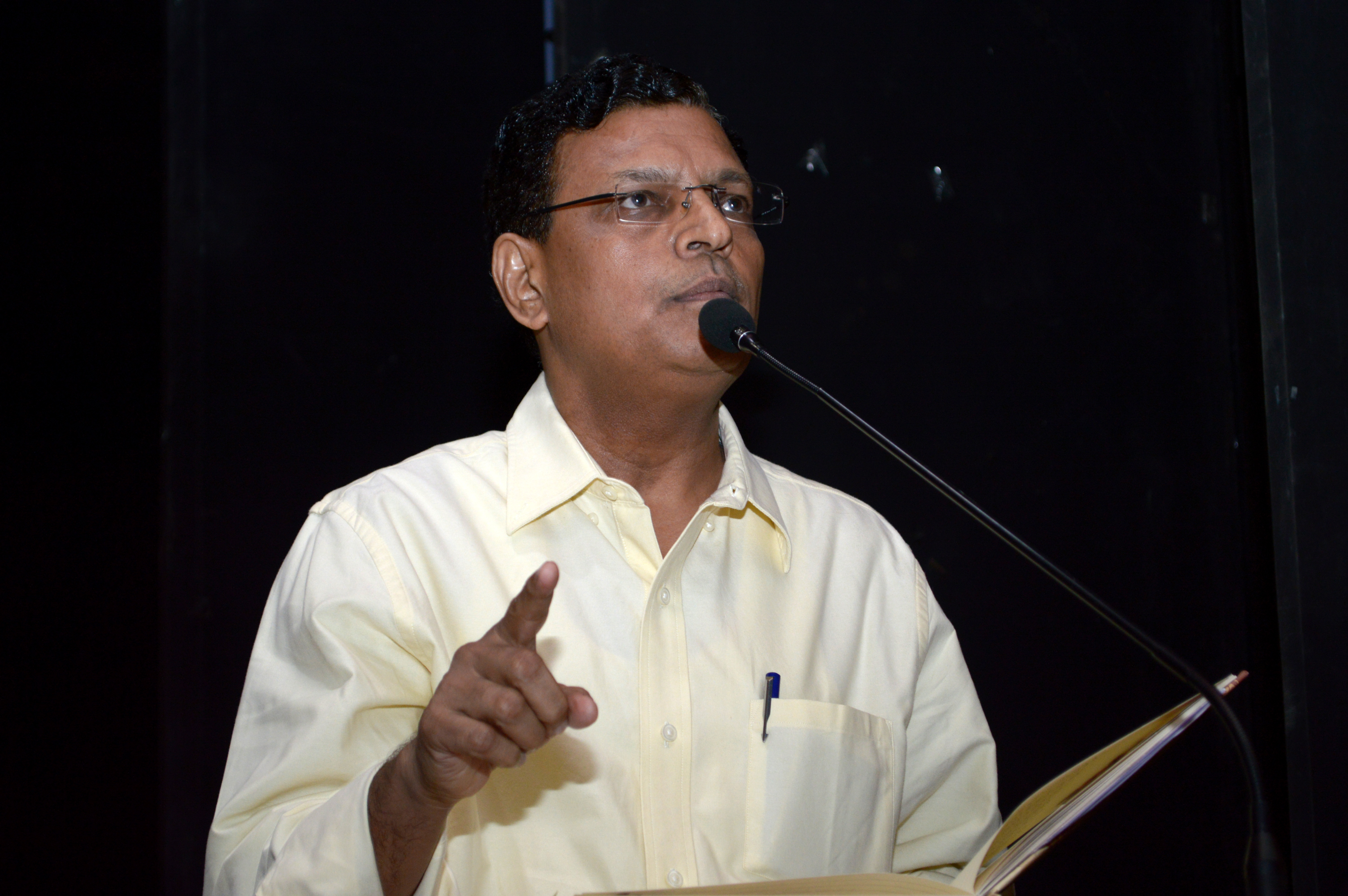
- at Gujarati Sahitya Parishad, June 2016
- Born: Harsh Vadilal Brahmbhatt; 31 July 1954 (age 72); Mahesana, Gujarat, India
- Education: Gujarat University
- Occupations: Poet and writer
- Writing career
- Language: Gujarati, Urdu
- Notable works: Jivavano Riaz (2010); Jhakal Ne Tadka Ni Vachche
- Notable awards: Shayda Award (2010); Kalapi Award (2012); Uma-Snehrashmi Prize (2012-2013); Kumar Suvarna Chandrak (2015); Dhanji Kanji Gandhi Suvarna Chandrak (2015)

Signature
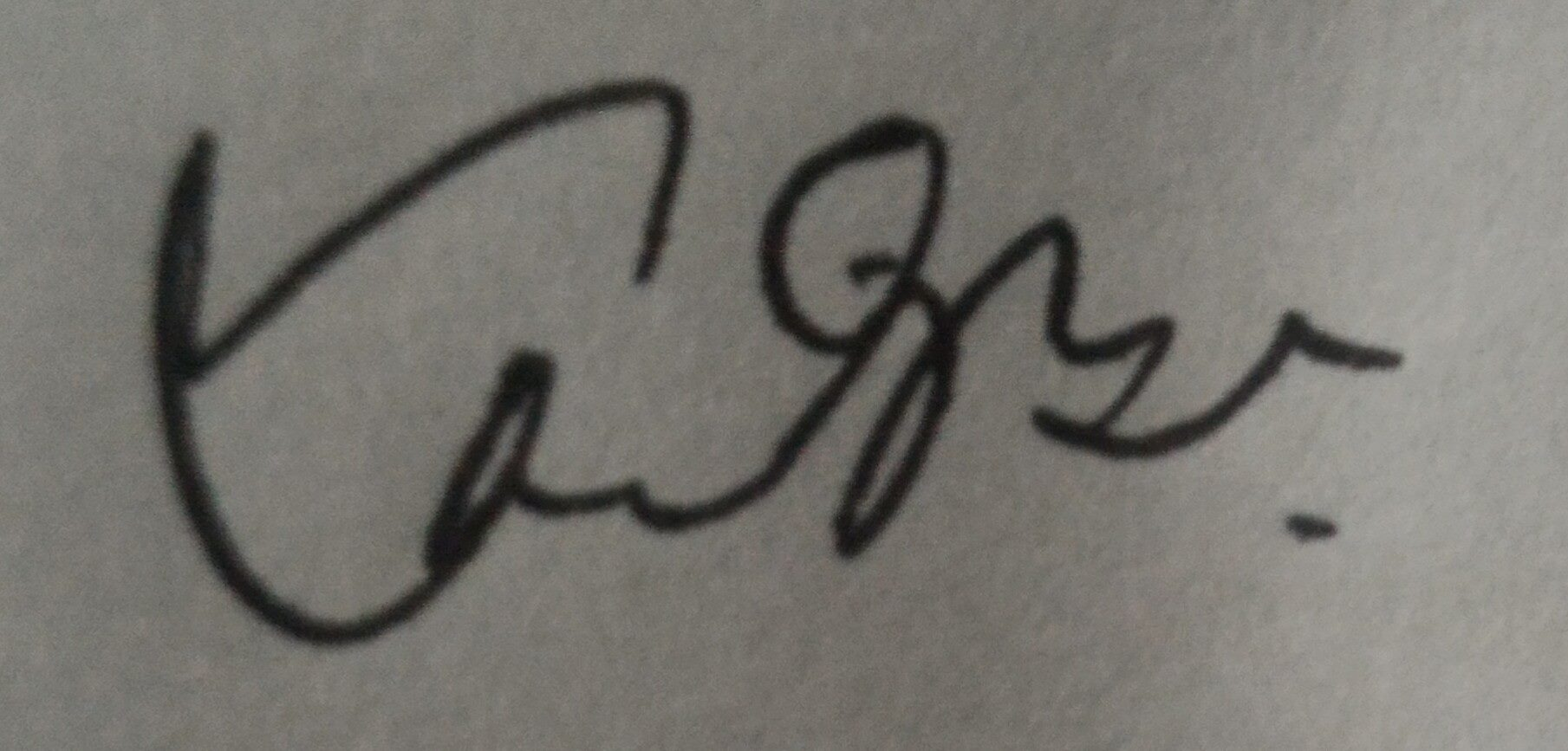

Harsh Brahmbhatt (born 1954) is a Gujarati language poet and writer from Gujarat, India. He has also made significant contributions to the Urdu ghazal form. He is a recipient of several awards, including the Shayda Award, Kalapi Award, Kumar Suvarna Chandrak and Dhanji Kanji Gandhi Suvarna Chandrak.

== Early life ==
Brahmbhatt was born on 31 July 1954 in Mahesana, Gujarat, to Vadilal and Sushila Brahmbhatt. He completed his Bachelor of Science in 1975 and Master of Science in 1977 from the Gujarat University, Ahmedabad, with Physics as one of his subjects.

== Career ==
He served as an additional secretary of Gujarat government and then as an additional secretary of the Chief Minister of Gujarat. He retired in July 2014. Presently, he serves as an advisor in Reliance Industries Ltd.

== Works ==
Ekalta Ni Bheedman (2012), his first anthology of ghazal, was published in 1992, followed by Andar Diwadandi (2002), Maun Ni Mahefil (2009), Jivavano Riaz (2010), Khud Ne Ya Kyan Malyo Chu? (2012), Jhakal Ne Tadka Ni Vachche and Aabh Doryu To Surya Ugyo'to. His collection of Urdu ghazals includes Kandil (1998), Sargoshi (2004), Mera Apna Aasman (2011), Khamoshi Hain Ibadat (2013) and Manzilo Ko Hatake Chalte Hain. Kodiyaman Petavi Raat (2015) is his collection of short poetry and free verse.

Some of his Urdu ghazals have been sung by Ustad Rashid Khan, Ustad Ahmed and Mohammed Hussain, Hariharan, Sonu Nigam, Kavita Krishnamurthy, Arijit Singh, Javed Ali, Anup Jalota, Bhupinder Singh, Mitali Mukherjee and the Shyamal-Saumil Munshi brothers. His Gujarati ghazals have had been sung with musical accompaniment composed by the singers Purushottam Upadhyay, Parthiv Gohil, Sadhana Sargam, Ashit and Hema Desai, Aalap Desai, the Shyamal-Saumil Munshi brothers, Naynesh Jani and Bhupinder Singh.

He has edited several books, including Vismi Sadini Gujarati Kavya Mudra (with Chandrakant Sheth, Yogesh Joshi and Urmila Thaker), Best of Miskin (2013; selected ghazals of Rajesh Vyas 'Miskin', Shabda Sathe Maro Sambandh (2013; with Anil Chavda), Yogesh Joshini Shreshtha Vartao (2008; with Urmila Thakar; selected short stories of Yogesh Joshi), Maru Satya (2006; with Ankit Trivedi), Prem Vishe (with Anil Chavda) and Sahityama Dariyo (with Praful Raval and Rajendra Patel.

== Recognition ==
He received the Shayda Award (2010) and the Kalapi Award (2012) for his contribution and development of Gujarati ghazal. Gujarati Sahitya Parishad conferred on him the Dilip Mehta Award (2008-2009) for his work Maun Ni Mahefil and Uma-Snehrashmi Prize (2012-2013) for his work Jhakal Ne Tadkani Vachche. His book Javavano Riaz also earned an award in 2009, given by Ghazal Sabha, a Vadodara based institution. He is also a recipient of the Kumar Suvarna Chandrak (2015) and Dhanji Kanji Gandhi Suvarna Chandrak (2015) and Harindra Dave Smriti Paritoshik (2015), presented by Harindra Dave Memorial Trust.

In 2016, he was nominated for Urdu Sahitya Gaurav Puraskar for his book Mera Apna Aasman by Gujarat Sahitya Akademi but he refused to accept the award in protest against lack of autonomy in the Akademi. He said that it was being given by a 'non-autonomous' body.

== See also ==
- List of Gujarati-language writers
