= Sadhara Jesang No Salo =

1962 Gujarati satirical novel by Chunilal Madia

- First edition cover
- Author: Chunilal Madia
- Original title: સધરા જેસંગનો સાળો
- Cover artist: Shiv Pandya
- Language: Gujarati
- Genre: Humorous novel
- Publisher: Shri Harihar Pustakalay, Surat
- Publication date: 1962
- Publication place: India
- OCLC: 20908481
- Dewey Decimal: 891.477

Sadhara Jesang No Salo (lit. Brother-in-law of Sadhara Jesang) is a 1962 Gujarati satirical novel in two parts, written by Indian writer Chunilal Madia. The novel narrates a story of Sadharo, a vegetable vendor, who eventually becomes the prime minister of a country.

== History ==
Sadhara Jesang No Salo was serialized in Sandesh, a Gujarati language daily published from Ahmedabad, in 52 installments from January to December 1961. Madia published the novel as a book into two parts in 1962.

== Synopses ==
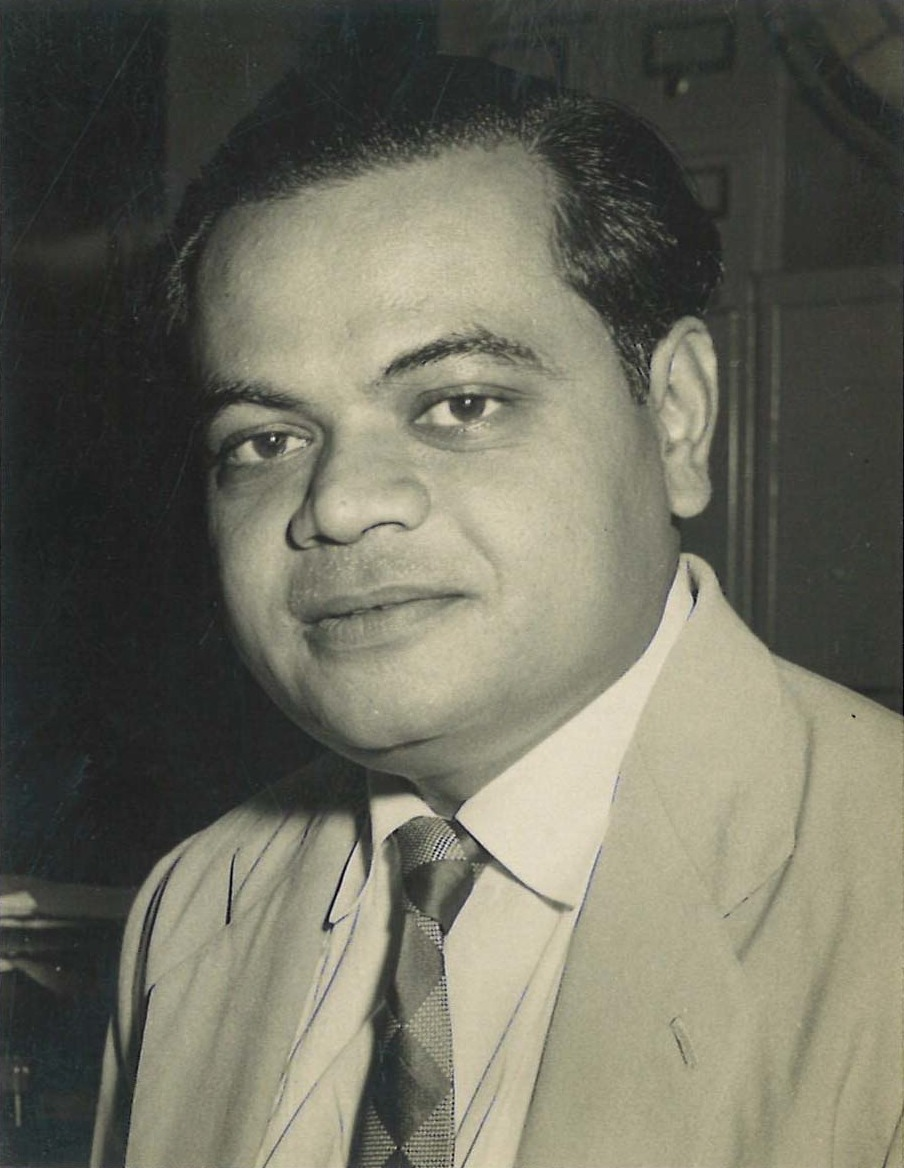
Chunilal Madia in 1958

This novel considers the high-end politics of the national leaders and the democratic working procedures of post independent India. The novel is set in a fictional land named 'Suvarnadvip'. Sadharo Jesang is the protagonist. Sadharo, a vegetable vendor, is selected by the Prajamandal Party and its party president Sevakram as their candidate for Prime Minister and Sadharo is eventually elected. Among the many other characters depicted is a European woman, Flora, who has settled in Suvarnadvip and played a major role in the politics of Suvarnadvip.

Various scams and corruptions unfold. The government puts undue influence and pressure on the judges of the Supreme Court. The government's promise to give gold to every citizen is fulfilled in a strange manner.

== Sequel ==
Madia wrote a sequel novel Sadhara Na Sala No Salo in 1967 in which the story progresses. It was serialized in the Gujarati daily newspaper Gujarat Mitra, and published as a book in 1968.

== Reception ==
Sadhara Jesang No Salo received positive reviews from critics including Digish Mehta, Madhusoodan Parekh and Balwant Jani. Madhusoodan Parekh called it a "political satirical novel". Balwant Jani, Gujarati writer and critic, acclaimed the language of the novel and considered the novel as the "milestone" of Gujarati satirical fiction.
