= Dhanji Kanji Gandhi Suvarna Chandrak =

- Civilian award for contributions to Literature
- Awarded for: Significant contribution in Gujarati literature
- Sponsored by: Gujarat Sahitya Sabha
- Location: Gujarat, India
- First award: 1983
- Final award: 2015

Highlights
- First winner: Ramesh Parekh
- Last winner: Harsh Brahmbhatt

Dhanji Kanji Gandhi Suvarna Chandrak also known as Dhanji Kanji Gandhi Gold Medal, is a literary honour in Gujarat, India given by Gujarat Sahitya Sabha. Established in 1983, the award is conferred annually on the most outstanding literate for his significant contribution in Gujarati literature. Chinu Modi rejected this medal in 1994.

== Recipients ==
The list of the recipients of Dhanji Kanji Gandhi Suvarna Chandrak is as below:

Year	Recipient
1983	Ramesh Parekh
1984	Kundanika Kapadia
1985	Pannalal Patel
1986	Rajendra Shah Chandrakant Sheth
1987	Balmukund Dave Taai Abbasali Karimbhai
1988	Madhu Rye
1989	Dhirendra Mehta
1990	Joseph Macwan
1991	Madhusudan Parekh
1992	Ramprasad Shukla
1993	Vinesh Antani
1994	Chinu Modi (not accepted)
1995	Radheshyam Sharma
1996	Chimanlal Trivedi
1997	Digish Mehta
1998	Manhar Modi
1999	Yogesh Joshi
2000	Ramesh M. Shukla
2001	Kumarpal Desai
2002	Ratilal Borisagar
2003	Manoj Khanderia
2004	Mohanlal Patel
2005	Pravin Darji
2006	Yashvant Mehta
2007	Manilal H. Patel
2008	Jayant Gadit
2009	Jyotiben Thanki
2010	Harikrishna Pathak
2011	Dhruv Bhatt
2014	Bhanuprasad Pandya
2015	Harsh Brahmbhatt
