= Liludi Dharati =

1957 Gujarati novel by Chunilal Madia

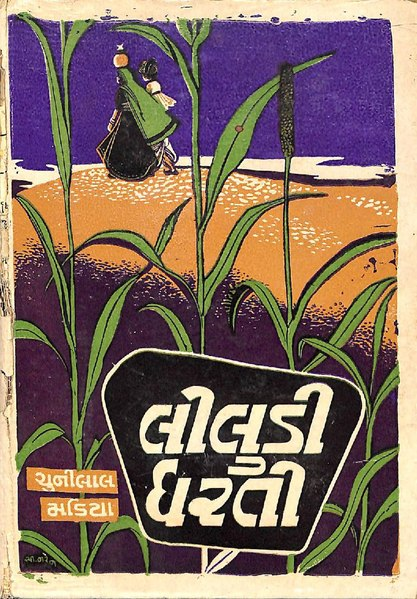
- Cover page of 1989 edition
- Author: Chunilal Madia
- Original title: લીલુડી ધરતી
- Language: Gujarati
- Genre: Novel
- Published: 1957
- Publisher: Navbharat Sahitya Mandir
- Publication place: India
- Media type: Print
- OCLC: 39130215
- Dewey Decimal: 891.473
- Followed by: Shevalna Shatdal (1960)
- Original text: લીલુડી ધરતી at Gujarati Wikisource

Liludi Dharati (Gujarati: લીલુડી ધરતી, transl. The Green Earth) is a 1957 Gujarati novel by Chunilal Madia. Though it was written is two parts, its plot is extended with inheritors in another separate novel Shevalna Shatdal (1960). The novel was made into a film by Vallabh Choksi in 1968.

== Background ==
Liludi Dharati was first serialized as a weekly installments in Janmabhumi, a Gujarati newspaper, from 15 November 1956 to 14 September 1957. It was written by Madia on insistence of Sopan, an editor of Janmabhumi. In the preface of the book, Madia mentions that he expected to complete the series in four or five months but it took longer than that.

The title is based on Santu's nature. The incarnation of a woman is like green earth which never dries.

The writer has incorporated the local dialects of Saurashtra region in the novel ingeniously as he himself belongs to the land where the novel is set. His descriptions seem indigenous and full of vitality. The novel narrates the region specific festival of Bhim Agiyaras and a sport of coconut throwing.

== Plot ==
This novel narrates the life of trapped and confused woman named Santu under strange circumstances and her miserable plight. The story is set in the remote village near the mountain Girnar namely Gundasar. Though the main story line moves around a farmer family of Hada Patel, it also includes smaller accounts of other supportive characters, giving a picture of the village life, especially elaborate negative characters and their negativity. Hada Patel has three sons. The elder one has left the village and turned a monk, the second one dies due to some disease and story commences with the last son Gobar and his fiance Santu. The story progresses depicting the struggle of pregnant Santu bearing the blame of her husband's murder.

The other major characters are Mandal (cousin of Gobar), Shadul (son of a landlord), Ragha Gor, a Brahmin hotel owner.

== Reception ==
Bhagvanbhai H. Chaudhari in his article "Chunilala Madia's Liludi Dharati: A Narrative centered on Saurastra Region" mentions that though Chunilal Madia wanted to develop the novel a chronicle, however he fails as "characters portrayed in novel Liludi Dharati does not manifest the universal life incorporating the constant changing nature" However since as society or destiny are shown as the central elements which manage the entire human life, the novel shows the vague form of plot called chronicle. Critic Nalin Raval considered it a time-dominated or period novel.

Critic Dilavarsinh Jadeja opines that "the true picture of bare reality of rural life and the emphasis towards it should be considered Madiya's specialty among Gujarati novelists".

== Adaption ==
Liludi Dharati was adapted into Gujarati film with the same name in 1968 by Vallabh Choksi. It was the first colour film of Gujarati cinema.
