= Liludi Dharati (film) =

- C.D. cover
- Directed by: Vallabh Choksi
- Written by: Chunilal Madia
- Based on: Liludi Dharati by Chunilal Madia
- Produced by: Suresh Amin
- Starring: Daisy Irani; Mahesh Desai; Kala Shah; Champshibhai Nagda; Upendra Kumar
- Music by: Purushottam Upadhyay; Gaurang Vyas
- Production company: K V Films
- Release date: 1968 (India)
- Running time: 138 minutes
- Country: India
- Language: Gujarati

Liludi Dharati (transl. The Green Earth) is a 1968 Gujarati social drama film directed by Vallabh Choksi. It stars Daizy Irani, Mahesh Desai, Kala Shah, Champshibhai Nagda, Upendra Kumar, Kishore Bhatt, Narahari Jani, Vina Prabhu, Vanalata Mehta. The film was adapted from Gujarati writer Chunilal Madia's novel of the same name. It was the first ORWO colour film of Gujarati cinema.

== Plot ==
The film follows a love story of Gobar and Santu, and is set in a rural background. It depicts the struggle of negative influence among characters and their corrupted desires. Antagonists such as Mandal and Shardul inject doubt in the lives of the couple. An unexpected twist comes in the form of the death of Gobar, which leads to Santu's loss of mental balance. After the death of Gobar, the family encounters financial stress. As a result, Santu and her sister-in-law turn to farming. Gobar's brother returns and joins the ploughing.

== Cast ==
- Daizy Irani
- Mahesh Desai, Kala Shah
- Champshibhai Nagda
- Upendra Kumar
- Kishore Bhatt
- Narahari Jani
- Vina Prabhu
- Vanalata Mehta

== Production ==
The film was adapted from Gujarati writer Chunilal Madia's novel of the same name. The screenplay was written by Manu Desai and dialogues were written by Jitubhai Mehta.

== Soundtrack ==
Liludi Dharati

Soundtrack album by Gaurang Vyas and Purushottam Upadhyay
- Released: 3 July 1968
- Genre: Feature film soundtrack
- Length: 17:39
- Language: Gujarati
- Label: Saregama

All lyrics are written by Avinash Vyas; all music is composed by Gaurang Vyas, Purushottam Upadhyay.

Track listing
No.	Title	Singer(s)	Length
1.	"Chal Mann Dur Dur Tirath Dham"	Manna Dey, Chorus	3:29
2.	"Maru Naam Padyu Chhe Santu Rangilee"	Kamal Barot	3:27
3.	"Adhvach Phatyo Dungaro"	Mohammed Rafi	3:24
4.	"Mein To Shargaryo Chachar Chowk... He Dhol Dhamakya"	Asha Bhosle, Chorus	3:14
5.	"Hari Halve Halve Hankare"	Mukesh	4:05
6.	"Adhvachche Ka Tutyo Ek Taro Re, O Udta Re Hansa?"	Rasbihari Desai, Vibha & Chorus
7.	"Liludi Dharti Sohay Re Navliya"	Rasbihari Desai, Chorus
Total length:			17:39

== Home video ==
The film was released on DVD by Moser Baer.
