= Vinesh Antani =

Gujarati writer from India

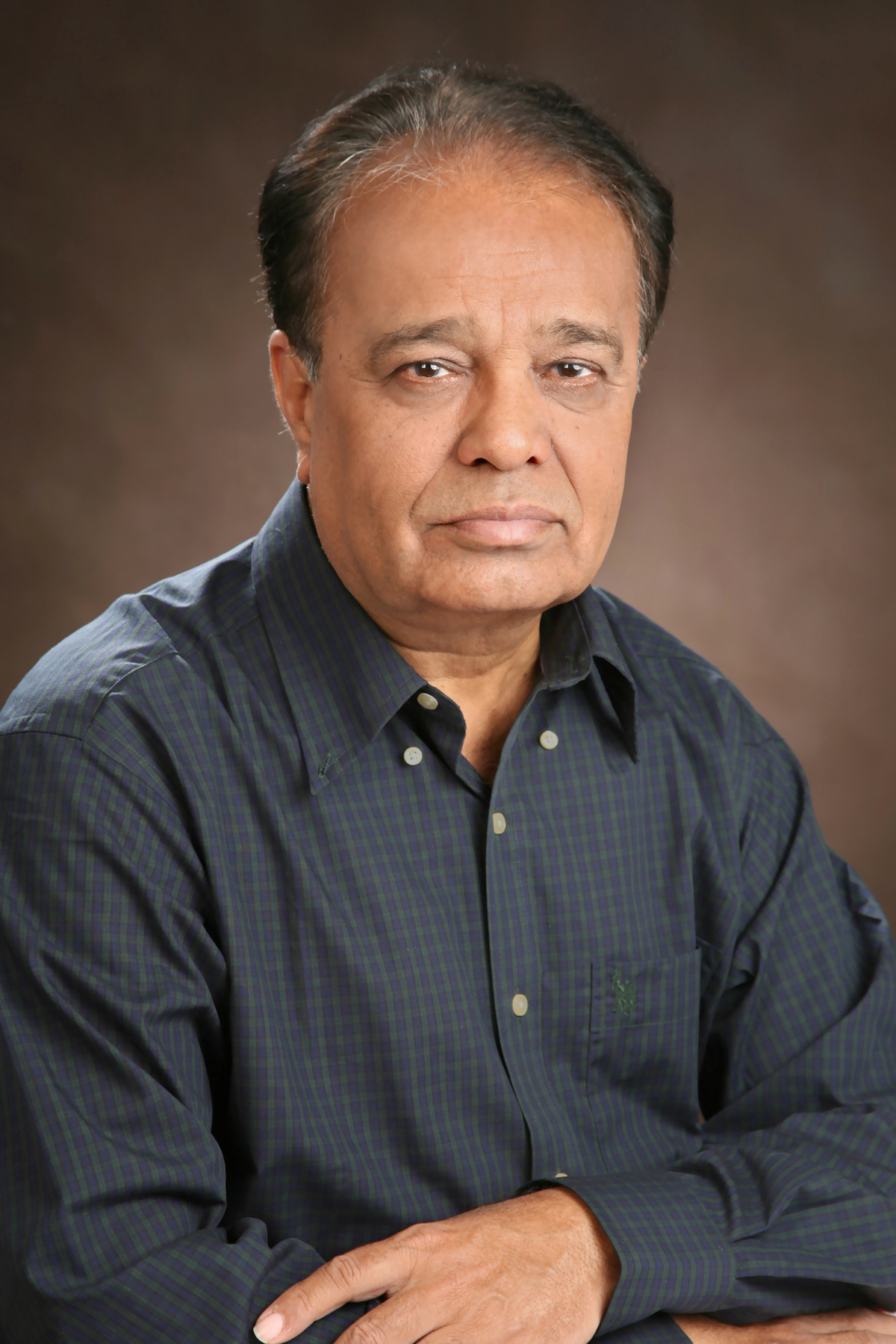
- Born: 27 June 1946 (age 80); Navavas near Mandvi, Cutch State, British India
- Education: Master of Arts
- Occupations: novelist; short story writer; translator; columnist
- Writing career
- Language: Gujarati
- Period: postmodern Gujarati literature
- Notable work: Dhundhabhari Khin (1996)
- Notable awards: Dhanji Kanji Gandhi Suvarna Chandrak (1993); Sahitya Akademi Award (2000)

Vinesh Antani is an Indian Gujarati-language novelist, short story writer, essayist and translator from Gujarat, India. He received the 2000 Sahitya Akademi Award for his novel Dhundhabhari Khin (1996).

== Life ==
Vinesh Dinkarrai Antani was born on 27 June 1946 at Navavas near Mandvi (in Kutch district, Gujarat) India. His father was primary school teacher and his mother was interested in literature. He completed his secondary school from Nakhatrana and SSC in 1962. He completed Bachelor of Arts in Gujarati-Hindi from Bhuj in 1967 and Master of Arts in Gujarati-Sanskrit in 1969. He taught Gujarati at Commerce College of Bhuj for five years. In 1975, he joined Akashvani as a Programme Director and voluntarily retired as Station Director. Later he edited Gujarati edition of India Today magazine.

== Works ==
He has written several novels including Nagarvasi (નગરવાસી, 1974), Ekantdvip (એકાંતદ્વીપ, 1975), Palashvan (પલાશવન, 1979), Priyajan (પ્રિયજન, 1980), Asopalav (Ane Chotha Male Piplo) (આસોપાલવ (અને ચોથા માળે પીપળો), 1980), Anurav (અનુરવ, 1983), Biju Koi Nathi (બીજું કોઈ નથી, 1983), Soorajni Par Dariyo (સુરજની પાર દરિયો, 1984), Jivanlal Kathamala (જીવણલાલ કથામાળા, 1986), Fans (ફાંસ, 1987), Kaflo (કાફલો, 1988), Sarpadansh (સર્પદંશ, 1989), Nirvansh (નર્વંશ, 1990), Patalgadh (પાતાળગઢ, 1992), Luptanadi (લુપ્તનદી, 1993), Anhi Sudhinu Akash (અહીં સુધીનું આકાશ), Sarovar, Dhundhabhari Khin (ધૂન્ધભરી ખીણ, 1996), Dhaad (ધાડ, 2003), Antargat (અંતર્ગત, 2002), Sarovar (ane Farm House) (સરોવર (અને ફાર્મ હાઉસ)) and Ame Ajanya (અમેં અજાણ્યાં, 2006), Bije Kyank (બીજે ક્યાંક), Jindgi Aakhi (જિંદગી આખી), Ketan Ane Sulabhani Premkatha (કેતન અને સુલભાની પ્રેમકથા). His Dhundhabhari Khin described people living amid political disturbances in Punjab. His novels are translated in Hindi as Nagarvasi, Kafila and Dhundhbhari Vadi and in Odia as Dhumrabha Upatyaka.

Antani has started his career with short stories. Holarav (1983), Ranzanavu (1989), Ahin Koi Rahetun Nathi, Pachha Valvu and Tane Khabar Nathi, Niru (2008) are his collections of short stories. Potpotano Varsad (1992), Tya Maru Ghar Hatu (2004), Atmani Nadina Kanthe and Dhumadani Jem are his collections of essays. His essays under Doobaki series include Doobki, Marjeeva, Koik Smit, Sugandh ane Smriti, Saat Secondnu Ajavalu, Soneri Bund. He edited Gujarati Navalikachayan: 1994-95 (on short stories), 2005 ni Shreshth Vaartao (Best Stories of 2005) and Gamvato (Essays of Manilal H. Patel).

He translated Hindi author Nirmal Verma's works as Ek Chinthru Sukh (1997) and Kagado ane Chhutkaro. He also translated Erich Segal's Love Story in Gujarati.

He has written radio plays, Leela Vansno Tahuko and Malipa. He translated Hindi playwright Mani Madhukar's play as Andhrei Nagari in Gujarati. His absurd play Himmatlal Himmatlal is also performed for audience.

== Awards ==
He was awarded Dhanji Kanji Gandhi Suvarna Chandrak (1993) and K. M. Munshi Suvarna Chandrak. His works have received prizes of Gujarati Sahitya Parishad and Gujarat Sahitya Akademi. He received Sahitya Akademi Award for Gujarati writers in 2000 for his work Dhundhabhari Khin.

Awards
Preceded by Niranjan Bhagat	Recipient of the Sahitya Akademi Award winners for Gujarati; 2000	Succeeded by Dhiruben Patel
