= Joseph Macwan =

- Born: Joseph Ignas Macwan; 9 October 1936; Tranol, Anand, Gujarat
- Died: March 28, 2010 (aged 73); Nadiad, Gujarat
- Education: Master of Arts
- Occupations: Novelist, biographer
- Spouse: Reginaben (m. 1955)
- Writing career
- Language: Gujarati
- Years active: 1956–2010
- Genres: Novel, biography
- Subjects: realism
- Notable works: Vyathana Vitak (Agony of Suffering; 1985); Angaliyat (The Step Child; 1986)
- Notable awards: Sahitya Akademi Award (1989); Dhanji Kanji Gandhi Suvarna Chandrak (1990)
- Literary movement: Dalit literature in India

Joseph Ignas Macwan (9 October 1936 – 28 March 2010) was an Indian Gujarati-language novelist, short story writer and essayist from Gujarat, India. He received the Sahitya Akademi Award in 1989 for his novel Angaliyat (1986). He was also a recipient of the Dhanji Kanji Gandhi Suvarna Chandrak (1990). His significant works include: Vyathana Vitak (Agony of Suffering; 1985), Angaliyat (The Step Child; 1986) and Mari Paranetar (1988). He died on 28 March 2010, in Nadiad following kidney failure.

== Biography ==
Macwan's grandfather was a Hindu, but he adopted Christianity in 1892. Macwan was born on 9 October 1936 in Tranol, a small village of Kheda taluka, Anand district, Gujarat. His family were natives of Oad, a small village nearby. He was born in the village of Tranol. He was born there because his father Ignas, or Dahyalal was working with a Christian mission there. His father was also known as a master in his village. His childhood passed in poverty and lack of maternal care. His mother Hiriben (Hira) died when he was young. His father soon married another woman who was cruel to him.

Macwan was a prodigy. He was admitted to school when he was five years old because of his reading and writing skills. Which were more advanced than those of most students of the usual admitting age of seven years. At that time it was unusual to study in school in his community. He had good memory skills and he could remember poems by listening to his brother who used to recite poems to his ill mother. He studied in the Missionary School of Oad village until fourth grade, then he did two grades at a local board school. He passed the vernacular final exam at the I P Mission School of Nadiad in 1950.

Due to poverty, he joined the Christian Missionary School at Khamloj as a teacher when he was fourteen. Later he was transferred to Missionary School, Nadiad as a Deputy PTC (Primary Teacher's Collage) in 1955. In the same year, he passed matriculation with 72%. He also completed Vinit Visharad and Rashtrabhasha Ratna during the same period. In 1957, he joined St. Xavier's School in Anand as a teacher of Hindi language. He passed a Master of Arts in Hindi by studying in weekend classes while working as a teacher. He served as a visiting lecturer of Hindi at the College of Dakor from 1971 to 1972 and at M B College, Vidyanagar from 1972 to 1977. Later, he resigned from his visiting lecturer posts and continued to teach at the St. Xavier's School until his retirement in 1994.

He married Reginaben in November 1955, and they had four daughters and four sons.

He died on 28 March 2010, in Nadiad following kidney failure.

== Literary career ==
Macwan's writing is inspired by his real life experiences.

His first novel Angaliyat (The Stepchild) was published in 1986, followed by Lakshman Ni Agni Pariksha (1986), Mari Parnetar (1988), Manakhani Mirat (1992), Bij-Trij Na Tej (1995), Ajanma Aparadhi (1995), Dada Na Deshma (1996), Mavatar (1996), Amar Chandalo (2002), Dariya (2006), Sangavato, Bhini Mati Kora Man (2004), Apano Paras Aap (2005) and Charushila (2011). Macwan depicted the life of the Charotar region in his novels. Vyathana Vitak, is a biographical work published in 1985, followed by Vahalna Valkha (1987), Prit Pramani Pagle Pagle (1987) and Mari Bhillu (1989). Sadhna Ni Aaradhna (1989) is a short story collection.

== Translations and adaptations ==
His novel Angaliyat has been translated into English by Rita Kothari as The Stepchild in 2004. His Lohino Sambandh has been adapted as the film Bas Yari Rakho (English title: My Little Devil) and Baheru Aayakhu Mungi Vyatha has been adapted as a tele-film.

== Recognition ==
He won Sahitya Akademi Award for Gujarati language in 1989 for his novel Angaliyat. He won Dhanji Kanji Gandhi Suvarna Chandrak in 1990.

== See also ==
- List of Gujarati-language writers
