= Dhirendra Mehta =

Indian novelist, poet, critic and editor (Born: 1944)

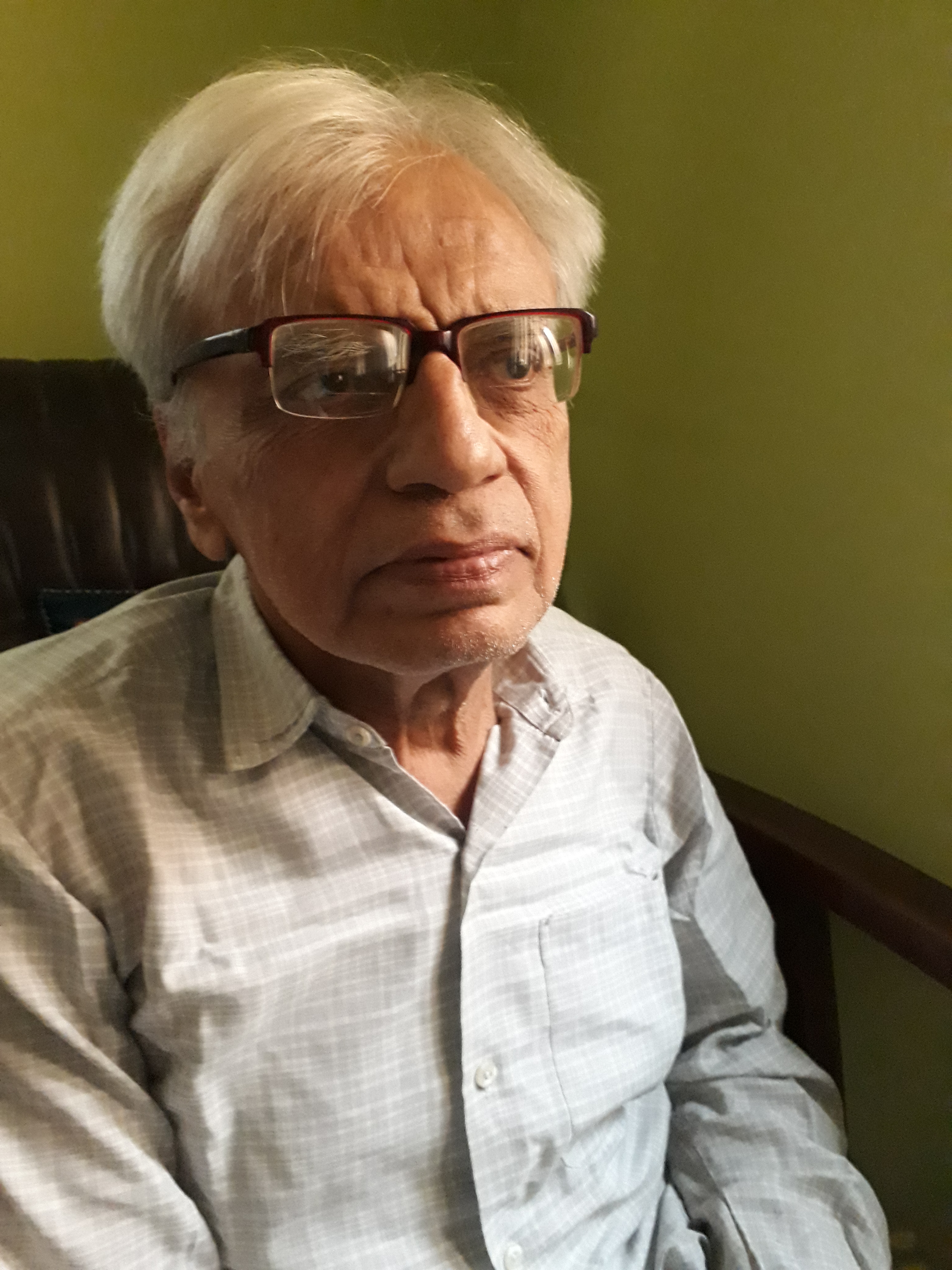
- At his home in Bhuj, November 2017
- Born: 29 August 1944 (age 82); Ahmedabad, Gujarat, India
- Citizenship: Indian
- Education: B.A., Ph.D.
- Alma mater: Gujarat University
- Occupations: Novelist; Poet; Critic; Editor
- Writing career
- Language: Gujarati
- Notable work: Chhavni
- Notable awards: Sahitya Academy Award (2010); Ranjitram Suvarna Chandrak (2011)

Dhirendra Pritamlal Mehta is a Gujarati novelist, poet, critic and editor who received the 2010 Sahitya Akademi Award for Gujarati language for his novel Chhavni.

== Life ==
Dhirendra Mehta was born in Ahmedabad on 29 August 1944. His family belonged to Bhuj. At the age of four, he suffered from poliomyelitis in both his legs. He matriculated from Alfred High School, Bhuj in 1961. He completed B.A. in Gujarati with first class in 1966. In 1968, he completed M.A. in Gujarati and Hindi from School of Languages, Gujarat University. In 1976, he received Ph.D. for his dissertation, Gujarātī Navalakathānō Upēyalakṣī Abhyāsa. He briefly worked at Akashvani, Bhuj and later joined H. K. Arts College as Research Fellow. He taught Gujarati literature as a Head of the Department in Gujarat College, Ahmedabad from 1970 to 1976. Then he moved to Bhuj and taught Gujarati literature as the Head of the Department of Gujarati and Undergraduate Centre in R. R. Lalan College until his retirement in November 2006. He served as a visiting professor for two years at KSKV Kutch University.

== Works ==
Valay (1971) was his first novel dealing with subjects of love, relationships and their impacts resulting in depression, unhappiness and loneliness. His next two novels, Chihna (1978) and Adrashya (1980), also expand on the similar subjects. Kaveri Ane Darpanlok (1988) has two novellas adapted from radio plays, both having two female protagonists. Ghar (1995) has four stories dealing with subjects of home and death, pointing to the nature of change. His other novels include Dishantar, Apane Loko, Dharna (1990), Khovai Gayeli Vastu (2001), Bhandari Bhavan (2002) and Chhavni (2006). Loneliness and depression have been continued subjects of exploration.

Sanmukh (1985) is collection of 26 stories. Atlu Badhu Sukh and Hu Ene Jou E Pahela are his other story collections. Pavanna Veshma (1955) collects his 119 poems written between 1963 and 1993. Pratyanchano Kamp is his other poetry collection.

His dissertation is published as Nandshankarthi Umashankar (1984). He wrote short biography Dr. Jayant Khatri (1977) under Gujarat Granthkar series. Nisbat (1990), Ghardo Minj To Gare (1993), Morchangna Soor (1995) are works of criticism. He edited Ranni Ankhma Dariyo (1986, collection of stories from Kutch), Jayant Khatrini Vartao (2004, Stories of Jayant Khantri), Gujarati Kavita Chayan (2003). Bhuskani Ujani (1986) is collection of children's poetry. Mehtaji, Tame Eva Shu? is his memoir.

== Recognition ==
He has been awarded R. V. Desai Award (1994), Critics Award (1985), Jayant Khatri - Bakulesh Award (2000), Dhanji Kanji Gandhi Suvarna Chandrak, K. M. Munshi Chandrak, Darshak Award (2003) and 12th Dumketu Navalika Puraskar. He is also awarded by Gujarati Sahitya Parishad and Gujarat Sahitya Akademi. In 2010, he received Sahitya Akademi Award for Gujarati language for his novel Chhavni. In 2011, he was awarded Ranjitram Suvarna Chandrak.

== Personal life ==
He married Nutanben in 1977 and has two daughters, Venu and Shalmali.

== See also ==
- List of Gujarati-language writers

Awards
Preceded by Shirish Panchal	Recipient of the Sahitya Akademi Award winners for Gujarati; 2010	Succeeded by Mohan Parmar
