= Fero (novel) =

1968 Gujarati novel by Radheshyam Sharma

- book cover, 2007 ed.
- Author: Radheshyam Sharma
- Original title: ફેરો
- Language: Gujarati
- Genre: novel
- Set in: Ahmedabad
- Published: 1968
- Publisher: Rekha Prakashan, Ahmedabad
- Publication place: India
- Media type: Print
- Pages: 94
- Dewey Decimal: 891.473
- Followed by: Swapnatirtha (1979)
- Text: Fero online

Fero (Gujarati: ફેરો) (English: The Trip) is a Gujarati novel written by Radheshyam Sharma. It was published in 1968 by Rekha Prakashan in Ahmedabad. It is acclaimed in Gujarati literature for its experimental nature and is considered a literary milestone among modern Gujarati authors. It was followed by Sharma's similarly exploratory novel, Swapnatirtha.

== Plot ==
A couple, who have a mute, only-child, take a long journey to the Sun temple with the hope that the gift of speech is granted to their child. The trip is an attempt to appease their God. The mother is hopeful at the start of the journey, but the child is lost as the train pulls out of the final station before the destination. In an attempt to stop the train, the father raises his hand to pull the chain but hesitates before doing so. The story is written from the father's perspective, and the reader is only privy to his observations and reactions.

The novel is narrated in the first person, beginning with the family's departure and ending before the journey's completion.

== Theme ==
The story reflects the predicament of a man of modern times. The novel is centred on the theme of human consciousness. It delves into the complexity of thought and awareness as the family struggles to complete their journey. There is repeated mention of ennui and boredom in the novel.

== Reception ==
Chandrakant Sheth, a Gujarati critic, considers the prose of the novel too aristocratic in nature.

The name of this novel is referenced in the title of Suman Shah's critical work Chandrakant Bakshi Thi Fero (1973).
