= Pravaldvip =

16 poems written by Niranjan Bhagat

Pravaldvip, also spelled Pravaldweep (transl. Coral Island), is a series of 16 poems in Gujarati language written by Indian writer Niranjan Bhagat, between 1946 and 1956. The collection includes four sonnets, five long poems, and seven short poems composed in various poetic metres. The poems are considered notable for introducing a metropolitan consciousness and modern sensibility to Gujarati poetry for the first time, with Bhagat establishing himself as a prominent poet in Gujarati literature. The poems of Pravaldvip were translated by Rita Kothari and Suguna Ramanathan under the title Coral Island (2002).

== Background ==
The poems of Pravaldvip were written over a decades, from 1946 and 1956. Bhagat moved to Mumbai in 1946 and joined the Elphinstone College to complete his Bachelor of Arts degree.

He wrote:

'I wandered through the streets of Mumbai at different hours of morning, noon, evening [,] and midnight. During this flânerie, solitary on amidst crowds, I stumbled against phrases, lines, images [,] and rhythms of my poems,. representing sights, sounds, and smells of the streels, reflecting time and place, recreating the mood and the mind of the people, and revealing the mysteries of a massive metropolis and its myriad multitudes, which came to me suddenly and surprisingly. I wrote 16 poems between 1946 and 1956 and published them serially in literary periodicals. Finally, I collected them under the title 'Pravaldvip' and published them in 1956. It is poetry of cityscape, of urban experience in an unreal city. It is social and cerebral, cryptic [,] and colloquial. Critics think that 'Pravaldvip' has inaugurated the age of modernism in Gujarati poetry. In these poems I placed my feeling of loneliness in a larger context and projected my sense of solitude onto a wider perspective and hoped to overcome and outgrow them.'

— Niranjan Bhagat

Bhagat acknowledged inspiration from Gujarati poems including Narmad's "Narmtekri", Umashankar Joshi's "Atma na Khander" (Ruins of Soul) and Balwantray Thakore's "Bhankar", apart from his personal experiences. He also quoted modernist poets like T. S. Eliot, Charles Baudelaire and Rainer Maria Rilke.

== The Poems ==
Pravaldvip consist of 16 poems among which there are four sonnet, five long poems and seven short poems, composed in various meters including Gulbanki, Harigit, Anushtup, Pruthvi, Shardulvikridit. The poems in the collection are:

1. "Mumbainagri" (Bombay City)
2. "Adhunik Aranya" (A Modern Forest)
3. "Kolaba par Suryast" (Sunset on Colaba)
4. "Epolo par Chandroday" (Moonrise on Apollo)
5. "Fauntanna Busstop par" (At the Fountain Bus Stop)
6. "Charchgetthi Lokalma" (In a Local Train from Churchgate)
7. "Hornbi Rod" (Hornby Road)
8. "Patro" (Characters)
9. "Gayatri" (Gayatri)
10. "Myuziyamma" (At the Museum)
11. "Zuma" (At the Zoo)
12. "Ekveriyamma' (In the Aquarium)
13. "Eodrom Par" (At the Aerodrome)
14. "Kafema" (In the Café)
15. "Foklend Road" (Falkland Road)
16. "Flora Fauntan" (Flora Fountain)

== Reception ==
The poems of Pravaldvip have been considered groundbreaking for its style of expression. The poems introduced a metropolitan consciousness and modernist influences to Gujarati poetry for the first time, with Bhagat establishing himself as a prominent poet in Gujarati literature. The poem "Gayatri" is considered the peak of both Pravaldvip and Niranjan Bhagat's entire literary work. Critic Bholabhai Patel commented that "His use of the 'Anushtup meter' in this poem ranks him along with two other great predecessors, Kavi Nhanalal and Sundaram," whose works, "Pitrutarpan" and "13:07 ni Local", written in the same meter, were also highly praised. He further remarks: "In Pravaldveeep, Niranjan Bhagat has not only modernised Gujarati poetry, but also has urbanised it".

Chandrakant Topiwala wrote: "The group of ‘Pravaldwip’ poems is an explosion of images depicting the powerful effects the poet experienced during his stay in Mumbai. These modern themes, organized in classical lines, are full of sensibility. This represents a new form of urban poetry in the Gujarati language".

Shailesh Parekh, biographer of Bhagat, remarks: "...these poems, blending East with the West, tradition with the modernity and revealing a voice that is distinctive and inimitable, are a distinct landmark and a pathbreaking beacon in the realm of Gujarati literature".

The poems of Pravaldvip were translated by Rita Kothari and Suguna Ramanathan under the title Coral Island, published by the Gujarat Sahitya Akademi in 2002.
