= Rita Kothari =

Indian author and translator

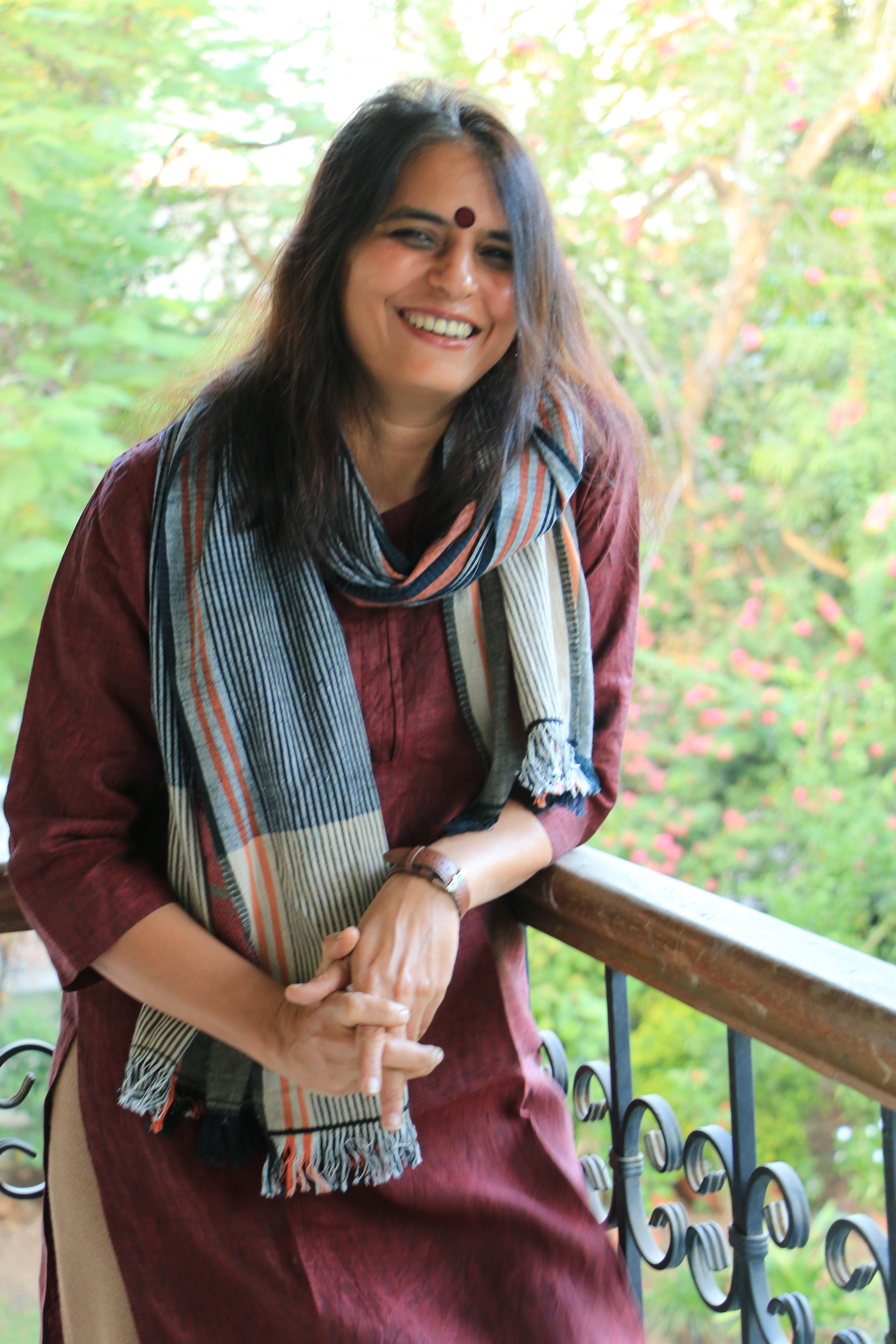
- Rita Kothari, December 2017
- Born: 30 July 1969 (age 57); Gujarat
- Education: Gujarat University; University of Pune
- Occupations: Scholar, translator, translation theorist, professor
- Writing career
- Language: Gujarati, English, Sindhi
- Notable works: Translating India (2003); The Burden of Refuge: The Sindhi Hindus of Gujarat (2007); Unbordered Memories (2009); Uneasy Translations (2022)

Academic background
- Thesis: Indian Literature in English Translation: The Social Context (1999)
- Doctoral advisor: Suguna Ramanathan
- Website: ittgn.academia.edu/RitaKothari

Rita Kothari (born 30 July 1969) is an Indian scholar, translator and translation theorist from Gujarat, India. In an attempt to preserve her memories and her identity as a member of the Sindhi people, Kothari wrote several books on the partition of India and its effects on people. She has translated several Gujarati works into English.

== Life ==
Kothari completed a Bachelor of Arts degree in 1989 at St. Xavier's College, Ahmedabad, followed two years later by a Master of Arts degree in English literature at the University of Pune. She was awarded a Master of Philosophy degree in 1995 and a Doctor of Philosophy degree in 2000 from Gujarat University for her research work in The Experience of Translating Hindi Prose and Translating India : The Cultural Politics of English, respectively.

Kothari teaches in the English department at Ashoka University, Sonipat. She worked from 2007 to 2017 with the Humanities and Social Sciences Department at the Indian Institute of Technology, Gandhinagar. She taught Indian literature in English and translation at St. Xavier's College, Ahmedabad from 1992 to 2007. Following that she joined MICA (Institute of Strategic Marketing and Communication) as a professor in culture and communication.

Kothari's teaching interests include literature, cinema, ethnography, and cultural history. Movement across languages, contexts, and cultures form the fulcrum of her interests, making translation the prism through which she sees the Indian context.

She lives in Ahmedabad.

== Works ==
In an attempt to preserve memories and her identity as Sindhi, Kothari wrote Translating India: The Cultural Politics of English (2003), The Burden of Refuge: The Sindhi Hindus of Gujarat (2007), Unbordered Memories : Partition Stories from Sindh (2009), and Memories and Movements (2016).

Kothari co-translated Modern Gujarati Poetry and Coral Island: The Poetry of Niranjan Bhagat. She translated Joseph Macwan's Gujarati novel Angaliayat as The Stepchild and Ila Mehta's Vaad as Fence (2015) into English. She co-edited Decentring Translation Studies : India and Beyond (2009) with Judy Wakabayashi and Chutnefying English : The Phenomenon of Hinglish (2011) with Rupert Snell. She is the editor and translator of Speech and Silence : Literary Journeys by Gujarati Women. She co-translated with her husband, Abhijit Kothari, K. M. Munshi's Patan trilogy: Patan Ni Prabhuta as The Glory of Patan (2017), Gujarat No Nath as The Lord and Master of Gujarat (2018) and Rajadhiraj as King of Kings (2019).

== Selected publications ==
- Rita Kothari (8 April 2014). Translating India. Routledge. ISBN 978-1-317-64216-9.
- Rita Kothari; Rupert Snell (2011). Chutnefying English: The Phenomenon of Hinglish. Penguin Books India. ISBN 978-0-14-341639-5.
- Rita Kothari (1 February 2007). The Burden of Refuge: the Sindhi Hindus of Gujarat. Orient Longman. ISBN 978-81-250-3157-4.
- Rita Kothari (30 September 1999). Indian literature in english translation the social context. Gujarat University. hdl:10603/46404.
- Kothari, Rita, ed. (2022). The Greatest Gujarati Stories Ever Told. New Delhi: Aleph Book Company. ISBN 978-93-91047-48-1.
