= Digish Mehta =

- Born: Digish Nanubhai Mehta; 12 July 1934; Patan, Gujarat, India
- Died: 13 June 2001 (aged 66); Ahmedabad, Gujarat
- Education: MA, PhD
- Alma mater: Gujarat College; University of Leeds
- Occupations: Essayist, novelist, critic and translator
- Spouse: Smita (m. 1963)
- Children: 2 daughter
- Writing career
- Language: Gujarati
- Notable work: Apno Ghadik Sang (1962)

Academic background
- Thesis: The Experience of Religious Conversion and Its Impact on The Creation of the Major Personae in The Poetry of T. S. Eliot from Prufrock to Ash Wednesday (1981)
- Doctoral advisor: R. A. Malagi

Digish Nanubhai Mehta (12 July 1934 ― 13 June 2001) was a Gujarati language essayist, novelist and critic from Gujarat, India.

== Biography ==
He was born on 12 July 1934 at Patan (now in Gujarat, India). He completed his primary and secondary education from Sidhpur. He matriculated in 1949. He completed BA in English and Psychology from Dharmendrasinhji College, Rajkot in 1953. He completed MA from Gujarat College and joined Ramanand Mahavidyalaya (now H. K. Arts College) in June 1955 as a professor of English. He went to University of Leeds, England in 1967 and completed MA in 1968. In 1970, he joined School of Languages, Gujarat University as the Reader in English. In 1982, he completed PhD on T. S. Eliot. He retired on 31 October 1994. He died on 13 June 2001 at Ahmedabad.

He married Smita in 1963, and he had two daughters.

== Works ==
Mehta's essays first appeared in Sanskriti in 1960–62. In 1970, his first collection of fourteen essays Doorna E Soor was published. Two more essays were added in its second edition. His second essay collection Sheri (1995) includes 53 essays. Apno Ghadik Sang (1962) is his experimental novella with light humour. Shatrudhnani Paheli Safar (1999) is his experimental novel. His studies in Gujarati and English literature appear in his works of criticism like Pashchatya Navalkatha (Western Novels, 1975, with Harshad Desai), Paridhi (1976) and Ketlik Sahityik Sangnyao (2006). Shrimad Rajchandra (1980) is a short biography of Shrimad Rajchandra. English! English! (1999) is his educational book on English language for Gujarati readers. He translated The Chairs by Eugène Ionesco in Gujarati as Khurshio (2000) and A Defence of Poetry by Percy Bysshe Shelley as Kavitanu Bachavnamu (2000). His one-act plays are Jay Dhoranlalki! and Dado. He co-edited Jayanti Dalalni Pratinidhi Vartao (Selected Stories of Jayanti Dalal, 1991) with Radheshyam Sharma and Aniruddh Brahmabhatt.
