= Chunilal Madia =

Indian author (1922–1968)

- ચુનીલાલ કાળિદાસ મડિયા
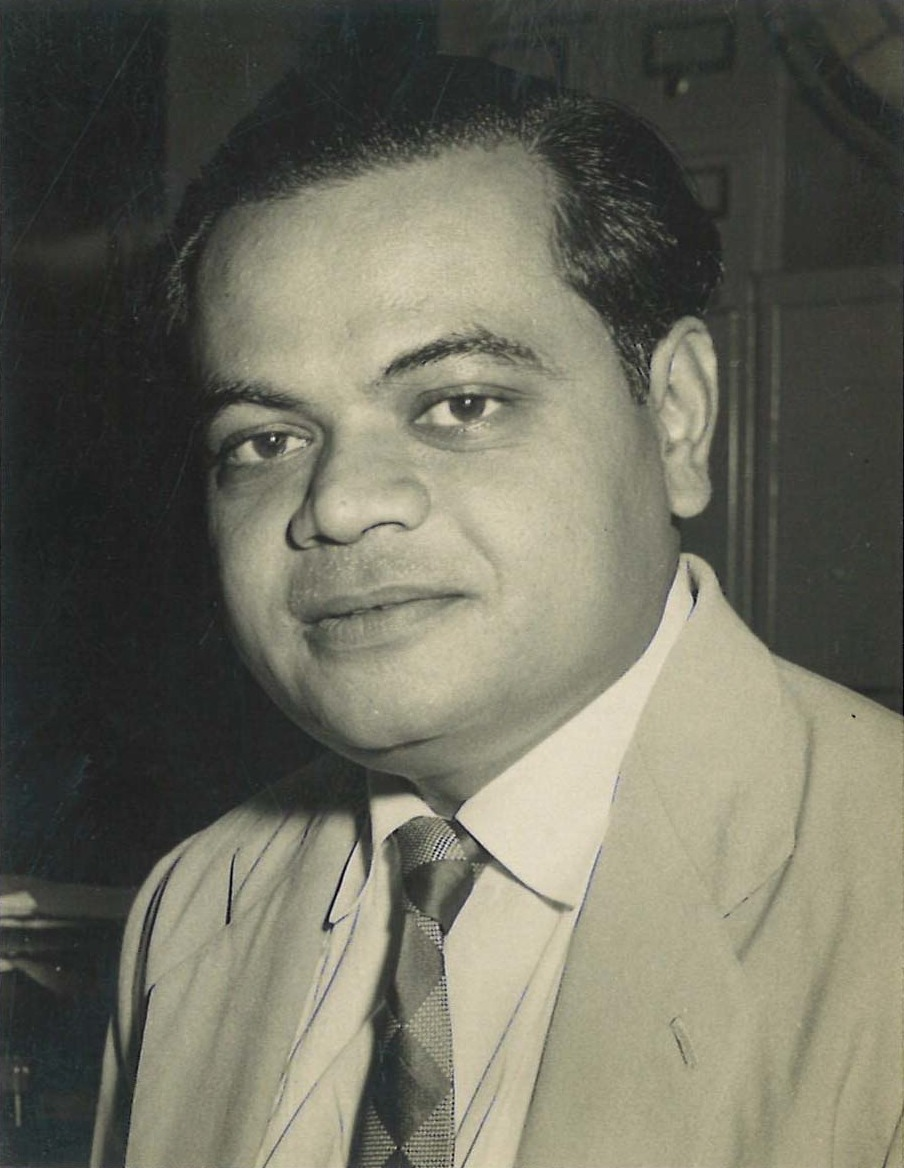
- Madia at Mumbai, 1958
- Born: Chunilal Kalidas Madia; 12 August 1922; Dhoraji, Gujarat
- Died: 29 December 1968 (aged 46); Ahmedabad, Gujarat
- Education: B. Com.
- Alma mater: H. L. College of Commerce, Ahmedabad; Sidenham College, Mumbai
- Occupations: Novelist, short story writer, poet, essayist, critic
- Spouse: Daksha (m. 1956)
- Children: Apurva, Amitabh (son); Purvi (daughter)
- Writing career
- Language: Gujarati
- Years active: 1945–1968
- Genres: Novel, short story, Essay, sonnet
- Notable works: Vyajno Varas (1946); Liludi Dharti (1957); Sadhara Jesang No Salo (1962)
- Notable awards: Narmad Suvarna Chandrak (1951); Ranjitram Suvarna Chandrak (1957)

Chunilal Madia (12 August 1922 – 29 December 1968) was a Gujarati author from Gujarat, India, primarily known for his novels and short stories set in rural Saurashtra. Recipients of several awards, he is considered one of the leading writers of Gujarati literature.

== Biography ==
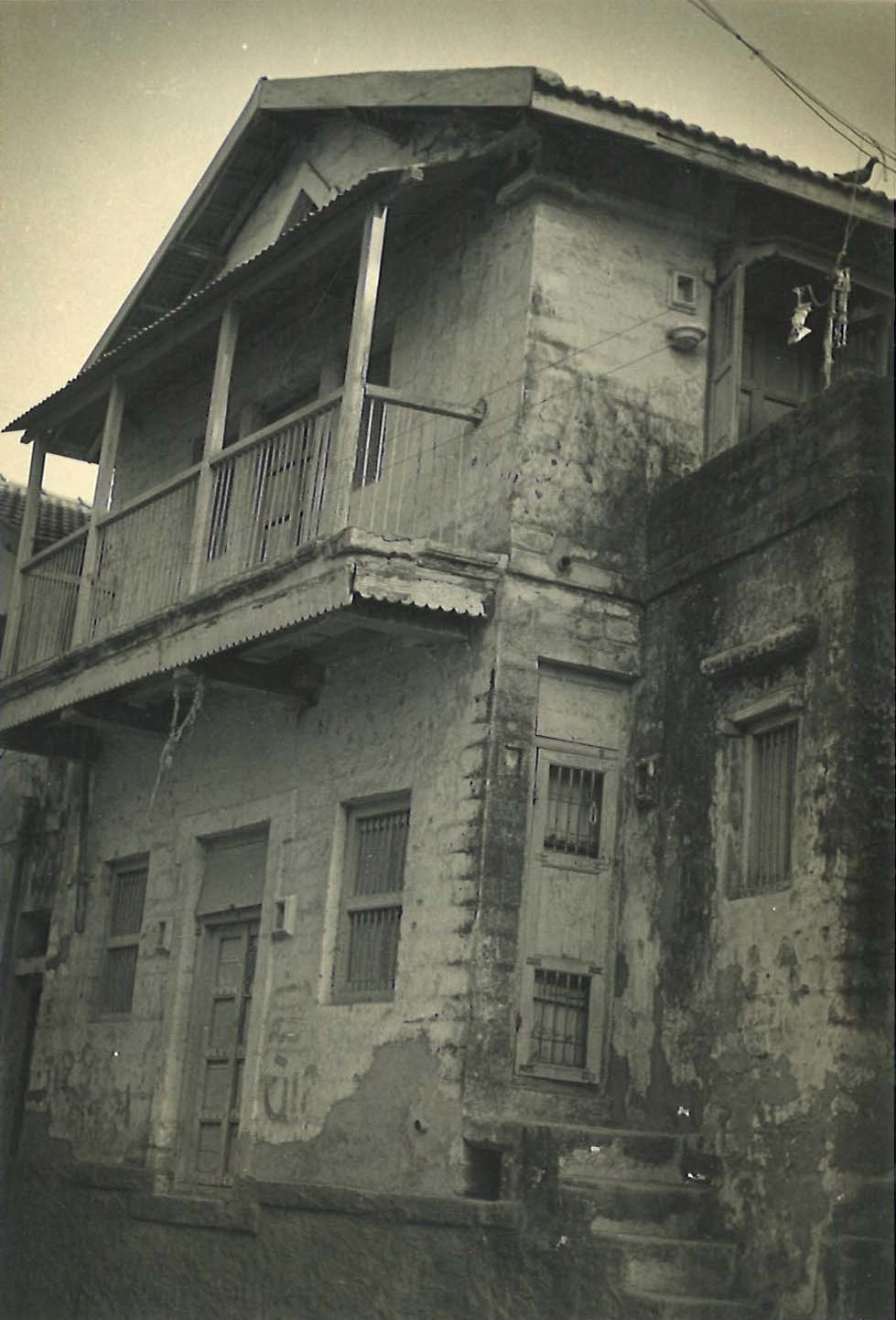
Birthplace of Madia in Dhoraji

Chunilal Madia's ancestors had immigrated to Dhoraji (now in Rajkot district, Gujarat) from Nikava village in Halar region. He was born in middle class Jain Baniya family on 12 August 1922 in Dhoraji to a grocery shop owner Kalidas Jadavji and his wife Prankunwar a.k.a. Kasumbabahen. Chunilal was youngest among ten siblings, of whom only five survived till adulthood.

After completing matriculation at Dhoraji, Madia at the age of 19 years shifted to Ahmedabad for higher studies in Commerce faculty. He enrolled as a student at the H. L. College of Commerce. While pursuing his college studies at Ahmedabad, Chunilal Madia joined a daily Prabhat as a journalist and sub-editor. Here his mentor was the veteran journalist Kakalbhai Kothari. He worked in the editing department of Janmabhumi, a Gujarati daily, and Gujarati department of the United States Information Service (USIS) from 1950 to 1962.

He died on 29 December 1968 in Ahmedabad following heart attack.

== Works ==
Madia is considered one of the leading writers in Gujarati literature. Although he primarily contributed fiction, his plays both one-act and full-length are a landmark in Gujarati theatre. They have a high literary quality and stage ability. He portrayed rural life and urban life (of Mumbai) with rustic wisdom and piercing satire. He was founder-editor of Ruchi, a literary monthly.

Novels

Pawak Jwala (1945), Vyajno Varas (1946), Eendhan Ochhan Padyan (1951), Vela Velani Chhanyadi (1956), Liludi Dharti (1957), Sheval na Shatdal (1960), Sadhara Jesang No Salo (1962), Grahashtak Vatta Ek (1965), Sadharana Salano Salo (1968) and Ala Dhadhalnun Jhinjhavadar (1968) are his novels set in rural setting. His novel Kumkum Ane Ashka (1962) depicts Mahmud Ghazni's invasion on Somnath temple. Preetvachhoyan (1960) and Indradhanuno Athmo Rang (1967) are his novels which depict the theme of psychological conflicts of city life.

Short Stories

He invented realistic approach in his short stories, depicting the rural life of Saurashtra region. His short stories are characterized by an attractive language of the rural people, insight into the inner world of characters and a dramatic turn of events. His short stories are published in several volumes: Ghooghavatan Poor (1945), Gamdun Bole Chhe (1945), Padmaja (1947), Champo Ane Kel (1950), Tej ane Timir (1952), Roop-Aroop (1953), Sharnai na Soor (1954) Antahsrota (1956), Madiani Shreshthha Vartao (1958), Jacob Circle Sat Rasta (1959), Kshanardh (1962), Kshat-Vikshat (1968) and Khaknun Poyanun (1985) (posthumous). Some of his short stories compiled in vulems: Madiani Pratinidhi Vartao (1999; Compiled by Balvant Jani), Chunilal Madiani Chunteli Vartao (2001; Compiled by Amitabh Madia), Goraj, Madiani Gramkathao, Madiani Hasyakathao and Madiani Samagra Navalikao (The Collected Short Stories of Madia) part- 1,2,3 and 4.

Compilation of Poems

- Sonnet (1959)

Long Plays

- Hun Ne Mari Vahu (1949)
- Shoonyashesh (1957)
- Ramlo Robinhood (1962)

Compilation of One Act Plays

- Rangada (1951)
- Vishvimochan (1955)
- Raktatilak (1956)
- Madiana Pratinidhi Nibandh (1999) (Compiled by Balvant Jani)

Compilation of Essays

- Chopatine Bankadethi (1959)

Travelogue

- Jay Girnar (1948)

Biographical writings

- Gandhijina Guruo (1956)
- Vidyapremi Forbes (1966)

Compilations of Essays in Criticism

- Vartavimarsh (1961)
- Granthgarima (1961)
- Gujarati Sahityaman Dokiyun (1963)
- Shahmrug-Suvarnamrug (1966)
- Kathalok (1968)
- Madiana Pratinidhi Nibandh (1999) (Compiled by Balvant Jani)
- Chhindun Kholtan (2001) (Compiled by Amitabh Madia)
- Chand Alfaz (2001) (Compiled by Amitabh Madia)
- Press Cottings (2003) (Compiled by Amitabh Madia)
- Madiana Mulakman (2004) (Compiled by Amitabh Madia)
- Madiana Ruchilokmam (2006) (Compiled by Amitabh Madia)
- Madiana Shabdalokmam (2007) (Compiled by Amitabh Madia)

Miscellaneous

Chunilal Madia Vishesh: Liludi Dharatithi (2000) (Compiled by Amitabh Madia) Amitabh Madia has written a book "Chunilal Madia: Ek Abhyas" (2010). It contains a short biography and documentary fact about Madia's work.

Adaptations

Feature films based on Chunilal Madia's novels and short stories:

- Samay Bada Balvan (1958): A Hindi Bollywood film directed by Sohrab Mody based on Madia's Gujarati Novel "Vela Vela Ni Chhhanyadi"
- Liludi Dharati (The Green Earth; 1968): A Gujarati film directed by Vallabh Choksi is based on Madia's Novel by the same name.
- Mari Hel Utaro Raj (1977): a Gujarati film directed by Manhar Raskapoor, based on Madia's short story "Antahasrota"
- Mirch Masala (1985): A Hindi film directed by Ketan Mehta, based on Madia's short story "Abhu Makarani". The cast includes Smita Patil, Deepti Naval, Suresh Obeoi, Om Puri, Deena Pathak, Paresh Raval and Naseeruddin Shah. Produced by The National Film Development Corporation of India.
- Pawak Jwala (1998): A Gujarati tele-film in two episodes directed by Shailesh Prajapati.

== Awards ==
He was awarded Narmad Suvarna Chandrak for his play Rangada in 1947 and Ranjitram Suvarna Chandrak in 1957.
