= Visnagar =

Visnagar Copper city
- Town
- Location in Gujarat, India
- Coordinates: 23.7°N 72.55°E
- Country: India
- State: Gujarat
- District: Mehsana
- Region: North Gujarat
- Founded: 953
- Founder: King Vishaldev

Government
  - Type: Municipality
  - Body: Nagar Palika
- Elevation: 117 m (384 ft)

Population (2011)
  - Total: 63,073

Languages
  - Official: Gujarati, Hindi
- Time zone: UTC+5:30 (IST)
- PIN: 384315
- Telephone code: 02765
- Vehicle registration: GJ-2-

Visnagar is a city and a municipality in Mehsana district in the Indian state of Gujarat. Visnagar is also a taluka capital.

== History ==
"Visnagar" named after its founder king Visaladev from Ajmer Dynasty was founded in 953 on the auspicious day of 'Akhatrij'.

Founded just as an outpost of the kingdom of king Visaldeo surrounding the present 'Deliya Talao' a huge water tank covering an area of approx 2 lac sq. meter. As it was falling on a very strategic geographical location, Visnagar faced many war fights between Visaldeo, Babis, Ider dynasty and Gayakwads with change of rulers Visnagar so many changes and it grew with a fort wall with 6 gates none of them is present at this time but at some places, remains can be seen.

Visnagar Kasba Under Gayakwad rule, Visnagar become the first town in North Gujarat to have an underground water supply and sewerage system, Railway was also brought glory with it for the development of Visnagar with electricity.

Visnagar produced many freedom fighters during the time of the British Rule. Noted teachers, painters, drama artists, writers were also among those who highlighted Visnagar.

Visnagar City Industrial establishments like submersible pumps, thrashers, diamonds, and copper vessels drew attention nationwide. Industrial development, real estate development, education facilities, and medical facilities attract people from surrounding villages to come and stay here.

The city has a library named Parekh Vallabh Hemchand General Library, which is one of the oldest libraries of Gujarat. The library was established on 3rd March of 1878.

== Geography ==
Visnagar is located at 23.7°N 72.55°E at average elevation of 117 metres.

Earlier, Visnagar was known as "Copper City", because of the large number of workers who used to make pots from copper. It also has a big garden called "Doshabhai Garden". It is considered one of the major commercial centers of the Mehsana district. Visnagar is surround by many great places with religious and architectural importance like Ambaji (96 km), Becharaji (63 km), unjha (24 km), Mahudi (34 km), Patan (52 km), Modhera (44 km), Taranga (50 km) and Vadnagar. some of the best attractive places to visit near visnagar are Tirupati natural & Water park (8 km), Bliss Aqua world (27 km), Sankus water park & Resort (39 km), Tirupati Rushivan Adventure park (34 km). Visnagar is 20 km away from Mehsana Railway station and the nearest airport is at Ahmedabad (80 km)

== Demographics ==
As of 2001 India census, Visnagar had a population of 68,826. Males constitute 53% of the population and females 47%. Visnagar has an average literacy rate of 77%, male literacy is 82%, and female literacy is 71%.

== Education ==
=== Schools ===
Gujarati Medium Schools

- N.M. Nootan Sarva Vidyalaya, Visnagar
- Adarsh Vidhyalay, Visnagar
- D.D.parikh kanya vidhyalay
- G.D.High School, Visnagar
- Kanya Sala, Visnagar
- Navyug Shisuniketan, Visnagar
- Prakash Vidyalaya, Visnagar
- Sardar Patel High School, Visnagar
- School of Victors, Visnagar
- Gurukul School, Visnagar
- Galaxy

English Medium Schools

- Shri Sahajanand School, Visnagar

== Universities ==
- Sankalchand Patel University
- M. N. College, Visnagar

== Hospitals ==
- Kashiba Women's and Children's Hospital
- G D General Hospital
- Gokul orthopedic hospital
- Aakash Eye Hospital
- Sanjeevani Hospital
- Siddhivinayak Hospital
- MIMS Hospital
- Himani Hospital
- Sardar Patel Hospital
- Jyoti Nursing Home
- Upasna Hospital
- Narsinhbhai Patel Dental College & Hospital
- Vatsal Children Hospital and Jugal neonatal nursery
- Ridham Hospital for Women
- Amee Hospital
- Krishna Hospital
- Narsinhbhai Patel Medical College & Hospital

== Villages of Visnagar Taluka ==
Visnagar Bus Station

- Bakarpur
- Basana
- Becharpura
- Bhalak
- Bhandu
- Bokarvada
- Chhogala
- Chitroda Mota
- Chitrodipura
- Dadhiyal
- Denap
- Dhamanva
- Dharusana
- Ganpatpura
- Ghaghret
- Gothva
- Gunja
- Gunjala
- Hasanpur
- Iyasara
- Kada
- Kajialiyasana
- Kamalpur
- Kankupura
- Kamana
- Kansa
- Kansarakui
- Khadalpur
- Khandosan
- Kharvada
- Kiyadar
- Kuvasana
- Lachhadi
- Laxmipura
- Magroda
- Mahamadpur
- Megha Aliyasana
- Paldi
- Pudgam
- Rajgadh
- Ralisana
- Rampura
- Randala
- Rangakui
- Rangpur
- Ravalapura
- Saduthala
- Satusana
- Savala
- Sunshi
- Tarabh
- Thalota
- Thumthal
- Udalpur
- Umta
- Vadu
- Valam
- Visnagar
