= M. N. College, Visnagar =

College in Visnagar, Gujarat, India

Coordinates: 23.698948°N 72.539428°E

Maneklal Nanchand College is a government college in Visnagar, Mehsana district, Gujarat, India. Established in 1946, it is one of the oldest institutions of higher education in North Gujarat.

== History ==
M. N. College was established in 1946 with the financial assistance of Rs. 4 lakh from philanthropist Sheth Maneklal Nanchand, after whom the institution was named. At the time of its founding, the college was among the few higher educational institutions in the region and attracted students from parts of present-day North Gujarat and Rajasthan.

The founding principal of the college was Vinayaka Krishna Gokak. The campus was designed in a style inspired by the Maharaja Sayajirao University of Baroda and features elements of European institutional architecture.

== Campus ==
The campus of College is spread across approximately 45 acres in Visnagar. The institution is known for its heritage-style main building and tree-lined grounds.
