= Radheshyam Sharma =

Indian writer and poet (1936–2021)

- Born: Radheshyam Sitaram Sharma; 5 January 1936; Vavol, Gandhinagar, Gujarat, India
- Died: 9 September 2021 (aged 85); Ahmedabad, Gujarat, India
- Education: Bachelor of Arts
- Alma mater: Gujarat College
- Occupations: Poet, Novelist, Short story writer, Critic
- Spouse: Sharda Vyas (1952 - present)
- Writing career
- Language: Gujarati
- Notable works: Fero (1968); Swapnatirtha (1979)
- Notable awards: Kumar Suvarna Chandrak (2012); Ranjitram Suvarna Chandrak (2004); Dhanji Kanji Gandhi Suvarna Chandrak (1995)

Radheshyam Sharma (5 January 1936 – 9 September 2021) was an Indian Gujarati-language poet, novelist, short story writer, critic and editor from Gujarat, India. He is known in Gujarati literature for his experimental novels Fero (1968) and Swapnatirtha (1979). His other significant works include Aansu Ane Chandaranu (1963), and Gujarati Navalkatha (with Raghuvir Chaudhari; 1974), a work of literary criticism on Gujarati novels. He was awarded the Gujarati literary honours Ranjitram Suvarna Chandrak, in 2004, and Dhanji Kanji Gandhi Suvarna Chandrak, in 1995.

== Life ==
Radheshyam Sharma was born on 5 January 1936 to Sitaram and Chanchal Bahen, also known as Padmavati, in Vavol, a village in Gandhinagar district, Gujarat. His family came from Rupal village in north Gujarat. Sharma inherited his religious leanings from his father Sitaram, a priest. He completed a Bachelor of Arts degree in Gujarati and Psychology at Gujarat College in 1957, and studied towards a Master of Arts at the Gujarat University School of Languages but did not sit for examination due to writer's cramp. Like his father, a religious storyteller, he also delivered sermons from 1965 to 1983.

Radheshyam Sharma was editor of the religious periodical Dharmalok from 1965 to 1983. He was editor of Akram Vigyan, a religious monthly founded by Dada Bhagwan. He is also associated with the publishing house Akar Prakashan.

Radheshyam Sharma married Sharda Vyas in 1952, and they had three sons. He lived in Ahmedabad.

Sharma died on 9 September 2021.

== Works ==
Radheshyam Sharma's works reflect the new sensitivity and characteristics of contemporary writers.

His first publication was a short story called "Badsoorat". Sharma's short stories are characterized by brevity and unfamiliar subjects. Bichara, his first short story collection, was published in 1969, followed by Pavanpavdi (1977), Radheshyam Sharma Ni Shrestha Vartao (1984), Vartavaran (1986), Pehla Patthar Kaun Marega (1981), and Ghatanalok (2006).

The two novels Fero (1968) and Swapnatirtha (1979) established Radheshyam Sharma among the fiction writers of his generation.

His first anthology of poetry was Aansu Ane Chandarnu (1969). It was followed by Negatives of Eternity (in English) (1974), Sanchetna (1983), Nishkaran (1991), Sanpreshan (2002) and Akashni Uddayan Lipi (2006).

Sharma's critical works are Vaachana (1972), Gujarati Navalkatha (with Raghuveer Chaudhari) (1974), Samprat (1978), Kavitani Kala (1983), Aalokna (1989), Shabda Samaksha (1991), Karta Kruti Vimarsha (1992), Vivechan No Vidhi (1993), Ullekh (1993), Akshar (1995), Navalkatha Nirdesh, Vartavichar (2000), and Sahitya Sanket (2006).

The compilations he has published are Dalal Ni Pratinidhi Vartao (1971), Dhumketu Ni Bhavsrushti (with Mafat Ojha) (1973), Natak Vishe Dalal (1974), Navi Varta (1975), Samkaleen Gujarati Vartao (1986), Indradhanu 101 (1995), Paramparaparak Vartao (2006), Bhupat Vadodaria ni 27 Vartao, Shaksharo Shakshatkar Vol. I-XIII (1999-2008), Shrimad Bhagvat Mahima, Vedtirth (2005). His translated works include Apano Manviy Varaso (1978) and Ramayan.

== Recognition ==
Radheshyam Sharma was awarded the literary honours Kumar Suvarna Chandrak (Kumar Gold Medal) in 2012, Ranjitram Suvarna Chandrak (Ranjitram Gold Medal) in 2004, and Dhanji Kanji Gandhi Suvarna Chandrak (Dhanji Kanji Gandhi Gold Medal) in 1995, for his contributions to Gujarati literature. In 1987, he won the Critics Award for his short story collection Vartavaran. Sharma is also the recipient of the Anantrai Raval Award (1998), the Ashok Harsh Award (1999), and the Chandulal Selarka Award (2000). He has won prizes from the Gujarati Sahitya Parishad (Gujarati Literary Council) and the Gujarat Sahitya Akademi.

== See also ==
- List of Gujarati-language writers
