= Jayant Gadit =

- Born: Jayant Gokaldas Gadit; 26 November 1938; Kandivali, Mumbai
- Died: 29 May 2009 (aged 70); Vadodara, Gujarat
- Education: Gujarat University (B.A., M.A., Ph.D.)
- Occupations: Novelist, critic, professor
- Spouse: Manjula (m. 1963)
- Writing career
- Language: Gujarati
- Notable works: Avrut (1969); Shikhandi (1991)
- Notable awards: Dhanji Kanji Gandhi Suvarna Chandrak (2008)

Academic background
- Thesis: Nhanalalni Apadyagadya Rachanaoni Bhashanu Sahityik Adhyayan (1974)
- Doctoral advisor: Harivallabh Bhayani

Signature
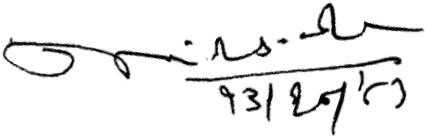

Jayant Gokaldas Gadit was a Gujarati novelist, critic and professor from Gujarat, India. He received the Dhanji Kanji Gandhi Suvarna Chandrak in 2008 and was awarded the Gujarat Sahitya Akademi prize twice.

== Life ==
Gadit was born on 26 November 1938 in Kandivali, Mumbai to Gokaldas Gadit and Santok. He studied Gujarati and Sanskrit at Gujarat University and received a Bachelor of Arts degree in 1961 and a Master of Arts degree in 1964. In 1974 he received his PhD under Harivallabh Bhayani. Gadit taught at the art colleges of Petlad and Mahudha from 1965 to 1977. He worked as a professor in the postgraduate department of Sardar Patel University from 1977 to 1986 and headed the Gujarati department there before retiring at the age of 60. He also worked as the Reader in K. L. Study Center, a research center of Gujarati Sahitya Parishad.

He married Manjula in 1963, and had two sons.

He died of cancer on 29 May 2009 in Vadodara, India.

== Works ==
He started his literary career with Avrut (1969), a novel which deals with the theme of corruption in the field of education, and presents the inner life of its central character. The dreams and symbols are used to depict the futility of life. He published two novellas in one volume entitled Chaspakshi ane Karna in 1979. In Chaspakshi, Gadit depicted the personal relationship of Mr. Panchal and Mrs. Soni, their sexual sensations and its psychological backgrounds. Badlati Kshitij (English: Changing Horizon) was published in 1986 and is based on the riots that ignited after anti-reservation protests. He started to write a novel of the life of Mahatma Gandhi, publishing three parts, but it was not completed due to his death. Kya Chhe Ghar? (1982) is a social novel, while Shikhandi (1991) is centered around the life of Shikhandi, a famous character from the Mahabharata. Prashanmu (2002) was inspired by the mass migration of Dalits of Sambarada village near Palanpur. Ek Aswapna Sukhi Jeevan (2003) is a social novel on family life. Satya (2010) was his last novel centered around Mahatma Gandhi. He also adapted the novel Shikhandi into a play of the same name.

Nhanalal Nu Apadyagadya (1976, originally his PhD thesis), Nhanalal (1977) and Navalkathama Vastavvad (1985; Realism in Novel), Aa Apni Katha (2000) are his volumes of criticism. He also helped in editing Gujarati Sahityakosh (Encyclopedia of Gujarati Literature Volume I (1990) and Anuadhunik Sahitya Sangnyakosh (1999). Mohit (1982) and Amulni Gauravgatha (1997) are his works of translation. Ek ne Ek Agyar (1994) is a collection of stories written with his wife, Manjula.

== Recognition ==
Gujarat Vidhya Sabha (a literary institution for the promotion of vernacular Gujarati literature and education) awarded him the Dhanji Kanji Gandhi Suvarna Chandrak (a literary honour in Gujarat) in 2008. He received the Gujarat Sahitya Akademi prize twice.
