= Purushottam Upadhyay =

Indian musician, singer and composer (1934–2024)

- Born: 15 August 1934; Uttarsanda, Kaira district, Bombay Presidency, British India
- Died: 11 December 2024 (aged 90); Mumbai, Maharashtra, India
- Occupations: Music composer, singer
- Known for: Gujarati semi-classical music
- Children: Two daughters
- Awards: Padma Shri (2017); Gaurav Puraskar

Purushottam Upadhyay (15 August 1934 – 11 December 2024) was an Indian musician, singer and composer who primarily worked in Gujarati and Hindi languages. He was well known in Gujarati semi-classical music and composed music for over 20 films and 30 plays. He was awarded the Padma Shri in 2017.

== Life and career ==
Upadhyay was born on 15 August 1934 in Uttarsanda (now in Kheda district, Gujarat, India), had an interest in music from his childhood. His singing passion developed alongside his interest in listening music. He won numerous awards for performances during his school days. Without informing his family, he left his hometown to pursue a career in music in Bombay (now Mumbai) but returned due to lack of opportunities. He started working in Gujarati theatre companies and acted in supporting roles.

He came to attention of theatre actor Ashraf Khan when he sang a song originally performed by Noor Jehan. He returned to Bombay. With the recommendation of Ashraf Khan, he secured a singing contract with All India Radio, Bombay. He also started gaining minor opportunities in the music industry. He developed personal connections with several artists, including Amirbai Karnataki, Alla Rakha, Dilip Dholakia, and Avinash Vyas. Under guidance of Vyas, he organized music programs at Bharatiya Vidya Bhavan and also taught at music classes there in Vyas's absence. He also studied classical music from Navrang Nagpurkar.

Upadhyay conducted solo music performances in India and abroad. Apart from singing in Gujarati Sugam Sangeet (semi-classical music), he sang ghazals. He worked with Kalyanji–Anandji where he gained experience as a music composer. He composed music for playback singers such as Lata Mangeshkar, Asha Bhosle, and Mohammed Rafi. In the domain of Gujarati Sugam Sangeet, Hansa Dave was among the singers who performed under his direction.

He composed music for more than 20 films and 30 plays. His well known Gujarati songs include "He Ranglo Jamyo", "Divaso Judaina Jay Che", "Ae Jaashe Jarur Milan Sudhi", "Have Mandir Na Barana", "Mari Koi Dalkhi Ma" and "Kahu Chu Jawanine".

Upadhyay had two daughters. He died in Mumbai on 11 December 2024, at the age of 90.

== Recognition ==
The Government of Gujarat honoured him with the Gaurav Puraskar for his contributions to Gujarati music. In 2017, he received the Padma Shri from the Government of India.

== Filmography ==
Upadhyay composed, co-composed, or sang songs for following films:

- Liludi Dharati (1968, Gujarati)
- Taqdeer (1983, Hindi)
