= Ahmedabad University =

Private university in Ahmedabad, India

- Seal of Ahmedabad University
- Type: Private university
- Established: 2009
- Founders: Kasturbhai Lalbhai (Founder)
- Parent institution: Ahmedabad Education Society
- Chancellor: Sanjay Lalbhai
- Vice-Chancellor: Pankaj Chandra
- Location: Ahmedabad, Gujarat, 380009, India; 23.0390°N 72.5560°E
- Website: ahduni.edu.in

Ahmedabad University is a private research university located in Gujarat, India. Established in 2009 by the Ahmedabad Education Society, it comprises six schools and ten centres. The university offers a liberal education focused on interdisciplinary learning, research thinking, and experiential learning. Ahmedabad University provides diverse programmes across the humanities, arts, natural sciences, social sciences, engineering, and management.

== History ==
Ahmedabad University was established by the Ahmedabad Education Society (AES), a non-profit educational foundation that has founded several prominent Indian academic institutions. The University's foundation is rooted in the vision of Kasturbhai Lalbhai, a distinguished figure in the Indian textile industry, and is guided by the motto of continuous progress of self and society.

Ahmedabad University's governance structure includes a Board of Governors comprising industry and academic leaders. As of 2025, the Board includes Sanjay Lalbhai (Chancellor, Chairman, and Managing Director of Arvind Limited) and Pankaj Chandra (Vice Chancellor), in addition to Naushad Forbes (Co-Chairman of Forbes Marshall), Punit Lalbhai (Vice Chairman of Arvind Limited), Sudhir Mehta (Chairman Emeritus of Torrent Group), Naishadh Parikh (Chairman and Managing Director of Equinox Solutions Ltd.), and Pankaj Patel (Chairman and Managing Director of Zydus Lifesciences), among others.

The Board of Governors, along with the University's deans and an academic board of scholars, oversee academic decisions, curriculum development, research initiatives, and other university-related matters.

== Campus ==
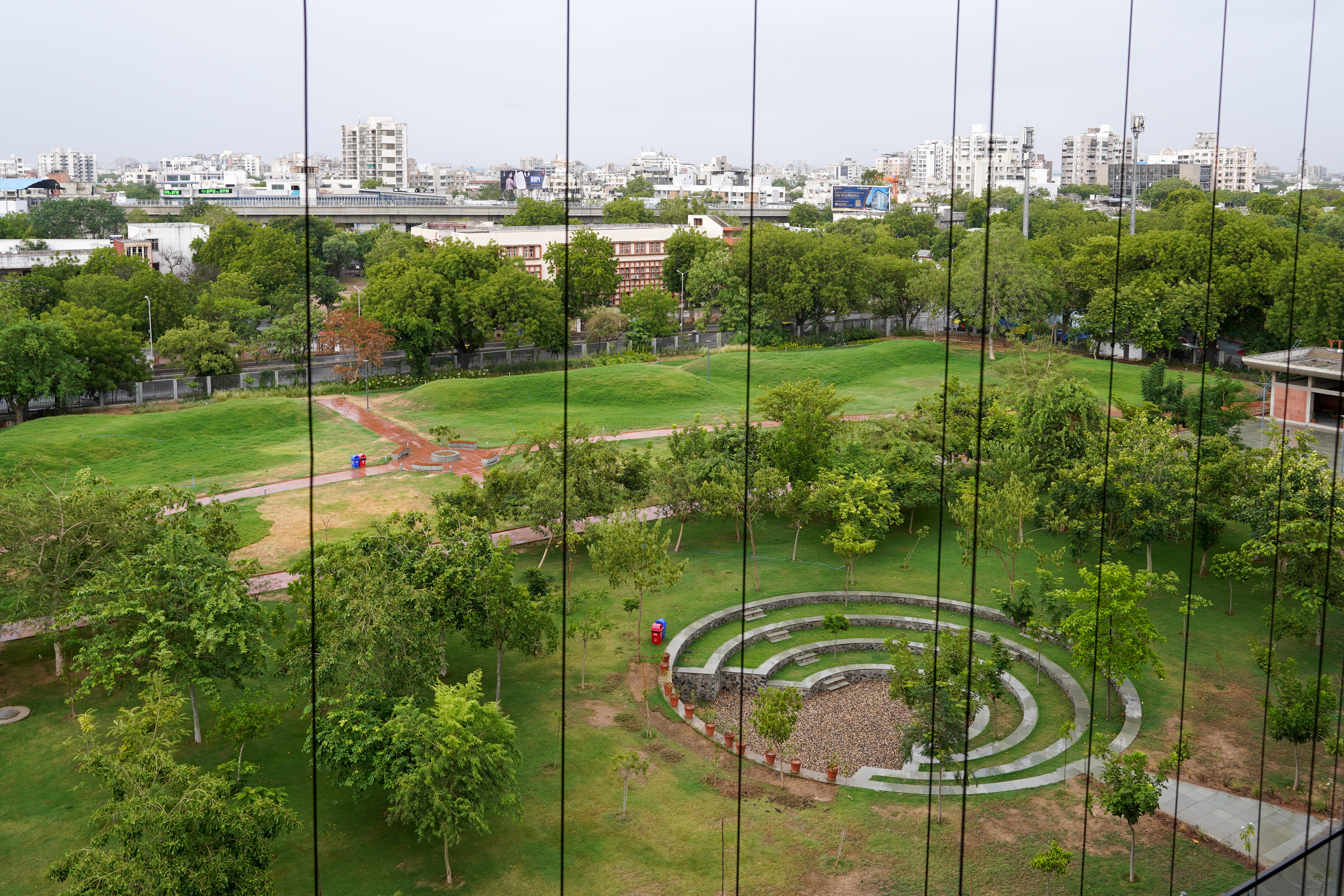
Aerial view of Stepwell from The School of Arts and Sciences

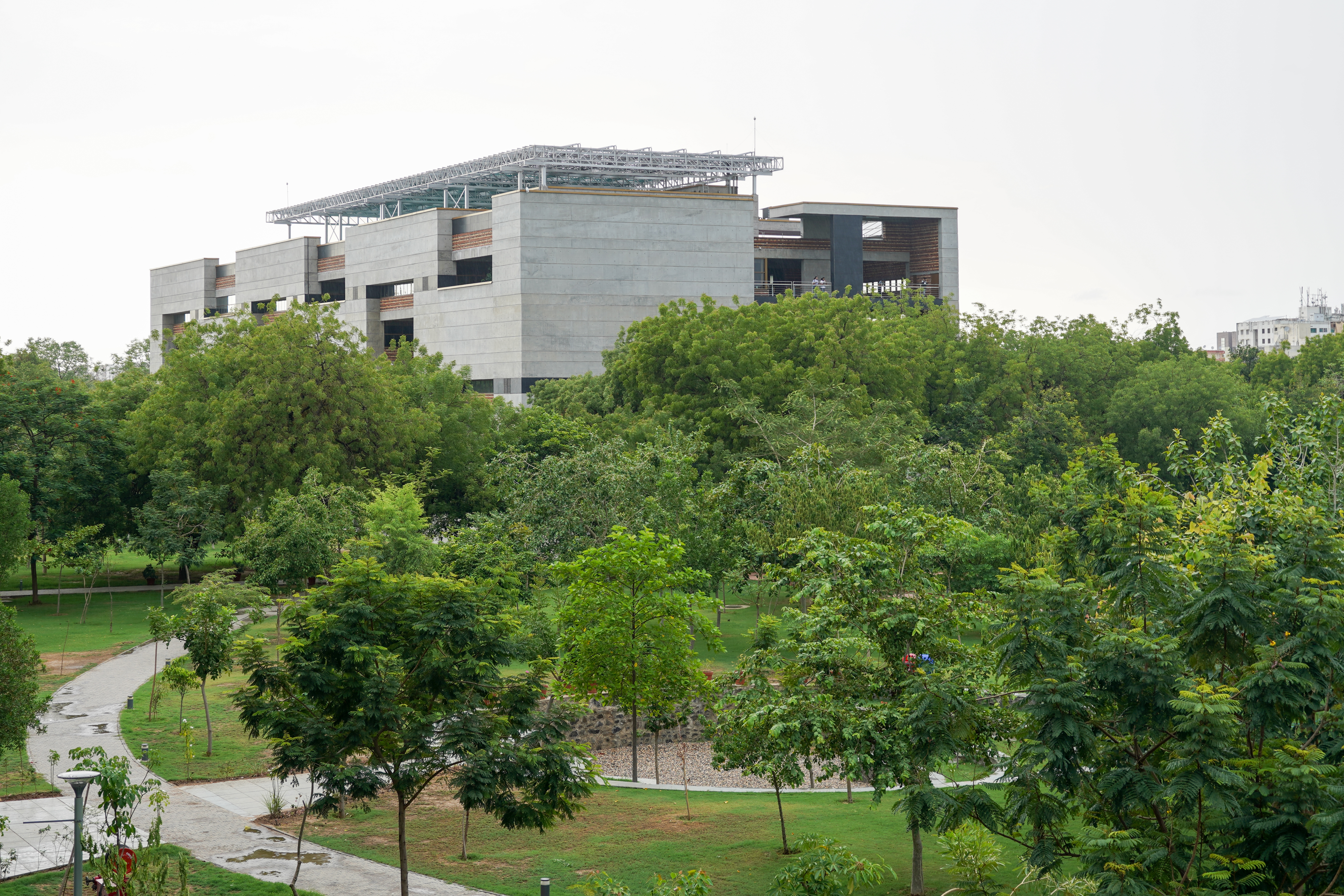
Arboretum and University Centre

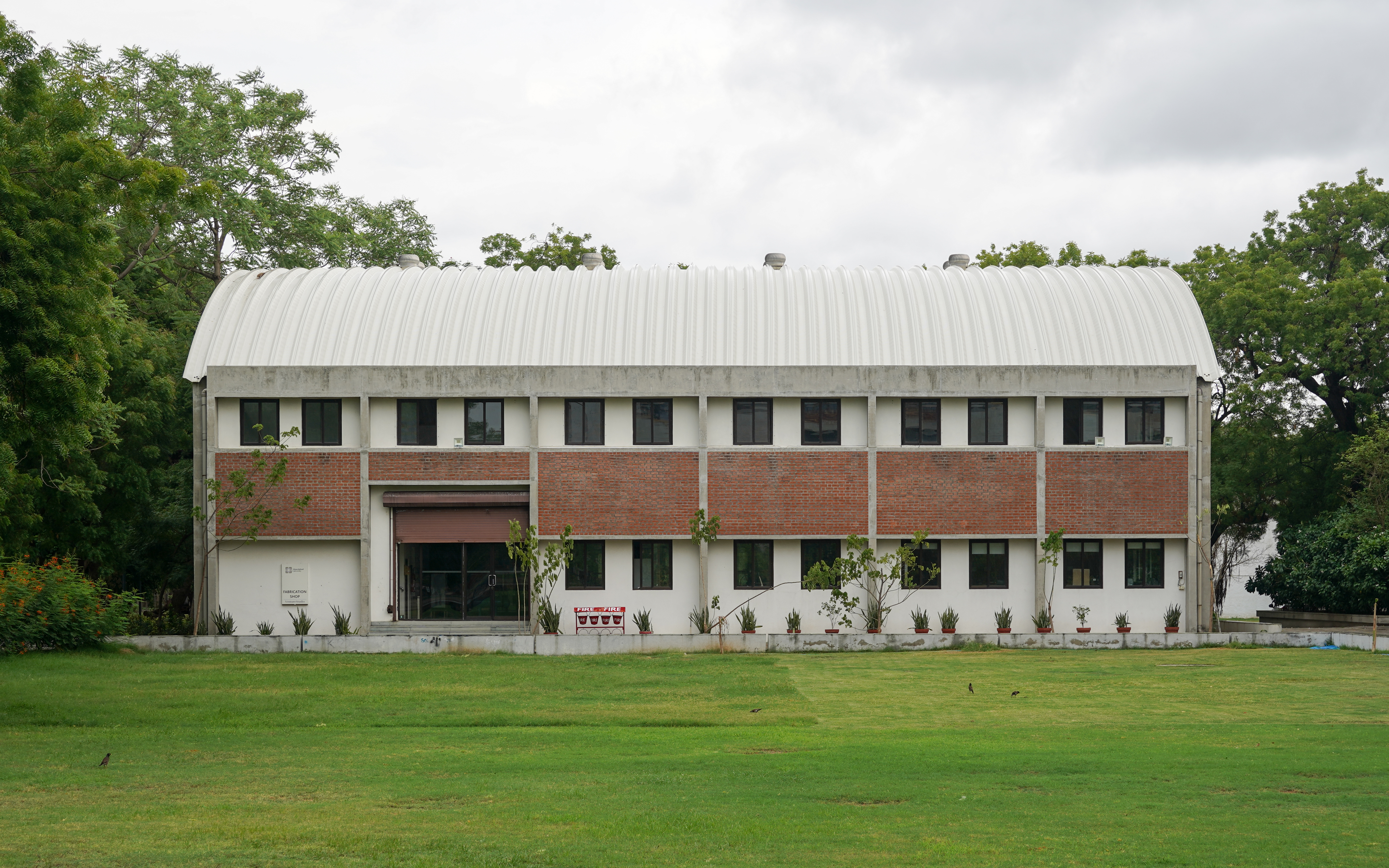
Fabrication Lab

The Ahmedabad University campus is situated in the Navrangpura area of Ahmedabad, Gujarat, India, often referred to as the "University Area." The 158-acre campus features the internationally recognised University Centre, an urban forest with diverse flora and fauna, seven cafeterias, and various academic resources, including laboratories, high-performance computing system, and libraries.

Ahmedabad University provides comprehensive student facilities, encompassing on-campus accommodation, sports facilities, recreational spaces, and a wellness center. Ahmedabad University is an eco-friendly campus that has implemented sustainability strategies to mitigate the effects of extreme heat, reduce water runoff, and expand green spaces for the university community and surrounding area.

== Academics ==
=== Undergraduate programmes ===
The university provides multidisciplinary undergraduate programmes in arts, sciences, humanities, technology, and management. A mandatory Foundation Programme, consisting of four studio courses focused on diverse aspects of society, precedes major declaration. All undergraduate students are encouraged to undertake a capstone project or engage in undergraduate research project to develop academic research skills. These undergraduate programmes offer students the flexibility to choose from a variety of courses to make learning interdisciplinary.

=== Graduate programmes ===
Ahmedabad University offers interdisciplinary, research-driven, and practice-oriented graduate degrees. Current offerings include programmes in business administration, heritage management, economics, and quantitative finance], and technology with specialisations composites, computer science and engineering, and microelectronics and semiconductors.

=== Doctoral programmes ===
The university provides interdisciplinary PhD programmes in management, arts and sciences, engineering and applied science, and public health.

=== Continuing education and executive programmes ===
Ahmedabad University offers continuing education and executive programmes designed for professionals. These programmes include the Global Executive Master of Business Administration in Pharmaceutical Management, Transforming R&D in Indian Firms, and the GROW Executive General Management Programme. These programmes aim to provide advanced knowledge and skills for career advancement.

=== Certificate programmes ===
Ahmedabad University offers certificate programmes that enable participants to enhance their professional portfolios. Current offerings include programmes in business analytics, financial analysis, digital marketing, physiotherapy for the visually impaired, translation and creative writing, and composites.

== Admissions and scholarships ==
Admission to Ahmedabad University's programmes requires the submission of an application form. For undergraduate programmes, applicants are evaluated based on their Grade XII test scores, application materials, and a personal interview. Graduate programme admissions consider applicants' academic performance in prior graduate studies, competitive examination scores (where applicable), application materials, and a personal interview. The university employs a holistic review process to assess applicants' fit with the University's culture and academic environment.

=== Scholarships ===
Ahmedabad University offers both merit-based and need-based scholarships to eligible students.

== Awards and recognitions ==
- Recognised by the Government of Gujarat as a Centre of Excellence
- Accredited with an 'A' grade by the National Assessment and Accreditation Council (NAAC)
- Awarded a 5-star rating, one of the highest awarded in the Gujarat State Institutional Rating Framework (GSIRF) for 2021-22 by the Knowledge Consortium of Gujarat (KCG), Department of Education, Government of Gujarat
- Recognised by the UGC under Section 12(B) of the UGC Act, making it one of the few private research universities to have been awarded this recognition for select research universities
- Recognised as a Highly Commended University for Teaching and Learning Strategy of the Year in the Times Higher Education (THE) Awards Asia 2023
- Awarded the Association to Advance Collegiate Schools of Business (AACSB) Innovations That Inspire Award 2023 for its Foundation Programme
- Awarded Platinum Rating by the Indian Green Building Council for achieving the Green Building Standards at our University Centre
- Awarded the Royal Institute of British Architects (RIBA) International Award for Excellence 2024 for our University Centre
- Ranked 6th in India and 18th in South Asia for climate action in the Times Higher Education (THE) Impact Rankings 2024.
- The Times Higher Education Awards Asia 2025 recognised Ahmedabad University as the Leadership and Management Team of the Year in April 2025.
- Ahmedabad University's University Centre received an Honourable Mention at The International Architecture Award in August 2025, conferred by The Chicago Athenaeum: Museum of Architecture and Design and The European Centre for Architecture, Art, Design and Urban Studies.
- The Government of Gujarat recognised Ahmedabad University as a Centre for Excellence (CoE) for a period of six years, marking the second consecutive recognition.
- Ahmedabad University's High-Performance Computing (HPC) system, Stepwell, ranks among India's top 50 HPC systems, according to the Centre for Development of Advanced Computing (CDAC), Bangalore.

== Schools ==
=== Amrut Mody School of Management ===
Amrut Mody School of Management at Ahmedabad University.

=== Bagchi School of Public Health ===
The Bagchi School of Public Health.

=== School of Arts and Sciences ===
The School of Arts and Sciences follows a pedagogical approach. The School has five academic divisions: Biological and Life Sciences, Humanities and Languages, Mathematical and Physical Sciences, Performing and Visual Arts, and Social Sciences.

=== School of Engineering and Applied Science ===
The School of Engineering and Applied Science delivers undergraduate and graduate engineering programmes.

== Research centres ==
=== International Centre for Space and Cosmology ===
The Centre works in collaboration nationally and globally with colleagues having related interests.

=== Physiotherapy College for the Visually Impaired ===
The Centre, spanning two campuses – the Blind People's Association and the School for the Deaf and Mute Society, supports the programme in physiotherapy with resources.

=== Sahyog: Centre for Promoting Health ===
Ahmedabad University’s Bagchi School of Public Health partnered with the Self Employed Women’s Association (SEWA) to establish Sahyog: Centre for Promoting Health. The collaboration combines strengths in health promotion, research, training, epidemiology, community empowerment, and outreach.

=== The Climate Institute ===
The Climate Institute at Ahmedabad University facilitates the development of solutions for climate, energy, and environmental challenges in the Global South by integrating local, national, and international resources. The Centre achieves this through education, research, and strategic partnerships, accelerating the implementation of innovative and impactful solutions.

=== VentureStudio ===
VentureStudio, the innovation and startup incubation centre at Ahmedabad University, was established in collaboration with Stanford University Design School in 2011. Since its inception, the Centre has supported over 150 startups in diverse science and technology domains such as Healthcare, BioTechnology, Life Sciences, Medical Devices, Diagnostics, Engineering, Agriculture, Fintech, Hardware, Industry 4.0, and Enterprise Software, among others. In 2017, the Department of BioTechnology chose the Centre to support BioIncubation activities in Gujarat.

== Collaborations ==
Ahmedabad University has entered into collaborations with several international research universities for academic development. These include:

- Stanford University's Center for Design Research to help develop an entrepreneurial ecosystem through VentureStudio
- Olin College of Engineering, USA for accelerating project-based learning specifically in the School of Engineering and Applied Science.
- University of Valladolid, Spain and University of Ferrara, Italy for working with the Centre for Heritage Management in developing programmes and research activities in the area of heritage. University of Bradford to promote student and faculty exchange and joint research.
- Rennes School of Business, France and Amrut Mody School of Management for students' exchange of BBA and Integrated MBA programmes.
- MoU between Rady School of Management at University of California, San Diego and Amrut Mody School of Management for close cooperation.
- MoU with Bronx Community College (BCC) of the City University of New York (CUNY) to promote and develop academic cooperation, including student exchanges, summer schools and faculty-led programmes, and joint research, conferences, and workshops.
- MoU with the University of Sussex Business School and the Centre for Technology, Innovation and Economic Research (CTIER) in Pune, India to further mutual interests in education and academic research between the UK and India.
- School of Engineering and Applied Science at Ahmedabad University partnered with Ahmedabad Textile Industry’s Research Association (ATIRA) have joined hands to advance education, research and development, and provide services to the industries in these domains.
- MoU with the International Financial Services Centres Authority (IFSCA) focusing on talent development, research, and startup support within the fields of fintech and international financial services.
- MoU with the Madras Diabetes Research Foundation (MDRF) in Chennai to enhance national and global health through collaborative research and training, focusing on facilitating doctoral research initiatives.
- School of Engineering and Applied Science at Ahmedabad University signed an MoU with the Composites Excellence Center of Asia (CECA) to create a highly qualified workforce in composites, including design evolution, research and development, creation of tool designs, and promotion of appropriate manufacturing methodology.
- School of Engineering and Applied Science at Ahmedabad University signed an MoU with KUKA India Pvt Ltd. to establish the Advanced Industrial Robotic Centre of Excellence at the varsity campus, enhancing academic prowess, training, and industry-academia collaboration.
- MoU with Physical Research Laboratory to promote joint research initiatives, academic exchange, and access to resources and facilities.
- A consortium of Ahmedabad University, IIT Gandhinagar, and UC San Diego, in partnership with Gujarat International Finance Tec-City (GIFT City), launched the GIFT International Fintech Institute (GIFT IFI) to establish India as a global leader in fintech by delivering advanced training and research programmes.
- The collaboration with the University of Bergamo advances interdisciplinary research, entrepreneurship, sustainability, and heritage studies. A structured ten-point agenda drives faculty–student exchanges, joint programmes, and an SME corridor linking businesses across both cities. The universities also plan civic engagement between the Mayors, strengthening cultural and educational ties.

== Notable faculty ==
Ahmedabad University's faculty comprises approximately 200 academics and industry professionals with expertise in management, technology, humanities, arts, public health, and related fields.

=== Management ===
- Chakravarthi Rangarajan
- Priyadarshi Shukla
- Ramadhar Singh

=== Arts and Sciences ===
- Kunal Basu
- Pankaj Joshi
- Balaji Prakash
- Deepan Sivaraman

=== Engineering ===
- Ashitava Ghosal
- Sanjay Chaudhari
- Timothy Gonsalves

== Student life ==
=== Housing ===
Student residencies offer comfortable, safe, and secure living accommodations that foster a sense of community and celebrate diversity in ideas, lifestyles, and cultural practices.

=== Athletics ===
Ahmedabad University offers a comprehensive sports and games programme. Activities available include indoor and outdoor sports such as basketball, badminton, chess, cricket, carom, football, frisbee, shooting, table tennis, tennis, and volleyball. The University Centre features a gymnasium with modern equipment and a trained instructor.

=== Student Organisations ===
Ahmedabad University has nearly 30 student clubs and associations, designed to facilitate participation in co-curricular, academic, and social events. These enhance the student experience, enabling students to develop their skills, pursue interests, and build networks.

=== Student Support ===
The university's Circle of Care programme provides incoming students with a support network consisting of faculty advisors, senior student mentors, and peer groups. This programme aims to assist students with their transition to university life by offering academic and personal guidance. The university counsellor and career development centre provide additional support.

=== Career Development Centre ===
Ahmedabad University's Career Development Centre assists graduating students in preparing for professional careers.

Ahmedabad University student community comprises 4000 students with more than 100 students pursuing PhD.
