= Sanjay Chaudhary (writer) =

Indian writer and computer scientist

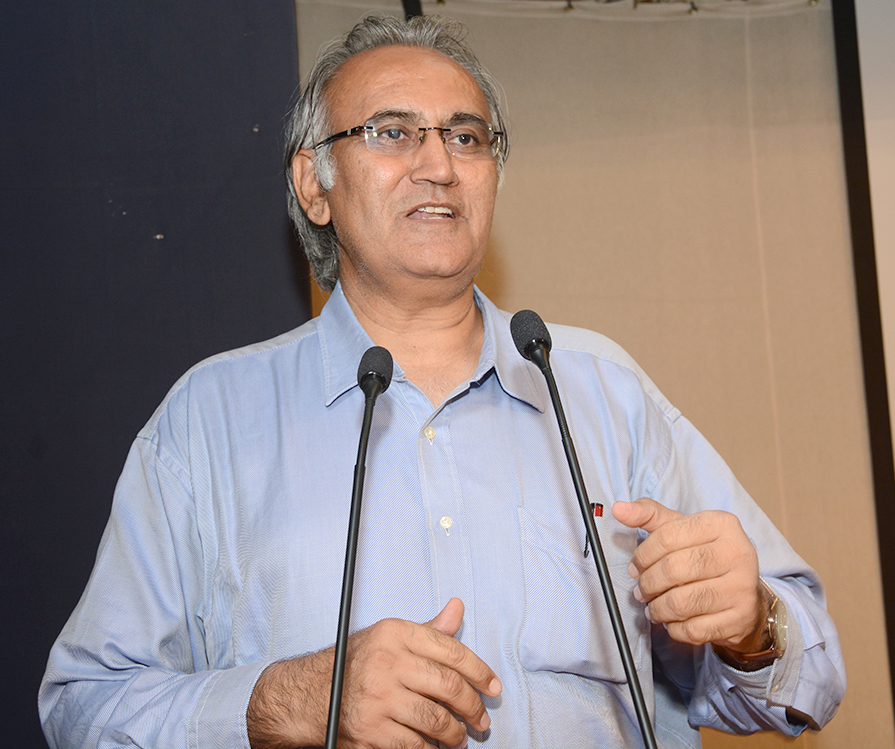
- Sanjay Chaudhary at Gujarat Vishwakosh Trust, Ahmedabad; July 2018
- Born: 25 April 1963 (age 63); Ahmedabad, Gujarat, India
- Occupations: Writer, professor, and computer scientist
- Parent(s): Raghuveer Chaudhary (father); Parubahen Chaudhary (mother)

Academic background
- Education: Gujarat Vidyapith; Gujarat University
- Thesis: Crop Production Information System: Analysis, Design and Information Presentation (2004)
- Doctoral advisor: Bharatbhai Buddhadev

Academic work
- Discipline: Computer Science
- Sub-discipline: Cloud computing, Distributed computing, Big data analytics, Blockchain technology, ICT applications in agriculture
- Institutions: Ahmedabad University
- Website: ahduni.edu.in/seas/people/faculty/sanjay-chaudhary

Sanjay Raghuveer Chaudhary (born 25 April 1963) is an Indian writer, professor, and computer scientist from Gujarat, India. He is a professor of computer science at Ahmedabad University, Ahmedabad. He has authored several books in Gujarati and English. His literary work Girnar (2009) received Gujarat Sahitya Akademi's Best Book Prize in Essays and Travelogue category. He has published and edited several books on computer science. He is a senior member of Institute of Electrical and Electronics Engineers (IEEE).

== Biography ==
Sanjay Chaudhary was born on 25 April 1963 in Ahmedabad to his parents Raghuveer Chaudhary, renowned Gujarati writer, and Parubahen.

After completing his schooling from Sheth Chimanlal Nagindas Vidyalaya in 1980, Chaudhary joined St. Xavier's College, Ahmedabad from where he received his BA in Economics in 1983. He received his MA in economics in 1985 and post-graduate diploma in Computer Science and Applications in 1986 from Gujarat University. He received M.Phil. and Ph.D. in computer science from Gujarat Vidyapith in 1996 and 2004 respectively. He submitted his doctoral dissertation, Crop Production Information System: Analysis, Design and Information Presentation, under Bharatbhai Buddhadev.

He married Sunita in 1988.

== Career ==
Chaudhary joined Gujarat University's Department of Computer Science in 1987 and continued there till 2001. From 2001 to 2013, he worked at Dhirubhai Ambani Institute of Information and Communication Technology (DA-IICT), Gandhinagar as a professor and as a dean of Academic Programs. Sanjay was one of the founding faculty members of DA-IICT. In 2013, he joined Ahmedabad University as a professor, and worked there as Associate Dean of School of Engineering and Applied Science (2016–2019). As of 2020, he is the interim dean of School of Engineering and Applied Science.

He writes a weekly column titled Technology Ne Tirethi (English: On the Banks of Technology) in NavGujarat Samay, a Gujarati daily. The column is based on Information Technology.

== Works ==
=== Literary works ===
Chaudhary published his book Girnar in 2009, which is a travelogue and collection of articles on mount Girnar, located at Junagadh. The book provides historical, geographical, cultural and archaeological details on Girnar. It presents the history of Junagadh, its flora and fauna, and folk-literature. Chaudhary is also a short story writer; his short stories have appeared in several prestigious Gujarati magazines including Shabdasrishti, Kumar, and Parab.

=== Research ===
Chaudhary's research focuses on cloud computing, distributed computing, big data analytics, blockchain technology, ICT applications in agriculture.

Chaudhary has investigated, demonstrated, and advocated the use of Geo-spatial analytics for developing multidisciplinary applications, helping in planning, managing and utilizing natural resources efficiently using spatial analysis. Along with his research fellows, he worked on common standards for data integration and effective analytical infrastructure and integrated standards defined by Open Geospatial Consortium for big data processing of spatial data. He proposed open source framework to integrate various types of data, perform geo-spatial analytics, and generate recommendations for the users involved in Agriculture.

== Awards ==
Chaudhary won Gujarat Sahitya Akademi's Best Book prize for his book Girnar in Essays and Travelogue category for the year 2009. The Institute of Electrical and Electronics Engineers (IEEE) awarded him Senior Membership in 2010.

== Selected publications ==
- Chaudhary, Sanjay; Somani, Gaurav; Buyya, Rajkumar, eds. (2017). Research Advances in Cloud Computing. Springer. ISBN 978-981-10-5025-1.
- Madria, Sanjay; Fournier-Viger, Philippe; Chaudhary, Sanjay; Reddy, P. Krishna, eds. (2019). Big Data Analytics: 7th International Conference, BDA 2019, Ahmedabad, India, December 17–20, 2019, Proceedings. Springer. ISBN 978-3-030-37188-3.

Gujarati books

- Soni, R. P.; Chaudhary, Sanjay (1992). સુનિયોજિત કોબૉલ [Structured COBOL] (in Gujarati). New Delhi: Tata-McGraw Hill Publishing Company Ltd. ISBN 9780074624296.
- Soni, R. P.; Chaudhary, Sanjay; Patel, H. M. (1995). અંગત કોમ્પ્યુટર અને D.O.S. પેકેજીસ [Personal Computer and DOS Packages] (in Gujarati). New Delhi: Tata-McGraw Hill Publishing Company Ltd. ISBN 9780074624456.
- Soni, R. P.; Chaudhary, Sanjay (1999). માહિતી ટેકનોલોજી વિકાસ અને વિનિયોગ [Information Technology: Development and Applications] (in Gujarati). Ahmedabad: Nirav Prakashan.
- Chaudhary, Sanjay (2019). Upervas Vishe ઉપરવાસ વિશે [About Uparvas, a Trilogy by Raghuveer Chaudhary] (in Gujarati). Ahmedabad: Rangdwar Prakashan. ISBN 9788193734889.
