= Pankaj Joshi =

Pankaj Joshi may refer to:

- Pankaj Joshi (cricketer)
- Pankaj Joshi (physicist)
