= Agricultural robot =

Robot deployed for agricultural purposes

An agricultural robot is a robot deployed for agricultural purposes. The main area of application of robots in agriculture today is at the harvesting stage. Emerging applications of robots or drones in agriculture include weed control, planting seeds, harvesting, environmental monitoring and soil analysis. According to a 2025 study, the agricultural robot market is expected to reach US$170 billion by 2032.

== General ==
Fruit picking robots, driverless tractor / sprayers, and sheep shearing robots are designed to replace human labor. In most cases, a lot of factors have to be considered (e.g., the size and color of the fruit to be picked) before the commencement of a task. Robots can be used for other horticultural tasks such as pruning, weeding, spraying, etc. In addition to the physical task, many robots may also have sensors that collect data which may later be used to monitor different aspects of the crop, such as its health, pest and disease control, etc.

Robots can also be used in livestock applications (livestock robotics) such as automatic milking, washing and castrating. Robots like these have many benefits for the agricultural industry, including a higher quality of fresh produce, lower production costs, and a decreased need for manual labor. They can also be used to automate manual tasks, such as weed or bracken spraying, where the use of tractors and other human-operated vehicles is too dangerous for the operators.

== Designs ==
In general, the mechanical design consists of an end effector, manipulator, and gripper. Several factors must be considered in the design of the manipulator, including the task, economic efficiency, and required motions. However, the designs of agricultural robots are as diverse as the purposes they serve. For example, the design of a robot that spreads herbicide has little in common with a robot that milks cows.

=== End effector ===
An end effector in a robot is the device found at the end of the robotic arm, used for various agricultural operations. Several different kinds of end effectors have been developed. In an agricultural operation involving grapes in Japan, end effectors were developed for harvesting, berry-thinning, spraying, and bagging. The following designs, though proven efficient in laboratory and field experiments, have yet to be applied commercially.

Each end effector was designed according to the nature of the task and the shape and size of the target fruit. For instance, the end effectors used for harvesting were designed to grasp, cut, and push the bunches of grapes.

Berry thinning is another operation performed on the grapes, and is used to enhance the market value of the grapes, increase the grapes' size, and facilitate the bunching process. For berry thinning, an end effector consists of an upper, middle, and lower part. The upper part has two plates and a rubber that can open and close. The two plates compress the grapes to cut off the rachis branches and extract the bunch of grapes. The middle part contains a plate of needles, a compression spring, and another plate which has holes spread across its surface. When the two plates compress, the needles punch holes through the grapes. Next, the lower part has a cutting device which can cut the bunch to standardize its length.

For spraying, the end effector consists of a spray nozzle that is attached to a manipulator. In practice, producers want to ensure that the chemical liquid is evenly distributed across the bunch. Thus, the design allows for an even distribution of the chemical by making the nozzle move at a constant speed while keeping distance from the target.

The final step in grape production is the bagging process. The bagging end effector is designed with a bag feeder and two mechanical fingers. In the bagging process, the bag feeder is composed of slits which continuously supply bags to the fingers in an up and down motion. While the bag is being fed to the fingers, two leaf springs that are located on the upper end of the bag hold the bag open. The bags are produced to contain the grapes in bunches. Once the bagging process is complete, the fingers open and release the bag. This shuts the leaf springs, which seal the bag and prevent it from opening again.

=== Gripper ===
The gripper is a grasping device that is used for harvesting the target crop. Design of the gripper is based on simplicity, low cost, and effectiveness. Thus, the design usually consists of two mechanical fingers that are able to move in synchrony when performing their task. Specifics of the design depend on the task that is being performed. For example, in a procedure that required plants to be cut for harvesting, the gripper was equipped with a sharp blade.

=== Manipulator ===
The manipulator allows the gripper and end effector to navigate through their environment. The manipulator consists of four-bar parallel links that maintain the gripper's position and height. The manipulator also can utilize one, two, or three pneumatic actuators. Pneumatic actuators are motors which produce linear and rotary motion by converting compressed air into energy. The pneumatic actuator is the most effective actuator for agricultural robots because of its high power-weight ratio. The most cost efficient design for the manipulator is the single actuator configuration, yet this is the least flexible option.

== Development ==
The first development of robotics in agriculture can be dated as early as the 1920s, with research to incorporate automatic vehicle guidance into agriculture beginning to take shape. This research led to the advancements between the 1950s and 60s of autonomous agricultural vehicles. The concept was not perfect however, with the vehicles still needing a cable system to guide their path. Robots in agriculture continued to develop as technologies in other sectors began to develop as well. It was not until the 1980s, following the development of the computer, that machine vision guidance became possible.

Other developments over the years included the harvesting of oranges using a robot both in France and the US.

While robots have been incorporated in indoor industrial settings for decades, outdoor robots for the use of agriculture are considered more complex and difficult to develop. This is due to concerns over safety, but also over the complexity of picking crops subject to different environmental factors and unpredictability.

=== Demand in the market ===
There are concerns over the amount of labor the agricultural sector needs. With an aging population, Japan is unable to meet the demands of the agricultural labor market. Similarly, the United States currently depends on a large number of immigrant workers, but between the decrease in seasonal farmworkers and increased efforts to stop immigration by the government, they too are unable to meet the demand. Businesses are often forced to let crops rot due to an inability to pick them all by the end of the season. Additionally, there are concerns over the growing population that will need to be fed over the next years. Because of this, there is a large desire to improve agricultural machinery to make it more cost efficient and viable for continued use.

=== Current applications and trends ===
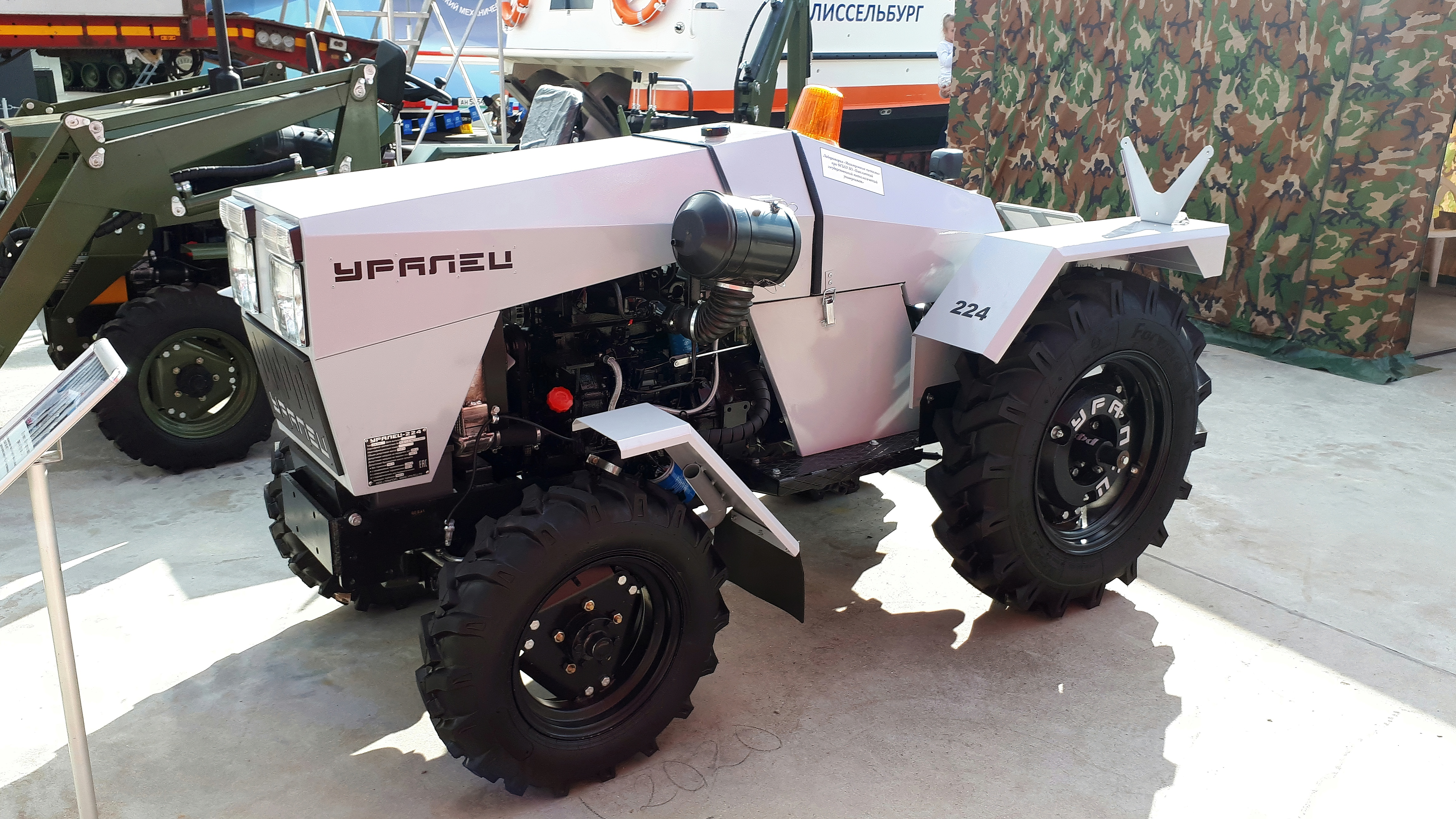
Unmanned tractor "Uralets-224"

Much of the current research continues to work towards autonomous agricultural vehicles. This research is based on the advancements made in driver-assist systems and self-driving cars.

While robots have already been incorporated in many areas of agricultural farm work, they are still largely missing in the harvest of various crops. This has started to change as companies begin to develop robots that complete more specific tasks on the farm. The biggest concern over robots harvesting crops comes from harvesting soft crops such as strawberries which can easily be damaged or missed entirely. Despite these concerns, progress in this area is being made. According to Gary Wishnatzki, the co-founder of Harvest Croo Robotics, one of their strawberry pickers currently being tested in Florida can "pick a 25-acre field in just three days and replace a crew of about 30 farm workers". Similar progress is being made in harvesting apples, grapes, and other crops. In the case of apple harvesting robots, current developments have been too slow to be commercially viable. Modern robots are able to harvest apples at a rate of one every five to ten seconds while the average human harvests at a rate of one per second.

Another goal being set by agricultural companies involves the collection of data. There are rising concerns over the growing population and the decreasing labor available to feed them. Data collection is being developed as a way to increase productivity on farms. AgriData is currently developing new technology to do just this and help farmers better determine the best time to harvest their crops by scanning fruit trees.

== Applications ==
=== Weed control / pest control / herbicide application ===
- Weed control using lasers (e.g. LaserWeeder by Carbon Robotics)
- Luna robots by TRIC Robotics use ultraviolet-C light to damage the DNA of pests, and vacuum up insects
- Precision agriculture robots applying low amounts of herbicides and fertilizers with precision while mapping plant locations
- Blue River Technology has developed a farm implement for a tractor which only sprays plants that require spraying, reducing herbicide use by 90%
- Lettuce Bot - Organic Weed Elimination and Thinning of Lettuce
- The IBEX autonomous weed spraying robot for extreme terrain, under development
- ecoRobotix has made a solar-powered weeding and spraying robot

=== Picking / harvest ===
- Picking robots are under development
- Vinobot and Vinoculer
- Burro, a carrying and path following robot with the potential to expand into picking and phytopathology
- Harvest Automation is a company founded by former iRobot employees to develop robots for greenhouses
- Small Robot Company developed a range of small agricultural robots, each one being focused on a particular task (weeding, spraying, drilling holes, ...) and controlled by an AI system

=== Seeding / planting ===
- Agreenculture
- Polly+, a robot by Arugga AI Farming for pollinating tomato flowers in greenhouses
- Rice planting robot developed by the Japanese National Agricultural Research Centre

=== Multipurpose / general / other ===
- ROS Agriculture, an open source software for agricultural robots using the Robot Operating System
- FarmBot, an open source computer numerical control (CNC) farming project
- VAE, under development by an Argentinean ag-tech startup, aims to become a universal platform for multiple agricultural applications, from precision spraying to livestock handling
- Australian Centre for Field Robotics (ACFR) RIPPA, for spot spraying
- ACFR SwagBot, for livestock monitoring
- ACFR Digital Farmhand, for spraying, weeding and seeding
- Thorvald, an autonomous modular multi-purpose agricultural robot developed by Saga Robotics.
- Fieldrobot Event, a competition in mobile agricultural robotics
- cloud seeding

== See also ==
- E-agriculture
- Machine vision
- Agricultural drones
- Robotic lawn mower
- Service robot
- Vertical farming
- Agricultural machinery
