= Raghuveer Chaudhari =

Indian author (Born: 1938)

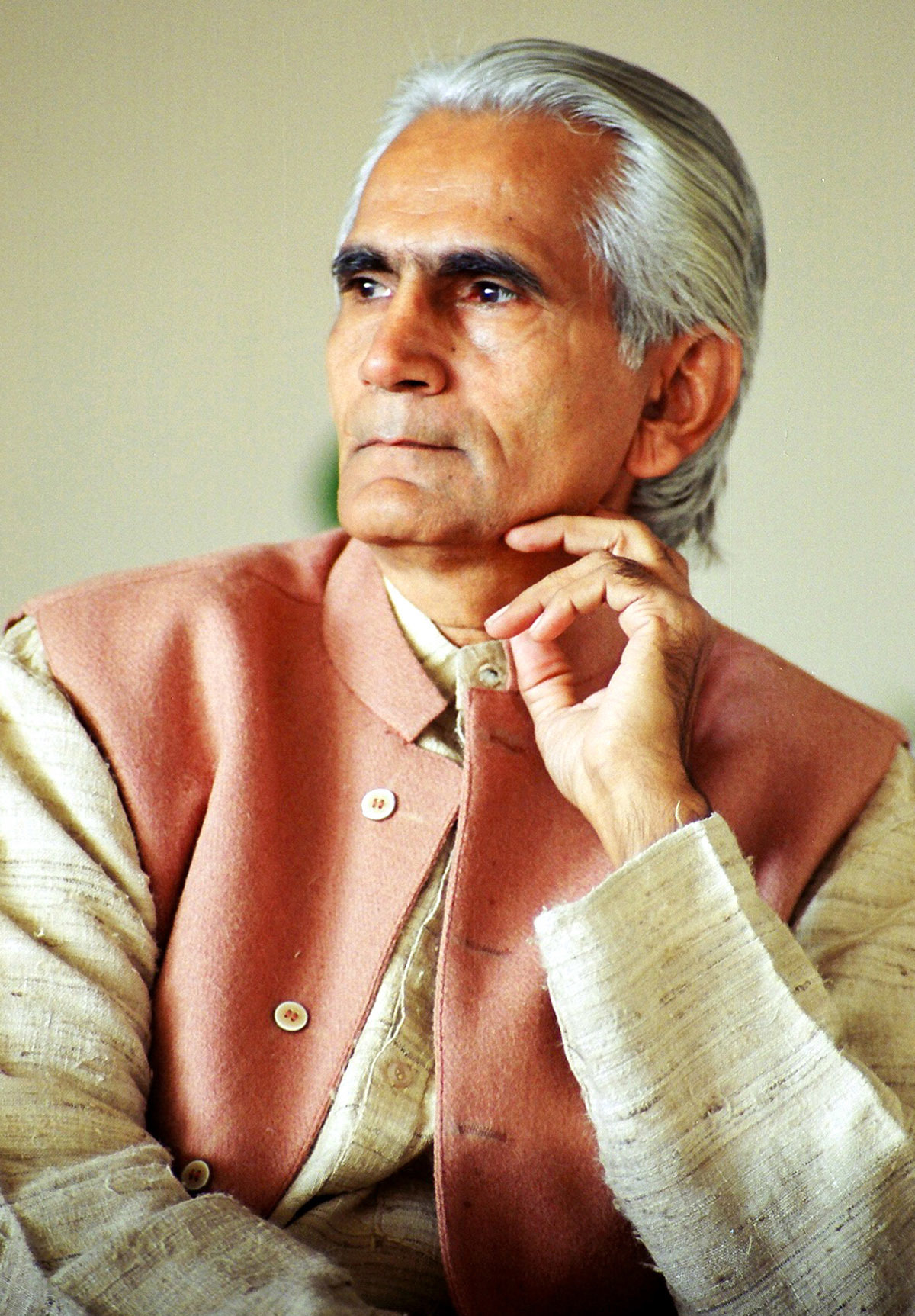
- Chaudhari at Mumbai, 1999
- Born: 5 December 1938 (age 87); Bapupura near Gandhinagar, Gujarat, India
- Occupation: author
- Children: Sanjay Chaudhary, Drashti Patel, Kirti Chaudhary, Surta Mehta
- Writing career
- Language: Gujarati
- Notable work: Amrita (1965)
- Notable awards: Ranjitram Suvarna Chandrak (1975); Sahitya Akademi Award (1977); Jnanpith Award (2015); Padma Shri (2024)

Signature
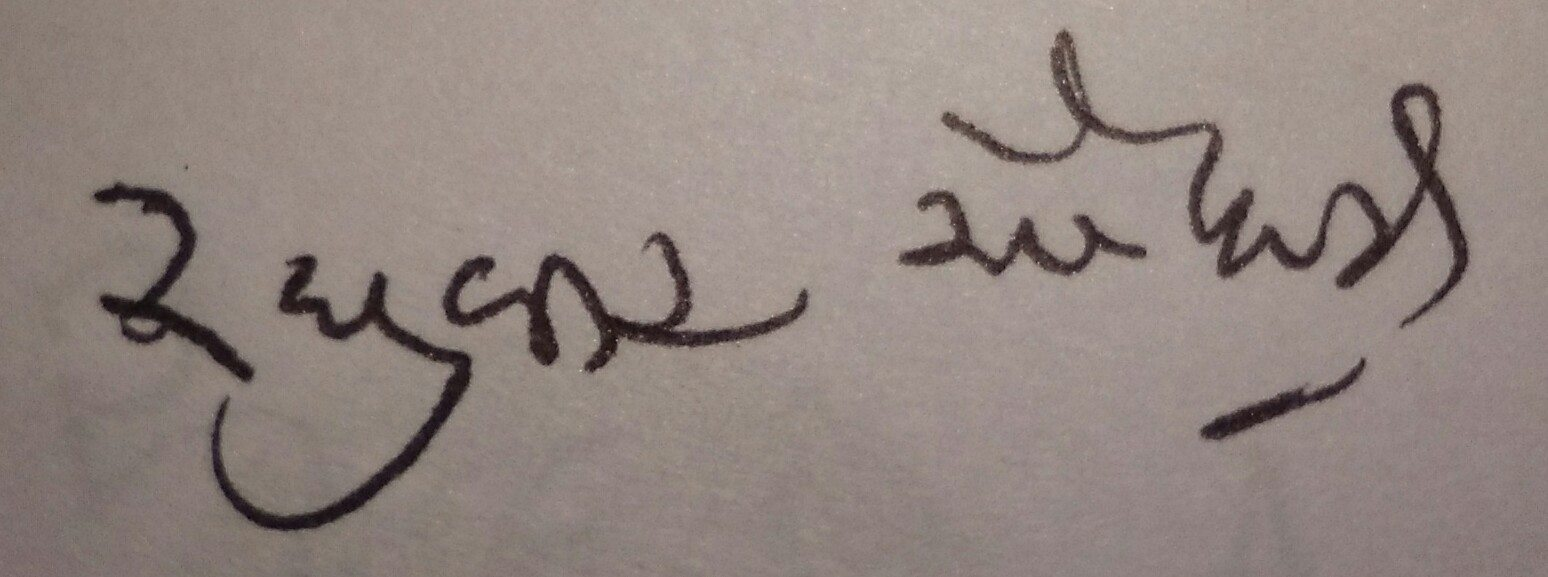

Raghuveer Chaudhari (Note: Spelling of name is based on his signature. Archived here: Other alternative spellings are Raghuvir Chaudhary and Raghuvir Chaudhari.) is a novelist, poet and critic from Gujarat, India. He has also worked as a columnist for numerous newspapers, such as Sandesh, Janmabhumi, Nirikshaka and Divya Bhaskar. He was a teacher at the Gujarat University until his retirement in 1998. His most significant contributions have been in Gujarati language but he has also written Hindi articles. He received the Sahitya Akademi Award in 1977, for his novel trilogy Uparvas. He received Jnanpith Award, considered to be India's highest literary award, in 2015. In 2019, he was awarded a D.Lit. by Gujarat University.

Raghuveer Chaudhari started his career writing novels and poetry, and later ventured into other forms of literature. He authored more than 80 books and received numerous literary awards. He also served many literary organisations.

== Early life ==
Raghuveer Chaudhari was born on 5 December 1938, in Bapupura village near Gandhinagar, Gujarat, to Dalsinh and Jeeviben, a religious farming couple. He is from Anjana Chaudhari family. He completed primary and secondary education in Mansa, Gujarat. He received a B.A. in 1960 and M.A. in Hindi language and literature in 1962 from Gujarat University. In 1979, Chaudhari also received a PhD for his Comparative Study of Hindi and Gujarati Verbal Roots at the same university.

He participated in the Navnirman Movement and opposed the Emergency in the 1970s.

== Career ==
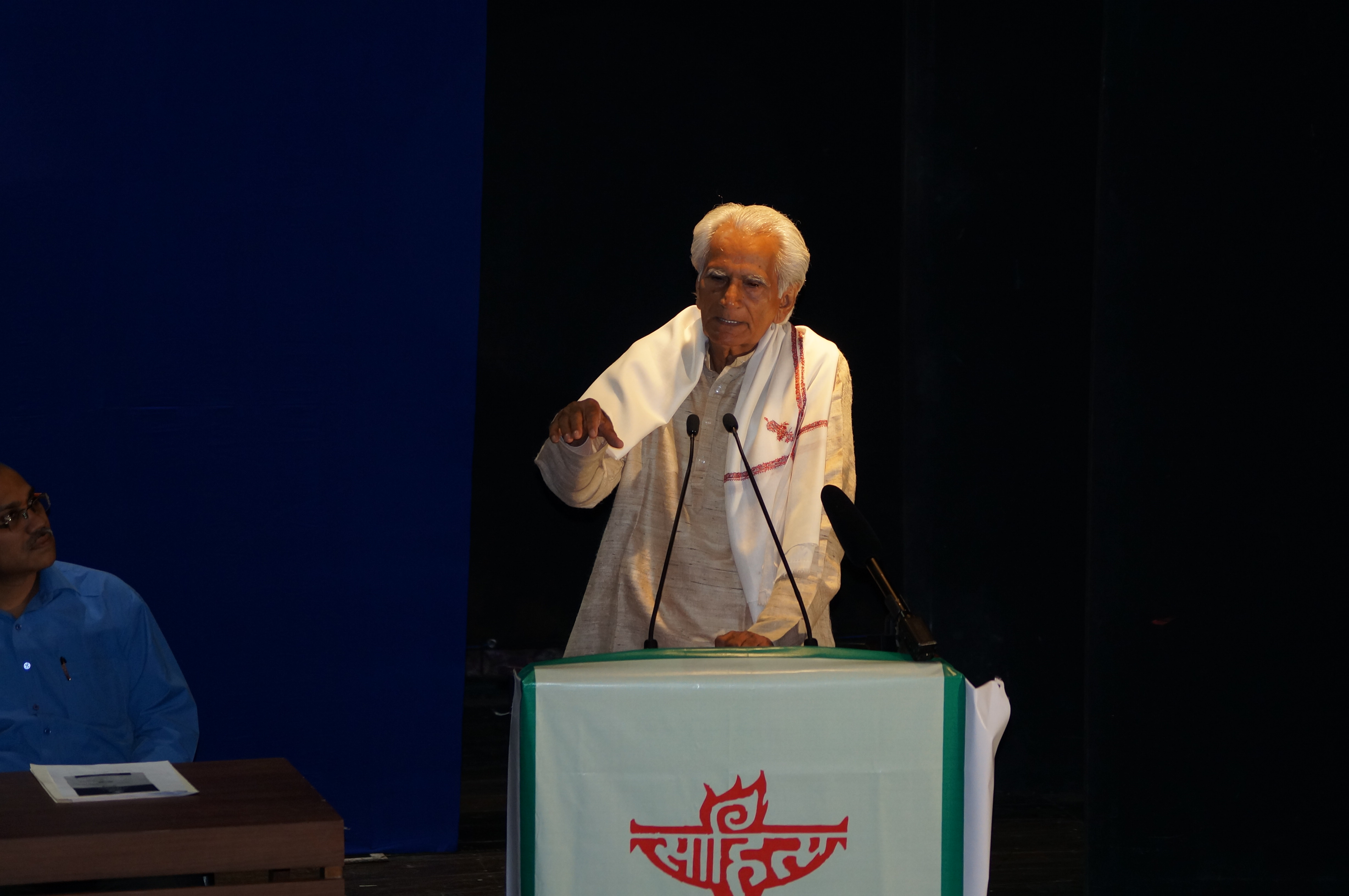
Raghuvir Chaudhari at Sahitya Akademi, New Delhi

Chaudhari joined the School of Languages in Gujarat University from 1977 and retired as a professor and the head of Department of Hindi in 1998. He served for the executive council of Sahitya Akademi from 1998 to 2002. He was a member of the Press Council of India from 2002 to 2004 and was also appointed a jury member of the 25th Indian Film Festival.

After retirement, he returned to Bapupura and started agricultural activities. He was the president of Gujarati Sahitya Parishad in 2001 and is currently serving as its trustee.

== Works ==
He has written more than eighty books including novels, poetry, plays and literary criticism. He chiefly writes in Gujarati but also occasionally in Hindi.

=== Novels ===
His novel Amrita (1965) explores the concept of existentialism. His 1975 trilogy titled Uparvas, Sahwas and Antarvas won him the Sahitya Akademi award in 1977. Rudramahalaya (1978) and Somtirth (1996) are historical novels.

His other novels include Venu Vatsala (1967), Purvarang, Laagni (1976), Samjyaa Vinaa Chhuta Padavun (2003) and Ek Dag Aagal Be Dag Paachhal (2009) and Avaran.

=== Plays ===
His Trijo Purush is based on the life of Chandravadan Mehta, a Gujarati author. Sikandar Sani is a historical play while Dim Light is a street play.

=== Poetry ===
Tamasa (1965) is an anthology which explores the idea of intelligence over feelings. Another poetry collection is Vaheta Vriksha Pavanma published in 1985.

=== Other works ===
Akasmik Sparsh and Gersamaj are collections of short stories. His collections of character sketches are published as Sahaarani Bhavyata and Tilak Kare Raghuvir. Saharani Bhavyata gives sketches of twenty five eminent literary figures like Umashankar Joshi, Jayanti Dalal, Sundaram, Yashavant Shukla, Pravin Joshi, Ravji Patel and many others. He wrote columns in several regional as well as national dailies and journals such as Sandesh, Divya Bhaskar, Janmabhoomi and Nirikshaka.

== Recognition ==
Raghuveer's poetry is particularly remarkable for its profundity of thoughts and the meaningful use of images and symbols. Thought "poetry" remains his first love, the form he has consistently explored, is "novel". His faith in the functional aspect of human life has progressively strengthened. It is voiced through his novels Amrita, Venu Vatsala and Uparvas trilogy. Rudra Mahalaya is a landmark in Gujarati historical novel writing. His essays contains a combination of microscopic observation concerning the art of creative writing and a vivid presentation of thought. His style of writing tinged with his unique sense of humour adds to the readability of his essays.

— Shabdasrishti (Issue 395, August 2016)

He was awarded the Sahitya Akademi award for his novel trilogy Uparvas in 1977. During 1965 to 1970 he won numerous prizes awarded annually by the State of Gujarat. He received the Ranjitram Suvarna Chandrak in 1975, Kumar Chandrak in 1965 and Munshi award in 1997. In 2001, he won Sahitya Gaurav Puraskar, which he shared with the renowned Gujarati author Ramanlal Joshi. He also received Sauhard Samman from Uttar Pradesh Hindi Sansthaan for contribution to Hindi literature in 1990, Narmad Suvarna Chandrak in 2010, and the Uma-Snehrashmi Prize for 1974–75. He received Jnanpith Award in 2015. In 2019, he was awarded a D.Lit. by Gujarat University.

== See also ==
- List of Gujarati-language writers
