= Amrita (Gujarati novel) =

1965 Gujarati novel by Raghuveer Chaudhari

- Cover page of first edition, 1965
- Author: Raghuveer Chaudhari
- Original title: અમૃતા
- Language: Gujarati
- Genre: Existentialist novel
- Publisher: Shri Harihar Pustakalaya, Surat
- Publication date: 1965
- Publication place: India
- OCLC: 30883737
- Dewey Decimal: 891.473
- Text: Amrita online

Amrita (pronounced [əmruta]; Gujarati: અમૃતા), also spelled Amruta, is a 1965 Gujarati novel by Raghuveer Chaudhari. Although criticized for its highly Sanskritised language and lengthy metaphysical discussion, it is regarded as a landmark in the development of the experimental novel in modern Gujarati literature. It has been referred to as a reflective existentialist novel.

The story follows a love triangle between three characters, Amrita, Udayan and Aniket.

== Theme ==
Spanning 18 chapters, the novel is divided into three sections: Prashnartha (The Question Mark), Pratibhav (The Response), and Niruttar (The Unanswered). Each section begins with a quote, respectively from Nietzsche, Maitreyi, and Gandhiji. Amrita has been described as a reflective existentialist novel.

The novel depicts the inner and outer lives of three existentialist characters: two men, Aniket and Udayan; and one woman, Amrita. The love triangle between these protagonists serves as an instrument with which to explore existentialism through narrative description of inner and outer experience as the three struggle to come to grips with the meaning of their lives.

== Characters ==
Principal characters:

- Amrita – an intellectual woman
- Udayan – a short-story writer and journalist
- Aniket – a lecturer in botany

== Plot ==
Amrita is awarded her doctorate, and her two friends Udayan and Aniket congratulate her on her achievement. From their youth onward, Udayan has been an important formative influence, guiding Amrita to reach her intellectual goals. Amrita had declared her love for him, but now Udayan observes that Amrita is growing partial to a lecturer in botany, Aniket. Udayan had played a role in introducing Aniket to Amrita. On that occasion, Udayan seemed to have brushed away Amrita's expression of affection, saying that what he desired from her was not so much her love as her understanding. For Udayan, love is contingent, an accidental matter.

During a trip the three take together to Juhu Beach, Udayan falls from their boat during a tempest and is injured. Amrita finds a note under her pillow from her bhabi (her brother's wife), informing her that the family regards her friendship with the two young men as socially embarrassing. Amrita confesses to Udayan that she feels the pressure to make a choice between the two is a threat to her pursuit of freedom. But at the same time, as she sees Aniket off from the station on a journey, Amrita tells Aniket that she will wait for him. Udayan decides to resign from his post as a lecturer in Gujarati, and to sell his property at Bhiloda. Amrita sojourns in Aniket's home, acting as caretaker in his absence. Aniket stays away, living in a rented house in Palanpur and hoping that, while he is gone, Amrita and Udayan will once more draw closer to each other.

In a final meeting, before Udayan, Amrita declares her preference for Aniket. Udayan leaves for Japan to pursue journalistic work on the effects of radiation on survivors of the bombing of Hiroshima. There he falls ill, suffering from kidney disease. On his return to India, he is looked after by both Amrita and Aniket but repudiates their care, even at one point cutting his veins. Amrita and Aniket donate blood to save him. Before Amrita and Aniket accept an invitation to travel to Japan, they visit the bedridden Udayan at Ahmedabad. There he dictates his final testament, a summing up of his life in which he states that he is not a believer, that love itself is an illusion, but that he feels gratitude to his two friends who, in different ways, have helped him understand himself.

== Reception and criticism ==
Amrita was first published by Shri Harihar Pustakalay, Surat, and has been reprinted several times. It is considered a landmark in the development of the experimental novel in modern Gujarati literature. The novel won the Gujarat state award as the most outstanding work of the year 1965.

Chunilal Madia wrote in Indian Literature: "[Amrita's] sophisticated social theme, with the usual love triangle, is depicted with unusual skill and insight. Its only drawback is the highly Sanskritised language which does not change with the changing moods and situations".

Gujarati language poet and critic Chandrakant Topiwala described the novel as making a lasting impact on the reader despite its "abstract, airy thinking and the long metaphysical discussions", saying that the interplay of reflections and reactions between its characters bring alive a story that is otherwise largely uneventful. Among the literary devices contributing to the success of this endeavour, he highlighted free indirect speech, the characters' analyses of one another, the depiction of a dream, and the story's symbolism, which come together to convey "the responsive conflict of the characters, in a rich existential search for their relationship, identity, freedom and choice".

The book was translated into Hindi by Kiran Mathur, and was published by Bharatiya Jnanpith in 1980.
