= Pankaj Chandra =

Indian educationist, author and academic

Pankaj Chandra is an Indian educationist, author and academic. He was director of the Indian Institute of Management, Bangalore, from 2007 to 2013 and since 2014 has been the vice chancellor and chairman of the board of management of Ahmedabad University in Ahmedabad.

== Early life and education ==
Pankaj Chandra was born in Allahabad, Uttar Pradesh. He completed his schooling at St. Joseph's High School in 1978. He holds a BTech degree from the Institute of Technology, Banaras Hindu University, Varanasi, and a PhD from The Wharton School, University of Pennsylvania, United States.

== Career ==
Chandra started his career as an assistant professor at McGill University, and later served as a faculty at Indian Institute of Management Ahmedabad. Thereafter, he served as the director of Indian Institute of Management Bangalore from 2007 to 2013, and later as professor of production and operations management. In 2014 he became vice chancellor and chairman of the board of management of Ahmedabad University.

He has served on a number of Government of India committees: the Committee on Clusters for Development of the Informal Sector, and before that the Committee on Rejuvenation of Higher Education (Yashpal Committee) that re-examined the Indian Higher Education system and the Committee on the Autonomy of Central Institutions. He was a member of two steering committees constituted by the Planning Commission of India for 12th Plan Development, one on Higher & Technical Education (where he also chaired the Sub-Committee on Student Financial Aid), and the other on Industry, and of the Central Advisory Board of Education subcommittee on Teacher Education. He has been a member of the Telecom Regulatory Authority of India. He is a founding member of the Association for Democratic Reforms.

Chandra has been involved in several startups, has been a consultant to Indian and multi-national firms, and serves on the Boards and Academic Councils of several firms and institutions, including Mindtree, BIRAC, National Institute of Design, Ahmedabad, Indira Gandhi Institute of Development Research, Srishti School of Art, Design & Technology, Bangalore, Film & Television Institute of India, Pune, Indian Institute of Technology Jodhpur, International Institute of Information Technology, Bangalore, Indian Institute of Technology Dharwad, and Banaras Hindu University.

== Books ==
- Technology, Practices, and Competitiveness: The Primary Textile Industry in Canada, China and India (ed.), Himalaya Publishing House, Mumbai, 1998.
- Building Universities that Matter: Where are Indian Institutions Going Wrong? Orient Blackswan, New Delhi, 2017.

A reviewer in The Wire called his Building Universities That Matter "an impressively detailed look at the ordeal that higher education is for the country [that] takes into account many dimensions". The Indian Express reviewer, however, wrote: "It must, however, be said that Prof Chandra paints with a broad brush. His macro-generalisations about the social pathologies of major university systems, which also reinforces their bleak future, do not match with the history and diversities of Indian educational institutions."

== Awards and honours ==
- Alumni Award, All India IITBHU Alumni Association, New Delhi, 2009.
- Distinguished Alumni Award, Institute of Technology, Banaras Hindu University, 2009, 2012
- National Education Leadership Award, ET NOW, Mumbai, 2013
- IITBHU Alumnus of the Century in Making Award on the occasion of 100 years of Engineering Education at Banaras Hindu University, Varanasi, 2019
