= Pankaj Joshi (physicist) =

Indian physicist and cosmologist

Pankaj S. Joshi
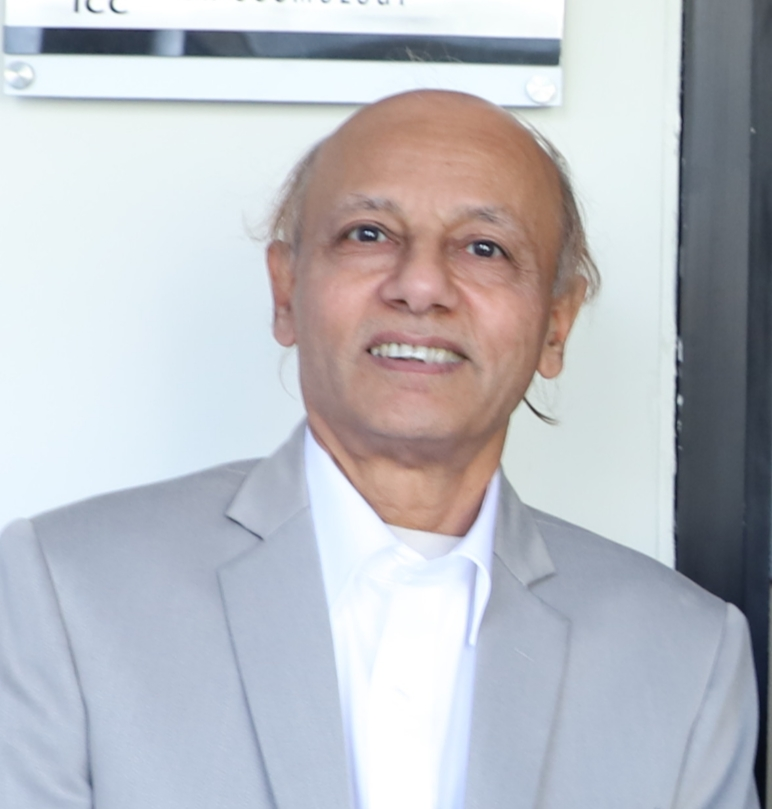
- Born: 25 April 1953 (age 73); Bhavnagar, Gujarat, India
- Education: Maharaja Krishnakumarsinhji Bhavnagar University; Saurashtra University
- Known for: Gravitational collapse Naked singularity
- Spouse: Divya Pankaj Joshi
- Children: Nupur Joshi
- Awards: Fellow of The World Academy of Sciences; Vainu Bappu award
- Scientific career
- Fields: general relativity, cosmology, quantum gravity
- Workplaces: Tata Institute of Fundamental Research; Charotar University of Science and Technology; Ahmedabad University
- Doctoral advisor: Prahalad Chunnilal Vaidya, Prof. J. Krishna Rao

Pankaj S. Joshi (born 25 April 1953) is an Indian astrophysicist and cosmologist whose research is mainly focused on areas of gravitational collapse and spacetime singularity. He has published more than 225 research papers in national and international journals, and books and monographs on the subject. Currently, he is a Distinguished Professor of Physics, and founding director of the International Center for Space and Cosmology at Ahmedabad University.

== Early life and career ==
Joshi was born in Bhavnagar, Gujarat on 25 April 1953.

He earned his B.Sc. degree from Sir P.P. Institute of Science, Maharaja Krishnakumarinhji Bhavnagar University. He then pursued M.Sc. from department of mathematics, Saurashtra University. Continuing at Bhavnagar University Joshi obtained his Ph.D. degree in 1979, and his thesis was on 'A study of causality in general relativity'.

After his doctoral work, he joined Tata Institute of Fundamental Research in Mumbai in 1979 as a Visiting Fellow, to work with Jayant V. Narlikar in the astrophysics group there. In 1981 he joined the general relativity group of Ezra T. Newman at the University of Pittsburgh, USA. Subsequently after working at the University of Cambridge, UK, visiting Stephen Hawking's group for a few months in 1983, he joined TIFR, Mumbai as a faculty with their Astrophysics Group. He held several positions at TIFR, Mumbai from 1983 to 2018. He was Senior Professor at the department of astronomy and astrophysics, TIFR before joining the Charotar University of Science and Technology as Vice Chancellor (Provost), and Founding Director of the International Centre for Cosmology.

Joshi has served as President of Indian Association of General Relativity and Gravitation from 2010 to 2012 and President of Gujarat Science Academy (2020-2023).

=== Research ===
The 2021 Nobel Prize in Physics was given to Roger Penrose (Oxford), for his discovery in 1965 that massive collapsing stars in the universe end up in space-time singularities at the end of their lives. The result was derived using Einstein's theory of general relativity. These singularities are unique fireballs, where densities, temperatures and all physical quantities are arbitrarily and extremely high. These are such unique entities in cosmos, which are seen no other places, and as yet unknown laws of quantum gravity would operate there. Penrose always assumed that such singularities must happen hidden within interiors of black holes only. That is, they are never seen by faraway observers. Such an assumption is called the cosmic censorship hypothesis. However, this assumption was never proven. Work by Joshi with his team and students has shown that singularities or fireballs can occur outside black holes. These are also called naked or visible singularities. Joshi wrote his first paper on the subject in 1986, and then published a series of papers on these fireballs, naked singularities, and black holes. This culminated in his 1993 Oxford monograph, `Global Aspects in Gravitation and Cosmology', published by the Oxford University Press, included in their pre-world war I series, The International series of Monographs in Physics.

== Awards and honours ==
- Elected fellow of The World Academy of Sciences(TWAS), 2021
- INSA Vainu Bappu award, 2020
- Elected fellow of Indian National Science Academy (INSA), 2013
- Elected fellow of National Academy of Sciences India (NASI), 2006
- Gravity Research Foundation (USA) award for research on the Final Fate of Gravitational Collapse, 1991
- Prof. A. C. Banerji Gold Medal and Memorial Lecture award by the National Academy of Sciences (NASI)
- C V Raman lecture award by the Department of Atomic Energy

== Monographs, books, and conference proceedings ==
1. Joshi P. S. (2018, 2015), The Story of Collapsing Stars–Black Holes, Naked Singularities and the Cosmic Play of Quantum Gravity, Oxford University Press, Oxford, UK, 2015; paperback edition Feb 2018.
2. Joshi P. S., (2012, 2008), Gravitational Collapse and Spacetime Singularities, Paperback Edition; Cambridge University Press, included in their monograph series, Cambridge Monographs on Mathematical Physics.
3. Joshi P. S. (2011), (ed. with R. Tikekar, N. Dadhich, K. Jotania, A. M. Vaidya, M. H. Vasavada), A Tribute to P C Vaidya, Special issue of Mathematics Today, Vol 26 (2011).
4. Joshi P. S. (2007), (ed. with N. Dadhich and P. Roy), Raychaudhuri Equation at the Cross-roads, a Special Volume in honour of A. K. Raychaudhuri, Pramana -Journal of Physics, Vol. 69, No. 1, Indian Academy of Sciences and Springer, Bangalore.
5. Joshi P. S., (1996, 1993), Global Aspects in Gravitation and Cosmology, Clarendon Press (OUP), Oxford; the paperback edition, with corrections (The International Series of Monographs on Physics, Vol 87).
6. Joshi P. S. (ed.), (1996), Singularities, Black Holes and Cosmic Censorship, Proceedings of the Raychaudhuri Session at the International Conference on Gravitation and Cosmology (ICGC95), IUCAA Publication, Pune, 1996.

== Books in Gujarati ==
- Prayogatmak Gandhi, 2021
- Vishvana Maharahasyo (વિશ્વનાં મહારહસ્યો), 2020
- Prayogoni Maja (Vignangoshti), 2013
- Brahmand-Goshthi, 2012
- Vigyan Goshti Jeevanshrushti Ane Bhramand, 2011
- Brahmand Darshan (2011)
- તારા સૃષ્ટિ, 2006 (3rd Edition, 2010)
- ખગોળ ના મહાપ્રશ્નો, 2004
- સાપેક્ષવાદ, 2002
- તારા સર્જન અને વિલય, 2000
- કુતૂહુલ (Gujarati translation), part I and II, it teenagers series; 1982, 1984
- Prayogoni Maja (Vignangoshti), 1985
- અવનવા પ્રયોગો, 1986
- Popular articles on science and cosmology (during the period 1981-2022)
