= Information and communications technology in agriculture =

Agricultural and rural development

Information and communication technology in agriculture (ICT in agriculture), also known as e-agriculture, is a subset of agricultural technology focused on improved information and communication processes. More specifically, e-agriculture involves the conceptualization, design, development, evaluation and application of innovative ways to use information and communication technologies (ICTs) in the rural domain, with a primary focus on agriculture. ICT includes devices, networks, mobiles, services and applications; these range from innovative Internet-era technologies and sensors to other pre-existing aids such as fixed telephones, televisions, radios and satellites. Provisions of standards, norms, methodologies, and tools as well as development of individual and institutional capacities, and policy support are all key components of e-agriculture.

Many ICT in agriculture or e-agriculture interventions have been developed and tested around the world to help agriculturists improve their livelihoods through increased agricultural productivity and income, or by reducing risks. Some useful resources for learning about e-agriculture in practice are the World Bank's e-sourcebook ICT in agriculture – connecting smallholder farmers to knowledge, networks and institutions (2011), ICT uses for inclusive value chains (2013), ICT uses for inclusive value chains (2013) and Success stories on information and communication technologies for agriculture and rural development have documented many cases of use of ICT in agriculture. Information technology could help improve food security, protect natural resources, and promote a good living standard for smallerholder farmers in Sub-Saharan Africa.

== Wireless technologies ==
Wireless technologies have numerous applications in agriculture. One major usage is the simplification of closed-circuit television camera systems; the use of wireless communications eliminates the need for the installation of coaxial cables.

== Global Positioning System (GPS) ==
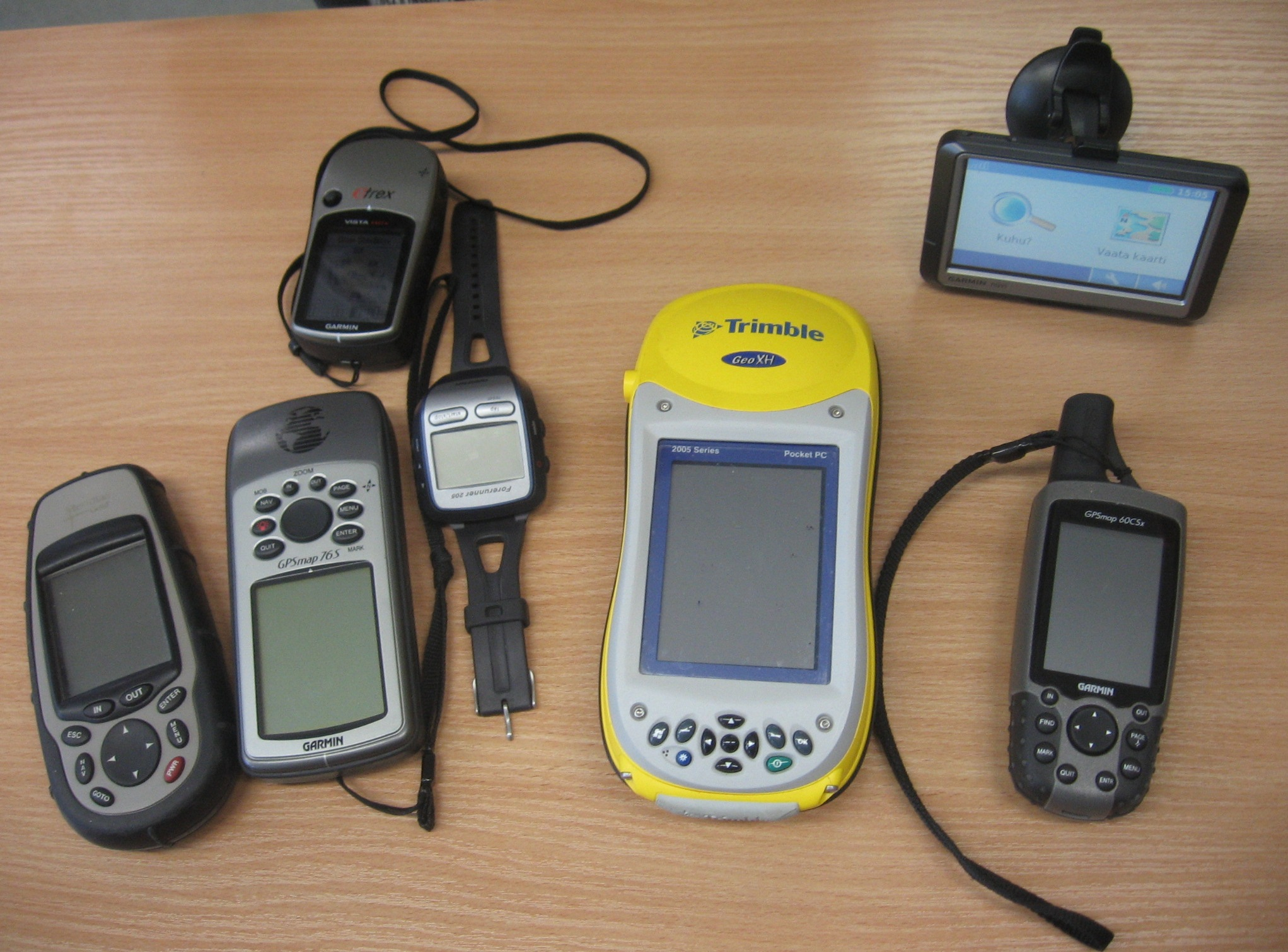
GPS receivers

In agriculture, the use of the Global Positioning System provides benefits in geo-fencing, map-making and surveying. GPS receivers dropped in price over the years, making it more popular for civilian use. With the use of GPS, civilians can produce simple yet highly accurate digitized map without the help of a professional cartographer.

In Kenya, for example, the solution to prevent an elephant bull from wandering into farms and destroying crops was to tag the elephant with a device that sends a text message when it crosses a geo-fence. Using the technology of SMS and GPS, the elephant can roam freely and the authorities are alerted whenever it is near the farm.

== Geographic information systems ==
Geographic information systems, or GiS, are extensively used in agriculture, especially in precision farming. Land is mapped digitally, and pertinent geodetic data such as topography and contours are combined with other statistical data for easier analysis of the soil. GIS is used in decision making such as what to plant and where to plant using historical data and sampling.

== Computer-controlled devices (automated systems) ==
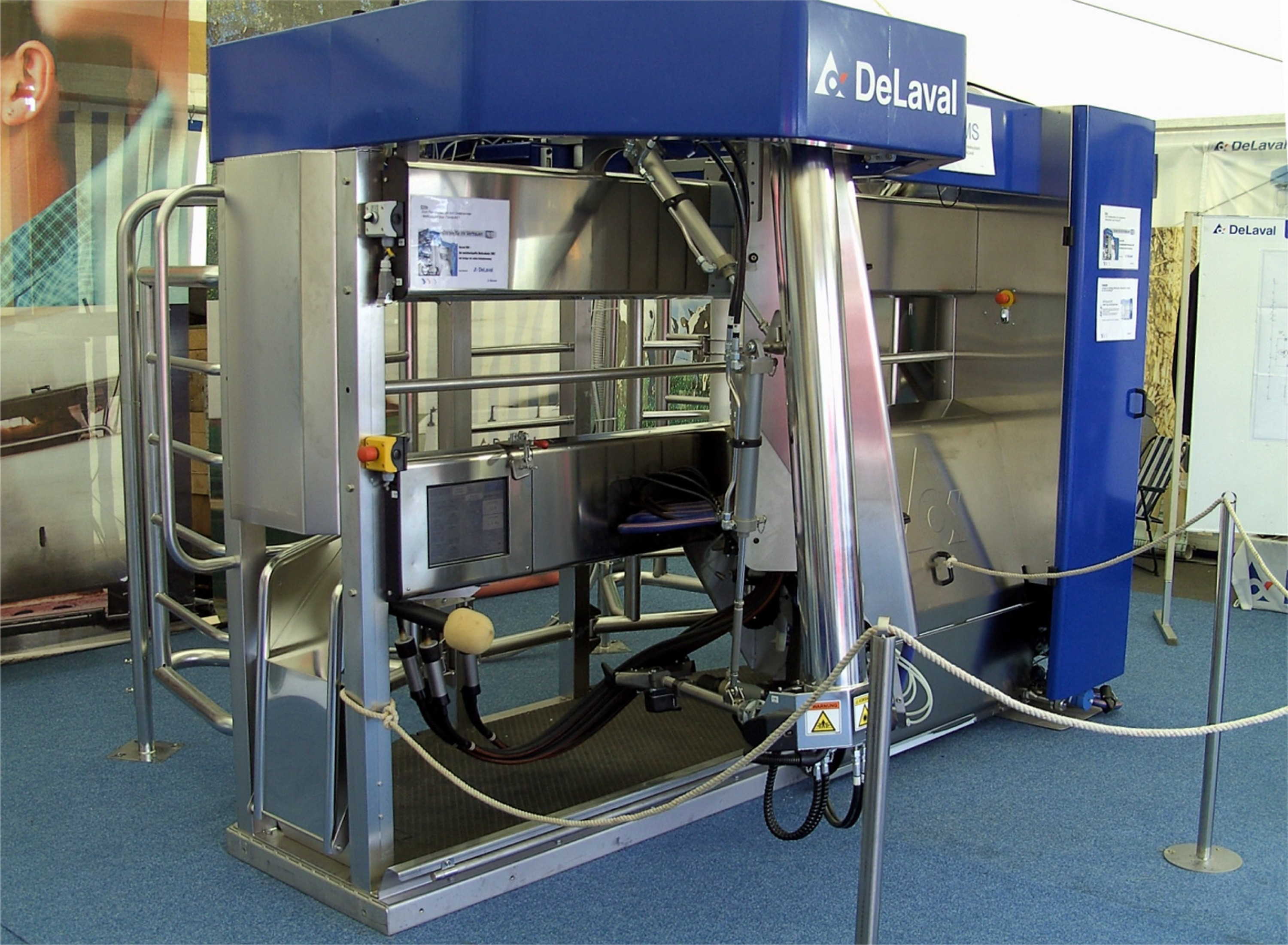
DeLaval milking station

Automatic milking systems are computer controlled stand alone systems that milk the dairy cattle without human labor. The complete automation of the milking process is controlled by an agricultural robot, a complex herd management software, and specialized computers. Automatic milking eliminates the farmer from the actual milking process, allowing for more time for supervision of the farm and the herd. Farmers can also improve herd management by using the data gathered by the computer. By analyzing the effect of various animal feeds on milk yield, farmers may adjust accordingly to obtain optimal milk yields. Since the data is available down to individual level, each cow may be tracked and examined, and the farmer may be alerted when there are unusual changes that could mean sickness or injuries.

== Smartphone mobile apps in agriculture ==
The use of mobile technologies as a tool of intervention in agriculture is becoming increasingly popular. Smartphone penetration enhances the multi-dimensional positive impact on sustainable poverty reduction and identify accessibility as the main challenge in harnessing the full potential (Silarszky et al., 2008) in agricultural space. The reach of smartphone even in rural areas extended the ICT services beyond simple voice or text messages. Several smartphone apps are available for agriculture, horticulture, animal husbandry and farm machinery.

== RFID for animal identification ==
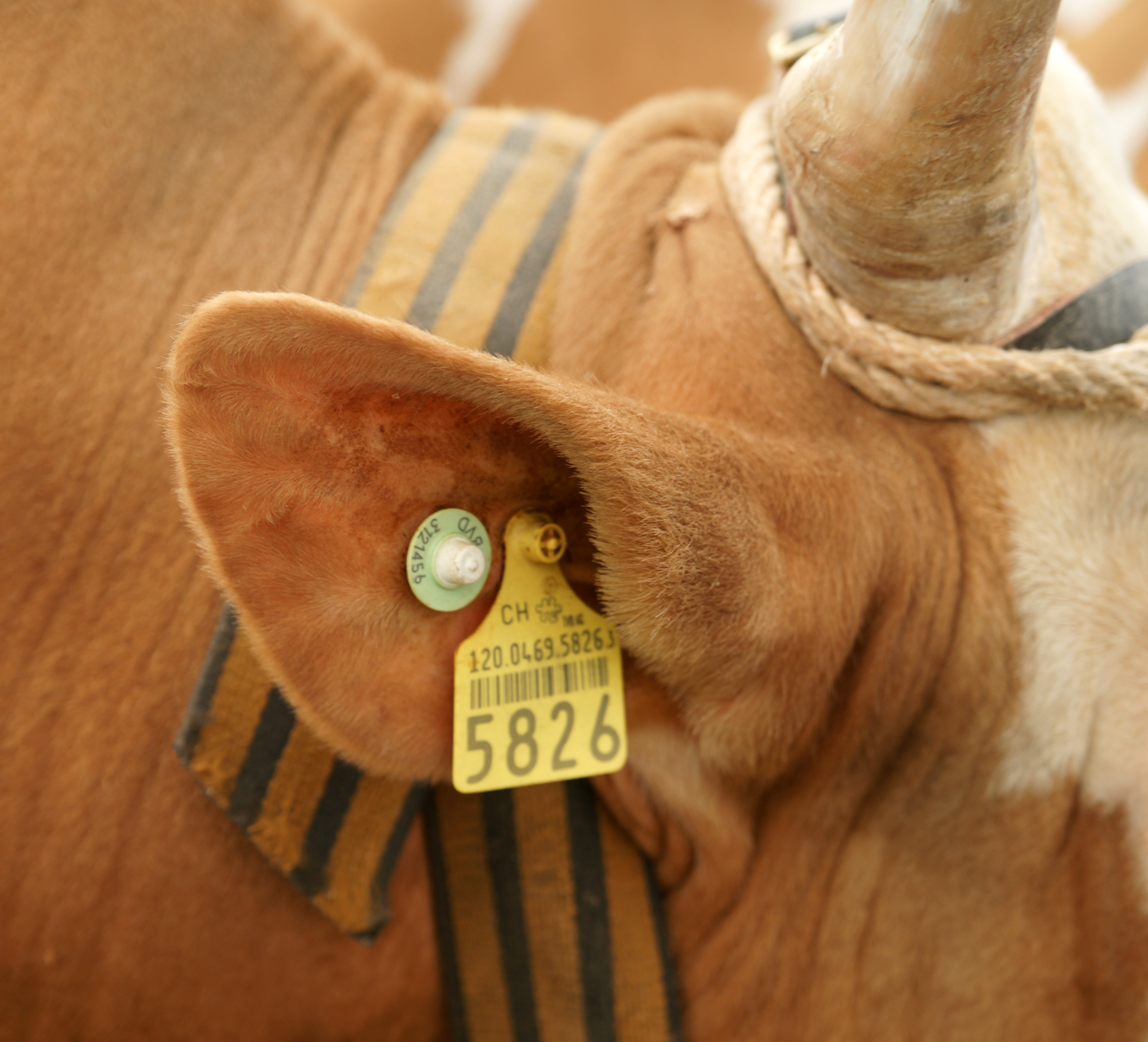
Swiss cow ear with eartag and RFID

RFID tags for animals represent one of the oldest uses of RFID. Originally meant for large ranches and rough terrain, since the outbreak of mad-cow disease, RFID has become crucial in animal identification management. An implantable RFID tag or transponder can also be used for animal identification. The transponders are better known as PIT (Passive Integrated Transponder) tags, passive RFID, or "chips" on animals. The Canadian Cattle Identification Agency began using RFID tags as a replacement for barcode tags. Currently CCIA tags are used in Wisconsin and by United States farmers on a voluntary basis. The USDA is currently developing its own program.

RFID tags are required for all cattle sold in Australia and in some states, sheep and goats as well.

The Veterinary Department of Malaysia's Ministry of Agriculture introduced a livestock-tracking program in 2009 to track the estimated 80,000 cattle all across the country. Each cattle is tagged with the use of RFID technology for easier identification, providing access to relevant data such as: bearer's location, name of breeder, origin of livestock, sex, and dates of movement. This program is the first of its kind in Asia, and is expected to increase the competitiveness of Malaysian livestock industry in international markets by satisfying the regulatory requirements of importing countries like United States, Europe and Middle East. Tracking by RFID will also help producers meet the dietary standards by the halal market. The program will also provide improvements in controlling disease outbreaks in livestock.

RFID tags have also been proposed as a means of monitoring animal health. One study involved using RFID to track drinking behavior in pigs as an indicator of overall health.

== E-commerce ==
Online purchasing order of agri-inputs and agri-equipments is a subset of E-commerce.

== Sensing technologies ==
Various image sensor technologies provide the data, in the most common case from a visible light digital camera. Fluorescence imaging is also used in plant health monitoring – demonstrated by Ning et al. 1995 in very early diagnosis of herbicide injury and attack by fungal plant pathogens.

== FAO E-agriculture Strategy Guide ==
The FAO-ITU E-agriculture Strategy Guide provides a framework to holistically address the ICT opportunities and challenges for the agricultural sector in a more efficient manner while generating new revenue streams and improve the livelihoods of the rural community as well as ensure the goals of the national agriculture master plan are achieved. The e-agriculture strategy, and its alignment with other government plans, was intended to prevent e-agriculture projects and services from being implemented in isolation. It was developed by the Food and Agriculture Organization (FAO) and the International Telecommunication Union (ITU) with support from partners including the Technical Centre for Agricultural and Rural Cooperation (CTA) as a framework for countries in developing their national e-agriculture strategy/masterplan.

Some of the countries who are using the FAO-ITU E-agriculture Strategy Guide to develop their national e-agriculture strategy are Bhutan, Sri Lanka, Papua New Guinea, Philippines, Pakistan, Fiji, Cambodia, Indonesia, Turkey, Tajikistan and Armenia. The guide provides a framework to engage a broader stakeholders in the development of national e-agriculture strategy.

The E-agriculture in Action series of publications, by FAO-ITU, that provides guidance on emerging technologies and how it could be used to address some of the challenges in agriculture through documenting case studies.

- E-agriculture in Action: Big Data for Agriculture
- E-agriculture in Action: Blockchain for Agriculture
- E-agriculture in Action: Drones for Agriculture
- E-agriculture in Action

== Recognition and application ==
E-agriculture is one of the action lines identified in the declaration and plan of action of the World Summit on the Information Society (WSIS). The "Tunis Agenda for the Information Society," published on 18 November 2005 and emphasizes the leading facilitating roles that UN agencies need to play in the implementation of the Geneva Plan of Action. The Food and Agriculture Organization of the United Nations (FAO) has been assigned the responsibility of organizing activities related to the action line under C.7 ICT Applications on E-Agriculture.

Many ICT interventions have been developed and tested around the world, with varied degrees of success, to help agriculturists improve their livelihoods through increased agricultural productivity and incomes, and reduction in risks. Some useful resources for learning about e-agriculture in practice are the World Bank's e-sourcebook ICT in agriculture – connecting smallholder farmers to knowledge, networks and institutions (2011), ICT uses for inclusive value chains (2013), ICT uses for inclusive value chains (2013) and Success stories on information and communication technologies for agriculture and rural development have documented many cases of use of ICT in agriculture.

The FAO-ITU E-agriculture Strategy Guide was developed by the Food and Agriculture Organization and the International Telecommunication Union (ITU) with support from partners including the Technical Centre for Agricultural and Rural Cooperation (CTA) as a framework for countries in developing their national e-agriculture strategy/masterplan.

Some of the countries who are using the FAO-ITU E-agriculture Strategy Guide to develop their national e-agriculture strategy are Bhutan, Sri Lanka, Papua New Guinea, Philippines, Fiji and Vanuatu. The guide provides a framework to engage broader stakeholders in the development of national e-agriculture strategy.

== History ==
In 2008, the United Nations referred to e-agriculture as "an emerging field", with the expectation that its scope would change and evolve as our understanding of the area grows.

=== ICT in support of rural poverty elimination and food security ===
In August 2003, the Overseas Development Institute (ODI), the UK Department for International Development (DFID) and the United Nations Food and Agricultural Organization (FAO) joined in a collaborative research project to look at bringing together livelihoods thinking with concepts from information and communication for development, in order to improve understanding of the role and importance of information and communication in support of rural livelihoods.

The policy recommendations included:

- Building on existing systems, while encouraging integration of different technologies and information sharing
- Determining who should pay, through consensus and based on a thorough analysis of the costs
- Ensuring equitable access to marginalised groups and those in the agricultural sector
- Promoting localised content, with decentralised and locally owned processes
- Building capacity, through provision of training packages and maintaining a choice of information sources
- Using realistic technologies, that are suitable within the existing infrastructure
- Building knowledge partnerships to ensure that knowledge gaps are filled and a two-way flow of information allows knowledge to originate from all levels of the network and community.

The importance of ICT is also recognized in the 8th Millennium Development Goal, with the target to "...make available the benefits of new technologies, especially information and communications technologies (ICTs)" to the fight against poverty.

=== WSIS process ===
E-agriculture is one of the action lines identified in the declaration and plan of action (2003) of the World Summit on the Information Society (WSIS). The "Tunis Agenda for the Information Society", published on 18 November 2005, emphasizes the leading facilitating roles that UN agencies need to play in the implementation of the Geneva Plan of Action.

FAO hosted the first e-agriculture workshop in June 2006, bringing together representatives of leading development organizations involved in agriculture. The meeting served to initiate development of an effective process to engage as wide a range of stakeholders involved in e-agriculture, and resulted in the formation of the e-Agriculture Community, a community of practice. The e-Agriculture Community's Founding Partners include: Consultative Group on International Agricultural Research (CGIAR); Technical Centre for Agriculture and Rural Development (CTA); FAO; Global Alliance for Information and Communication Technologies and Development (GAID); Global Forum on Agricultural Research (GFAR); Global Knowledge Partnership (GKP); Gesellschaft fur Technische Zusammenarbeit (now called Deutsche Gesellschaft für Internationale Zusammenarbeit, GIZ); International Association of Agricultural Information Specialists (IAALD); Inter-American Institute for Cooperation on Agriculture (IICA); International Fund for Agricultural Development (IFAD); International Centre for Communication for Development (IICD); United States National Agricultural Library (NAL); United Nations Department of Economic and Social Affairs (UNDESA); the World Bank.

== See also ==
- Agricultural cooperative
- Agricultural drones
- Agricultural resources
- Community-supported agriculture
- Computer-aided design (CAD)
- Computer-aided manufacturing (CAM)
- Digital agriculture
- E-learning
- Environmental monitoring
