= Ashitava Ghosal =

Indian mechanical engineer

Ashitava Ghosal is a professor in the department of mechanical engineering at Indian Institute of Science. He works in the area of Robotics and Control Systems. He has completed his M.S. under the supervision of great kinematician G.N.Sandor. He has authored a book on Robotics. He serves as the Associate Editor for the ASME Journal of Mechanisms and Robotics.
