= Balaji Prakash =

Indian biologist (born 1968)

- Born: 1968 (age 57–58); India
- Education: Indian Institute of Science; Max Planck Institute of Molecular Physiology
- Known for: Studies on GTP-binding protein
- Awards: 2009 N-BIOS Prize
- Scientific career
- Fields: Structural biology; Biochemistry
- Workplaces: Jawaharlal Nehru University; IIT Kanpur; Central Food Technological Research Institute

Balaji Prakash (born 1968) is an Indian structural biologist, biochemist and professor, biological and life sciences, at the School of Arts and Sciences, Ahmedabad University since July 2020. Prior to this he served as senior principal scientist and the head of the department of molecular nutrition of the Central Food Technological Research Institute. Known for elucidating the structure of a unique GTP-binding protein, Prakash is an elected Fellow of the National Academy of Sciences, India (2013) and was a senior research fellow of The Wellcome Trust, UK (2004). The Department of Biotechnology of the Government of India awarded him the National Bioscience Award for Career Development, one of the highest Indian science awards, for his contributions to biosciences, in 2009.

== Biography ==
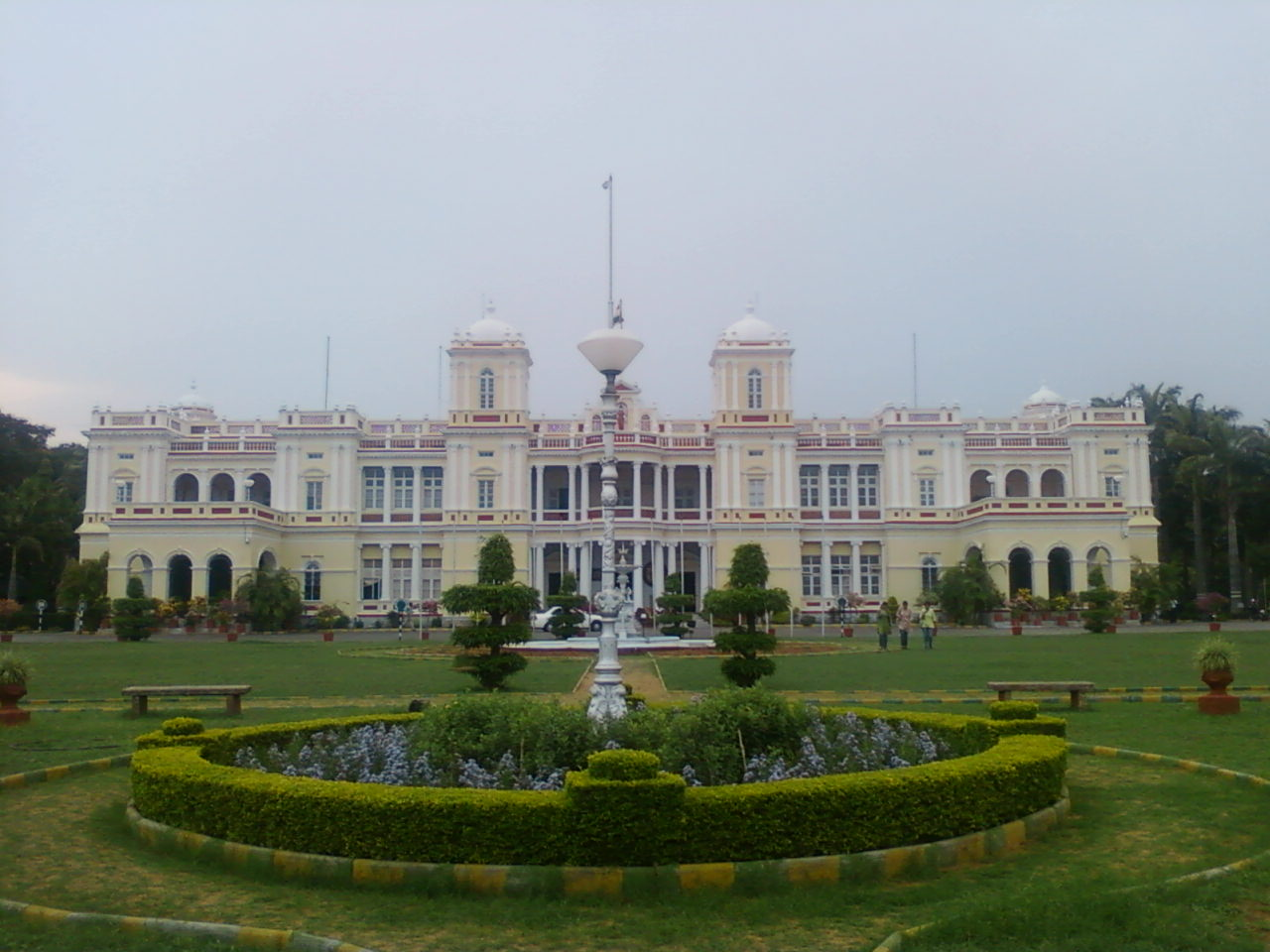
CFTRI

Balaji Prakash, born in 1968, did his doctoral studies at the Indian Institute of Science and after securing a PhD in 1996, he completed his post-doctoral work at Max Planck Institute of Molecular Physiology in 2002. Returning to India, he joined Jawaharlal Nehru University the same year as an assistant professor at the Special Center for Molecular Medicine but his stay there lasted only 7 months. In November 2002, he joined the Indian Institute of Technology, Kanpur at their Department of Biological Sciences and Bio-Engineering where he later served as an associate professor from 2005 to 2010 and as a professor from 2010 to 2014. He subsequently led the Department of Molecular Nutrition of the Central Food Technological Research Institute as a senior principal scientist. In July 2020, he joined Ahmedabad University – a liberal education institution focused on interdisciplinary learning and research thinking – as Associate Dean, Sciences, at the School of Arts and Sciences, where nurtured the growth of two divisions – Mathematical and Physical Sciences, Biological and Life Sciences. Here, he ideated a few clusters of excellence around which all aspects critical to the growth of the school were centered, i.e. faculty recruitment, new PhD and Undergraduate programs, funding – were all focused around these clusters to increase focus, visibility and impact.

== Career ==
Prakash's research focus is on enzyme catalysis, with special interest in the enzyme family composed of GTPases, kinases and sugar nucleotidyltransferases, as well as the development of peptides for food industry. During his post-doctoral work at the Max Planck Institute of Molecular Physiology, he elucidated the structure of a GTP-binding protein. At CFTRI, he has worked on molecular nutrition and the development of nutraceuticals and has developed a technology titled Microbes based printing for fabrication of electronic circuits for which he holds the patent; another of his invention, A novel device for crystallizing proteins and protein complexes or other biological macromolecules, is being prepared for patent submission. His studies have been documented by way of a number of articles (Note: Please see Selected bibliography section) and ResearchGate, an online repository of scientific articles has listed 55 of them. Besides, he has delivered invited speeches at numerous conferences and seminars including the 2nd Indo-American Frontiers of Science Symposium held at Irvine, California in 2006. One of his students was Dr. Saravanan Murugeson, who studied at IIT Kanpur from 2009 to 2016. He is currently a teacher at Vedantu, where he teaches and prepares aspiring Indian Institutes of Technology students for the IIT-JEE, or Joint Entrance Examination.

== Awards and honors ==
The Department of Biotechnology (DBT) of the Government of India awarded him the National Bioscience Award for Career Development, one of the highest Indian science awards in 2009. In 2011, he was elected as a member of the Guha Research Conference and the National Academy of Sciences, Indiaelected him as a fellow in 2013. He was awarded the prestigious senior research fellowship of the Wellcome Trust, U.K. in 2004.

== Selected bibliography ==
- Suresh, Ammu; Prakash, Balaji; Kulkarni, Kiran (March 2023). "Characterizing a novel CMK-EngA fusion protein from Bifidobacterium: Implications for inter-domain regulation". Biochemistry and Biophysics Reports. 33 101410. doi:10.1016/j.bbrep.2022.101410. PMC 9791819. PMID 36578527.
- Vishweshwaraiah, Yashavantha L.; Acharya, Abhishek; Hegde, Vinayak; Prakash, Balaji (September 2021). "Rational design of hyperstable antibacterial peptides for food preservation". npj Science of Food. 5 (1) 26. doi:10.1038/s41538-021-00109-z. PMC 8410836. PMID 34471114.
- Patil, Pratik Rajendra; Vithani, Neha; Singh, Virender; Kumar, Ashok; Prakash, Balaji (September 2020). "A revised mechanism for (p)ppGpp synthesis by Rel proteins: The critical role of the 2′-OH of GTP". Journal of Biological Chemistry. 295 (37): 12851–12867. doi:10.1074/jbc.RA120.013636. PMC 7489905. PMID 32719004.
- Vithani, Neha; Prakash, Balaji; Nair, Nisanth N. (August 2020). "Mechanism of Nucleotidyltransfer Reaction and Role of Mg2+ Ion in Sugar Nucleotidyltransferases". Biophysical Journal. 119 (3): 619–627. Bibcode:2020BpJ...119..619V. doi:10.1016/j.bpj.2020.06.017. PMC 7399479. PMID 32645293.
- Bais, Vaibhav Singh; Aggarwal, Pooja; Bharadwaj, Prashant; Prakash, Balaji (May 2020). "Classification, characterization and structural analysis of sugar nucleotidylyltransferase family of enzymes". Biochemical and Biophysical Research Communications. 525 (3): 780–785. Bibcode:2020BBRC..525..780B. doi:10.1016/j.bbrc.2020.02.148. PMID 32147095.
- Bais, Vaibhav Singh; Batra, Sahil; Prakash, Balaji (August 2018). "Identification of two highly promiscuous thermostable sugar nucleotidylyltransferases for glycorandomization". The FEBS Journal. 285 (15): 2840–2855. doi:10.1111/febs.14521. PMID 29806742.
- L. Vishweshwaraiah, Yashavanth; Acharya, Abhishek; Prakash, Balaji (September 2018). "Structural basis of noncanonical polyphenol oxidase activity in DLL-II: A lectin from Dolichos lablab". Biotechnology and Applied Biochemistry. 65 (5): 701–717. doi:10.1002/bab.1653. PMID 29572945.
- Vithani, Neha; Ankush Jagtap, Pravin Kumar; Verma, Sunil Kumar; Tripathi, Ravi; Awasthi, Shalini; Nair, Nisanth N.; Prakash, Balaji (March 2018). "Mechanism of Mg2+-Accompanied Product Release in Sugar Nucleotidyltransferases". Structure. 26 (3): 459–466.e3. doi:10.1016/j.str.2018.02.002. PMID 29514078.
- Vishweshwaraiah, Yashavanth L.; Prakash, Balaji; Gowda, Lalitha R. (March 2018). "Expression profiling of the Dolichos lablab lectin during germination and development of the seed". Plant Physiology and Biochemistry. 124: 10–19. Bibcode:2018PlPB..124...10V. doi:10.1016/j.plaphy.2017.12.040. PMID 29324242.
- Majumdar, Soneya; Acharya, Abhishek; Prakash, Balaji (December 2017). "Structural plasticity mediates distinct GAP -dependent GTP hydrolysis mechanisms in Rab33 and Rab5". The FEBS Journal. 284 (24): 4358–4375. doi:10.1111/febs.14314. PMID 29095572.
- Bais, Vaibhav Singh; Mohapatra, Balaram; Ahamad, Nadim; Boggaram, Sanjana; Verma, Sandeep; Prakash, Balaji (January 2018). "Investigating the inhibitory potential of 2-Aminopurine metal complexes against serine/threonine protein kinases from Mycobacterium tuberculosis". Tuberculosis. 108: 47–55. doi:10.1016/j.tube.2017.10.005. PMID 29523327.
- Vithani, Neha; Batra, Sahil; Prakash, Balaji; Nair, Nisanth N. (6 January 2017). "Elucidating the GTP Hydrolysis Mechanism in FeoB: A Hydrophobic Amino-Acid Substituted GTPase". ACS Catalysis. 7 (1): 902–906. doi:10.1021/acscatal.6b03365.
- Majumdar, Soneya; Acharya, Abhishek; Tomar, Sushil Kumar; Prakash, Balaji (March 2017). "Disrupting domain-domain interactions is indispensable for EngA-ribosome interactions". Biochimica et Biophysica Acta (BBA) - Proteins and Proteomics. 1865 (3): 289–303. doi:10.1016/j.bbapap.2016.12.005. PMID 27979707.
- Mehta, Sunita; Murugeson, Saravanan; Prakash, Balaji (August 2016). "Microbes based printing for fabrication of microlenses for organic light emitting diodes". Organic Electronics. 35: 199–207. doi:10.1016/j.orgel.2016.05.023.
- Mehta, Sunita; Murugeson, Saravanan; Prakash, Balaji; Deepak, Deepak (2016). "Development of a process for generating three-dimensional microbial patterns amenable for engineering use". RSC Advances. 6 (27): 22586–22593. Bibcode:2016RSCAd...622586M. doi:10.1039/C5RA26863J.
- Mehta, Sunita; Murugeson, Saravanan; Prakash, Balaji (21 October 2015). "Fabrication of three dimensional patterns of wide dimensional range using microbes and their applications". Scientific Reports. 5 (1) 15416. Bibcode:2015NatSR...515416M. doi:10.1038/srep15416. PMC 4613880. PMID 26486847.
- Kumar, Vinod; Murugeson, Saravanan; Vithani, Neha; Prakash, Balaji; Gowda, Lalitha R. (January 2015). "A salt-bridge stabilized C-terminal hook is critical for the dimerization of a Bowman Birk inhibitor". Archives of Biochemistry and Biophysics. 566: 15–25. doi:10.1016/j.abb.2014.12.011. PMID 25527163.
- Vithani, Neha; Bais, Vaibhav; Prakash, Balaji (June 2014). "GlmU ( N -acetylglucosamine-1-phosphate uridyltransferase) bound to three magnesium ions and ATP at the active site". Acta Crystallographica Section F. 70 (6): 703–708. doi:10.1107/S2053230X14008279. PMC 4051520. PMID 24915076.
- Singh, Shiv; Singh, Abhinav; Bais, Vaibhav Sushil Singh; Prakash, Balaji; Verma, Nishith (May 2014). "Multi-scale carbon micro/nanofibers-based adsorbents for protein immobilization". Materials Science and Engineering: C. 38: 46–54. doi:10.1016/j.msec.2014.01.042. PMID 24656351.
- Jain, Nikhil; Vithani, Neha; Rafay, Abu; Prakash, Balaji (November 2013). "Identification and characterization of a hitherto unknown nucleotide-binding domain and an intricate interdomain regulation in HflX-a ribosome binding GTPase". Nucleic Acids Research. 41 (20): 9557–9569. doi:10.1093/nar/gkt705. PMC 3814362. PMID 23956218.
- Jagtap, Pravin Kumar Ankush; Verma, Sunil Kumar; Vithani, Neha; Bais, Vaibhav Singh; Prakash, Balaji (May 2013). "Crystal Structures Identify an Atypical Two-Metal-Ion Mechanism for Uridyltransfer in GlmU: Its Significance to Sugar Nucleotidyl Transferases". Journal of Molecular Biology. 425 (10): 1745–1759. Bibcode:2013JMBio.425.1745J. doi:10.1016/j.jmb.2013.02.019. PMID 23485416.
- Anand, Baskaran; Majumdar, Soneya; Prakash, Balaji (12 February 2013). "Structural Basis Unifying Diverse GTP Hydrolysis Mechanisms". Biochemistry. 52 (6): 1122–1130. doi:10.1021/bi3014054. PMID 23293872.
- Gulati, Megha; Jain, Nikhil; Anand, Baskaran; Prakash, Balaji; Britton, Robert A. (March 2013). "Mutational analysis of the ribosome assembly GTPase RbgA provides insight into ribosome interaction and ribosome-stimulated GTPase activation". Nucleic Acids Research. 41 (5): 3217–3227. doi:10.1093/nar/gks1475. PMC 3597669. PMID 23325847.
- Jagtap, Pravin Kumar Ankush; Soni, Vijay; Vithani, Neha; Jhingan, Gagan Deep; Bais, Vaibhav Singh; Nandicoori, Vinay Kumar; Prakash, Balaji (November 2012). "Substrate-bound Crystal Structures Reveal Features Unique to Mycobacterium tuberculosis N-Acetyl-glucosamine 1-Phosphate Uridyltransferase and a Catalytic Mechanism for Acetyl Transfer". Journal of Biological Chemistry. 287 (47): 39524–39537. doi:10.1074/jbc.M112.390765. PMC 3501063. PMID 22969087.
- Rafay, Abu; Majumdar, Soneya; Prakash, Balaji (January 2012). "Exploring potassium-dependent GTP hydrolysis in TEES family GTPases". FEBS Open Bio. 2 (1): 173–177. doi:10.1016/j.fob.2012.07.008. PMC 3642159. PMID 23650596.
- Tomar, Sushil Kumar; Kumar, Prashant; Majumdar, Soneya; Bhaskar, Varun; Dutta, Prasun; Prakash, Balaji (January 2012). "Extended C-terminus and length of the linker connecting the G-domains are species-specific variations in the EngA family of GTPases". FEBS Open Bio. 2 (1): 191–195. doi:10.1016/j.fob.2012.07.009. PMC 3642160. PMID 23650599.
- Tomar, Sushil Kumar; Kumar, Prashant; Prakash, Balaji (May 2011). "Deciphering the catalytic machinery in a universally conserved ribosome binding ATPase YchF". Biochemical and Biophysical Research Communications. 408 (3): 459–464. Bibcode:2011BBRC..408..459T. doi:10.1016/j.bbrc.2011.04.052. PMID 21527254.
- Arora, Ashish; Chandra, Nagasuma R.; Das, Amit; Gopal, Balasubramanian; Mande, Shekhar C.; Prakash, Balaji; Ramachandran, Ravishankar; Sankaranarayanan, Rajan; Sekar, K.; Suguna, Kaza; Tyagi, Anil K.; Vijayan, Mamannamana (September 2011). "Structural biology of Mycobacterium tuberculosis proteins: The Indian efforts". Tuberculosis. 91 (5): 456–468. doi:10.1016/j.tube.2011.03.004. PMID 21514889.
- Anand, Baskaran; Surana, Parag; Prakash, Balaji (April 2010). "Deciphering the Catalytic Machinery in 30S Ribosome Assembly GTPase YqeH". PLOS ONE. 5 (4) e9944. Bibcode:2010PLoSO...5.9944A. doi:10.1371/journal.pone.0009944. PMC 2848588. PMID 20376346.
- Tiwari, Divya; Singh, Rajnish Kumar; Goswami, Kasturi; Verma, Sunil Kumar; Prakash, Balaji; Nandicoori, Vinay Kumar (2 October 2009). "Key residues in Mycobacterium tuberculosis protein kinase G play a role in regulating kinase activity and survival in the host". The Journal of Biological Chemistry. 284 (40): 27467–27479. doi:10.1074/jbc.M109.036095. PMC 2785676. PMID 19638631.
- Anand, Baskaran; Surana, Parag; Bhogaraju, Sagar; Pahari, Sushmita; Prakash, Balaji (September 2009). "Circularly permuted GTPase YqeH binds 30S ribosomal subunit: Implications for its role in ribosome assembly". Biochemical and Biophysical Research Communications. 386 (4): 602–606. Bibcode:2009BBRC..386..602A. doi:10.1016/j.bbrc.2009.06.078. PMC 2741578. PMID 19540197.
- Verma, Sunil Kumar; Jaiswal, Mamta; Kumar, Neeraj; Parikh, Amit; Nandicoori, Vinay Kumar; Prakash, Balaji (May 2009). "Structure of N -acetylglucosamine-1-phosphate uridyltransferase (GlmU) from Mycobacterium tuberculosis in a cubic space group". Acta Crystallographica Section F. 65 (5): 435–439. Bibcode:2009AcCrF..65..435V. doi:10.1107/S1744309109010252. PMC 2675579. PMID 19407371.
- Tomar, Sushil Kumar; Dhimole, Neha; Chatterjee, Moon; Prakash, Balaji (April 2009). "Distinct GDP/GTP bound states of the tandem G-domains of EngA regulate ribosome binding". Nucleic Acids Research. 37 (7): 2359–2370. doi:10.1093/nar/gkp107. PMC 2673443. PMID 19246542.
- Sajish, Mathew; Kalayil, Sissy; Verma, Sunil Kumar; Nandicoori, Vinay Kumar; Prakash, Balaji (April 2009). "The Significance of EXDD and RXKD Motif Conservation in Rel Proteins". Journal of Biological Chemistry. 284 (14): 9115–9123. doi:10.1074/jbc.M807187200. PMC 2666561. PMID 19201753.
- Jain, Nikhil; Dhimole, Neha; Khan, Abu Rafay; De, Debojyoti; Tomar, Sushil Kumar; Sajish, Mathew; Dutta, Dipak; Parrack, Pradeep; Prakash, Balaji (February 2009). "E. coli HflX interacts with 50S ribosomal subunits in presence of nucleotides". Biochemical and Biophysical Research Communications. 379 (2): 201–205. Bibcode:2009BBRC..379..201J. doi:10.1016/j.bbrc.2008.12.072. PMC 2686079. PMID 19109926.
- Parikh, Amit; Verma, Sunil Kumar; Khan, Shazia; Prakash, Balaji; Nandicoori, Vinay Kumar (February 2009). "PknB-Mediated Phosphorylation of a Novel Substrate, N-Acetylglucosamine-1-Phosphate Uridyltransferase, Modulates Its Acetyltransferase Activity". Journal of Molecular Biology. 386 (2): 451–464. doi:10.1016/j.jmb.2008.12.031. PMID 19121323.
- Sajish, Mathew; Tiwari, Divya; Rananaware, Dimple; Nandicoori, Vinay Kumar; Prakash, Balaji (November 2007). "A Charge Reversal Differentiates (p)ppGpp Synthesis by Monofunctional and Bifunctional Rel Proteins". Journal of Biological Chemistry. 282 (48): 34977–34983. doi:10.1074/jbc.M704828200. PMID 17911108.
- Anand, B. (28 April 2006). "Structural stabilization of GTP-binding domains in circularly permuted GTPases: Implications for RNA binding". Nucleic Acids Research. 34 (8): 2196–2205. doi:10.1093/nar/gkl178. PMC 1450330. PMID 16648363.
- Mishra, Rajeev; Gara, Sudheer Kumar; Mishra, Shambhavi; Prakash, Balaji (May 2005). "Analysis of GTPases carrying hydrophobic amino acid substitutions in lieu of the catalytic glutamine: Implications for GTP hydrolysis". Proteins: Structure, Function, and Bioinformatics. 59 (2): 332–338. doi:10.1002/prot.20413. PMID 15726588.
- Praefcke, Gerrit J.K.; Kloep, Stephan; Benscheid, Utz; Lilie, Hauke; Prakash, Balaji; Herrmann, Christian (November 2004). "Identification of Residues in the Human Guanylate-binding Protein 1 Critical for Nucleotide Binding and Cooperative GTP Hydrolysis". Journal of Molecular Biology. 344 (1): 257–269. doi:10.1016/j.jmb.2004.09.026. PMID 15504415.
- Rehmann, Holger; Prakash, Balaji; Wolf, Eva; Rueppel, Alma; de Rooij, Johan; Bos, Johannes L.; Wittinghofer, Alfred (January 2003). "Structure and regulation of the cAMP-binding domains of Epac2". Nature Structural Biology. 10 (1): 26–32. doi:10.1038/nsb878. PMID 12469113.
- Prakash, B. (September 2000). "Triphosphate structure of guanylate-binding protein 1 and implications for nucleotide binding and GTPase mechanism". The EMBO Journal. 19 (17): 4555–4564. doi:10.1093/emboj/19.17.4555. PMC 302049. PMID 10970849.
- Prakash, Balaji; Praefcke, Gerrit J. K.; Renault, Louis; Wittinghofer, Alfred; Herrmann, Christian (February 2000). "Structure of human guanylate-binding protein 1 representing a unique class of GTP-binding proteins". Nature. 403 (6769): 567–571. Bibcode:2000Natur.403..567P. doi:10.1038/35000617. PMID 10676968.
- Prakash, Balaji; Murthy, M. R. N.; Sreerama, Y. N.; Rao, D. Rajagopal; Gowda, Lalitha R. (December 1997). "Studies on simultaneous inhibition of trypsin and chymotrypsin by horsegram Bowman-Birk inhibitor". Journal of Biosciences. 22 (5): 545–554. doi:10.1007/BF02703392.
- Prakash, Balaji; Murthy, M.R.N. (1997). "Source and target enzyme signature in serine protease inhibitor active site sequences". Journal of Biosciences. 22 (5): 555–556. doi:10.1007/BF02703393.
- Prakash, Balaji; Selvaraj, S.; Murthy, M. R. N.; Sreerama, Y. N.; Rajagopal Rao, D.; Gowda, Lalitha R. (May 1996). "Analysis of the amino acid sequences of plant Bowman-Birk inhibitors". Journal of Molecular Evolution. 42 (5): 560–569. Bibcode:1996JMolE..42..560P. doi:10.1007/BF02352286. PMID 8662008.
- Prakash, Balaji; Murthy, M.R.N.; Sreerama, Y.N.; Rama Sarma, P.R.; Rao, D. Rajagopal (January 1994). "Crystallization and preliminary X-ray diffraction studies on a trypsin/chymotrypsin double-headed inhibitor from horse gram". Journal of Molecular Biology. 235 (1): 364–366. doi:10.1016/S0022-2836(05)80041-5. PMID 8289258.
- Vithani, Neha; Prakash, Balaji (2015). "GlmU from Mycobacterium tuberculosis – Structure, Function, and the Role of Metal Ions in Catalysis". Encyclopedia of Inorganic and Bioinorganic Chemistry. pp. 1–9. doi:10.1002/9781119951438.eibc2327. ISBN 978-1-119-95143-8.

== See also ==
- Bowman–Birk protease inhibitor
- Dolichos lablab
