= Harvest Automation =

American robotics company

Harvest Automation, Inc. is a robotics company headquartered in Billerica, Massachusetts, that manufactures small, mobile material handling robots for nursery, greenhouse and eCommerce fulfillment applications.

== History ==
Harvest Automation Inc. was founded in 2009 by former iRobot employees on the premise that there are many examples of work in the world that are repetitive, strenuous and dangerous and that can benefit from robotic automation. Roomba inventors Joseph Jones and Paul Sandin, and Roomba engineer Clara Vu, founded the company along with CEO Charles Grinnell, who served as Lead Engineer of a $300 million particle detector at CERN – Europe's international physics research center.

Since the formation of Harvest Automation, Inc., the company has received funding from various investors totaling at $30.6 million. The company competes with Kiva Systems, the manufacturer of warehouse robots that was acquired by Amazon in 2012.

== Products & Markets ==
=== OmniVeyor HV-100 ===
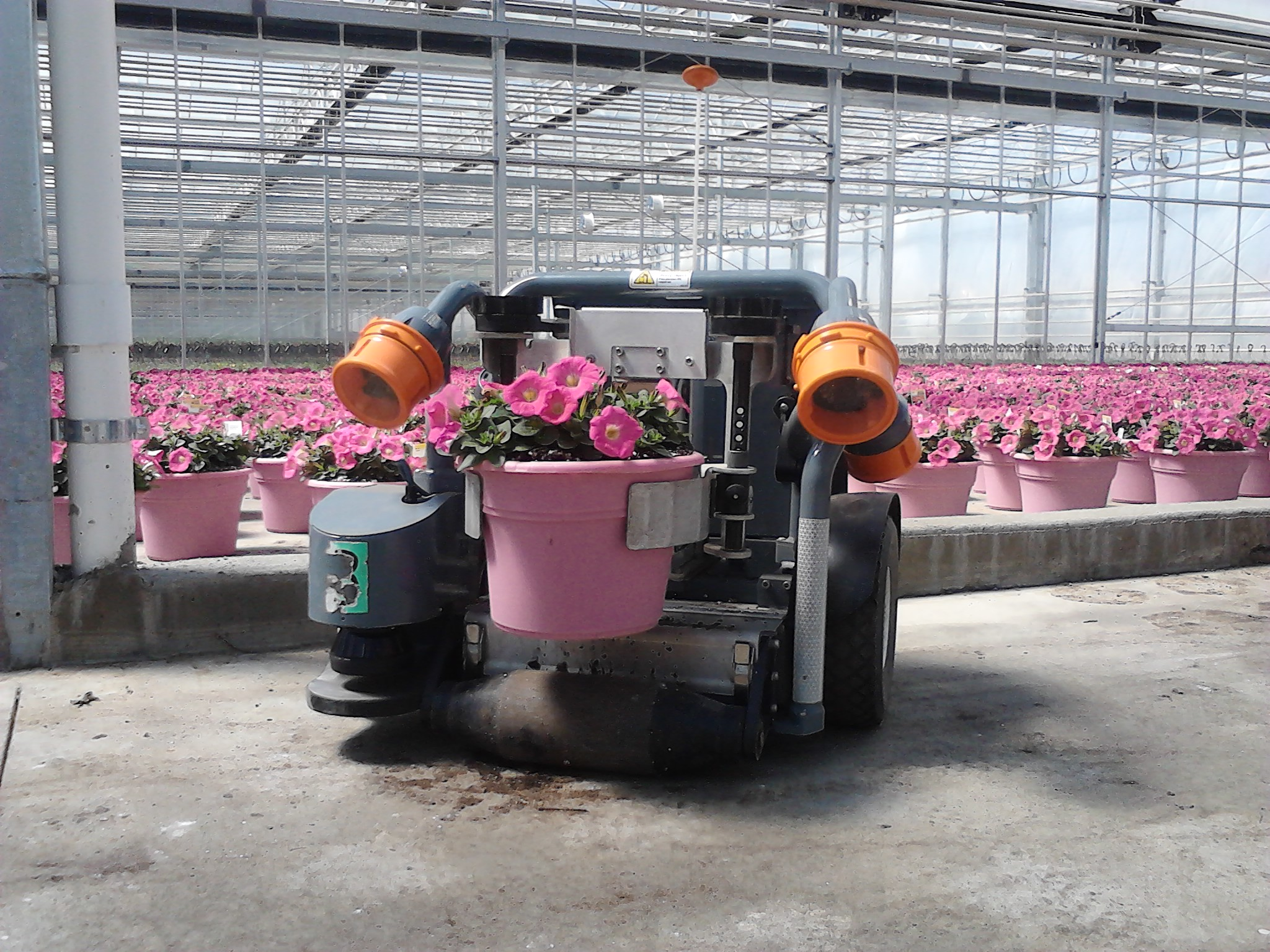
Harvest Automation OmniVeyor HV-100 Robot

Harvest Automation’s first product is the OmniVeyor HV-100, providing automated material handling for the nursery and greenhouse market. OmniVeyor HV-100 units are designed for operation in both indoor and outdoor environments as typically seen on wholesale greenhouses, hoop houses and nurseries. The robots are intended to reduce production costs and increase overall productivity.

OmniVeyor HV-100 robots automate the task of spacing containerized plants, common to wholesale Nursery and Greenhouse operations. When plants are young they are placed in close proximity to one another on fields in order to conserve resources such as land, water and pesticides. As the plants grow their containers must be spaced apart to allow the plants to develop a uniform and consistent canopy. The task of spacing plants has historically been completed with manual labor.

=== OmniVeyor TM-100 ===
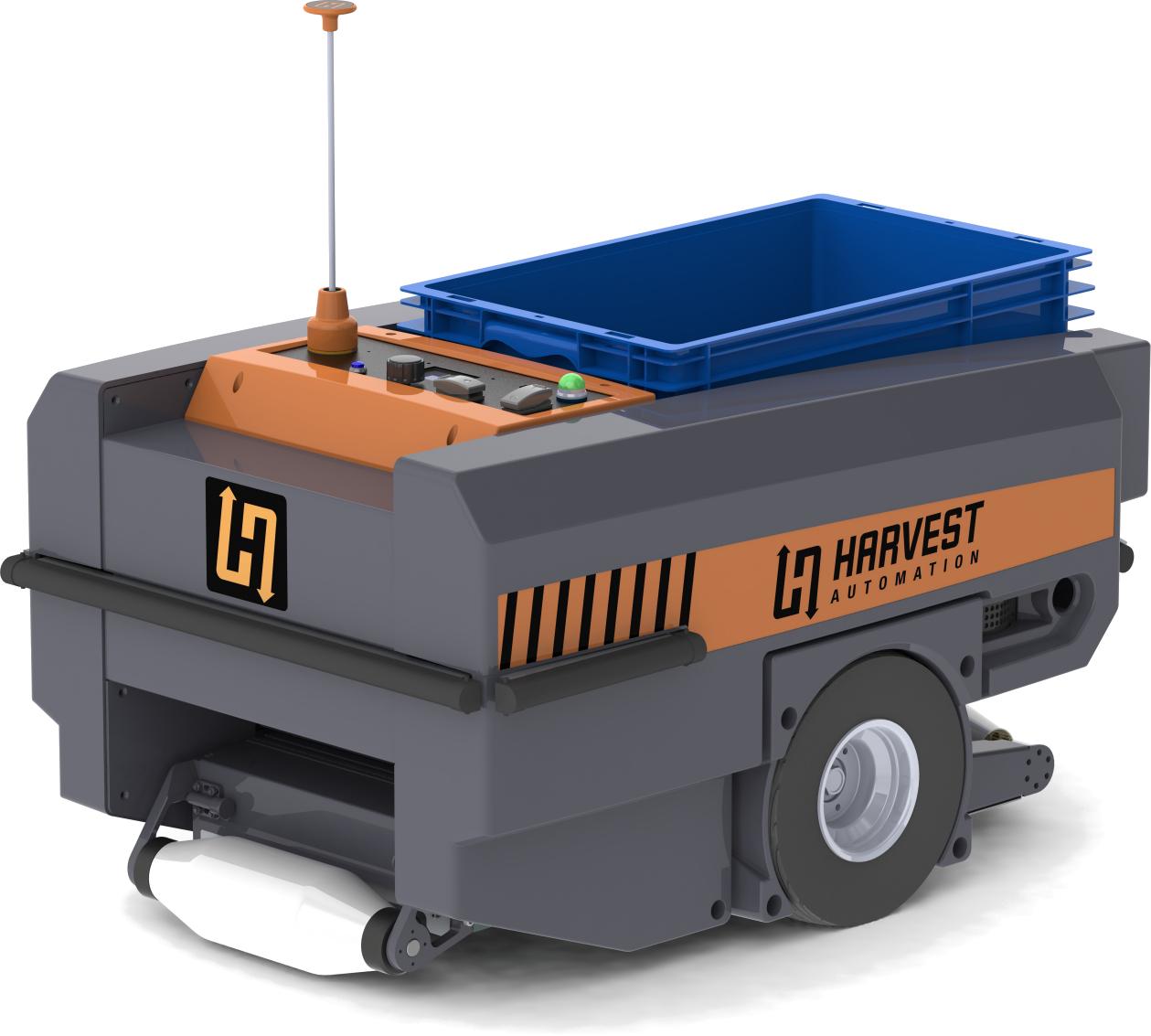
Harvest Automation OmniVeyor TM-100 Robot

The OmniVeyor TM-100 robot is designed to automate material handling for the eCommerce market. OmniVeyor TM-100 robots are designed to work with and among existing workforces and infrastructure.

The OmniVeyor TM-100 robots work by autonomously handling material movement and sortation and thereby eliminating the need for workers to walk long distances between picking products for order fulfillment. By virtue of its small size and weight and integrated obstacle detection and collision avoidance systems the robot is able to work in the same space as people. The OmniVeyor TM-100 robot is designed to allow for batch and single order processing as well as interleaved replenishment and returns processing.
