= List of poets from Budh Sabha =

This is the list of poets which is raised from the Budh Sabha, a literary workshop for Gujarati poetry in Ahmedabad.

== List ==
- Adil Mansuri
- Anil Chavda
- Ankit Trivedi
- Ashok Chavda
- Balmukund Dave
- Bhavesh Bhatt
- Chandrakant Sheth
- Chinu Modi
- Dhiru Parikh
- Hardwar Goswami
- Harshad Trivedi
- Labhshankar Thakar
- Madhav Ramanuj
- Manhar Modi
- Niranjan Bhagat
- Pravin Pandya
- Priyakant Maniar
- Radheshyam Sharma
- Raghuveer Chaudhari
- Rajendra Shah
- Rajendra Shukla
- Rajesh Vyas
- Ravji Patel
- Sundaram
- Umashankar Joshi
- Venibhai Purohit
- Yogesh Joshi
- Yoseph Macwan

== See also ==
- List of Gujarati-language writers
