= Budh Sabha =

Literary workshop on Gujarati poetry

- Poetry workshop
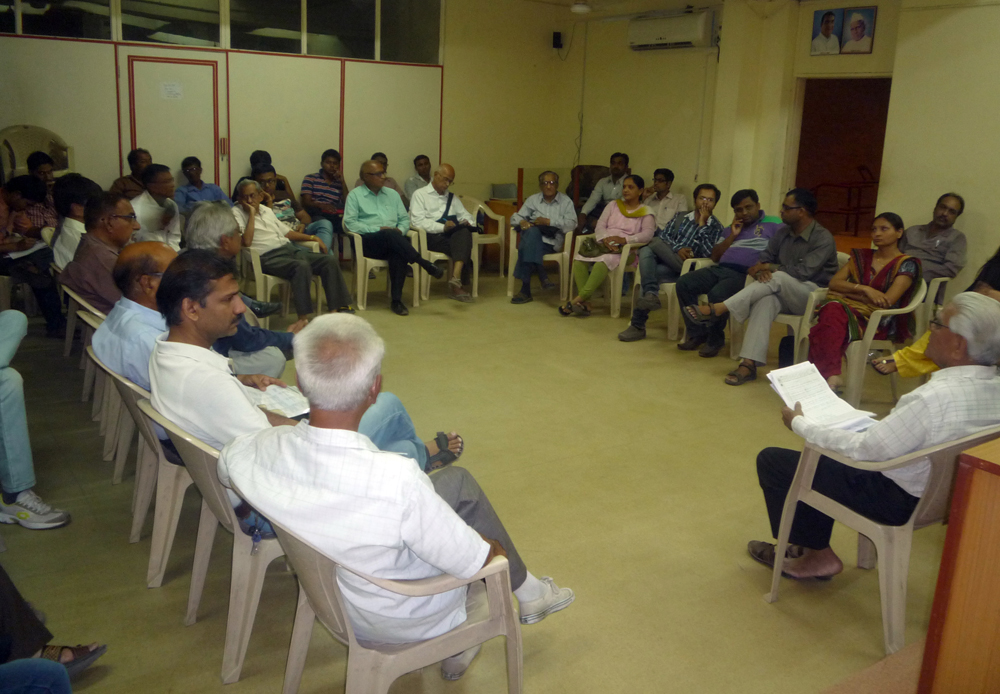
- Budh Sabha, April 2014
- President: Dhiru Parikh
- Founder: Bachubhai Ravat
- Established: 1932
- State: Gujarat
- City: Ahmedabad
- Location: Gujarati Sahitya Parishad

Budh Sabha is a weekly literary workshop on Gujarati poetry held on every Wednesday since 1932. It is currently presided by writer Dhiru Parikh and held at Gujarati Sahitya Parishad, Ahmedabad.

== History ==
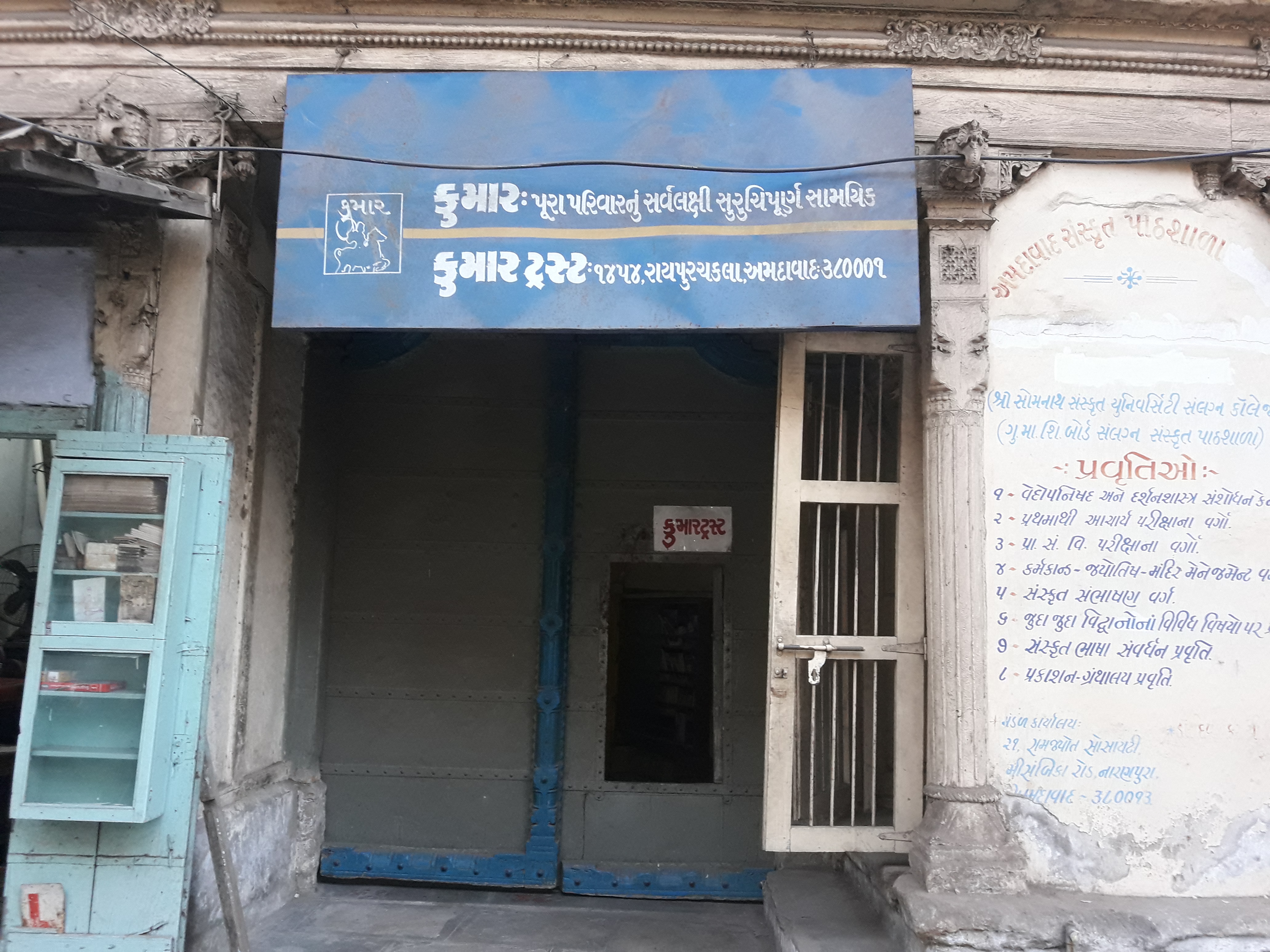
Kumar office

During the Indian independence movement, Umashankar Joshi, Sundaram and Ramprasad Shukla used to go to office of Kumar magazine at night and used to discuss their poetry. During the same time, a photography club called Niharika used to gather there every week. Shivram Bhatt, a member of Niharika, suggested weekly poetry workshop on the same line. So the weekly Budh Sabha, literally Wednesday meet, was established in 1932 by Bachubhai Ravat, then editor of Kumar magazine. It used to be held at the office of Kumar at Raipur Chakla in Ahmedabad. A month before death of Ravat in July 1980, the venue was shifted to Gujarati Sahitya Parishad which was then located in premises of H. K. Arts College and Dhiru Parikh become the president of Budh Sabha who had joined the Budh Sabha as a student in 1966. When the new building of Parishad was constructed on bank of Sabarmati River (now Riverfront), the venue was shifted there. It was initially known as "Budhvariyun" which was later renamed "Budh Bethak" and finally "Budh Sabha".

Taking inspiration from the meet, similar weekly meets are organised in other cities of Gujarat including Surendranagar, Vadodara, Rajkot and Bhavnagar.

In Budh Sabha, the president Dhiru Parikh (Bachubhai Ravat formerly) collects poems from all attending poets first. Then each poem is recited and discussed without revealing the name of poet. If the poem deemed good after discussion, it gets published in poetry magazine Kavilok (in Kumar formerly). In 1998, similar workshop called Shani Sabha (Saturday Meet) is also started by Chinu Modi for the modern poets.

Budh Sabha helped nurture several prominent Gujarati poets and writers like Umashankar Joshi, Rajendra Shah, Harshad Trivedi, Chinu Modi, Niranjan Bhagat, Raghuveer Chaudhari, Pravin Pandya, Rajendra Shukla, Rajesh Vyas, Bhavesh Bhatt, Anil Chavda and Ashok Chavda.

== See also ==
- List of poets from Budh Sabha
