= List of Sahitya Akademi Translation Prize winners for Rajasthani =

List of winners of a literary honor in India

Part of a series on

Sahitya Akademi Awards
Category
Sahitya Akademi Award winners by language
- Assamese
- Bengali
- Bodo
- Dogri
- English
- Gujarati
- Hindi
- Kannada
- Kashmiri
- Konkani
- Maithili
- Malayalam
- Marathi
- Meitei (Manipuri)
- Nepali
- Odia
- Punjabi
- Rajasthani
- Sanskrit
- Santali
- Sindhi
- Tamil
- Telugu
- Urdu
Sahitya Akademi Translation Prizes
- Assamese
- Bengali
- Bodo
- Dogri
- English
- Gujarati
- Hindi
- Kannada
- Kashmiri
- Konkani
- Maithili
- Malayalam
- Marathi
- Meitei (Manipuri)
- Nepali
- Odia
- Punjabi
- Rajasthani
- Sanskrit
- Santali
- Sindhi
- Tamil
- Telugu
- Urdu
Sahitya Akademi Yuva Puraskar
- Assamese
- Bengali
- Bodo
- Dogri
- English
- Gujarati
- Hindi
- Kannada
- Kashmiri
- Konkani
- Maithili
- Malayalam
- Meitei (Manipuri)
- Marathi
- Nepali
- Odia
- Punjabi
- Rajasthani
- Sanskrit
- Santali
- Sindhi
- Tamil
- Telugu
- Urdu
Sahitya Akademi Bal Sahitya Puraskar
- Assamese
- Bengali
- Bodo
- Dogri
- English
- Gujarati
- Hindi
- Kannada
- Kashmiri
- Konkani
- Maithili
- Malayalam
- Meitei (Manipuri)
- Marathi
- Nepali
- Odia
- Punjabi
- Rajasthani
- Sanskrit
- Santali
- Sindhi
- Tamil
- Telugu
- Urdu
Related
- Eighth Schedule to the Constitution of India
- Official Languages Commission
- List of languages by number of native speakers in India

Sahitya Akademi Translation Prizes are awarded each year since 1989 by the Indian National Academy of Letters to writers for their outstanding translations work in the 24 languages.

== Recipients ==
Following is the list of recipients of Sahitya Akademi Translation Prizes for their works written in Rajasthani. The award, as of 2019, consisted of ₹50,000.

Year	Translator	Title of the translation	Original Title	Original Language	Genre	Original Author	References
1990	Deo Dutta Nag	Sapano	Svapnavasavadattam	Sanskrit	Play	Bhasa	
1991	Kishore Kalpanakant	Banadan Ro Saudagar	Nasbandagi	Hindi	Satire	Shyam Goyanka	
1992	Shreelall Nathmalji Joshi	Hakumat Janta Ri	lyaruingam	Assamese	Novel	Birendra Kumar Bhattacharya	
1993	Shakti Dan Kaviya	Dharati Ghani Rupali	Selected 50 Poems of Tarun	Hindi	Poetry	Rameshwar Lal Khandelwal Tarun	
1994	Venkat Sharma	Bhartrihari Satak	Shatak Trayam	Sanskrit	Poetry	Bhartrihari	
1995	Chandra Prakash Deval	Kaal Mein Kurjan	Akal Mein Sara's	Hindi	Poetry	Kedarnath Singh	
1996	Bhagwatilal Vyas	Batyodi Rassi	Buni Hui Rassi	Hindi	Poetry	Bhawani Prasad Mishra	
1997	Nrisingh Rajpurohit	Dhoor Mem Paglia	Dhool Mein Paglia	Gujarati	Reminiscences	Chandrakant Sheth	
1998	Kailash Kabir	Khoontlyan Mathai Tangyoda Log	Khoontiyon Par Tange Log	Hindi	Poetry	Sarveshwar Dayal Saxena	
2000	Vinod Somani Hans	Magadh	Magadh	Hindi	Poetry	Srikant Verma	
2001	Badri Dan Gadan	Bansuri	Odakkuzhal	Malayalam	Poetry	G. Sankara Kurup	
2002	Satyanarayan Swami	Mrityunjay	Mrityunjay	Marathi	Novel	Shivaji Sawant	
2003	Ram Swaroop Kisan	Rati Kaner	Rakt Karabi	Bengali	Play	Rabindranath Tagore	
2004	Kundan Mali	Gosthi	Gosthi	Gujarati	Essays	Umashankar Joshi	
2005	Upendra Anu	Kale Sambharju Mhane	Kal Sunana Mujhe	Hindi	Poetry	Dhumil	
2006	Aidan Singh Bhati	Gandhiji Ki Atma Katha	Gandhiji Ki Atam Katha	Hindi	Autobiography	Mahatma Gandhi	
2007	Ramnaresh Soni	Saat Fera Abhai Mein	Saat Paglan Aakash man	Hindi	Poetry	Kundanika Kapadia	
2008	Jethmal H. Maru	Angaliat	Angaliat	Gujarati	Novel	Joseph Macwan	
2009	Arjun Singh Shekhawat	Van Ra Varis	Aranyer Adhikar	Bengali	Novel	Mahasweta Devi	
2010	Shankar Singh Rajpurohit	Gananayak	Gananayak	Maithili	Short Stories	Saket Anand	
2011	Kamal Ranga	Ek chadar Meili Si	Ek Chadar Meili Si	Urdu	Novel	Rajinder Singh Bedi	
2012	Purn Sharma Puran	Gora	Gora	Bengali	Novel	Rabindranath Tagore	
2013	Shanti Bhardwaj Rakesh	Ardhnarishwar	Ardhanarishwar	Hindi	Novel	Vishnu Prabhakar	
2014	Kailash Mandela	Kural-Kavya	Tirukkural	Tamil	Poetry	Tiruvalluvar	
2015	Madan Saint	Madan Bavniyo	Madan Bavniya	Hindi	Novel	Rajendra Kedia	
2016	Ravi Purohit	Jeevo Mahara Sanwara	Mere Saayian Jio	Punjabi	Poetry	Bhai Veer Singh	
2017	Krishna Jakhar	Gatha Tista Par Ri	Tista Parer Brittanta	Bengali	Novel	Debesh Roy	
2018	Manoj Kumar Swami	Naav Aar Jaal	Chemmeen	Malayalam	Novel	Thakazhi Shivashankara Pillai	
2019	Dev Kothari	Charu-Vasanta	Charu Vasantha	Kannada	Poetry	Nadoj H.P Nagarajaiah	
2020	Ghanshyam Nath Kachhawa	Gharbayaro	Aghari Atmar Kahini	Assamese	Novel	Syed Abdul Malik	
2021	Sanjay Purohit	Heli Rai Maany	Inside the Haveli	English	Novel	Rama Mehta	
2022	Madan Gopal Ladha	Akhoot Tasalo	Akhepatar	Gujarati	Novel	Bindu Bhatt	
2023	Bhanwar Lal ‘Bhramar’	Sarokar	Sarokar	Maithili	Short Stories	Pradip Bihari	

== See also ==
- List of Sahitya Akademi Award winners for Rajasthani
