= Bahadurbhai Vank =

Gujarati short story writer, painter

- Born: 13 May 1937 (age 89); Jetpur, Rajkot, Gujarat, India
- Education: SSC
- Occupations: short story writer, painter
- Spouse: Manjulbahen
- Writing career
- Language: Gujarati
- Notable work
- Notable awards: Kumar Suvarna Chandrak (2005)

Bahadurbhai Vank (born 13 May 1937) is a Gujarati language writer and painter from Gujarat, India.

== Biography ==
Vank was born on 13 May 1937 at Jetpur, Rajkot and grew up in Junagadh. His father was an administrator for the government. Being born into poverty, he started school at a late age. In his childhood, he resorted to drawing on a slate or in some dust, and read children's stories.

In 1958, he entered university and received a Sahitya Ratna degree in Sanskrit. He also obtained a diploma in illustration and a certificate of calligraphy from the Dehradun Graphology Institute.

The same year, Vank got a job in the Gujarat State Road Transport Corporation and later was promoted to a senior clerk position. He retired in 1988. During this time he was writing and publishing stories. In addition to writing, he also painted, was a photographer, and studied astrology.

The Gujarat State Museum had exhibited his paintings at the Tarnetar fair.

== Painting ==
Vank was not taught how to paint, rather he was inspired after seeing a painting exhibition in Ahmedabad in 1970. He studied books of renowned artists and painted from 1976 to 1986. Initially, his paintings were displayed at the Gujarat Rajya Lalitkala Akademi exhibition. He was also selected for the Artist's Camp in Abu in 1982. Ravishankar Raval praised his sketches. His solo exhibitions have been held at the Jehangir Art Gallery in Mumbai as well as in Ahmedabad, Allahabad, Bhuj, and Rajkot. His paintings were awarded in the International Painting Exhibition in Delhi in 1978. The depiction of human consciousness, despair, pain, and irony has been the main themes of his painting.

In 1982, he developed glaucoma, and was advised by doctors to stop painting. In 1984–85, he painted Pandurang Shastri for the Prayagraj Teerth Sammelan. Later on, he underwent eye surgery, but only five to ten percent of his vision could be restored. His focus then turned to writing.

== Writing ==
In 1963, his first short story Modinu Bill was published in Chandni Magazine. In 1986, his short story Honarat was published. His collection of stories titled Pichho was published in 1988. In 1993, Vinayak Vishad Yoga, and later in 1995 Rafdo were published. His short story Ishwar was published in 1993. Another story collection titled Jangaleshwar Namnu Mahavidyalaya was published in 2009. Five stories in the collection, which were deemed unsuitable, were modified and included in the 2014 collection Niche Nahi Dharati, Upar Nahi Akash. He has also written essays, critiques, and zen stories. These zen stories have been published for twelve years in Kumar. Many of his meditation stories have also been published in the English weekly of Saurashtra.

== Recognition ==
Vank's two story collections Vinayak Vishad Yoga and Rafado had won the awards from the Gujarat Sahitya Akademi. Rafdo was also awarded the Dhumketu Navlika Puraskar. The meditation stories published for twelve years in Kumar received the Kumar Suvarna Chandrak in 2005.

== See also ==
- List of Gujarati-language writers
