= Harshad Trivedi =

Indian poet, short story writer, critic and editor (born 1958)

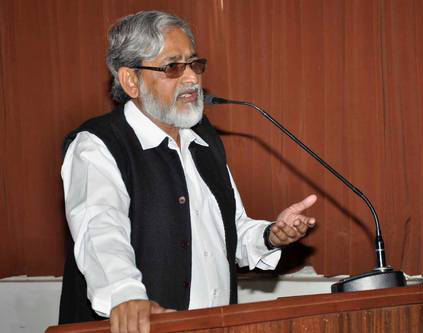
- Harshad Trivedi At Gujarati Sahitya Parishad, 2014
- Born: July 17, 1958 (age 68); Kherali, Surendranagar, Gujarat
- Education: Saurashtra University
- Occupations: poet, short story writer, critic, editor
- Spouse: Bindu Bhatt (m. 1991)
- Children: Jayjit Trivedi
- Writing career
- Language: Gujarati
- Period: Postmodern Gujarati literature
- Notable awards: Kavishwar Dalpatram Award (2014); Kumar Suvarna Chandrak (2015)

Signature
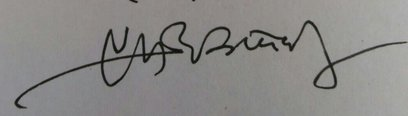

Harshad Trivedi (born 17 July 1958) is a Gujarati language poet, short story writer, critic and editor from Gujarat, India. He was an editor of Shabdasrishti, an organ of Gujarat Sahitya Akademi, from 1995 to 2015. Trivedi has served in different positions at several Gujarati literary institutions. As of 2023, he is president of Gujarati Sahitya Parishad (Gujarati Literary Council).

== Early life ==
Trivedi was born in Kherali, a village in the Surendranagar district, to Amrutlal and Shashikala. His father was a poet. Trivedi completed his school education at Sheth N.T.M. High School in Surendranagar. Trivedi received his Bachelor of Arts and Master of Arts degrees from Saurashtra University with a concentration in Gujarati literature. In 1991, Trivedi married Bindu Bhatt, a Gujarati author.

== Career ==
Trivedi started his career as a research assistant at the editorial section of Gujarati Sahitya Kosh, published by Gujarati Sahitya Parishad, where he worked from 1981 to 1984. In 1984, he joined Gujarat Sahitya Akademi as a proof reader and worked there for a decade until 1994. He became editor of Shabdasrishti, an organ of Gujarat Sahitya Akademi, in 1995 where he served for another decade. At Shabdasrishti he also worked as a registrar from 2010 to 2015. Trivedi was selected as a member of the Central Committee of Gujarati Sahitya Parishad in 1988 and as a member of the Working Committee of Parishad in 1994. From 2002 to 2006, he served as secretary of the Parishad. Trivedi was one of the members of the Working Committee of Vali Gujarati Gazal Kendra starting in 2005. From 2008 to 2012, he served in the Advisory Committee for Gujarati language at Sahitya Akademi. In 2013, he was elected to the Advisory Committee for Gujarati Language at the National Book Trust. Many of Trivedi's works have been translated to English, Hindi, Marathi, and Sindhi. His poems and stories are published in several Gujarati literary magazines including Gazalvishwa, Shabdasrishti, Tadarthya, Shabdasar, Navneet Samarpan, Kumar, Kavilok, Etad, Samipe, and Kavita.

== Works ==
Ek Khali Naav, his first poetry collection, was published in 1984, followed by Rahi Chhe Vaat Adhuri (2002), Taro Awaaj (2003) and Taraveni (2014). The technical mastery and linguistic and thematic richness of his poems gained him critical acclaim. Trivedi writes about rural life as well as urban life in his poems. His first book of short stories was Jaaliyun (1994). The stories of Jaaliyun deal with various themes – the sweet memories of childhood, the pain of an impotent husband, the daily boring routine of office life, a woman's attraction to someone other than her husband, and a lesbian relationship. Paani Kalar (1990) is a collection of his children's work while Shabdanubhav is a collection of critical writings.

=== Edited books ===
- Gujarati Kavitachayan, 1991 (selected poems of the year from magazines; 1992)
- Smaranrekh (remembering late litterateurs; 1997)
- Gazalshatak (Gujarati ghazals; 1999)
- Gurjar Adyatan Nibhandsanchaya (with Bholabhai Patel; 1999)
- 1998 ni Shreshth Vartao (1999)
- Tapseel (interviews with litterateurs; 1999)
- 2000 ni Shreshth Vartao (2001)
- Vedna Eto Ved (songs by Ushnas; 2001)
- Lalitya (Gujarati essays; 2004)
- Kavyaswad (appreciation of Gujarati poems; 2006)
- Rajendra Shah Na Sonnet (2007)
- Alankruta (appreciation of Sahitya Akademi Award winner Gujarati books; 2008)
- Asmitaparva : Vakdhara Volume 1-10 (inspired by Morari Bapu; 2008)
- Navalkatha ane Hu (2009)
- Panch Dayakanu Paridarshan (2011)

== Awards ==
His anthology Ek Khali Naav was awarded the Jayant Pathak Poetry Award in 1992. He also received the Kavishwar Dalpatram Award in 2014. "Kankuchokha", his feature of Gujarati folk songs and the social life of Gujarat, serialized in Kumar magazine, won the Kumar Suvarna Chandrak literary award in 2015.

== See also ==
- List of Gujarati-language writers
