= Praful Raval =

Gujarati poet and writer from India

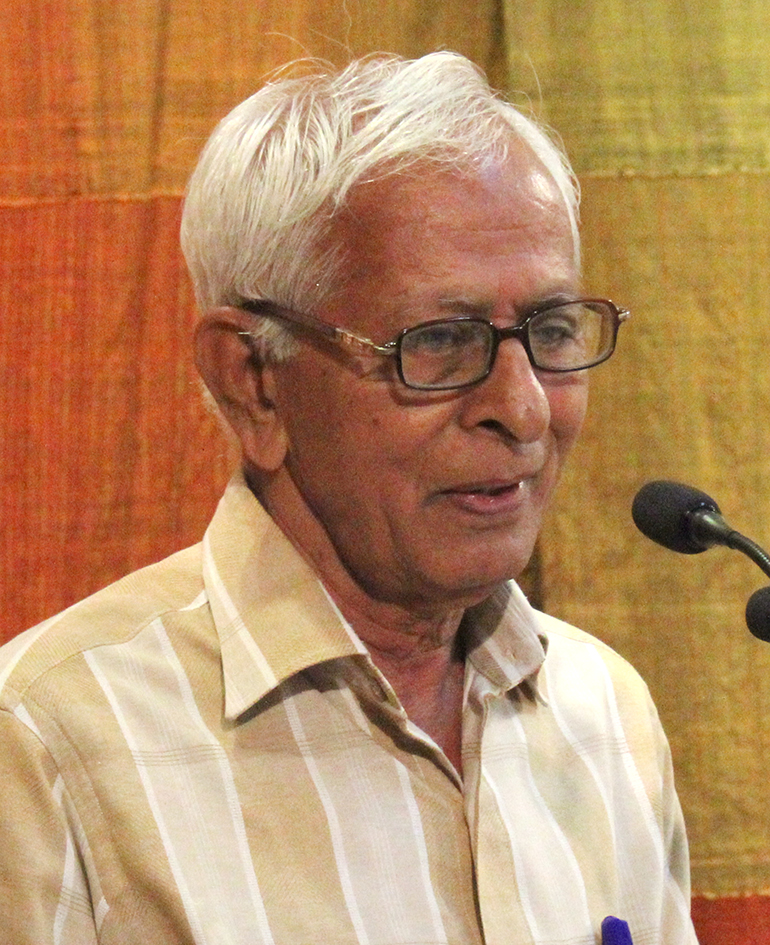
- at Gujarat Vishwakosh Trust, 11 May 2019
- Born: Praful Jagjivandas Raval; September 5, 1948 (age 77); Viramgam, Gujarat
- Education: Master of Arts; PhD
- Alma mater: Gujarat University
- Occupations: Poet, essayist, short story writer, editor
- Writing career
- Language: Gujarati
- Years active

Academic background
- Doctoral advisor: Dhiru Parikh
- Notable awards: Kumar Suvarna Chandrak (1982)

Praful Raval is a Gujarati teacher, poet, essayist and short story writer. Raval is a co-editor of Kavilok and Kumar and works as a general secretary of Gujarati Sahitya Parishad. He received Kumar Suvarna Chandrak in 1982.

== Early life ==
Raval was born on 5 September 1948 in Viramgam to Jagjivandas and Subhadraben.

Raval completed SSC from Sheth M. J High School, Viramgam. He completed his Bachelor of Arts from C. M Desai Arts and Commerce College, Viramgam in Gujarati and joined the School of Language, Gujarat University. He completed a Master of Arts, a Master of Philosophy and Ph.D.

== Career ==
Raval taught at L. C Kanya Vidyalaya, Viramgam from 1970 to 1983 and Sheth M. J High School, Viramgam from 1983 to 1984.

In 1984, he founded Kruti Prakashan, a publishing company.

In 1992, he founded a primary school namely Shishu Niketan, later known as Setu Vidyalaya. In 1995, he founded another school, Sarjan Vidyamandir, and served there as principal until 2006.

In 2012, he became co-editor of Kumar. He works as general secretary of Gujarati Sahitya Parishad.

== Works ==
=== Poetry ===
- Aavtikalni Shodh ma (2011)
- Minoee Sachu Kaheti'ti (2014)

=== Biographical essays ===
- Nokha-Anokha (1985)
- Ba Etle (2001)
- Manas Ae To Manas (2014)

=== Short stories ===
- Pakelo Andhkar

== Recognition ==
He received Kumar Suvarna Chandrak in 1982.
