= Gopinath Pillai =

Singaporean diplomat (born 1937)

Gopinath Pillai DUBC BBM
- ഗോപിനാഥ് പിള്ള
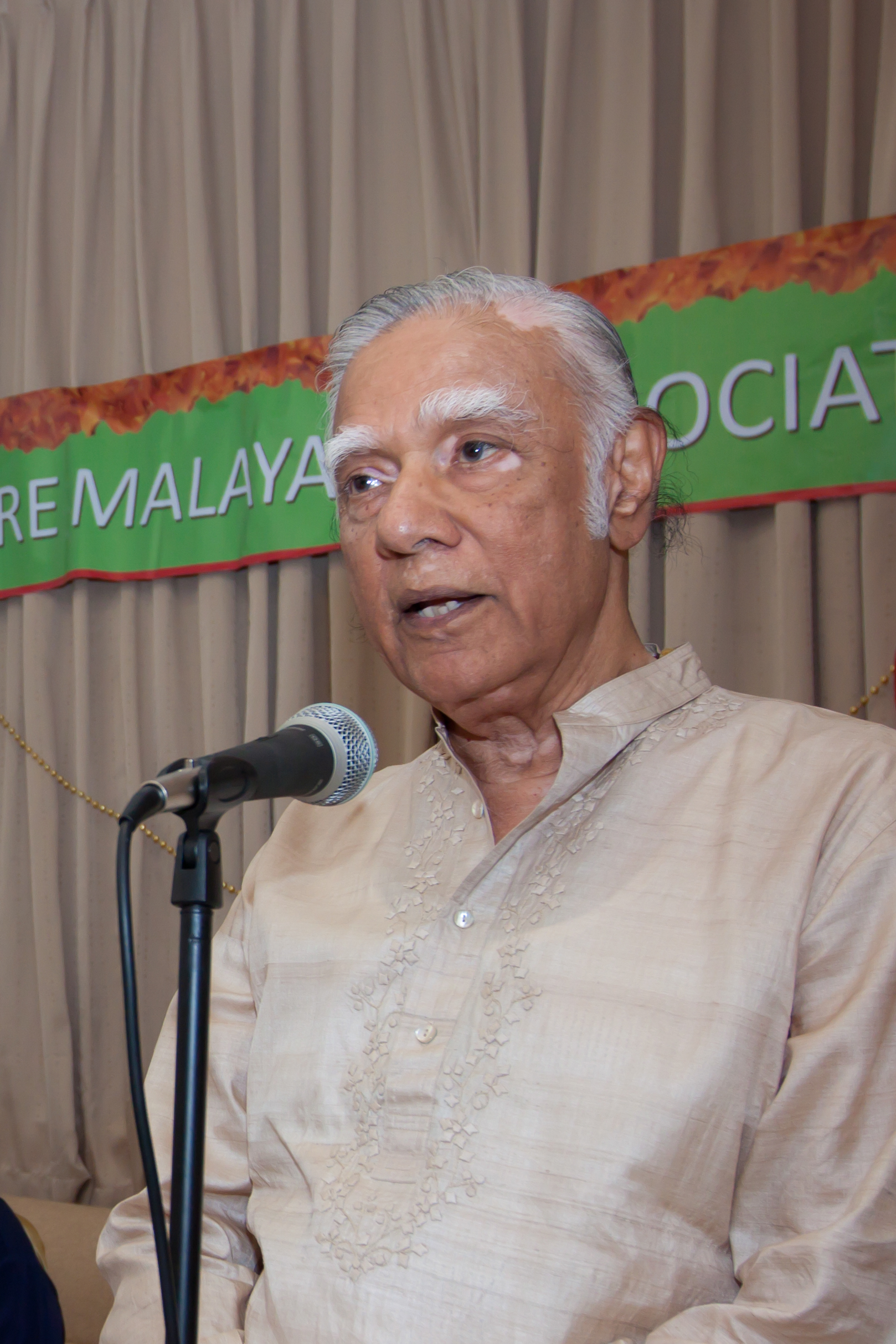
- Pillai in 2011
- Born: 1937 (age 88–89); Singapore, Straits Settlements
- Education: University of Malaya (BA)
- Occupations: Diplomat; businessman
- Children: 4
- Parent: K.S. Pillai (father)

Gopinath Pillai DUBC BBM (born 1937) is a Singaporean diplomat and businessman who served as an ambassador-at-large at the Ministry of Foreign Affairs.

In 2012, Pillai was conferred the Padma Shri by the Indian government, the fourth highest Indian civilian award.

== Early life ==
Pillai was born in Singapore to K. S. Pillai, a journalist who ran a daily, Kerala Bandhu, known to be the only Malayalam language daily published outside India. He spent eight years of his childhood in Kerala, India, where his family is from, as he could not return to Singapore due to the outbreak of World War II. After the closure of the daily, his family finances dwindled and Pillai opted for a government-funded education. He graduated from the University of Malaya with a Bachelor of Arts degree in 1961 and was a member of the Socialist Club.

== Career ==
Pillai started his career as a journalist with Reuters but had to abandon the job to fulfil his commitment to the government to work as a teacher, a prerequisite for availing government funding for education in Singapore. He subsequently joined Bangkok Bank as an Economic Research Officer and worked as a correspondent for the Far Eastern Economic Review. He worked at the bank for five years before moving to Malaysian Industrial Development Finance Bhd as an economist, during which Singapore had become a separate country in 1965. He stayed in Malaysia until 1969, when he returned to Singapore with his family to take up an appointment as the head of a government-owned textile factory. He later worked at United Industrial Corporation and then the State Trading Corporation for around 10 years in total.

He has authored two books, The History of Banking in Thailand and The Political Economy of South Asian Diaspora: Patterns of Socio-Economic Influence in 2013.

Pillai served the first chairman of NTUC FairPrice after its establishment in 1983, a position he held until 1993. He remains as a Trustee of NTUC FairPrice.

Pillai launched KSP Group along with two of his friends, Sat Pal Khattar and Haider Sithawalla, and holds the post of a Director of the company. The company has since been rebranded as KSP Investments Private Limited, and serves as the holding company for Pillai's business investments. He is reported to have invested in a number of businesses and holds positions in many of them. He is the executive chairman of Savant Infocomm, an IT company, Playware Studios Pte Ltd and holds the chairmanship of companies such as Windmill International Private Limited and Gateway Distriparks Limited and one of its subsidiaries, Snowman Logistics Limited. He is the director of another Gateway Distriparks subsidiary, Gateway Rail Freight Limited and JTC Consultancy Services (Holdings) Private Limited. He is also the director of AEC Edu Group Private Limited and holds directorship of two of its subsidiaries, AEC College and AEC Education Plc.

Pillai is the chairman of the Management Board of the Institute of South Asian Studies, a National University of Singapore-funded research institute. He also holds the post of the deputy chairman of Ang Mo Kio-Thye Hua Kwan Hospital a healthcare centre in Singapore for rehabilitative care.

=== Public career ===
Pillai's diplomatic career started with his assignment with the Government Parliamentary Committee on Defence and Foreign Affairs in the 1980s. In 1990, he was appointed as Singapore's Non-Resident Ambassador to Iran, a post he held until 2008. He later served as Singapore's High Commissioner to Pakistan. Pillai is a former Ambassador-at-Large at the Ministry of Foreign Affairs.

== Awards and recognitions ==
Pillai, a recipient of the Meritorious Award and Friend of Labour Award from National Trades Union Congress (NTUC) and Distinguished Alumni Award from the National University of Singapore, received the MCD Award from the Ministry of Community Development and Sports in 1998. In 1999, he received the Public Service Star Award. Singapore Computer Society conferred on him the Friend of IT Award in 2001 and the Singaporean government honoured Pillai, in 2009, with the National Day Award. The Indian government included him in the Republic Day honours list in 2012 for the civilian honour of Padma Shri.

In August 2022, he was conferred the Darjah Utama Bakti Cemerlang (Distinguished Service Order) by the Singapore government.

== Personal life ==
Pillai is married and the couple have four children.

== Bibliography ==
- Pillai, Gopinath (October 2013). The Political Economy of South Asian Diaspora: Patterns of Socio-Economic Influence. Palgrave Macmillan. ISBN 9781137285966.
