= Priyakant Maniyar =

Indian Gujarati-language poet (1927–1976)

- Born: 24 January 1927; Viramgam, British India
- Died: 25 June 1976 (aged 49); Ahmedabad, Gujarat, India
- Occupation: Poet
- Spouse: Ranjan (m. 1956)
- Writing career
- Language: Gujarati
- Notable works: Pratik (1953); Lilero Dhal (1979; posthumously)
- Notable awards: Kumar Suvarna Chandrak (1963); Uma-Snehrashmi Prize (1972–1973); Sahitya Akademi Award (1982)

Priyakant Premachand Maniyar (24 January 1927 – 25 June 1976) was a Gujarati poet from Gujarat, India. He published seven collections of symbolic and imagist poetry, and was awarded the Sahitya Akademi Award posthumously in 1982 for Lilero Dhal (1979), a collection of love songs about Radha and Krishna.

== Early life ==
Priyakant Maniyar was born to Premachand and Premakunwar in Viramgam (now in Gujarat, India) on 24 January 1927. His parents had migrated to Viramgam from Amreli for business. He was the second of five children. He started his primary school education at Mandal, where he studied until second grade, however he dropped out of New High School in Ahmedabad a few years later. Around this time he wrote his first poem, Pankhi ane Dano (Lit. Bird and Bird-seed), and submitted it for publication in Kumar magazine. Bachubhai Ravat, an editor of Kumar, suggested he join the Budh Sabha, a weekly literary workshop. Maniyar was a bangle-maker by profession.

== Works ==
Priyankant Maniyar is considered as one of the four major poets of the Niranjan school, a literary school named after poet Niranjan Bhagat. Other major poets of this school include Hasmukh Pathak and Nalin Raval.

Maniyar wrote symbolic and imagist poetry, and published seven collections of poems: Pratik (Sumbol; 1953), Ashabda Ratri (Silent Night; 1959), Sparsha (Touch; 1966), Sameep (Nearness; 1972), Prabal Gati (Powerful Speed; 1974), Vyom Lipi (Sky's Alphabet; 1979) and Lilero Dhal (Green Slope; 1979). His poems are composed in metrical, prosodic, orthometric and blank verses.

Lilero Dhal is a collection of love songs of Radha and Krishna. The book also contains songs that depict the beauty of nature, mountains, springs, clouds, and rainbows. The songs became very popular among poetry lovers, as they are melodious and composed in folk tunes.

== Awards ==
He received the Kumar Suvarna Chandrak award in 1963, and the Uma-Snehrashmi Prize (1972–1973). He received the Sahitya Akademi Award posthumously in 1982 for his poetry collection Lilero Dhal.

== Personal life ==
Maniyar married Ranjan in April 1956. They had two daughters, Jui and Gauri, born in 1959 and 1960, and one son, Nigam, born in 1963. Maniyar died on 25 June 1976 in Ahmedabad.

== See also ==
- List of Gujarati-language writers
