= Hariprasad Desai =

Indian independence activist

- Born: 20 November 1880; Godhra, British India (now in Panchmahal district, Gujarat, India)
- Died: 20 March 1950 (aged 69); Gujarat, India
- Occupations: Activist, social worker
- Parent: Vrajrai Desai (Father)

Hariprasad Vrajrai Desai (20 November 1880 – 31 March 1950) was an Indian independence activist, social worker and Gandhian from Gujarat, India. He was honored with the first Kumar Suvarna Chandrak (1944).

== Biography ==
"My innermost desire would be to join him with a spade, a broom, a chunam bucket and a brush."

— Gandhiji wrote in 1925, commending the work of Dr Hariprasad Desai, who was trying to clean up Ahmedabad.

Desai was born on 20 November 1880 in Godhra in Panchmahal district of Gujarat. He completed his primary education in Ahmedabad. He studied in B. J. Medical College, Ahmedabad and completed his LCPS (Licentiate of the College of Physicians & Surgeons) from the University of Calcutta in 1906. He started his medical practice at Sarangpur in Ahmedabad. He took an active part in Bang Bhang Andolan. He was the first person to invite and convince Gandhiji to settle down in Ahmedabad. He played an active role in an Indian independence movement, including the Home rule movement, and was jailed four times for his patriotic activities. The book 'Patriotic Soul', edited by him, awakened patriotism among the people. He worked for many years as the president of Daskroi Taluka Congress Committee, Ahmedabad City Congress Committee and Gujarat Provincial Congress Committee.

He was put in charge of the Kheda Satyagraha of 1918 in Mahemdavad taluka however the movement only reached five villages. This was due to the fact that Hariprasad Desai lived in Ahmedabad and travelled from the city to villages in a horse-carriage.

He was president of the Ahmedabad Municipality in 1930 and then chairman of its sanitary committee from 1931-34. He founded the Sanitary Association in Ahmedabad along with Dr. Kanuga and Dr. Benjamin. He had carefully cleaned the city of Ahmedabad seven times. He himself took a broom and cleaned the poles and removed tones of garbage. He served as a vice-president of Gujarat Sahitya Sabha from 1926-1929 and 1933-1950. He was also served as a vice-president of Gujarat Vidhya Sabha and dean of Lalit Kala department of Gujarat Vidyapith. He was a member of the Bombay Legislative Assembly in 1946. He was minister of Gokhale Society and Swadeshi Mitra Mandal From 1905 to 1918.

He wrote books such as 'Kalane Charne Charne', 'Ras Darshan', 'Jyare Nana Hata Tyare', 'Arogyan ni Vato', 'Jivan Sandesh', 'Papi ni Dasha', 'Vitamin ane Penicillin', 'Sahityane Charane'. and 'Hindna Acharyo'.

== Recognition ==
In 1944, Desai received the Kumar Suvarna Chandrak, a literary award given by Kumar Trust, Ahmedabad for his contribution in Kumar magazine published by Kumar Trust. He was the first person to get this award.
