= Rajnikumar Pandya =

Indian Gujarati-language writer

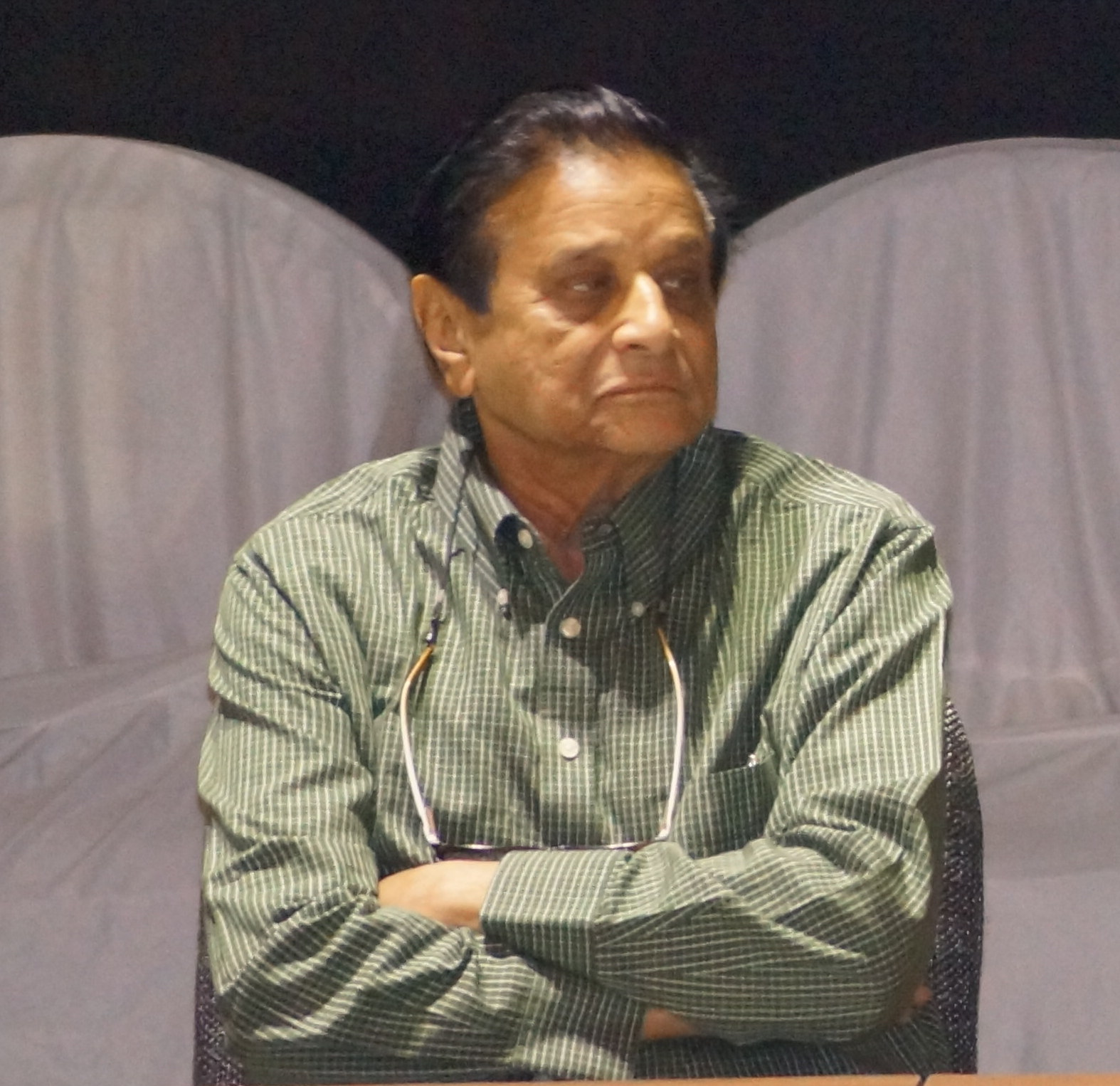
- Pandya in 2013
- Born: 6 July 1938; Jetpur, British India (now in Rajkot district, Gujarat, India)
- Died: 15 March 2025 (aged 86); Ahmedabad, Gujarat, India
- Occupations: Writer, journalist
- Writing career
- Genres: Short stories, novels, biographical essays, columns
- Notable works: Kunti, Pushpadaah, Koi Puchhe To Kahejo, Chandraadah, Parbhavna Pitarai
- Notable awards: Kumar Suvarna Chandrak (2003)

Rajnikumar Pandya (6 July 1938 – 15 March 2025) was an Indian Gujarati language writer and journalist from Gujarat. He was known for his short stories, novels, biographical essays, and columns. He had a significant contribution to Gujarati literature and journalism, particularly in the field of rural journalism. He was honored with numerous awards throughout his career, including the Kumar Suvarna Chandrak and awards from the Gujarat Sahitya Akademi and Gujarati Sahitya Parishad.

== Biography ==
Rajnikumar Pandya was born on 6 July 1938 in Jetpur, British India (now in the Rajkot district, Gujarat, India). His childhood was spent in Bilkha, where his father managed affairs on behalf of the minor ruler of the Bilkha State. He received his primary education in Bilkha, Charkha, Gopalgram, Dhasa, and Jetpur. His mother was educated, which fostered his early interest in reading and writing. Pandya obtained a B. Com degree from Gujarat University in 1959, followed by a B.A. degree from the same university in 1966. Professionally, he worked as a government auditor from 1959 to 1966 and as a bank manager from 1966 to 1989. He died in Ahmedabad on 15 March 2025 at the age of 86.

== Career ==
Pandya began his writing journey in 1959, with a special interest in short stories. His first collection of short stories, titled Khalel, was published in 1977. From 1980 onwards, he started writing columns, and his "Zabkar" series became very popular. Additionally, his articles published in daily newspapers under the title "Manbilori" and his line drawings titled "Gulmohar" were also well-received by readers. His collected "Zabkar" writings were published as Samagra Zabkar.

In 1985, he ventured into novel writing, and his notable novels, including Koi Puchhe To Kahejo, Chandraadah, Parbhavna Pitarai, and Kunti gained him fame. His novel Kunti was adapted into Hindi television series on national television. Other significant novels by him include Avatar and Pushpadaah. He also penned a biography titled Hans Prakash, based on the life of Hansraj Kalaria, a businessman from Malawi.

His literary works have been translated into several languages, including Hindi, Marathi, Tamil, and German. A book titled Rajni Kumar: Aapna Sauna was published in his honor during his sixtieth birthday celebration.

He had a deep appreciation for Hindi film music from the golden era (1940s to 1960s) and had personal connections with many artists. His book Aapki Parchhaiyaan, a collection of articles based on his interactions with these artists, was published in Gujarati in 1995 and later translated into Hindi and English as Intimate Impressions. He had a close bond with the poet Pradeep and even hosted the singer Jagmohan in his home for months. The music composer Anil Biswas also complimented Pandya on his singing voice.

He was known for his contributions to rural journalism. He received a special award from the state government for this work.

Pandya played a crucial role in the digitisation of Vismi Sadi, a Gujarati periodical that had ceased publication in 1920. He also developed a website digitising the Gujarati periodical Prakruti.

== Awards and recognitions ==
Rajnikumar Pandya received numerous awards and recognitions throughout his literary and journalistic career, including:

- Kumar Suvarna Chandrak in 2003
- Five awards from the Gujarat Sahitya Akademi
- Awards from the Gujarati Sahitya Parishad
- Saroj Pathak Award for short stories
- Dhumketu Award
- Gujarat Government's Special Award for Rural Journalism
- Statesman Award by Kolkata's Statesman newspaper
- Gujarat Government's Award in Best Journalism
- Two awards from the Dainik Akhbar Sangh
- Hari Om Ashram Award

== See also ==
- List of Gujarati-language writers
