= Kumar Suvarna Chandrak =

- Civilian award for contributions to literature
- Awarded for: Literary honor
- Sponsored by: Kumar Trust, Ahmedabad and Hiraben Foundation, Mumbai
- Location: Gujarat, India
- Formerly called: Kumar Chandrak (till 1983)
- First award: 1944
- Final award: 2015

Highlights
- Total awarded: 53
- First winner: Hariprasad Desai
- Last winner: Harshad Trivedi

Kumar Suvarana Chandrak or the Kumar Gold Medal is a literary award given by Kumar Trust, Ahmedabad, India since 1944. The medal is annually conferred to a Gujarati author for his contribution in Kumar magazine published by Kumar Trust. In 1950, Chandravadan Mehta refused to accept Kumar Chandrak.

== History ==
The medal was established in 1944, by Yashwant Pandya, an author contributing to Kumar. Initially, Gujarati authors Balwantray Thakore, Vishnuprasad Trivedi and Sundaram had served in a committee for the selection of awardee. Subsequently Ramnarayan V. Pathak and Anantrai Raval served on the committee. From 1983 to 2002, there is no expressed declaration of this medal, but from 2003 it has been started again. It was renamed from Kumar Chandrak (Kumar Medal) to Kumar Suvarna Chandrak (Kumar Gold Medal) in 2003.

== Recipients ==
Year	Recipients
1944	Hariprasad Desai
1945	Pushkar Chandarvakar
1946	Yashodhar Mehta
1947	Rajendra Shah
1948	Balmukund Dave
1949	Niranjan Bhagat
1950	Vasudev Bhatt
1951	Bakul Tripathi
1952	Shivkumar Joshi
1953	Ashok Harsh
1954	Shivprasad Trivedi
1955	Umakant Shah
1956	Chandravadan A. Buch
1957	Jayant Pathak
1958	Hemant Desai
1959	Ushnas
1960	Navneet Parekh
1961	Sunil Kothari
1962	Labhshankar Thakar
1963	Priyakant Maniar
1964	Chandrakant Sheth
1965	Raghuveer Chaudhari
1966	Father Vallés
1967	Harikrishna Pathak
1968	Gulabdas Broker
1969	Bhanuprasad Pandya
1970	Ramesh Parekh
1971	Dhiru Parikh
1972	Madhusudan Parekh
1973	Kanubhai Jani
1974	Madhusudan Dhaky
1975	Hariprasad Shastri
1976	Vinod Bhatt
1977	Bhagwatikumar Sharma
1978	Ashvin R. Desai
1979	Shankardev Vidyalankar
1980	Bahadurshah Pandit
1981	Hasmukh Baradi
1982	Praful Raval
1983	Chandrashankar Bhatt 'Shashishivam'
2003	Rajnikumar Pandya
2004	Ramchandra Patel
2005	Bahadurbhai Vank
2006	Priti Sengupta
2007	Sushrut Patel
2008	Bhagirath Brahmbhatt
2009	Parantap Pathak
2010	Rajesh Vyas 'Miskin'
2011	Pravin Darji
2012	Radheshyam Sharma
2013	Yoseph Macwan
2014	Harsh Brahmbhatt
2015	Harshad Trivedi
2016	Bharat Dave
