= Kavilok =

Gujarati language bimonthly poetry journal

Kavilok Magazine
- coverpage of Kavilok; January - February 2016 Issue
- Editor in chief: Dhiru Parikh
- Co-editor: Praful Raval
- Former editors: Rajendra Shah; Jashubhai Shah; Suresh Dalal; Priyakant Maniar; Jayant Parekh; Niranjan Bhagat; Ashok Chavda
- Categories: Literature
- Frequency: Bimonthly
- Format: Print
- Publisher: Kavilok Trust
- Founder: Rajendra Shah
- Founded: 1957
- Country: India
- Based in: Ahmedabad
- Language: Gujarati

Kavilok (Gujarati: કવિલોક), a publication of Kavilok Trust, is a Gujarati language bimonthly poetry journal published in Ahmedabad, Gujarat, India. The current editor is Dhiru Parikh and co-editor is Praful Raval.

== History ==
The Kavilok poetry journal was founded by Rajendra Shah in 1957. The first issue of the journal was published in Mumbai in crown size under the editorship of Rajendra Shah, Suresh Dalal and Jashubhai Shah. From the 32nd issue, Jayant Parekh replaced Jashubhai Shah as an editor. From the 37th to the 66th issue, Priyakant Maniar served as editor with Jayant Parekh. In January 1970, the 73rd issue was published in Ahmedabad in foolscap size. The editors were Bachubhai Ravat and Rajendra Shah. After the journal moved to Ahmedabad, Niranjan Bhagat also served as an editor for approximately one year. Since 1977, the journal has been edited by Dhiru Parikh. From 2004 to 2006, Ashok Chavda served as a co-editor. Praful Raval is currently co-editor of the journal.

== Content ==
The journal publishes poetry, translations of world poetry, reviews and criticisms of poetry, and biographical articles about poets.

== Special issues ==
- Mahakavya Visheshank (1982; Translation and discussion of major epics of the world)
- Panchmahakavya Visheshank (1983; Criticism of Sanskrit epics)
- Gadyakavya Visheshank (1984; Discussion of prose poems of Gujarati literature and World literature)
- T.S Eliot Visheshank (1988; Poet T.S Eliot)

== See also ==
- List of Gujarati-language magazines
