= Bachubhai Ravat =

Indian editor and art critic

- Born: Bachubhai Popatbhai Ravat; 27 February 1898; Ahmedabad, Gujarat, India
- Died: 12 July 1980 (aged 82)
- Occupations: editor and art critic
- Writing career
- Language: Gujarati
- Notable awards: Ranjitram Suvarna Chandrak (1948); Padma Shri (1975)

Bachubhai Popatbhai Ravat (27 February 1898 – 12 July 1980) was a Gujarati editor and art critic from India.

== Life ==
Bachubhai Ravat was born on 27 February 1898 in Ahmedabad. He completed his primary and secondary education from Gondal. He also matriculated from there in 1914. He taught at Sangramji High School in Gondal from 1915 to 1919. He worked at Sastu Sahityavardhak Karyalaya from 1920 to 1921. He worked in editing and publishing department of Navjeevan Prakashan Mandir in 1922–1923. He co-edited Kumar magazine with Ravishankar Raval from 1924 to 1942. He founded weekly literary workshop, Budh Sabha, in 1930 which still continues. He later served as an editor of Kumar from 1943 to 1980. He served on Bombay State Script Reform Committee in 1953. He was appointed a member of Legislative Assembly of Bombay State in 1954 where he served for six years. He was the president of the first Gujarati Printer's Conference. He was also the president of journalism department of 23rd annual conference of Gujarati Sahitya Parishad held in Surat in 1965. He died on 12 July 1980.

== Works ==
His work of literary editing and journalism, especially in Kumar, contributed heavily in literary development in Gandhi era of Gujarati literature. He was an insistent of metrical poems and used to say that "there could be no poem without metre". Gujarati Granthasth Chitrakala is collection of essays on art and art criticism. He also wrote Gujarati Lipina Nava Parodhnu Nirman on Gujarati script. Tunki Vartao (1921) is collection of short stories translated from Hindi.

== Awards ==
He was awarded Ranjitram Suvarna Chandrak for his contribution in field of journalism in 1948. In 1975, he was awarded Padma Shri, the fourth highest civilian award of India.

== See also ==
- List of Gujarati-language writers
