= Dhiru Parikh =

Gujarati poet and critic (1933–2021)

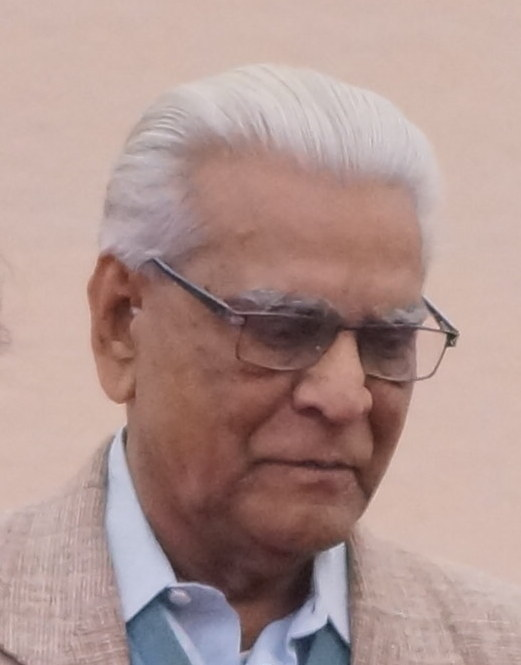
- Parikh in 2013
- Born: Dhiru Ishwarlal Parikh; 31 August 1933; Viramgam, Bombay Presidency, British India
- Died: 9 May 2021 (aged 87); Ahmedabad, Gujarat, India
- Occupations: poet, critic, story writer
- Spouse: Kamla Parikh (m. 1964)
- Writing career
- Language: Gujarati
- Notable awards: Kumar Chandrak (1971); Ranjitram Suvarna Chandrak (2008)
- Dhiru Parikh's voice Speech on 'Town and Town Poetry'

Academic work
- Doctoral students: Praful Raval

Signature
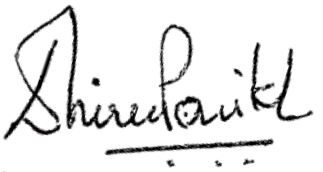

Dhiru Ishwarlal Parikh (31 August 1933 – 9 May 2021) was an Indian Gujarati poet, short story writer and critic. He was an editor of Kavilok and Kumar, Gujarati literary magazines.

== Biography ==
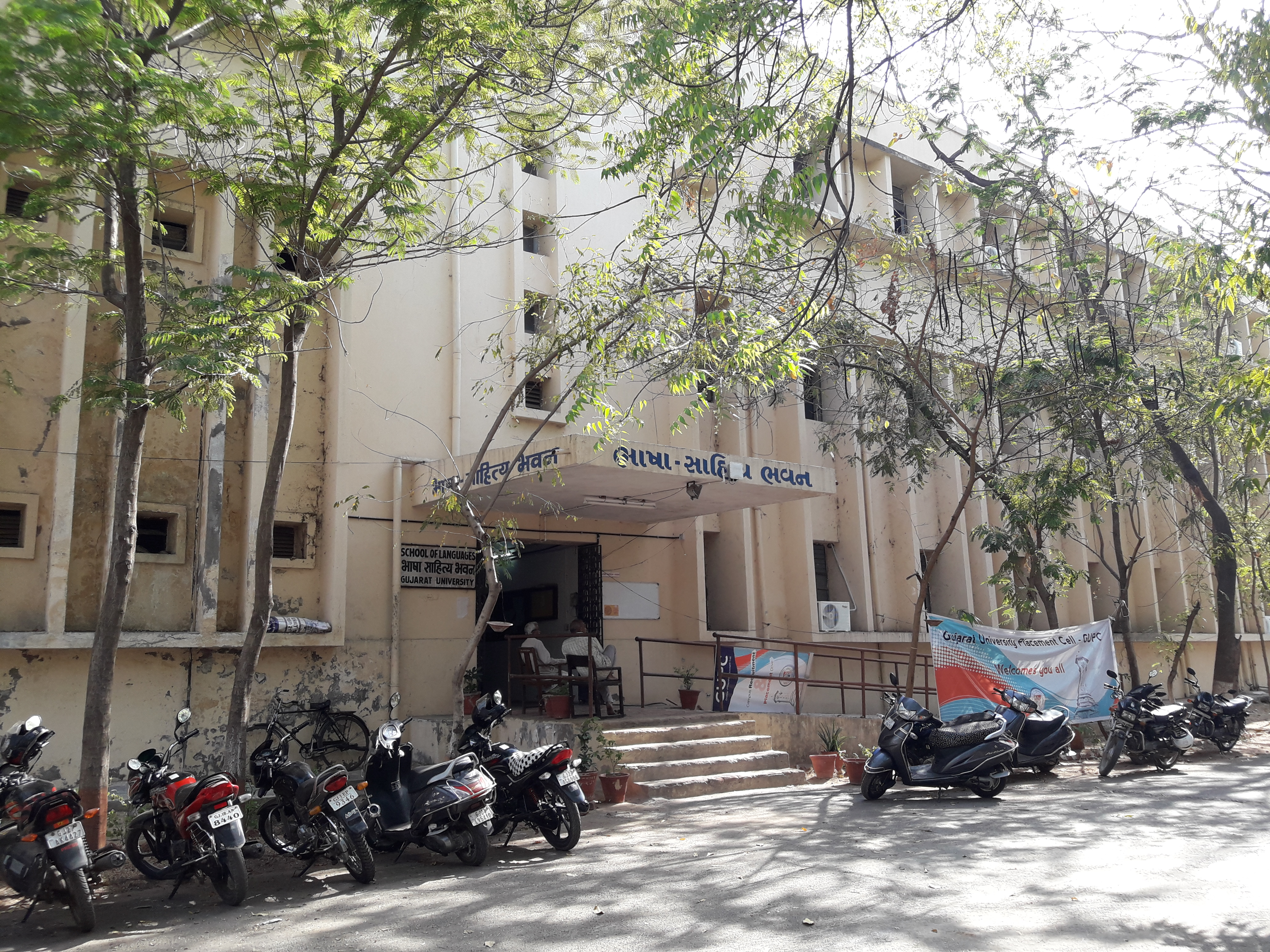
The School of Languages where Parikh served as professor and head of Gujarati department

Dhiru Parikh was born on 31 August 1933 at Viramgam near Ahmedabad, Gujarat, India. He completed his matriculation in 1951 from the town. He completed B.A. in 1955 from L. D. Arts College, M.A. in 1958 from Gujarat University and was awarded Ph.D. in 1967 for his thesis, Rasyugma Prakruti Nirupan. Since 1955, he taught at C. U. Shah College. He served as the principal of Mahila Arts College of Wadhwan affiliated with SNDT Women's University from 1967 to 1969. Later he joined as a professor of Department of Gujarati, School of Languages, Gujarat University in 1977, served as a head from 1986 to his retirement in 1993. He edited bimonthly, Kavilok of Gujarati poetry, since 1976 which he joined in 1969 as co-editor. He served as president of Gujarati Sahitya Parishad from December 2013 to December 2014. He also edited Kumar since 1991.

He married Kamla Parikh (née Patel) in 1964. He died on 9 May 2021, in Ahmedabad.

== Works ==
His first work published in 1951 was a short story titled Pehlu Rudan. His short story collection Kantakni Khushbo (1964) has twenty two stories. His other story collection is Parajit Vijay. Ughad (1979) is a collection of poetry. Ang Pachisi (1982) is a collection of twenty five traditional Chhappa styled sarcastic poems. Aagiya (1982) is a collection of haiku. His other poetry collections are Hari Chadya Adfete, Shikhare Betha Chhe Sthitipragnya (2003), Station ane Train (2007).

He wrote biography of Rajendra Shah under Gujarati Granthkar Shreni and published in 1977. Rasyug ma Prakritinirupan (Nature in medieval literature of Raas, 1978) is his research thesis. Atratya Tatratya (1978) is a collection of introductory essays on poets which include Gujarati poets along with C. K. Louis, W. H. Auden, Pablo Neruda, Eugenio Montale and Yevgeny Yevtushenko. Narsinh Mehta (1981) is a biography of Narsinh Mehta. Kharakshar (1982) has short introduction of several Gujarati authors including Dayaram, Dalpatram, Narmad, Priyakant Maniyar, Jagdish Joshi, Manilal Desai. Kaalma Korya Naam (1977) is a collection of short biographies including Yasunari Kawabata, Ishwar Chandra Vidyasagar, Charles Dickens, Dalpatram, Pujya Mota.

Samkalin Kavio (1983) is criticism of poetry of contemporary poets including Labhshankar Thakar, Sitanshu Yashaschandra, Rajendra Shukla, Ravji Patel, Adil Mansuri. Paravartan (1985), Prayogshil Sarjak Nhanalal (1987), Amar Brahmana Alokma, Ubhayanvaya (1986) are works of criticism. He edited several books, Nishkulanand Padavali (1981), Saar Mahakavyo (1983), Panch Mahakavyo (1984) and T. S. Eliot (1989). Tulnatmak Sahitya (1984) is a work on comparative literature. He translated Divine Comedy in 1985.

== Awards ==
He was awarded Kumar Chandrak in 1971, Swami Sachchidanand Sanman in 2004, Premanand Suvarna Chandrak in 2006 and Ranjitram Suvarna Chandrak in 2008.

== See also ==
- List of Gujarati-language writers
