= Bholabhai Patel =

Indian Gujarati author (1934–2012)

- Born: 7 August 1934; Soja village, Mehsana district, Gujarat, India
- Died: 20 May 2012 (aged 77); Ahmedabad, Gujarat
- Occupation: Author
- Writing career
- Language: Gujarati
- Notable awards: Padma Shri (2008)

Academic background
- Thesis: Agney: Ek Adhyayan Adhunikta Avam Pashyat Prabhavoke Vishesh Sandharbh Me
- Doctoral advisor: Ambashankar Nagar

Academic work
- Doctoral students: Bindu Bhatt

Signature
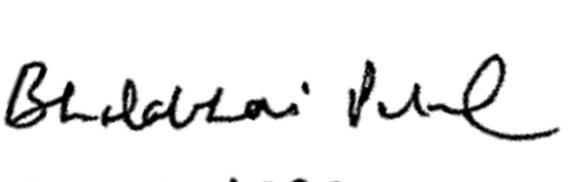

Bholabhai Patel (pronounced [bʰo.ɭa.bʰa.i pə.ʈel]) was an Indian Gujarati author. He taught numerous languages at Gujarat University and did comparative studies of literature in different languages. He translated extensively and wrote essays and travelogues. He was awarded the Padma Shri in 2008.

== Life ==
Patel was born on 7 August 1934, in Soja village near Gandhinagar, Gujarat. He completed S.S.C. in 1952. He earned a Bachelor's degree in Sanskrit, Hindi and Indian culture from Banaras Hindu University in 1957. He also studied at the Gujarat University, and completed his master's degree in Hindi in 1960, a Bachelors in English in 1968, a Masters in English and Science of Language in 1970. From 1974, he started working on his PhD thesis on Sachchidananda Vatsyayan 'Agyeya', a modernist Hindi writer, and completed it in 1977. The thesis was later published as Agyeya: Ek Adhyayan in Hindi. During his studies in Gujarathi University, Gujarathi writer Umashankar Joshi was his Gujarati lecturer. Joshi influenced literary taste and critical discrimination. He also completed a diploma in German in 1971 and linguistics in 1974. Patel obtained a fellowship from the Visva-Bharati University where he did a comparative study of Indian literature.

Patel was married and had three children. He began his teaching career working at a primary school in Modasa. He taught at Saradar Vallabhbhai Arts College in Ahmedabad from 1960 to 1969. Later he taught and headed the Hindi Department of the School of Languages at Gujarat University from 1969 until his retirement in 1994. Patel served as a fellow of comparative literature at Visva-Bharati University, Santiniketan in 1983-84 and at the Institute of Humanities, Vidya Bhavan. He was also the trustee of the institute which published Gujarati Vishwakosh, the Gujarati encyclopaedia. He served as the president of the Gujarati Sahitya Parishad from 2011 until his death in 2012. He edited Parab, a monthly of Gujarati Sahitya Parishad for three decades starting 1974.

He died on 20 May 2012 at Ahmedabad following a heart attack.

== Works ==
Patel had published more than 52 books. He was a polyglot who spoke Gujarati, Hindi, Bengali, Assamese, Oriya, German, French, Marathi, Puria and Sanskrit fluently. He translated many books from these languages to Gujarati and vice versa. He wrote literary travelogues about his travels across Europe and the US. Patel was an expert on the works of the ancient poet Kalidas and the Nobel laureate Rabindranath Tagore.

=== Non-fiction ===
Vidisha (1980) is collection of his eleven travel essays. Purvottar (1971) is travelogue of his travel in Northeast India, West Bengal and Odisha. Kanchanjangha (1985) is collection of travel essays. His other two collections are Bole Zina Mor (1992) and Shalbhanjika (1992). His other travelogues are Radhe Tara Dungariya Par (1987), Devoni Ghati (1989), Devatma Himalaya (1990) and Europe-Anubhav (2004).

His works of criticism are Adhuna (1973), Bharatiya Tunkivarta (1987), Purvapar (1976), Kalpurush (1979), Adhunikata ane Gujarati Kavita (1987), Sahityik Paramparano Vistar (1996), Aav Gira Gujarati (2003).

=== Edited and translated works ===
He has edited some works; Asamiya Gujarati Kavita (1981), Gujarati Sahityano Athmo Dayko (1982), Gujarati Sahityano Navmo Dayko (with Chandrakant Topiwala, 1991) and Jeevannu Kavya (1987), selected works of Kaka Kalelkar. His Ph.D. thesis, Agney: Ek Adhyayan was published by Gujarat University in 1983.

As he was a polyglot, he translated large number of works. A large number of these translations were from Bengali to his native Gujarati, such as Sukumar Sen's history of Bengali literature, Bangali Sahitya Itihasni Rooprekha in 1982. Other translations from Bengali include works by Rabindranath Tagore, such as Char Adhyay (1988), Jibanananda Das's poetry collection Vanlata Sen (1976), Sunil Gangopadhyay's novel Swargani Niche Manushya (1977), Buddhadeb Bosu's play Tapaswi ane Tarangini (1982).

He also translated Vinayak Athwale's Vishnu Digambar (1967), Gopal Singh's Guru Nanak (1969), Maheswar Neog's Shankardev (1970), He translated Sumitranandan Pant's poetry collection in Gujarati as Chidambara (1969) with Raghuveer Chaudhari. He translated Umashankar Joshi's poetry books Prachina (1968) and Nishith (1968) in Hindi. Rabindranath Tagore's Geet Panchshati (1978) was translated in Gujarati by him, Nagindas Parekh and others. He also translated Prabhudutt Brahmachari's Chaitanya Mahaprabhu (1986) with Nagindas Parekh. He translated Hindi writer Shrikant Verma's Bijana Pag (1990) with Bindu Bhatt. He translated R. M. Lala's The Creation of Wealth from English in Gujarati as Sampattinu Sarjan (1984). Kamroopa is translation of selected Assamese poetry. He also translated Syed Abdul Malik's novel as Soorajmukhina Swapna and Vasudev Sharan Agrawal's studies as Harshacharit: Ek Sanskritik Adhyayan. He translated Agyeya's Hindi work Angan Ke Par Dwar into Gujarati as Anganani Par Dwar (2002).

== Recognition ==
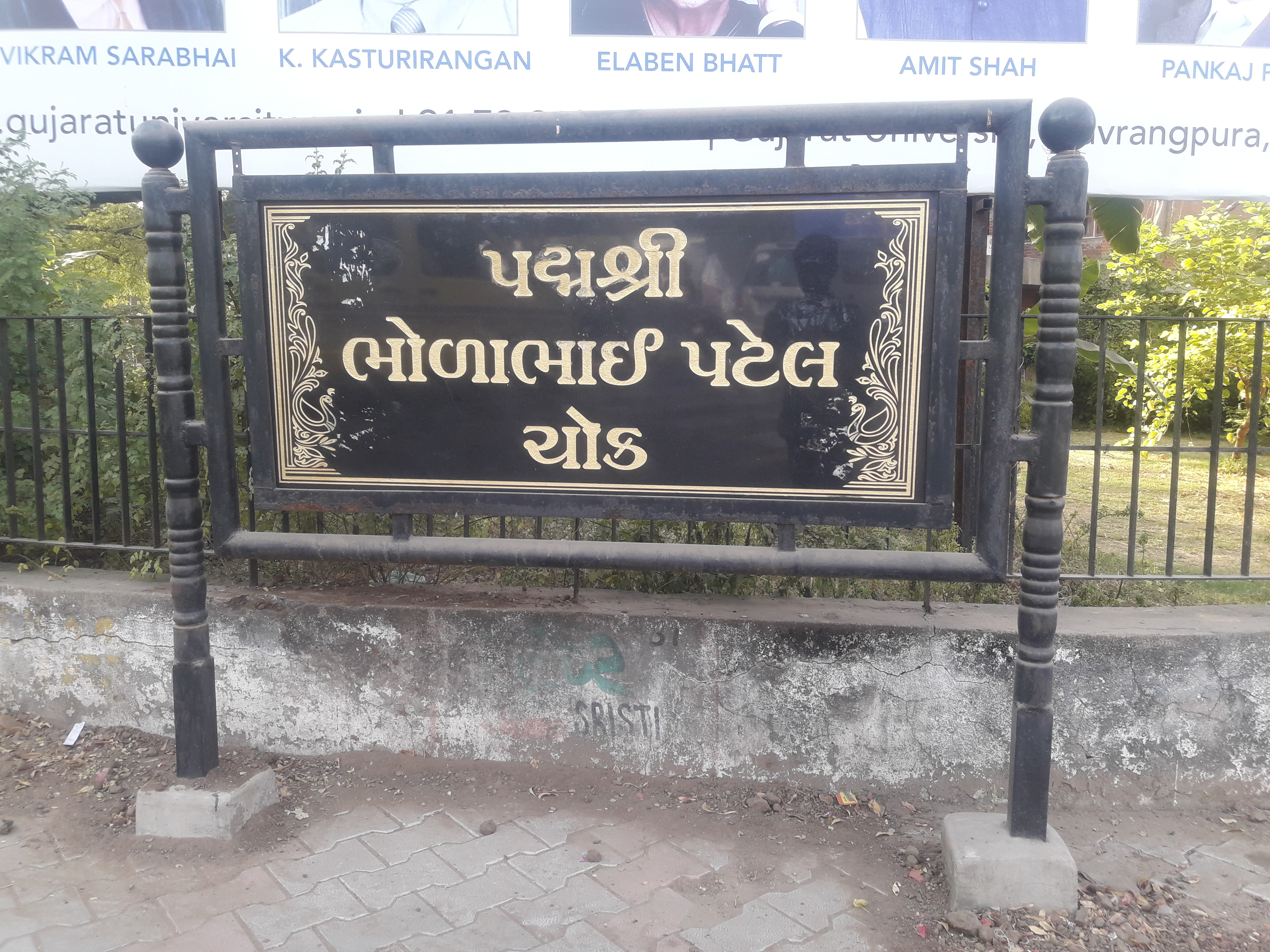
Padmashri Bholabhai Patel Circle named after him on University Road, Ahmedabad

Patel was awarded the Padma Shri, the fourth highest civilian award in India, in 2008. He also won the KK Birla Foundation fellowship. He received the Ranjitram Suvarna Chandrak in 1995, the highest award in Gujarati literature. He was the recipient of the Sahitya Akademi Award for Gujarati in 1992 for Devoni Ghati. Bholabhai Patel Chowk, a crossroad near Gujarat University, is named after him.

== See also ==
- List of Gujarati-language writers
