= Ramchandra Patel =

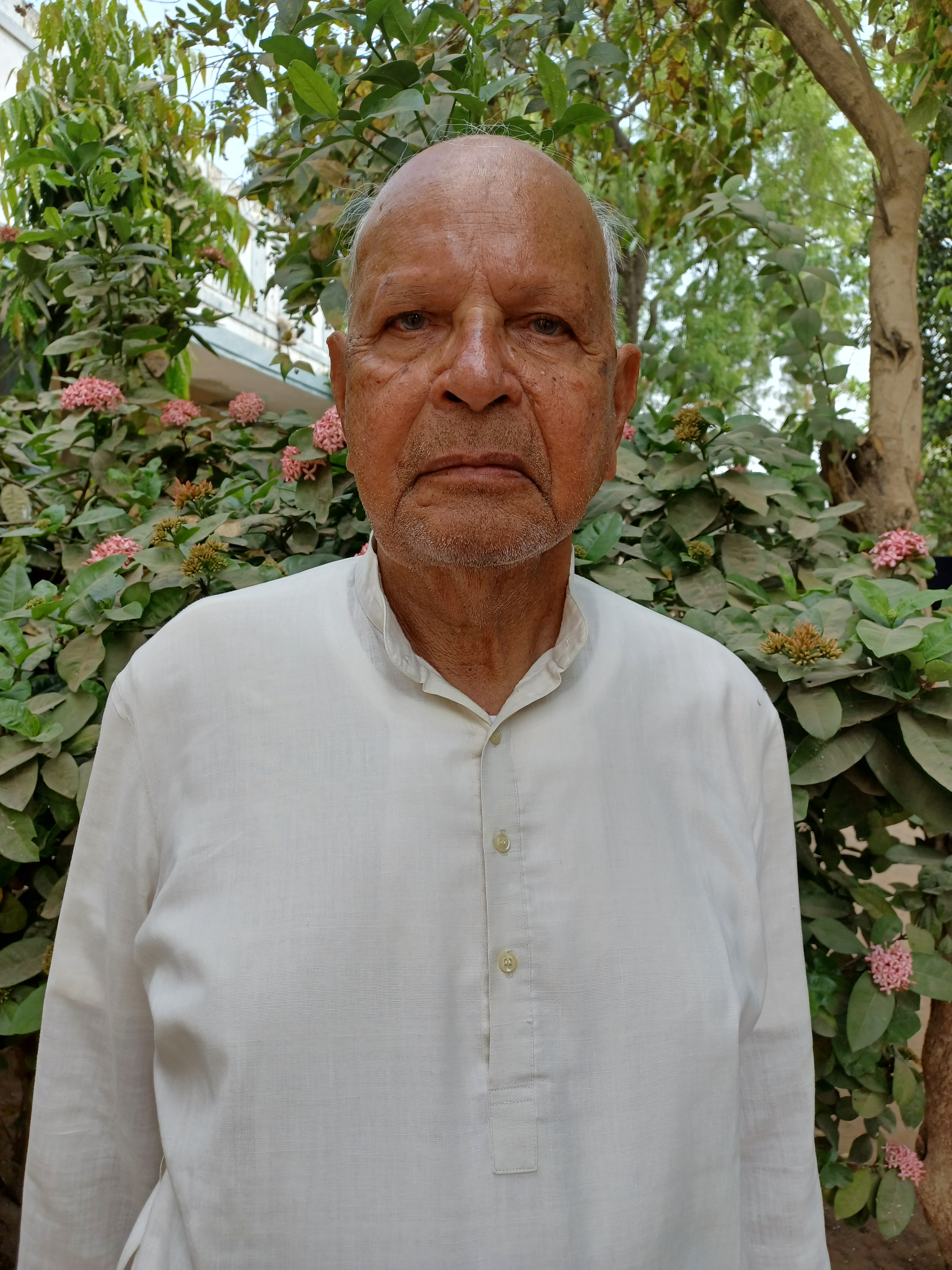
- Patel at Anera, near Himatnagar, Gujarat, India in March 2022
- Born: Ramchandra Babaldas Patel; 1 August 1939 (age 87); Umta, (now in Mehsana district, Gujarat)
- Education: S. S. C.
- Occupations: Poet, novelist and short story writer
- Writing career
- Language: Gujarati
- Notable awards: Kumar Suvarna Chandrak (2004)

Ramchandra Babaldas Patel (born 1 August 1939), also known by his pen name Sukrit, is a Gujarati poet, novelist and short story writer from Gujarat, India.

== Life ==
Ramchandra Patel was born on 1 August 1939 at Umta village (now in Mehsana district, Gujarat). He completed his primary and secondary education from Umta and Visnagar. After completing S. S. C., he joined Sheth C. N. College of Fine Arts, Ahmedabad and received D. T. C. He returned to Umta and joined High School as a drawing teacher. He retired from there after serving for 38 years. He was involved in discovery of medieval Jain temple in Rajgadhi mound in his village. He works in agriculture, education and social service.

== Works ==
Patel's writing is influenced by his rural life and close contact with nature and agriculture. He has published two poetry collections, Mari Anagasi Rutu (1977) and Padmanidra (2001), containing metrical and non-metrical poetry. His love of nature and agriculture is evident in his poems. Simantara (2013) contains 81 poems.

He has written several novels. Ek Soneri Nadi (1978) depicts companionship of Suryadev and Rannade amid nature. Prithvini Ek Bari (1985) is its sequel. Varal (1979) is a story of a protagonist fighting against famine. It also explores the theme of oppressed people. Swargno Agni's (1981) protagonist becomes Kalki to save humanity through violence. In Amritkumbh (1982), the protagonist is fighting his own desires. In Chiryatri (1986), a person remembers his past in a village destroyed by desertification which he had left a long time ago. His other novels include: Rajgadhi (1996), Meruyagna (1998), Angarak (1999), Sonageru (2004), Aranyadwar (2006).

Sthalantar (1996) and Ek Bagalthelo (1998) are his short story collections about migration and its psychological impact. Agiyar Dera (2012) is story collection set in rural environment. Adadho Sooraj Suko, Adadho Leelo (2000) is collection of essays on nature. He has edited Hu Khadamanthi Bahar (1972).

== Awards ==
He was awarded the Kumar Suvarna Chandrak in 2004. He has also received prizes from the Gujarati Sahitya Parishad and the Gujarat Sahitya Akademi.

== See also ==
- List of Gujarati-language writers
