= R. M. Lala =

Indian writer (1928–2012)

Russi M. Lala (22 August 1928 – 19 October 2012) was an Indian author, editor, and publisher known for his chronicles of the Tatas. When he was 19, he entered the profession of book publishing in 1951. From 1959 to 1963, he established the first publishing house from India in London, 1959.

== Family and education ==
Russi M. Lala, graduated with History Honours from Bombay University. Journalism was his passion from his childhood. In his 'early years', he was fond of his father, Maneckshaw P. Lala, from whom he acquired an abiding love for literature. "The urge for expression marks the beginning of writing" says Mr Lala in his autobiography.[1] It was this urge that made him write letters to newspapers during his teens – about topics ranging from cruelty to animals, to Gandhi, and Roosevelt.

== Biography ==
Russi M.Lala joined the Tata group in 1974, and he retired in 2003 as director of the Sir Dorabji Tata Trust. During his association with the Tata group he authored a number of books celebrating the Tata heritage. R.M.Lala's books have been translated into other languages, including Japanese.

== Turning point ==
Heading the first Indian book publishing house in London was a turning point for Mr. Lala. It was here that he got a deeper understanding of Moral Re-Armament (MRA), subsequently renamed as Initiatives of Change, besides life and human nature. The discipline of an early morning 'quiet time' that the author calls 'the secret of life' was shaped during this period. Editor of the journal 'Himmat Weekly', was co founded with Rajmohan Gandhi by Russi in 1964, and managed it successfully for the next decade.

== Positions held in Tata's ==
- Russi Lala was also the Director of Tata's premier Foundation,
- The Sir Dorabji Tata Trust for 18 years.
- Co-founder of the Centre for Advancement of Philanthropy. (CAP) Since 1993, he has been its Chairman.
- CAP, was founded to enable people to build trusts for any specific purpose of their choice. It gives free consultancy services to NGOs regarding registration, taxexemptions, finance and management. It also makes periodic representations to government on behalf of the philanthropic sector.[4]
- CAP has played a facilitative role in introducing, for the first time in India, a 'Certificate Programm in Resource Mobilization & Management (CPRMM)' at the S.P. Jain Institute of Management Studies. Technical input for this one-year course is being provided by the U.K.-based 'Resource Alliance', of which the Chief Executive of CAP, Mr. Dadrawala was earlier a board member.[5]

=== Severe health problems ===
The author's faith and purpose have seen him weather severe challenges to health. Cancer of the lymph nodes was first detected in 1989. He had to undergo chemotherapy, which he refers to as one of the most violent forms of treatment. "It is essential to recognize that life is larger than cancer" Lala states in his autobiography, adding that to confront any crisis, "we have to marshal our inner resources of strength." Some of his most creative works have come after his epic battle with cancer. The updated version of "The Creation of Wealth" was followed by Jamsetji Tata's biography "For the Love of India". Within six weeks of bypass surgery "In Search of Ethical Leadership" was launched. "Celebration of the Cells" is a detailed account by R.M.Lala written in the form of letters to prepare a friend who is also diagnosed with cancer. A free copy of e-book of "Celebration of the Cells" is available on Mr Lala's own website.[2]

== Books by R.M. Lala ==
- The Creation of Wealth - The Tatas from the 19th to 21st century; 1st published in 1981; was a bestseller, ISBN 978-0-14-306224-0
- The Heartbeat of a Trust - The story of the Sir Dorabji Tata Trust; 1st published in 1984; ISBN 0-07-463246-9
- In Search of Ethical Leadership - Includes Business Ethics of J.R.D. Tata; 1st published in 1986; ISBN 978-81-7094-631-1
- Beyond the Last Blue Mountain - A Life of J.R.D. Tata; 1st published in 1992 was a bestseller; ISBN 978-0-14-016901-0
- The Joy of Achievement - Conversations with J.R.D. Tata; 1st published in 1995; ISBN 978-0-14-025064-0
- Celebrations of the Cells - Letters from a Cancer Survivor; 1st published in 1999; ISBN 0-670-88561-4
- A Touch of Greatness - Encounters with the Eminent; 1st published in 2001; ISBN 9780141005195
- For the Love of India - The Life and Times of Jamsetji; 1st published in 2004; ISBN 978-0-14-306206-6
- The Romance of Tata Steel; 1st published in 2007; ISBN 9780670081462
- The Thread of God in my Life - An autobiography with a difference; 1st published in 2009; ISBN 978-0-670-08268-1
- Finding a purpose in life - 26 People Who Inspired the World; 1st published in 2009; ISBN 978-81-7223-856-8
- Widening the Circle - The Art of Effective Giving; 1st published in 2011; ISBN 978-93-5029-172-6

== Post-retirement ==
Post retirement R.M.Lala has been involved in giving talks on the role of purpose in life, leadership, and cancer. He has been associated with Moral Re-Armament, an organisation based in Panchgani. He is also on the board for Bombay Community Public Trust and MS Swaminathan Research Foundation.[3]
