= Pujya Mota =

Spitual leader from India (1898–1976)

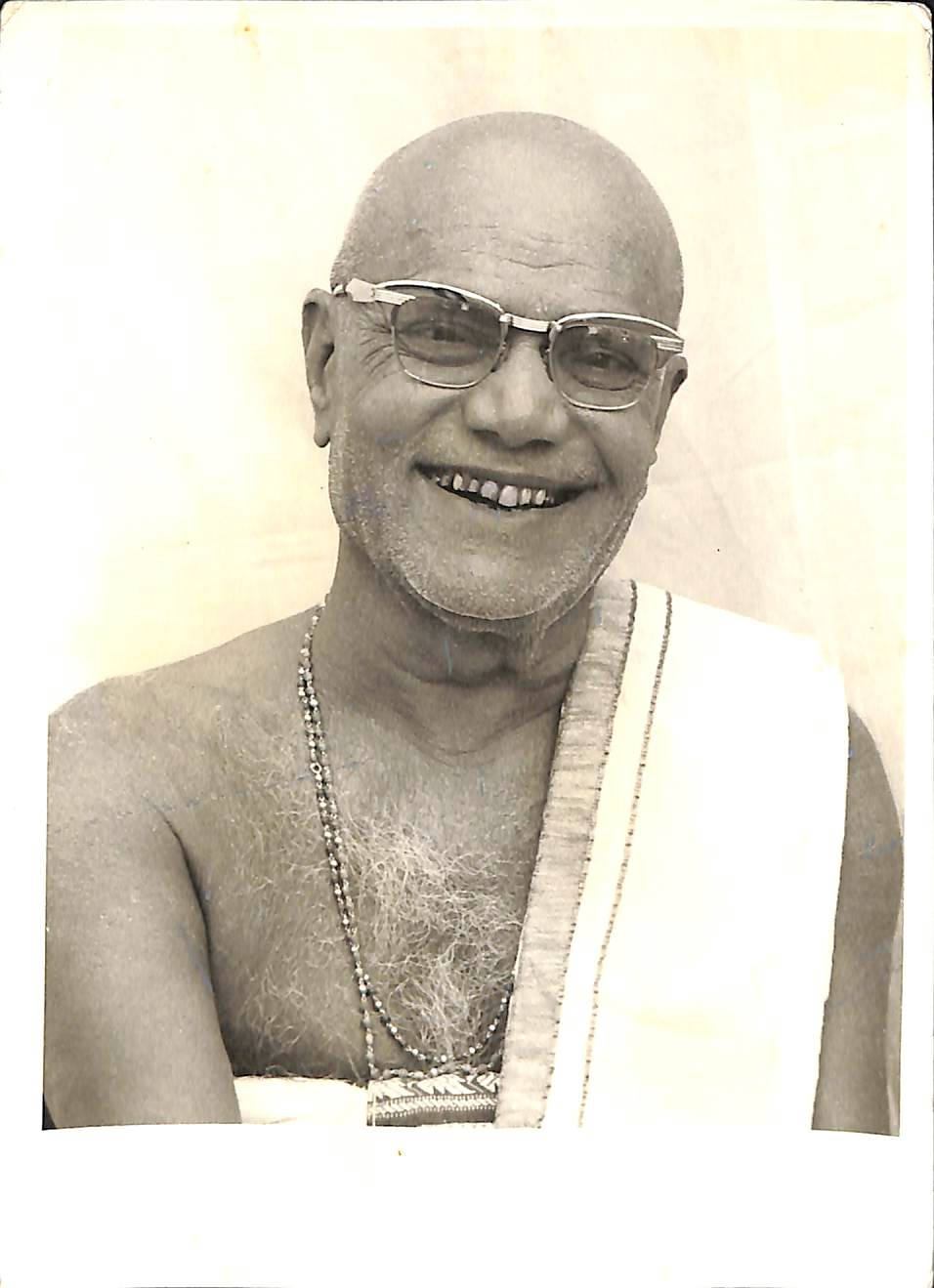
Pujya Mota

Pujya Shree Mota (4 September 1898 – 23 July 1976), or Chunilal Asharam Bhavsar, was a spiritual leader who established ashrams in Nadiad and Surat in Gujarat, India. He founded the Hari Om Ashram, also known as the Maun Mandir, near Nadiad & Surat.
