= Bindu Bhatt =

Gujarati language novelist, storywriter, critic and translator

- બિંદુ ગીરધરલાલ ભટ્ટ
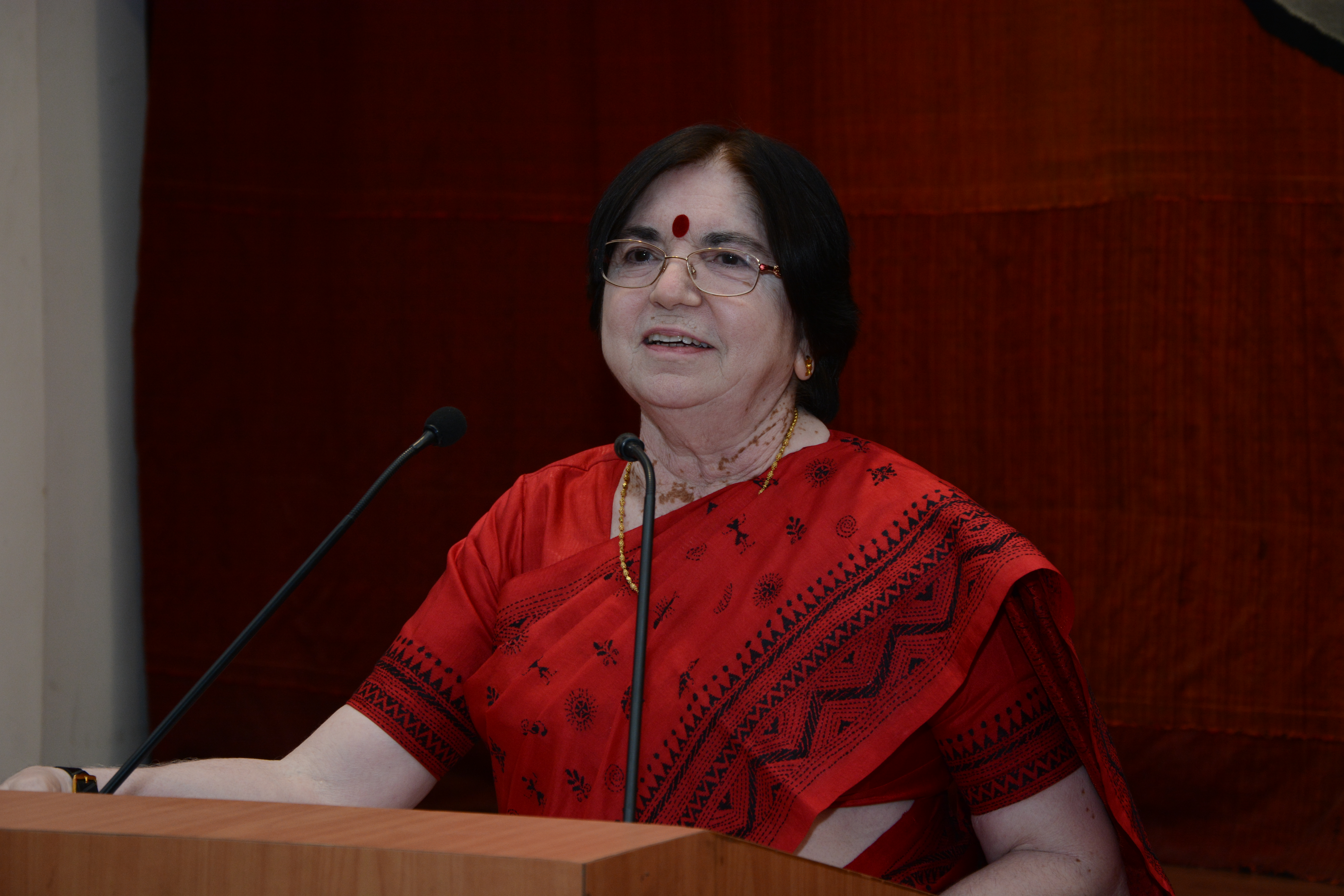
- Bindu Bhatt in April 2018 at Gujarat Vishwakosh Trust
- Born: Bindu Giradharlal Bhatt; 18 September 1954 (age 71); Jodhpur, Rajasthan, India
- Education: Master of Arts; Ph.D.
- Alma mater: Gujarat University
- Occupations: Storywriter, Novelist, Critic and Translator
- Spouse: Harshad Trivedi (1991 - present)
- Children: Jayjit Trivedi
- Writing career
- Language: Gujarati, Hindi
- Period: Postmodern Gujarati literature
- Genres: Short Story, Novel
- Notable works: Mira Yagnikni Diary (1992); Akhepatar (1999)
- Notable awards: Sahitya Akademi Award (2003)

Academic background
- Thesis: Modern Hindi Novel: New Facets of Fiction and Form
- Doctoral advisor: Bholabhai Patel

Bindu Bhat (born 18 September 1954) is a Gujarati language novelist, storywriter, critic and translator from Gujarat, India. Her novel Akhepatar (1999) received the Sahitya Akademi Award for the year 2003. Her other significant works include Mira Yagnikni Dayari (1992) and Bandhani (2009).

== Early life ==
Bindu Bhatt was born on 18 September 1954 in Jodhpur, Rajasthan to Giradharlal and Kamalabahen. Her family later migrated to Limbadi and then Ahmedabad. After completing her schooling from B.A. Kanya Vidyalay, Limbadi, she got her Bachelor of Arts in 1976 from H.K. Arts College, Ahmedabad and Master of Arts in 1978 from School of Language, Gujarat University with Hindi literature as one of her subjects. She obtained her Ph.D. degree under Bholabhai Patel from the same university in 1983 for her research work Aadhunik Hindi Upanyas: Kathya Aur Shilp Ke Naye Aayam (Modern Hindi Novel: New Facets of Fiction and Form). In 1991, she married Harshad Trivedi, a Gujarati author and poet.

== Career ==
She started her career as a lecturer and subsequently started to write in Gujarati and Hindi language. She taught Hindi Literature at M.P. Shah Arts and Science College, Surendranagar for six years. She joined Uma Arts And Nathiba Commerce Mahila College, Gandhinagar in 1991 and is still working there as an associate professor and head of its Department of Hindi.

== Works ==
Her first novel, Mira Yagnikni Dayari, was published in 1992 which is related to the lesbian relationship between two women. It is also translated in Sindhi and the translation is awarded by Sahitya Akademi, New Delhi. Her second novel, Akhepatar, was published in (1999) which has been translated in several languages, including Hindi, Sindhi, Marathi, Kachcchhi, Rajasthani and English. It was translated in English by Vinod Meghani. Bindu Bhatt debuted in short story genre with her book Bandhani (2009). She also translated several works into Hindi from Gujarati including Harivallabh Bhayani's Aapabransh Vyakaran, Dhiruben Patel's Andhali Gali and Jayant Gadit's Satya (in 4 parts; with Virendra Narayan Sinh). She has also given translation from Hindi to Gujarati including Fanishwarnath Renu (Monograph by Surendra Chaudhari), Dadu Dayal (Monograph by Raam Baqsh) and Bija Na Pag (short stories by Shreekant Varma).

=== Criticism ===
- Adyatan Hindi Upnyaas (1993)
- Aaj ke Rangnatak (1998)

=== Editing ===
- Gurjar Pravas Nibandh Sanchay (co-edited with Raghuveer Chaudhari)
- Asmita Parv Vakdhara (Volume 1 to 10) (co-edited with Harshad Trivedi)

== Recognition ==
Her novel Mira Yagnik Ni Dayari was awarded Goverdhanram Tripathi Award (1992–1993). Her second novel, Akhepatar, won The Sahitya Akademi Award for the year 2003 and was also awarded Priyakant Parikh Prize instituted by Gujarati Sahitya Parishad in 1999. She is also the recipient of Justice Sharda Charan Mishra Bhasha Setu Samman (award for translation; 2009) instituted by Bhasha Setu, Kolkata.

== See also ==
- List of Gujarati-language writers
