= Gateway Distriparks =

Indian logistics company

Gateway Distriparks Limited
- Type: Public
- Traded as: BSE: 543489; NSE: GATEWAY
- Industry: Logistics
- Founded: 1994
- Headquarters: Mumbai, India
- Area served: India
- Key people: Prem Kishan Gupta (Group Chairman & Managing Director); Ishaan Gupta (Joint Managing Director); Samvid Gupta (Joint Managing Director - GatewayRail); Sachin Bhanushali (CEO - Gateway Rail)
- Revenue: ▲₹ 1,527 crore (2018-19)
- Net income: ▲₹ 150 crore (2018-19)
- Number of employees: 2500
- Subsidiaries: Gateway Rail Freight Limited, Snowman Logistics Limited
- Website: www.gateway-distriparks.com

Gateway Distriparks Limited is an Indian logistics company based in Mumbai with three business verticals: container freight stations (CFS), inland container depots (ICD) with rail movement and cold chain storage and logistics. The company was founded in April 1994 and originally promoted by Newsprint Trading & Sales Corporation (NTSC), CWT Distribution Limited, NUR Investment and Trading Pvt. Ltd., and Intercontinental Forest Products Pte. Ltd. (IFP) as a joint venture company to conduct the business of warehousing, container freight stations and all related activities. As of November 2015, Prism International Private Limited (same group as NTSC) is the sole promoter of the company.

== History ==
| Year | Event |
|---|---|
| 1994 | Gateway Distriparks Limited founded |
| 1998 | GDL started CFS operations in Nhava Sheva |
| 2001 | IDFC invested ₹26 crores into GDL as private equity |
| 2004 | Temasek Holdings Singapore invested into GDL as private equity GDL acquired CFS in Chennai and CFS Vizag developed Acquisition of ICD Garhi Harsaru and development by GatewayRail |
| 2005 | GDL Listed with National Stock Exchange of India (NSE) and Bombay Stock Exchange (BSE) GDL raised ₹352.57 crore through the issue of GDR at Luxembourg |
| 2006 | GatewayRail obtained Category I CTO (container train operator) licence worth ₹50 crores GDL acquired majority stake in Snowman Frozen Foods Limited |
| 2007 | GatewayRail and Container Corporation of India (CONCOR) form venture for container terminal GDL takes over Punjab Conware CFS on 15 year operations & management (O&M) agreement |
| 2009 | Temasek sells 5.59% stake for ₹28 crore Allcargo Logistics Limited buys 5.97% stake in GDL for ₹29 crore GatewayRail starts operations at ICD Sahnewal (Punjab) |
| 2010 | The Blackstone Group invested ₹300 crores in GatewayRail |
| 2011 | GatewayRail develops ICD Faridabad International Finance Corporation (IFC) invested ₹24.89 crores in Snowman GatewayRail commences double-stack container train operations |
| 2012 | GDL starts operations at Kochi CFS The Gateway Group crossed half a million TEUs annual throughput |
| 2013 | GDL acquires a second CFS in Chennai Norwest Venture Partners invested ₹60 crores in Snowman Snowman announces approval for IPO Snowman files for IPO |
| 2014 | GDL acquires 74 lakh equity shares of Snowman for ₹ 25.9 crores ICICI Prudential buys 10 lakh shares (est. 1 million) of GDL for ₹ 22.8 crores GatewayRail starts rail operations at ICD Faridabad Snowman files red herring prospectus for an IPO of its equity shares Snowman IPO opens on 26 August in the range of ₹44-47 Snowman IPO opens and anchor investors subscribe to 94.5 lakh shares at ₹47 per share Snowman IPO oversubscribed 60 times Snowman listed at ₹76 (62% premium against issue price) GDL share price at an all-time high at ₹278.90 Snowman gives 100% returns in six sessions Snowman planning to set up 3 warehouses and increase capacity by 14,500 pallets |
| 2018 | GDL acquires Blackstone shareholding in Gateway Rail Freight Limited |
| 2019 | Started Inland Container Depot (ICD) operations at Viramgam |
| 2023 | In June 2023, Gateway Distriparks Ltd. initiated double-stack rail transportation services between Viramgam Inland Container Depot (ICD) in Ahmedabad and Mundra Port, aimed at enhancing operational efficiency and reducing logistics costs for its Export-Import (EXIM) trade customers. |

== Core Business ==
GDL operates three core businesses: Container Freight Stations (CFS), Rail-linked Inland Container Depots (ICD) and Cold Chain Storage & Logistics.

=== Container Freight Stations (CFS) ===
GDL operates Container Freight Stations, located at major Indian ports such as Navi Mumbai, Chennai, Visakhapatanam, and Kochi. The stations offer container yards, general warehousing, bonded warehousing, empty handling and RFID technologies used for container tracking. GDL also has its own dedicated fleet of over 25 rakes and 265 trailers for first and last mile connectivity.

=== Rail-linked Inland Container Depots (ICD) ===
GDL's rail operations are handled by its subsidiary, Gateway Rail Freight Limited. The ICDs are located at Garhi Harsaru (Gurgaon, Haryana), Sahnewal (Ludhiana, Punjab) and Faridabad, Haryana. In 2010, Blackstone Group had invested ₹300 crores in GatewayRail, and then in 2019 GDL bought back the entire shareholding from Blackstone. Company had announced the fifth rail linked container terminal of its subsidiary, Gateway Rail Freight Limited at Viramgam.

=== Cold Chain Logistics ===
The cold chain logistics of GDL is run by its subsidiary, Snowman Logistics Limited.
