= Akhepatar =

1999 Gujarati novel by Bindu Bhatt

Akhepatar An inexhaustible container
- Coverpage
- Author: Bindu Bhatt
- Translator: Vinod Meghani
- Language: Gujarati
- Genre: Novel
- Published: 1999
- Publisher: R.R Sheth & Co. Pvt. Ltd.
- Publication place: India
- Media type: Print (Papereback)
- Pages: 271
- Awards: Sahitya Akademi Award (2003)
- ISBN: 978-93-81336-18-2
- OCLC: 85482597
- Dewey Decimal: 891.473
- Preceded by: Mira Yagnikni Diary (1992)

Akhepatar (Gujarati: અખેપાતર, English: An inexhaustible container) is a Gujarati language novel written by Bindu Bhatt. The book was awarded the Sahitya Akademi Award for Gujarati in 2003 and received critical acclaim from several Gujarati authors, including Mansukh Salla and Chandrakant Topiwala.

== Publication history ==
The book was first published in September 1999 by R.R Sheth & Co., Ahmedabad. It was reprinted in January 2007, May 2011, and August 2012. The fourth edition includes two critical articles. Additionally, It was translated into Hindi by Virendra Narayan Sinh and published as Akshaypaatra in 2011.

== Plot summary ==
The novel begins with an aged woman named Kanchan returning to her native village in Jhalawad region of peninsular Saurashtra during the 1980s. She belongs to a Brahmin family the ancestors of which were engaged in priestly duties of the village. Having returned to the village to be with herself and chart the future as well as to come to grip with the present, She puts up at a Hindu shrine of the village and begins to reminisce. The story alternates between the past and the present. It is a chronicle of the upheavals in the protagonist's personal as well as family life. She was married to an enterprising Brahmin young man, who had migrated to Karachi before India was partitioned. The story unfolds the past on multiple time levels: Pre-independence era especially in the social context, the historical perspective of the partition days and of the socio-cultural turbulence it evoked and engulfed the family of man (This part describes her years of growth, adolescence, and marriage, motherhood), and a vivid portrayal of the violent aftermath of the partition, the fight of the refugees who survived the communal strife, their bizarre movements, separations and reunions as well as socio-economic upheavals they had to face individually and collectively, and finally the era of development and renaissance that swept through the rural Gujarat. The story thus dwells on four generations of Kanchan's clan. The post-partition narration is dominated by a very strong story element including bizarre events, unexpected turns, and ever-changing dilemma of the protagonist Kanchan. The whole novel contains dialects, proverbs and the folk tongue of Jhalawad, of Karachi and in general of Saurashtra at different times of history.
The title Akhepatar is originally a Sanskrit word Akshaypaatra (Devnagari: अक्षयपात्र) which means An inexhaustible container. The apt title characterizes the sheer courage and invincibility of the human spirit on the one hand, and alludes to the endless adversity as well as endurance that human beings, especially woman of India, are subjected to during their life.

== Critical reception ==
The book has received critical acclaim from several Gujarati authors. Mansukh Salla noted in one of his articles, "Bindu Bhatt used the form of novel extraordinarily". Chandrakant Topiwala noted that, Akhepatar has better story of women consciousness than Batris Putlini Vedna (1982) by Ila Arab Mehta and Sat Pagala Akashma (1984) by Kundanika Kapadia.

== Awards ==
The book was awarded the Sahitya Akademi Award for Gujarati in 2003. It also received the Priyakant Parikh Prize (1999), instituted by Gujarati Sahitya Parishad.
