= Ravishankar Raval =

Indian painter and art critic (1892–1977)

- Kalaguru Ravishankar Raval
- Born: 1 August 1892; Bhavnagar, Bombay Presidency, British India
- Died: 9 December 1977 (aged 85); Ahmedabad, Gujarat, India
- Education: Sir J. J. School of Art
- Occupations: painter, art critic, journalist, essayist
- Spouse: Ramaben (m. 1909)
- Children: Narendra, Gajendra, Kanak
- Awards: Ranjitram Suvarna Chandrak (1930); Padma Shri (1965)

Ravishankar Raval (1892–1977) was a painter, art teacher, art critic, journalist and essayist from Gujarat, India. He worked for the magazine Vismi Sadi until it closed in 1921, and then founded the cultural magazine Kumar.

== Life ==
Ravishankar Raval was born in a brahmin family on 1 August 1892 in Bhavnagar (now in Gujarat, India). His father Mahashanakar Raval was an officer in the British Communication Service. He spent his childhood in several towns as his father was transferred from one place to another. He wrote that he inherited his artistic instincts from his mother. He graduated from high school in 1909. During his first university year, at the local Arts College, his principal asked him to paint the stage sets for the college drama festival. He advised him to join arts by his Parsi professor Sanjana who was pleased with his artistic skills. Against his fathers non-approval, he joined Sir J. J. School of Art, Bombay. He was trained under Cecil Burns, the principal of J. J. School.

Though a promising student of the academic naturalism taught at the J. J. School and a budding portrait painter, Raval gave up these influences to embrace the revival of Indian art that was then gaining ground. In the spirit of cultural nationalism, he held on to these ideas, despite harsh criticism, such as when the Rajput-art-style painting 'Bilwamangal' for which he won the Bombay Art Society gold medal was dismissed by a Parsi artist as 'a printed label on mill cloth' He received Mayo Gold Medal at Sir J. J. School of Art in 1916.

== Career ==
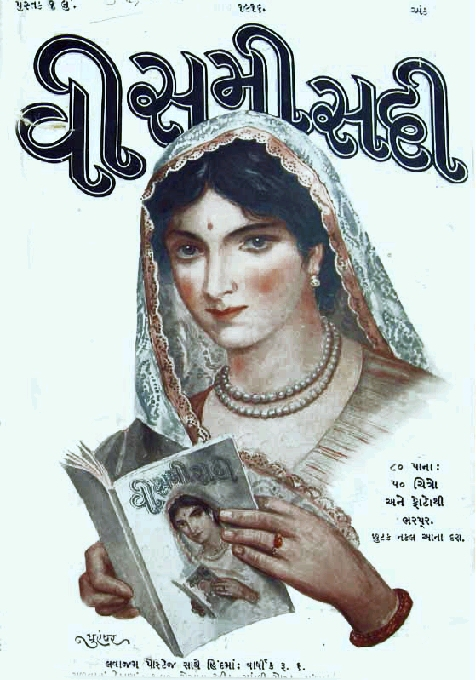
Cover of 1916 issue of Visami Sadi. Cover Art by M. V. Dhurandhar.

In 1915, Raval met a prominent journalist Hajji Mohammad Alarakhiya, who was looking for a young artist-illustrator for his new cultural magazine Visami Sadi (The Twentieth Century), and joined him. He moved to Ahmedabad and started an art school in 1919. He worked for Visami Sadi until its closing with the accidental death of Haji Mohammad in 1921. From Visami Sadi, he was inspired to start new cultural magazine Kumar at Ahmedabad in 1924, which is still published. The magazine is said to have made a great impact on Gujarati arts, and was known for its illustrations and experiments in typography. He had drawn the famous painting of the trial of Mahatma Gandhi's trial on charge of sedition on 18 March 1922 in the Circuit House of Ahmedabad where no cameras were allowed. In 1927, he conducted a month-long art study of the 1st century frescos of the Ajanta Caves. In 1936, he went on three months art tour to Japan. He had participated in annual conference of Indian National Congress in Haripura in 1938 where he painted paintings. He visited Rabindranath Tagore's university, Santiniketan in 1941. He was appointed as the President of Art Society of India and the President of Bombay Art Society in 1941. In 1948, he joined Russian artist Nicholas Roerich at his Kulu art center as the house guest. He participated in All India Art Conference at Calcutta in 1951. He went on art tour to Soviet Russia in 1952.

Other noteworthy work includes the remarkable artwork in Chandapoli, a Gujarati children's magazine and Kailash ma Ratri (A night at Mt.Kailash). Raval illustrated Bawlana Parakramo (1939), a Gujarati adaptation of the Pinocchio story by Hansa Mehta. He also drew many paintings of historical figures such as Narsinh Mehta, Mirabai, Hemchandracharya, Chandra Kaumudi, Akho which became cultural image of the characters. He is also well known for painting the characters of Kanaiyalal Munshi's novels.

He had designed quasi-realistic sets of Narsinh Mehta, the first Gujarati talkie film.

His autobiography Gujarat Ma Kala Na Pagran (Ushering of Art in Gujarat) was republished in 1998. It was reissued in 2010 with some of his works in it.

He died on 9 December 1977 at his home "Chitrakoot" in Ahmedabad after brief illness.

== Style ==
He evolved his own rich style, inspired by the Indian classical painting traditions. He was influenced by Raja Ravi Verma's religious oleographs. He was influenced by Tagore's informal open studios which influenced his Gujarat Chitra Kala Sangh.

He was given the title of Kalaguru, the master of art, by Gujarati author Kakasaheb Kalelkar for his contribution in art in Gujarat. His art school produced several notable artists of India such as Kanu Desai.

== Recognition ==
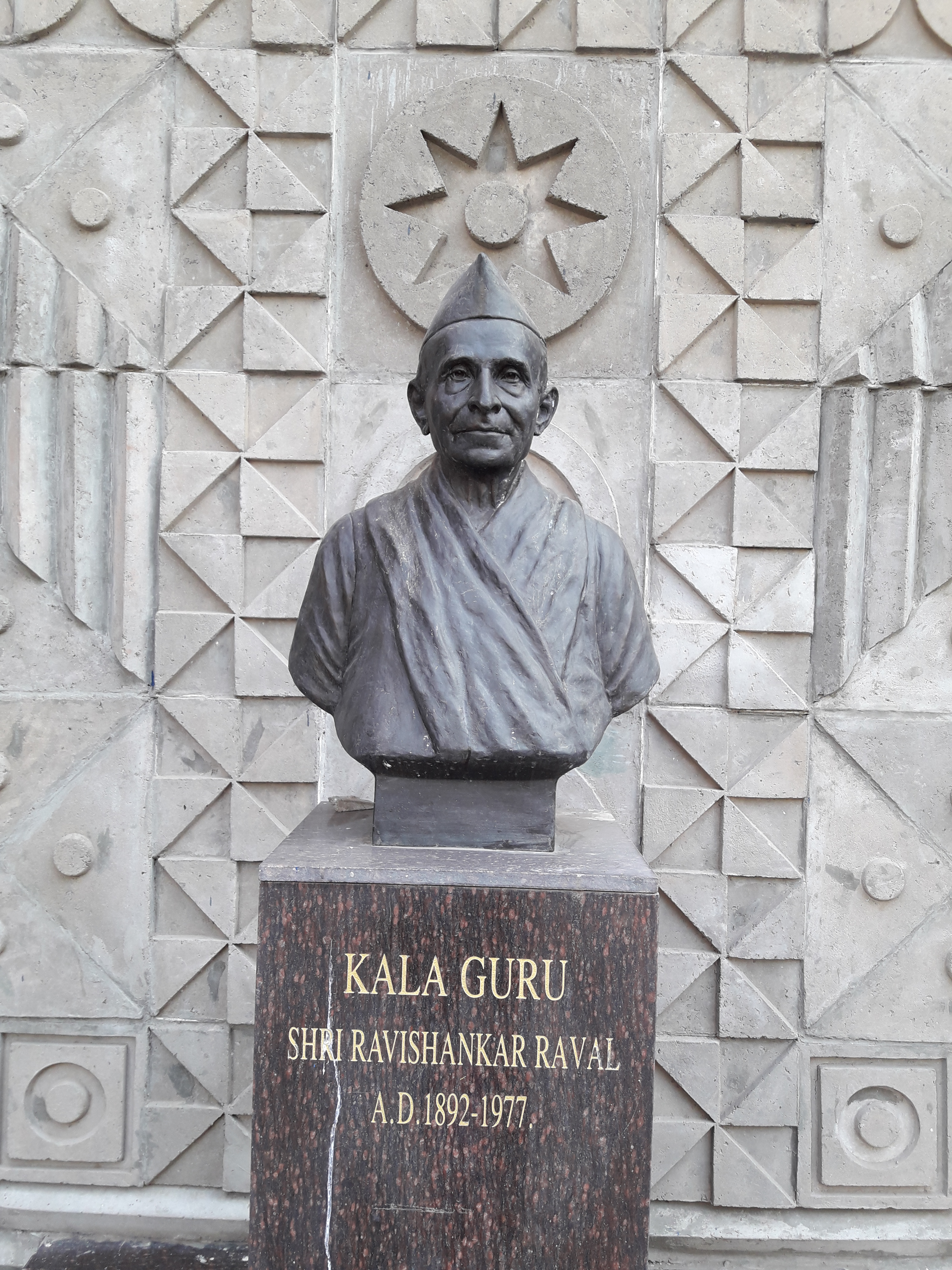
Bust of Ravishankar Raval at Ravishankar Raval Kala Bhavan, Ahmedabad

During his career, Raval received several awards and medals. He received Mayo Gold Medal at Sir J. J. School of Art in 1916. He was awarded Gold medal from the Bombay Art Society in 1917. He won second prize in art-in-industry Expo at Calcutta in 1923. He received Ranjitram Suvarna Chandrak (1930), the highest literary award in Gujarati literature for his art essays. He received Kalidas Prize in 1925. He received Nehru Award for his book on Russia in 1965. Later he was awarded Padma Shri, the fourth highest civilian award of India, in 1965. He was accepted as the Fellow of the Lalit Kala Akademi in 1970.

== Personal life ==
He married Ramaben in 1909. They had three sons; Narendra, Gajendra and Kanak. Kanak completed an M.S. in Pharmacy from the University of Michigan in 1953, and a PhD in Pharmacy from the University of Iowa in 1956. He permanently emigrated to the U.S. in the 1960s and dedicated his later life to translating his father's biography from Gujarati to English. He passed in 2022.

== Bibliography ==
- Munshi's World Of Imagination: With 35 art plates in full colours. Bharatiya Vidya Bhavan. 1962.
