= Viramgam =

- Town
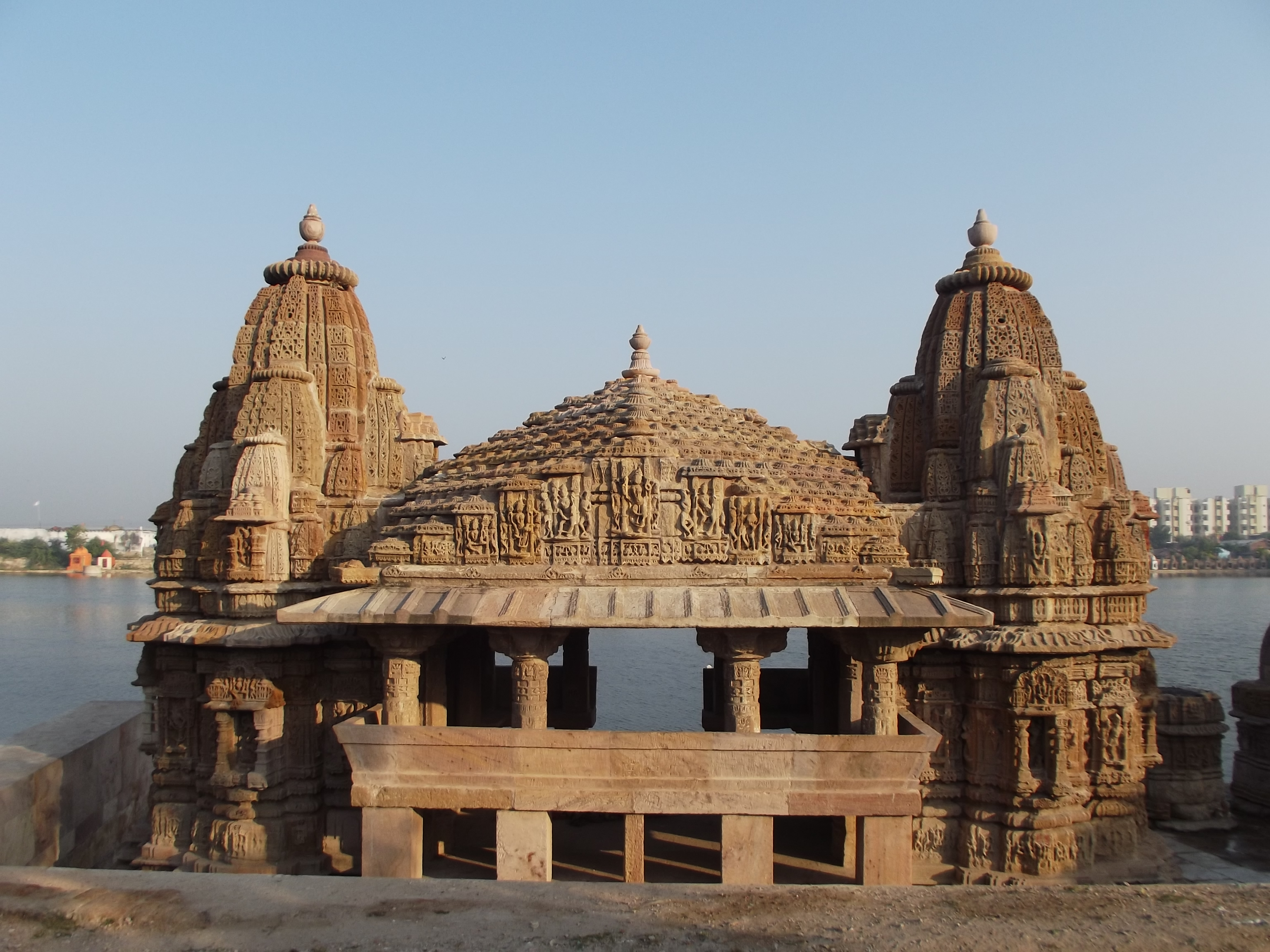
- Munsar lake

- Location in Gujarat, India Viramgam (India)
- Coordinates: 23.12°N 72.03°E
- Country: India
- State: Gujarat
- District: Ahmedabad
- Founder: King Viramdev
- Named for: King Viramdev

Government
  - Type: Municipality

Area
  - Total: 19 km^{2} (7.3 sq mi)
  - Rank: 1'st Rank (with compare to other tehsil(taluka) of Ahmedabad)
- Elevation: 32 m (105 ft)

Population (2011)
  - Total: 50,612
  - Density: 2,700/km^{2} (6,900/sq mi)
- Demonym: Viramgami/amdavadi

Languages
  - Official: Gujarati, Hindi, English
- Time zone: UTC+5:30 (IST)
- PIN: 382150
- Telephone code: 02715
- Vehicle registration: GJ-27
- Sex ratio: 0.93 ♀/♂
- Literacy rate: 84.41%

Viramgam is a town and former princely state in the Indian state of Gujarat. The town is located in the Ahmedabad district, which contains the city of Ahmedabad, the state's largest city. Gateway Distriparks notably flagged off the first export train service from the newly built inland container depot (ICD) at Viramgam.

== History ==
=== Recorded history ===
Around 1090, Minaldevi, the mother of Jayasimha Siddharaja of Chaulukya dynasty who ruled from Anhilwad Patan, commissioned the Munsar lake. Siddhraj added several shrines and temples later. Viramgam state was founded in c. 1484.

Under the strong Mandal chief, Viramgam did not become part of the Muslim Gujarat Sultanate until 1530. Commanding the entrance to Kathiawar, the Mughal governors chose it as the headquarters of the Jhalavad prant (district), and in the disturbances of the eighteenth century, it was the scene of several struggles.

=== Medieval History ===
Following the conquest of Gujarat by the Delhi Sultanate in 1299, the region became part of the Sultanate's dominions. In 1407, Gujarat emerged as the independent Gujarat Sultanate, under whose rule several mosques, dargahs, and other monuments were constructed in the area. After the annexation of Gujarat by the Mughal Empire in 1573, the region remained under Mughal administration until the eighteenth century, when it gradually came under Maratha influence.

==== Viramgam Satyagraha ====
On the way to visit his family in Sorath, Mahatma Gandhi stopped at the train station in Viramgam. There he became aware that passengers were being harassed by a customs cordon. Gandhi raised this issue for years through political channels, but it only was resolved in 1919 when he personally met the Viceroy of India Lord Chelmsford.

=== Historical and legendary references ===
According to Dr. Savliya, author of "Ancient lakes of Gujarat," one of the rooms on the Musar lake has ancient writing of the person who built this lake. That is believed to be a proof according to which it seems like this lake was built by King Viramdev Vaghela. In that writing, his wife's name is also there, Queen Sumla Devi.

According to another story, King Bhimdev II had given land on samvat 1295 of Ghusdi village (now known as Viramgam). That land is used for Musar lake. Still today there is Ghusdiya lake and Ghusdiya ground in Viramgam which proves that earlier Viramgam was known as Ghusdi.

According to another story, Barbara Bhut (Ghost) who was a slave of King Siddhraj Jaysinh built this lake in one night.

== Lakes ==
The town is surrounded by three reservoirs: the Gangasar lake on the south-east and south, lying outside of the wall except a small portion known as the Gusaria lake; in the south-west beyond the Gangasar gate the Dhunia lake; and in the west the Munsar lake.

=== Munsar lake ===
Munsar lake was built about 1090 by Minaldevi, the mother of Siddhraj Jaisinh. Formerly known as Mansarovar, now shortened into Mansar or Munsar lake is 220 yards round, shaped like the conch and is surrounded by flights of stone steps. Gathering from the west, the water passes into a stone-built eight sided silt-well, kund, with, in a niche in each side, a figure cut in bold relief.

From the silt-well, through a stone-lined channel and a three-cylinder tunnel, the water passes into the lake. Over the tunnel is a large pyramid-roofed pavilion repaired by the Marathas, and a temple of Bahuchar Mata, or, as she is locally called, Mansar Mata. Towards the north the steps round the lake are ruinous, and in several places, broken roadways run down to the water's edge. Around the top of the steps runs a row of small spire-roofed shrines, many now wanting but once said to have numbered more than 300. In each shrine on one side of the lake is a pedestal, probably for an image of Krishna, and on the other side a round basin, jaladhar, probably sacred to Shiva. On either side of one of the roadways that run to the water's edge, is a larger temple with a double porch and spire and across the lake is a flat-roofed colonnade. In 2023, Hardik Patel, BJP MLA, urged Union Minister of Culture, G Kishan Reddy, to restore Munsar Lake in Gujarat's Viramgam and requested the appointment of an Archaeological Survey of India (ASI) team for its maintenance.

=== Gangasar lake ===
The Gangasar lake is the largest lake of the city and it was built about eight hundred years ago by Sufi (Muslim mystic) saint Hazrat Alauddin Shah Chishty's disciple Hazrat Islahuddin by the order of his Master. Islahuddin was born Hindu and his birth name was Gangu Vanjara. According to legend, he converted to Islam after watching miracles by Aladdin Shah. He built a lake at the order of Hazrat Aladdin Shah, which was named Gangasagar after his birth name Gangu Vanjara. The name later shortened to Gangasar. The Mausoleum (Burial Place or Tombs) of both Sufis is located at the North West Bank of Gangasar lake in the Dargah Compound of Hazrat Alauddin Shah chishty including other Muslim Saints of Medieval Era.

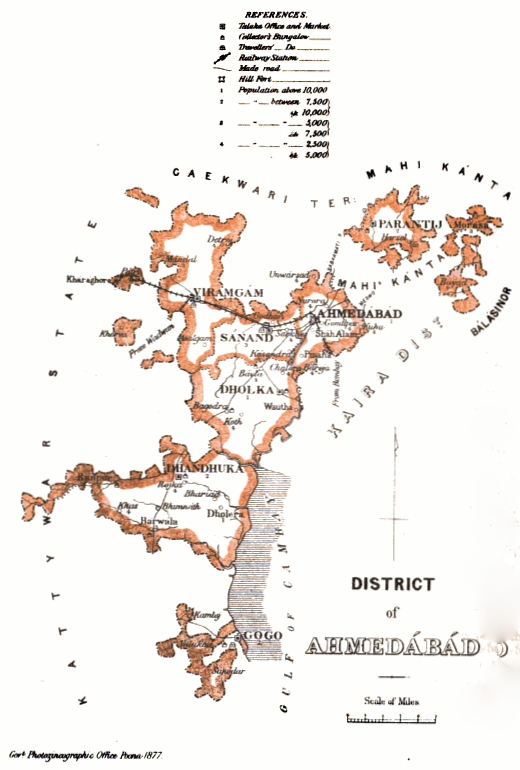
Viramgam on map of Ahmedabad district, under Bombay Presidency, British India 1877

== Fort ==
According to the Gazetteer of the Bombay Presidency: Ahmedabad, the fort of Viramgam was constructed in 1741 by Viramdev Desai, a Kanbi ruler of the region. The fortified town originally had five principal gates: Gangasar (or Kasampura) Gate, Raiyapur Gate, Munsar Gate, Golvadi Gate, and Bharvadi Gate. A sixth entrance, known as Sareshwar Gate, was added after India's independence.

== Places of Interest ==
=== Dargah of baba Sayyah ===
The Dargah of Baba Sayyah, also known as Sheikh Mehmud Pir Shailani, is a 14th-century mausoleum located in Moti Kumad, a village situated approximately 8 km from Viramgam in Gujarat, India. The shrine is dedicated to the saint who is mentioned in the book Mirat-i-Ahmadi as one of the spiritual figures associated with the foundation of Ahmedabad, alongside the Four Ahmads and twelve Sufis who are said to have participated in laying the foundation of the city. believed to be a disciple of Hazrat Nizamuddin Auliya of Delhi.

=== Karakthal ===
According to the Ahmedabad District Gazetteer, Karakthal is an ancient village in Viramgam Taluka. Local tradition associates the site with the remains of Kankuvati, a settlement believed to date back to the period of the Mahabharata. It is said that the original settlement was destroyed during the medieval period and was subsequently renamed Karakthal.

=== Nal sarovar ===
Nalsarovar Bird Sanctuary is a natural lake located in Viramgam Taluka. It is one of the largest natural wetlands in Gujarat and serves as an important habitat and seasonal resting place for hundreds of species of resident and migratory birds, including many that arrive from foreign countries during the winter months.

== Other places ==
The city and its surrounding villages contain numerous historical monuments, including temples dating to the Maratha period and earlier and mosques and dargahs associated with the Delhi Sultanate, Gujarat Sultanate and Mughal eras including 15th Century Eidgah beside Munsar Lake and a Government Municipal building constructed during the British period along the banks of Gangasar Lake.

== Geography ==
Viramgam is located at 23.12°N 72.03°E. It has an average elevation of 32 metres (105 ft). The old town of Viramgam is surrounded by a rectangular, tower flanked brick and stone wall, about 21 miles round.

In the wall are five gates: on the north, the Golwadi gate leading to Patan; on the north-east, the Bharwadi gate (23.124835°N 72.053584°E) leading to the railway station; on the east, the Raipuri or Rayyapur gate (23.121602°N 72.056619°E) leading to Ahmedabad; on the south-west, the Gangasar gate; and on the west, the Mansar or Munsar gate (23.120664°N 72.045695°E).

There are also two unopened gateways on the north-west (23.124886°N 72.045340°E) and north-east, and in the south face is a window through which water is drawn from the Gangasar lake. Viramgam is the gateway of Saurashtra (Kathiyawad) region. It is famously called Via Viramgam. There is a movie called Via Viramgam released in 1980 by Avinash Vyaas. Track list પ્રફુલ દવે* અને કોરસ*– અમે છૈયે વાયા વિરમગામનાં B1 આશા ભોંસલે* અને મહેન્દ્ર કપુર*– ઓ અહમદબાદની અલબેલી B2 પ્રફુલ દવે* અને કોરસ*– અણજાણી ધરતીને

== Government ==
The town is represented in the Gujarat Legislative Assembly in the Viramgam constituency. Since 2022, the constituency has been represented by Hardik Patel of the Bhartiya Janta Party. Nationally, the town is a part of the Lok Sabha constituency of Surendranagar, which has been represented by Mahendra Munjapara of the Bharatiya Janata Party since 2019.

== Connectivity/transportation ==
=== Air ===
The closest major airport to Viramgam is Sardar Vallabhbhai Patel International Airport (AMD / VAAH). This airport is in Ahmedabad, India and is 71 km (44 mi) from the centre of Viramgam and provides connectivity with domestic flights to the metropolitan and other major cities of India. It also provides many international flights from Ahmedabad to destinations around the world.

=== Rail ===
Viramgam is well connected to other major cities of the country via regular trains.

Railway Station(s): Viramgam Junction (VG)

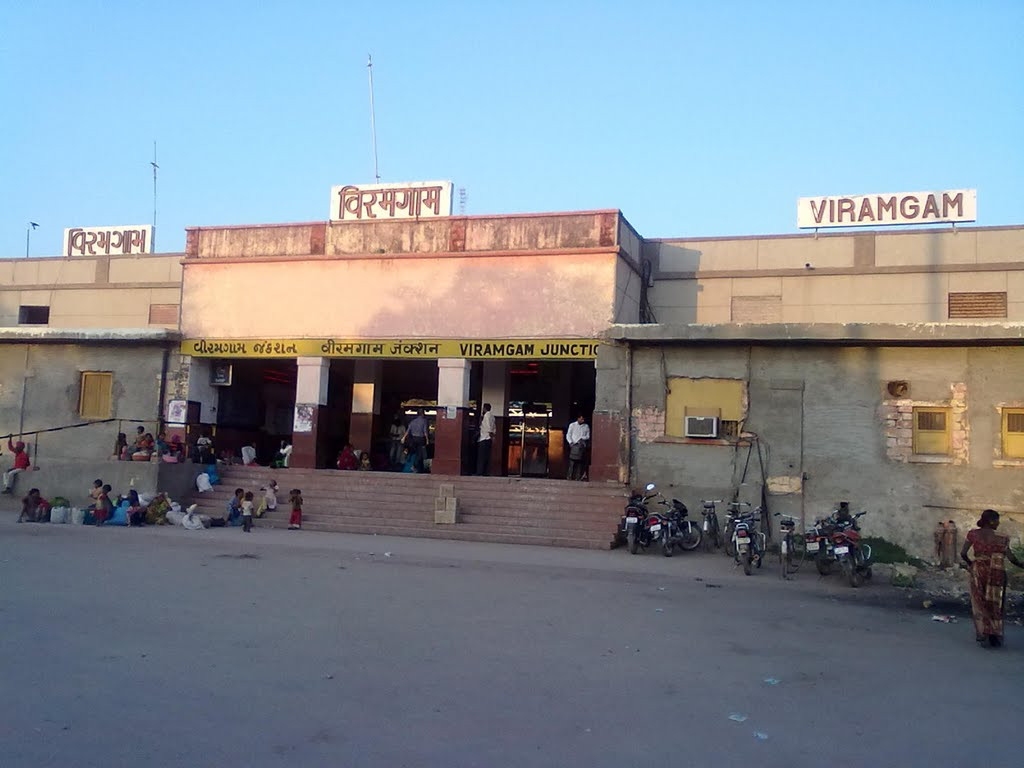
Viramgam Railway Station

Viramgam used to be the point of intersection of BB & CI Railway and the Saurashtra Railway. Viramgam is at the intersection of four railway lines: Ahmedabad-Viramgam, Viramgam-Surendranagar, Viramgam-Mehsana, and Viramgam-Dhrangdhra-Samakhyali lines. It is at the intersection of the routes splitting towards Kachchh and Saurashtra while travelling from Ahmedabad. It is also having Inland Container Depot (ICD) facility by Gateway Distriparks. In June 2023, Gateway Distriparks Ltd. initiated double-stack rail transportation services between Viramgam Inland Container Depot (ICD) in Ahmedabad and Mundra Port, aimed at enhancing operational efficiency and reducing logistics costs for its Export-Import (EXIM) trade customers.

=== Road ===
Viramgam is connected to Ahmedabad, Kutch, Mumbai, New Delhi through the National Highway 947. The location is also connected to Saurashtra through the GJ SH 17.

=== Bus ===
Regular buses transit to Viramgam Bus Station from other major cities of the country.

=== Other industry ===
There is a crude oil storage tank depot at Viramgam on the Salya-Mathura oil pipeline of the Indian Oil Corporation.

== Notable people ==
People who were born in, residents of, or otherwise closely associated with Viramgam include:

- Dhiru Parikh (1933 – 2021), Gujarati writer and critic
- Bhadreshkumar Chetanbhai Patel (born 1990), alleged murderer and fugitive on the FBI Ten Most Wanted Fugitives list
- Hardik Patel - BJP MLA
