= Kumar (magazine) =

- Cover page, October 2016
- Chief editor: Dhiru Parikh
- Co-editor: Praful Raval
- Categories: Cultural magazine
- Frequency: Monthly
- Publisher: Kumar Trust
- Founder: Ravishankar Raval
- First issue: January 1924
- Country: India
- Based in: Ahmedabad
- Language: Gujarati
- OCLC: 5107841

Kumar (Gujarati: કુમાર) is a Gujarati literary magazine founded by Gujarati artist and author Ravishankar Raval in 1924. It is now edited by Dhiru Parikh. The headquarters is in Ahmedabad, Gujarat, India.

== History ==
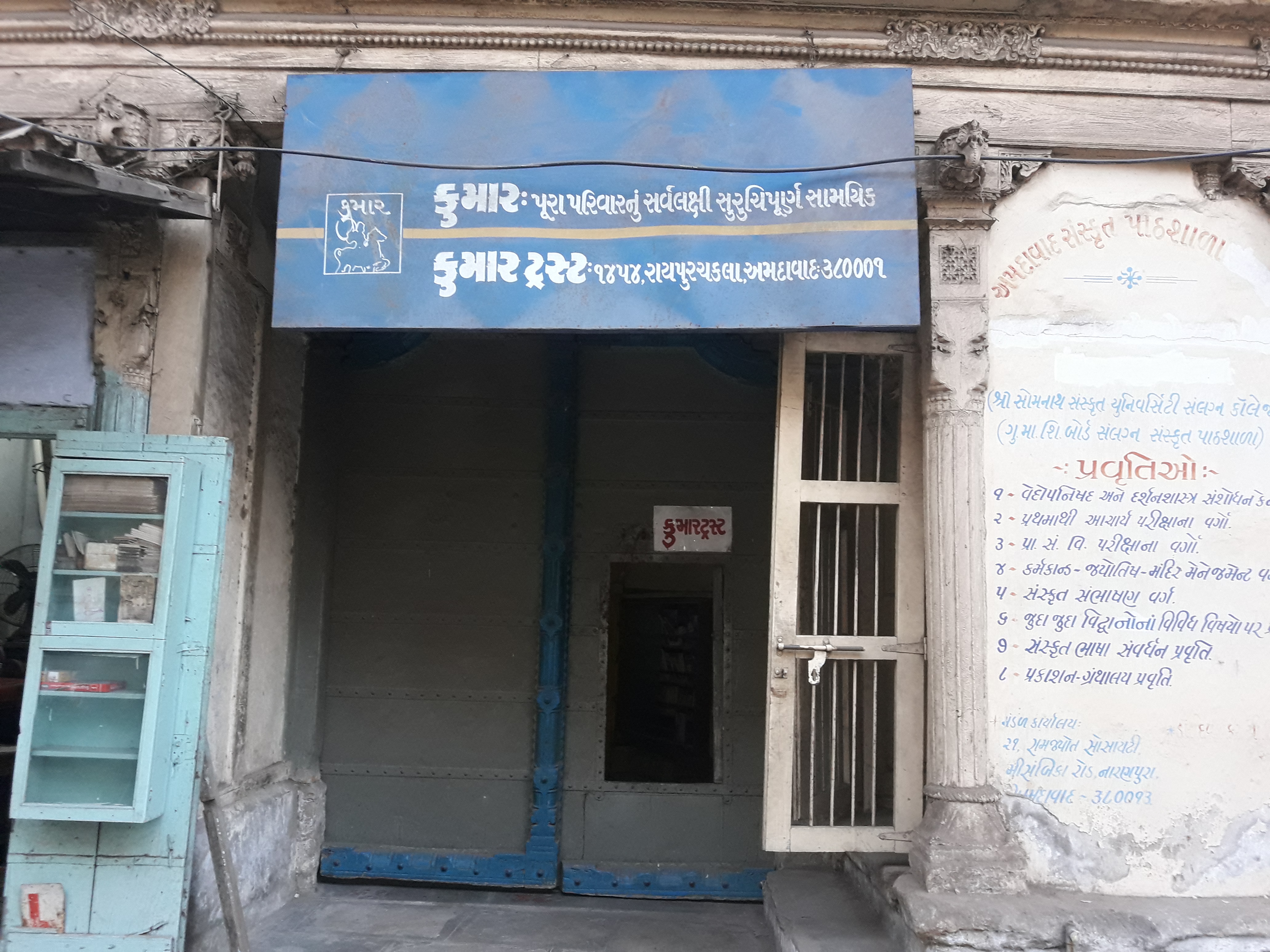
Kumar office, known as "Kumar Karyalaya" is located in Raipur area of Ahmedabad

Kumar was founded by Ravishankar Raval in Ahmedabad in 1924. The magazine was started as an avant-garde cultural publication. Bachubhai Ravat served as editor-in-chief from 1924 to 1942 with him. After the death of Ravishankar Raval, Bachubhai served as editor until 1980. After the death of Bachubhai in 1980, Biharibhai Tank became the editor of magazine. In 1987, it was closed. After three years, in 1990, under the editorship of Dhiru Parikh, the publication resumed. Praful Raval serves as the co-editor of the magazine.

In April 2011, the 1000th issue of magazine was released.

== See also ==
- Kumar Gold Medal
- List of Gujarati-language magazines
