= Children's literature in Gujarati language =

The Children's literature in Gujarati language of India has its roots in traditional folk literature, Puranic literature, epics and fables from Sanskrit literature. Following 1830s, the large number of stories and fables adapted and translated from various traditional and western sources started to appear in Gujarati. Led by Gijubhai Badheka and Nanabhai Bhatt, the children's literature expanded rapidly in form of stories, poems, rhymes and riddles. Several authors and poets wrote for children intermittently and exclusively. Large number of magazines catering to children were published by middle of twentieth century. Later adventure novels, science fiction, young-adult fiction were also published. Ramanlal Soni and Jivram Joshi contributed for five decades creating stories, fictional characters and novels. Few children's plays were published while the biographies of historical characters appeared frequently.

== Children's stories ==
There are several stories popular in Gujarati folk literature which relate to children. There is a long tradition of Purana stories in Indian literature which deals with topics, particularly myths, legends and other traditional lore. The stories derived from Ramayana, Mahabharata, Panchtantra, Hitopadesha and anecdotes of Akbar-Birbal, Bhoja-Kalidas, Singhasan Battisi, Baital Pachisi, Śukasaptati are told to children for generations.

The current form of children's literature started after the education in Gujarati was aligned to western pattern in 1826 during British Raj. The Native Schools and Books Society established in Bombay in 1820 had published books for new schools. They were for co-curriculum reading. Initial works in Gujarati children's literature were translations and adaptations. In 1826, Bapulal Shastri Pandya translated Aesop's Fables in Gujarati as Aesop Nitikathao. In next few years more translations of Aesop's Fables published. The Gulliver's Travels translated as Gulliverni Musafari. In 1831, the two parts of Balamitra was published starting an era of current form of children's literature. It had poems, stories, anecdotes and jokes. Ranchhodbhai Dave published Isapnitini Vato adapted from Aesop's Fables in 1859. The Bombay Education Society published four books in 1840; Shishusadbodhmala, Balamitra, Balasathi and Panch Pakhaon (Panchapakhyana); having poems, stories, anecdotes, biographies for children. Amichandra wrote Batrish Pultini Varta based on Singhasan Battisi.

Initially there were translations of stories from classic Indian literature. Tunki Kahanio (1881) published by Anubhai Neelkanth had 118 translated stories. Hargovinddas Kantawala published adapted short stories Tachukadi So Vaat in six volumes. He also wrote novel regarding misrule of the foolish king in 1887. He also published Kanyavanchanamala, the first book exclusively for girls. Ichchharam Desai translated Evenings at Home as Balako No Anand (1895). He also wrote Ghashiram Kotwal (1903) based on Ghashiram from Maratha history. Jaysukhlal Joshipura adapted Alice's Adventures in Wonderland as Alka no Adbhut Pravas. Narayan Hemchandra wrote Mahabharat Ni Vartao (1904) based on events from the epic Mahabharata. Manchharam Ghelaram edited a collection of tales, Murakho, the fool, which was a theme on which several others had written. Sharda Mehta published Puranvarta Sangraha (1906) based on mythological tales from Purana. Kalyanrag Joshi published Deshdeshni Vato (1914) and Vigyan ni Vato (1914) about worldview and science respectively.

The original children's literature rapidly expanded due to efforts of Gijubhai Badheka who was actively involved in reforms in children's education. He started the musical literature for children and is considered the father of children's literature in Gujarati. He published five books in 1922 and later cofounded a school, Dakshinamoorti, in Bhavnagar which published large number of books for children. He was joined by Jugatram Dave, Taraben Modak, Mulshankar Bhatt, Vishnu Trivedi, Harbhai Trivedi, Ramnarayan Pathak, and several others. Nanabhai Bhatt published stories based on characters from Ramayana and Mahabharata as well as Hindu Dharma ni Akhyayikao for young adults. Mulshankar Bhatt translated science fictional adventure novels by Jules Verne in Gujarati. He wrote Sahsikoni Shrusti, a simplified version of Jules Verne's The Mysterious Island, and Khajanani Shodhma, a simplified version of Stevenson's Treasure Island. Dakshinamoorti published more than 150 children's books.

Natvarlal Malvi and Ishwarlal Vimavala established Gandiv in Surat which published works for young-adults. They published illustrated 30 stories of popular anthropomorphic animal character Bakor Patel created by Hariprasad Vyas. Other major authors were Kaushiram Pandya, Chhaganlal Pandya, Chimanlal Bhatt, Dhirajlal Shah, Manubhai Jodhani, Dhumketu, Tarachandra Adalja, Bhimbhai Desai, Subhadra Gandhi, Bhikhabhai Vyas, Jaybhikhkhu, Himmatlal Shah, Niranjan Varma and Prasannavadan Dixit. Bholashankar Vyas wrote humorous stories for children. Ratilal Nanabhai Tanna, Vasant Nayak and Mahesh 'Mast Fakir' also wrote several stories. Foram Lahario by Sharda Prasad Varma and Vanarsena ni Vato by Keshav Prasad Desai were also published. Ramanlal N. Shah, Sumati Patel and Nagardas Patel published some stories under title of Baljeevan and Balvinod. Jhaverchand Meghani also wrote some patriotic stories for children. Hansa Jivraj Mehta wrote Balvartavali, Arun Nu Adbhut Swapna, Baval Na Parakramo. Chandrashankar Bhatt published Balmitra which published stories which were later collected as Balmitra Ni Vato, Sindbad Sheth, Kumar Veersen.

Two major authors who published extensively in children's literature were Ramanlal Soni and Jivram Joshi who contributed for more than five decades. Ramanlal Joshi created Galbo Shiyal and associated animal stories. For example, his Mangalu was popular among children. Jivram Joshi created several popular characters including Miya Fuski, Chhel-Chhabo, Chhako-Mako, Adukiyo-Dadukiyo. Other popular character based stories were Bogho of Harshad Patel, Vinu of Navalkant Bhavsar, Venakaka of Juga Pandya, Fatubha Fankda Na Parakramo by Manubhai Shah, Shekhchalli of Jaymalla Parmar, Akkad ane Fakkad of Narad, Budhiyo of Madhusudan Parekh, Soti and Pothi of Dhananjay Shah, Miyalabbe of Chandrkant Amin and Muchhala Menamasi of Dhiraj Brahmabhatt.

In the field of science fiction, Shrikant Trivedi, Harish Nayak, Yashwant Mehta, Dhirajlal Gajjar, Ratilal Nayak, Kanaiyalal Ramanuj, Girish Ganatra, Rajni Vyas, Suresh Jethna, Nagendra Vijay, Yashwant Kadikar, Kishor Pandya, Nagin Modi, Bipin Patel, Ishwar Parmar, Sakalchand Saheb contributed. The stories based on Panchtantra, Hitopadesha, Akbar-Birbal folk tales, Mulla Nasiruddin, Tenali Rama are frequently translated and written by various authors over the years. Popular works from world literature such as Tarzan, Hercules, Robinson Crusoe, Gulliver's Travels are frequently adapted in Gujarati by various authors.

In animal fables, Ramanlal Soni, Vijaygupta Maurya, Manubhai Jodhani, Nanubhai Surati, Kanaiyalal Ramanuj, Harjivan Somaiya, Vasantlal Parmar contributed. Sarkas Doctor Na Romanchak Sahaso by Vijaygupta Maurya is noteworthy among them. Mukul Kalarthi, Kumarpal Desai, Mahendra Trivedi, Upendra Bhatt wrote large number of fables.

Several artist wrote or illustrated stories including comics and graphic stories. Ravishankar Raval, Somalal Shah, Rajni Vyas, Chakor, Abid Surti, Natu Mistry, Ramesh Kothari, V. Ramanuj, Lalit Lad, Nirmal Sarteja, Deepak Thakor are notable among them.

Some novels or novellas were also written for children. Gulabi Aarass Ni Laggi by Harikrishna Pathak, Tilli by Mahendra Trivedi, Navjivan Shala by Madhav Desai, Durga No Deepak by Shraddha Trivedi, Varun Nu Soneri Swapna by Madhusudan Parekh, Prakash Na Parevada by Kanaiyalal Joshi, Khovayeli Duniyani Safare by Yashwant Mehta are some novels. Some women in the children's literature are Jagruti Ramanuj, Sulbha Depurkar, Usha Upadhyay, Aruna Mistry, Lata Hirani, Bepsy Engineer, Kalindi Parikh, Neha Kansara, Pushpa Antani, Neeta Ramaiya and Tarlika Mehta.

In recent times, the large number of classic adventure novels from the world literature are translated and published in Gujarati.

== Children's poetry ==
Very young children's poetry

The poetry for very young children include lullaby, rhymes, riddles. Halarda (1928) is a collection of lullabies by Jhaverchand Meghani. Keshavlal Parikh published collection of riddles, Koyada Sangrah (1870). Kavtuka Samgraha (1885) and Padshah are Leva (1886) are published by Parsi writer Marzban. The first deals with general knowledge in light manner while the second present it in puzzle format. Gijubhai Badheka published a collection of rhymes, Jodakna (1937) selected from folk literature. Deshalji Parmar was a major contributor of original rhymes. His rhyme collection Galgoato (1930) is notable. Kanji Kalidas Joshi had edited Bal Ukhana (1929) which is the book of riddles published before the independence of India.

Other books for very young include Mitro Na Jodakna (1993) by Dhiruben Patel, Pappa No Thappo (1992) by Badal, Jodakna Ni Maja (1993), Sarvariya (1980) and Zagmagiya (1983) by Amritlal Parekh, Tari Mari Doreli (1988) and Pandade Podhya Patangiya (1998) by Dhansukhlal Parekh.

Children's poetry

Gujarati children's poetry started as an educational instrument. In 1848, Dalpatram wrote humorous children's poetry from inspiration from earlier fables. When new education department was formed by the British authorities, he had edited series of new Gujarati textbooks under leadership of Theodore Hope. His was perhaps the first original writing for children in Gujarati which also included first children's poem. His Andheri Nagari Ne Gandu Raja, Dayali Ma, Sharanaivalo and Unt Na Adhar Ang Vanka are notable among them. These poems has simple story; simple tune, words and rhymes; message with humour. In 1866, Navalram Pandya had written garba songs for children which were published in Shalapatra and later as Bal Garbavali. One song of it Janavarni Jan became very popular. Nhanalal also wrote poetry for children. His Ganya Ganay Nahi, Vinya Vinay Nahi is popular among children. Balakavya (1915) by Krishnaprasad Bhatt had poems with natural rhymes. Ajab Jevi Vaat Chhe by Upendracharyaji was very popular. Himmatlal Anjariya published a poetry collection Madhubindu (1915). Tribhuvan Vyas wrote Nava Geeto (1929) and Gunjarava (1941) focused on natural elements such as river, hills, rain and sea. Jhaverchand Meghani published poetry collections; Veni Na Phool (1931) and Killol (1932). His Kaludi Kutari was popular. His poems Charankanya and Shivaji Nu Halardu are also notable. His poems were simple and effective. Tribhuvandas Luhar 'Sundaram' published poetry collection Rang Rang Vadaliya (1939), Chak Chak Chakla, Aa Avya Patangiya and Gato Gato Jay Kanaiyo. These all are collections are published in a single volume Samagra Balkavita (2005).

Educationists Gijubhai Badheka and Nanabhai Bhatt established the children's literature in its true understanding and as the foundation of the education and moral development. Their scientific methods in education and children's literature were appreciated. Harbhai Trivedi, Taraben and Monghiben continued their tradition.

Chandravadan Mehta wrote Chandapoli and Dudhna Dana. Somabhai Bhavsar wrote a collection of rhymes Kharek Topara and three other collections; Gunjan (1939), Bham (1951) and Chagdol (1961). In 1960, he also edited three anthologies of singable children's poems. Balako Na Geeto, Magodi No Pipudivalo, Pagala, Madh No Ladvo, Kashi No Pandit are the collections by Ramanlal Soni. They were published in 1979. Snehrashmi wrote popular prayer Namie Tujne Varamvar. He also experimented with Haiku format. Tarapo (1980) and Ujani (1980) are his poetry collections. His experiences as a teacher and a poet are visible in his poems. His poems has tunes and rhymes which can be easily captured by children as well as they are singable; filled with imagination, inspiration and entertainment. After 1950, Rajendra Shah (Morpichchh, Ambe Avyo Mor and Roomzoom), Balmukund Dave (Allak Dallak, Sonchampo), Makarand Dave (Zabuk Vijali Zabuk) also wrote children's poetry. Suresh Dalal published more than dozen poetry collections including Ittakitta and Tingatoli (1976) in his three decade long career. According to Harikrishna Pathak, Dalal brought children's poetry from its rural background to urban setup.

Ramesh Parekh is prolific children's poet of modern era. His command on tune, novelty, amazement, imagination, teasing writing style are visible in his poetry. Hauk (1978), Chin (1980), Itta, Kitta Ane Buchcha, Dariyo Zullam Zulla, Hasie Khullam Khulla are his collections. Chandrakant Sheth's Chandaliyani Gadi (1980) depicts different styles of songs and different mentalities of children. Harikrishna Pathak also captures amazement in his collection Koinu Kaink Khovay Chhe (1981). Tofan (1979) by Yoseph Macwan includes songs with catchy tunes.

The poet Pinakin Trivedi, studied at Santiniketan, brought melody and rhymes of children's poetry by Rabindranath Tagore. Other children's poetry collections are Balshikshan Ni Garbavali by Gopalji Delwadakar, Kanya Garbavali and Balgeeto by Manishankar Dave, Bal Kavitao by Dhirajlal Bhatt, Gauri Na Geeto by Deshalji Parmar, Chalo Gaeye by Madhukant G. Mehta, Chandapoli by Vasant Nayak, Kilkilat by Jamubhai Dani, Naginavadi by Ramnik Aralvala, Chhbchhabiya by Avinash Vyas, Balkavya Mala by Viththalrai Avasthi, Balgeetavali by Keshav Sheth, Zulto Hathi by Pranshankar Upadhyay, Dada Ni Muchh by Shantikumar Pandya, Chanibor by Jugatram Dave.

Several other poets also contributed including Umashankar Joshi, Bhanuprasad Pandya, Suresh Majmudar, Pujalal Dalwadi, Rashid Munshi, Ravindra Thakor, Phillip Clerk, Raksha Dave, Kanti Kadia, Natwar Patel, Sushilaben Zaveri. Kirit Purohit experimented with ghazal while Harikrishna Pathak with sonnet. Ilakavyo by Chandravadan Mehta; Janani Ni Jod Sakhi by Damodar Botadkar; Bharat No Zando and Gunvanti Gujarat by Ardeshar Khabardar and Lucy Grey by Viththalrai Avasthi are notable poems. Udayan Thakker has also published books on children's poetry.

== Children's plays ==
Gijubhai Badheka published two volumes of children's plays through Dakshinamurti. Jugatram Dave wrote Andhala Nu Gadu and Galli Mari Ghrrr Jay. Gandiv published several plays under Chalo Bhajavie series during the same period. Other notable plays are Rangtoran and Rangdwar etc. by Jayanti Dalal; Ishwar Nu Mandir by Kismat Qureshi, Balko no Bandhav by Gaurishankar Chaturvedi, Antar Na Ajwala by Jethalal Chaudhri, Eklavya ane Biji Natikao by Pragji Dosa, Aa Rotli Kon Khashe? by Shanta Gandhi and Asman Ni Chilli by Leena Mangaldas.

== Biographies ==
The children's literature in Gujarati is rich with biographies. Pranlal Mathurdas and Anandrav Champaji translated Robertson as Columbus No Vrutant in 1839 which was the first translated biography but is not targeted for children. Gijubhai Badheka published Kathanatya Granthmala which included biographies of Shivaji Maharaj, Buddhacharitra, Harishchandra, Gopichand etc. Jugatram Dave published Balko Na Gandhiji focused on Mahatma Gandhi. Dhirajlal Bhatt published several biographies under Adarsh Charitavali. Sayaji Balgyanmala is a series written by several authors focused on historical figures and patriots. The historical characters such as Mahatma Gandhi, Vinoba Bhave, Shivaji, Vivekanand, Ramakrishna, Lal Bahadur Shastri are also appear as biographical stories frequently.

== Publications ==
The children's magazine played important role for spread and popularity of children's literature. Satyoday (1862) was the first children's magazine in Gujarati. Other magazines were Baloday (1877), Balmitra (1879), Balgyanvardhak (1882), Balshikshak (1911), Balako No Bandhu (1912), Balak (1923), Gandiv (1925), Balwadi (1927), Balodhyan (1931), Kishor (1935), Balsakha (1937), Baljagat (1939), Vidyarthi (1941), Ramakadu (1949), Zagmag (1952), Balsandesh (1952), Balkanaiyo (1954), Chandamama (1954), Rasranjan (1958), Sabras (1962), Rasvinod (1965), Baldakshina (1966), Fulwadi (1967), Pagalee (1968), Chandapoli (1968), Suman Sanskar (1977), Bulbul (1977), Balmasti (1979), Nayak (1979), Vandarful (1981), Safai (1981), Balako Nu Chhapu (1983), Chamak (1984), Chi (1984), Flower Pot (1984), Chitrakatha (1986), Tintin (1987), Mini Chocolate (1987), Rasvinod (1990), Champak (1991), Tinkle (1991), Tamtam (1991), Varta Re Varta (1991).

All major Gujarati newspapers publishes supplements dedicated to children every week including Zagmag by Gujarat Samachar, Balsandesh by Sandesh, Bal Bhaskar by Divya Bhaskar.
