= Indumati Chimanlal Sheth =

Indian politician

- Born: 28 November 1906; Ahmedabad, Bombay Presidency, British India
- Died: 11 March 1985 (aged 78); Ahmedabad, Gujarat, India
- Occupation(s): Social worker, independence activist, politician, educationist
- Parents: Chimanlal Nagindas Sheth (father); Manekba (mother)
- Awards: Padma Shri (1970)

Indumati Chimanlal Sheth (28 November 1906 – 11 March 1985) was an Indian independence activist, politician, social worker, and educationist from Gujarat. Born in Ahmedabad and influenced by Mahatma Gandhi, she participated in the independence movement and later served as a deputy education minister of Bombay State and education minister of Gujarat. In 1970, she was awarded the Padma Shri for her social work.

== Biography ==
Indumati was born in Ahmedabad on 28 November 1906 to Manekba and Chimanlal Nagindas Sheth. Her father died in 1908 and had willed his fortune to be used for education which resulted in the establishment of a hostel and a school by her mother. Ambalal Sarabhai was a cousin of her father. She completed her primary education at the Government School in Ahmedabad. She matriculated in 1921 with a Chatfield prize awarded to the girl who stood first in the Bombay Presidency. She graduated in sociology from Gujarat Vidyapith in 1926 where she was influenced by Mahatma Gandhi.

She briefly worked as an honorary lecturer at Gujarat Vidyapith. She joined and taught at Sheth Chimanlal Nagindas Vidyalaya formed from the institutes founded by her mother. She participated in the non-cooperation movement in the 1920s and the Quit India Movement in 1942 for which she was imprisoned by the British authorities. She had appealed and worked for peace during the riots in Ahmedabad in 1941–42.

She established the Sammunnati Trust and Mahila Mudranalaya to uplift women through education and employment. She was also a member of Jyotisangh, a foundation for women's empowerment in Ahmedabad. She promoted swadeshi (local produce) and established the Khadi Mandir in Ahmedabad for khadi clothes promotion. She also founded the Manekba Vinayvihar in Adalaj. She had served on the committee for the feasibility study of the university in Gujarat.

She was associated with Ahmedabad unit of the Indian National Congress. She was elected as a member of Ahmedabad Municipal School Board in 1937. In 1946, she was elected to the Bombay Legislative Assembly unopposed. After independence, she served as the deputy education minister of the Bombay State from 1952 to 1960. In 1961, she established Vyayam Vidyabhavan for training physical instructors and the first fine arts college of the newly founded Gujarat state. She was also elected from Ellis Bridge constituency in 1962 and served as the Minister of Education, Social Welfare, Prohibition and Excise and Rehabilitation of Gujarat state from 1962 to 1967. She was appointed a member of the University Grants Commission in 1969.

She was awarded the Padma Shri in 1970 by the Government of India for her social work. She died on 11 March 1985 in Ahmedabad.

Gujarati writer Snehrashmi had written her biography in Gujarati, Sanskarmoorti Induben (1987).
