= Harshal Pushkarna =

Indian writer

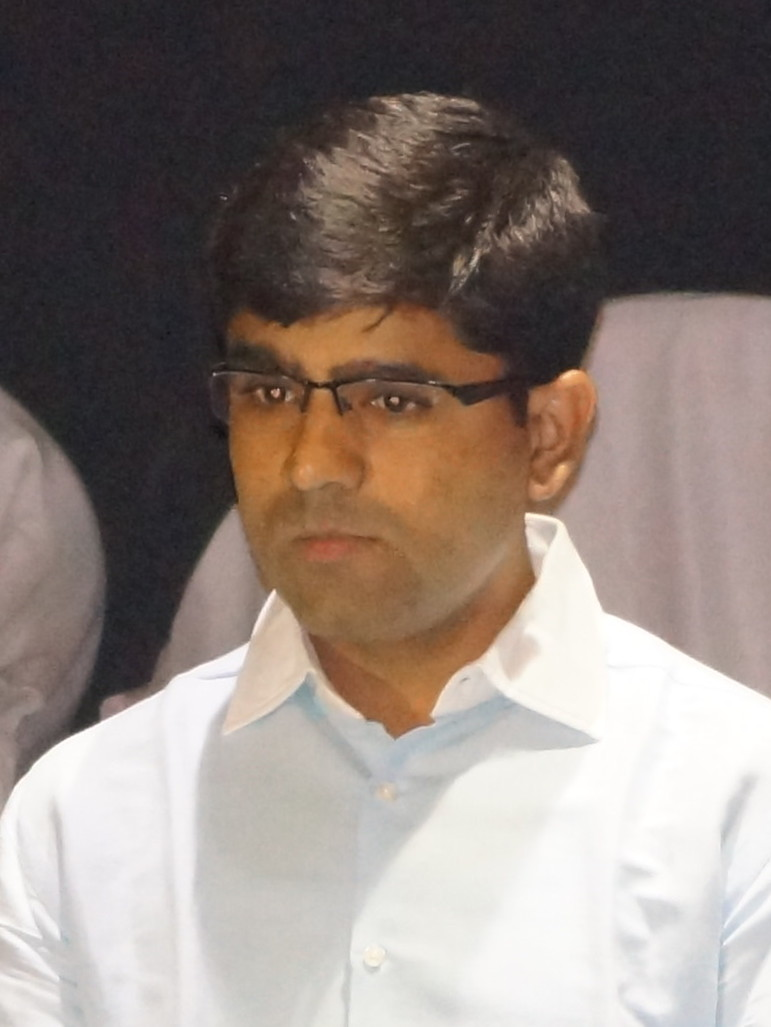
- Harshal Pushkarna
- Occupations: Journalist, Author, Publisher, Trekker. Owner : URANUS BOOKS. Publisher: GYPSY Traveller Digital App. Founder : Uranus Books. Former Executive Editor : Safari Magazine. Former columnist: Gujarat Samachar Daily.
- Years active: 1989-Present
- Parent(s): Nagendra Vijay, Daksha
- Website: www.gypsytraveller.in

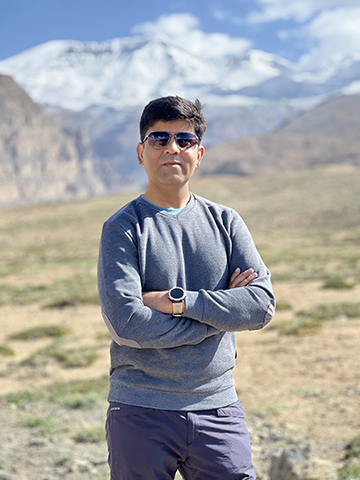
Harshal Pushkarna in 2024

Harshal Pushkarna is an Indian journalist, author, publisher and trekker. He is founder-editor of Gypsy Traveller—a digital travel encyclopedia in Hindi and Gujarati. Gypsy Traveller is a digital companion offering curated travel insights, maps, and photos, enhancing real-world journeys with contextual knowledge . He writes books on science, military, history, travel etc. He was a former executive editor and writer in Safari magazine. He is the son of Nagendra Vijay and grandson of Vijaygupta Maurya.

== Career ==
He joined Safari magazine in 1989 at the age of 14 years as it was run by his father, and worked as an office assistant for some years. Meanwhile, he completed his schooling. He also contributed his science articles for dailies like Sandesh and Mid-Day; and weekly magazines like Network in 1995–97. In 1998, he edited Citylife News — a city magazine of Ahmedabad. In the year 2000, he penned, edited and published an 88-page volume titled '20 mi sadi ni 50 ajod satyaghatnao' (Gujarati: વીસમી સદીની પ૦ અજોડ સત્યઘટનાઓ) (Fifty historical events of the 20th Century).

He has worked as an honorary scientific adviser to Science City, Gandhinagar.

He has written in-depth articles on various subjects like astronomy, defence, Information Technology, animal world, history, geography, military technology in his monthly Safari magazine.

Besides writing and editing Safari magazine, he has edited, designed and published several books and magazines written by his father Nagendra Vijay and grandfather Vijaygupta Maurya.

== Works ==
Harshal Pushkarna has authored a book titled 'AA CHHE SIACHEN' (Gujarati: આ છે સિઆચેન)(meaning 'THIS IS SIACHEN') in Gujarati language. This book attempts to analyse Siachen Glacier—the world's highest battlefield—strategically. Moreover, it is a travelogue-cum-true story in which the heroes are the lionhearted soldiers of the Indian Army. They are the living examples of adventure, sincerity, bravery, loyalty, devotion to duty and patriotism. English edition of this book has been titled 'THIS IS SIACHEN'. The same book has Marathi edition too which is titled 'HE AAHE SIACHEN' (Marathi: हे आहे सिआचेन). The Marathi book was launched in the city of Nashik at Kusumagraj Prthistan (कुसुमाग्रज प्रतिष्ठान) on 22 October 2017. Harshal Pushkarna has taken up a non-commercial initiative called Siachen Awareness Drive (Gujarati: સિઆચેન જનજાગૃતિ ઝુંબેશ) to educate the people of India about the extreme weather conditions in Siachen Glacier and the role of the brave soldiers of Indian Army in Siachen. The basic idea of Siachen Awareness Drive is twofold: (1) to ignite the spirit of patriotism in the people of India; (2) to encourage the youth to join the army and serve the nation. Moreover, Harshal Pushkarna encourages the audience to write letters, greeting cards etc. to the soldiers of the Indian Armed Forces.

Siachen Awareness Drive programs are absolutely free for all, and have successfully been done in cities like Ahmedabad, Surat, Rajkot, Vadodara, Bharuch, Bhuj, Anjar, Jamnagar, Kandivali (West) and Ghatkopar (West), Mumbai, Porbandar, Kalol, Anand, Killa Pardi (Valsad), Navsari, Junagadh, Morbi, Valsad, Nagpur (Maharashtra) etc. so far.

On April 22, 2018, Harshal Pushkarna launched yet another book—titled "PARAM VIR CHAKRA"—dedicated to the brave soldiers of the Indian Armed Forces. The book narrates, in depth, the lives and times of 21 lionhearted soldiers who were decorated with Param Vir Chakra the highest military decoration. The book has a Hindi version too with the same name.

From October, 2018 he started a Gujarati Travel magazine named Gypsy Traveller. This monthly magazine is for targeted Gujarati people who love to travel and explore new places. The print edition of the magazine is no longer available, but it is present in digital mobile app format both in Gujarati and Hindi languages with the name Gypsy Traveller.

On an auspicious occasion of Dashera, on October 25, 2020, Harshal Pushkarna launched yet another book—titled "Shaurya"—"શૌર્યઃ ભારત માતાના સપૂતોના સાહસ-સમર્પણની અમરકથા" dedicated to the operations carried out by Indian Commandos. The book narrates, in depth, the lives and operations of Commandos of Indian armed forces.

From April, 2020 he regularly started writing featured articles for a prominent Gujarati newspaper Gujarat Samachar till June 2025.

He also runs trekking organization Gypsy Outdoors.
