= Mulshankar Bhatt =

- Born: 25 June 1907; Bhavnagar
- Died: 31 October 1984 (aged 77); Bhavnagar
- Education: Music, (1927, Gujarat Vidyapith)
- Occupations: Educationist and Writer
- Spouse: Hansaben
- Children: 4

Mulshankar Mohanlal Bhatt (25 June 1907 – 31 October 1984) was Gujarati translator, biographer, children's writer and educationist from Gujarat, India. He is known for translating works of Jules Verne in Gujarati.

== Biography ==
Mulshankar Bhatt was born on 25 June 1907 at Bhavnagar (now in Gujarat), India to Mohanlal and Revaben. He completed his schooling from Dakshinamuti, Bhavnagar. He matriculated in 1921. He studied music as a main subject and Hindi-Gujarati as secondary subjects and graduated from Gujarat Vidyapith in 1927. In 1929, he joined Bombay National School in Vile Parle as a music teacher. Later he moved to Bhavnagar and joined Dakshinamurti as the teacher and rector and served from 1930 to 1939. He later joined its sister institute Gharshala as the teacher and served from 1939 to 1945. He joined Gramdakshinamurti, Ambala as the principal in 1945 and served till 1953. He taught at Lakbharti Gram Vidyapith and served as its rector and also served as principal of Lokseva Mahavidyalaya from 1953 to 1965. He retired in 1965 and continued to serve in honorary positions in several institutes such as Dakshinamurti, Lokshakti Sangathan, Gujarat Nai Talim Sangh, Gujarat Acharyakul. He died in Bhavnagar on 31 October 1984.

== Works ==
He is well known for translating several works of Jules Verne in Gujarati such as Twenty Thousand Leagues Under the Seas as Sagarsamrat, The Clipper of the Clouds as Gaganraj, Journey to the Center of the Earth as Patal Pravesh, The Mysterious Island as Sahasikoni Srishti (1934), Around the World in Eighty Days as Enshi Divasma Prithvini Pradakshina, Five Weeks in a Balloon as Baloon Pravas. He also translated Les Misérables by Victor Hugo as Dukhiyara in Gujarati. He also wrote Gaymatanu Vardan, Prabhuno Prakash.

He wrote biographies in Mahan Musafaro and Nansen. He edited articles of Swami Anand as Dharatini Arati (1977). He translated The Power of Darkness, a play by Leo Tolstoy as Andharana Seemada.

He had studied child psychology and worked on theories of education. He wrote several works on education and children such as Shikshakni Nishtha ane Drashti, Kelvani Vichar, Gharma Balmandir, Balako Tofan Kem Kare Chhe?, Gandhiji- Ek Kelvanikar, Balakone Varta Kem Kahishu?.

== Personal life ==
He married Hansa and had four children: Bakul, Vikram, Urmila and Meena.

== See also ==
- List of Gujarati-language writers
