= Manubhai Pancholi =

Indian politician

- Born: 15 October 1914; Panchashiya, Morbi district, Gujarat, India
- Died: 29 August 2001 (aged 86); Sanosara, Bhavnagar, Gujarat
- Occupations: Novelist, author, educationist and politician
- Spouse: Vijayaben Patel (died 1995)
- Writing career
- Pen name: Darshak
- Language: Gujarati
- Notable awards: Ranjitram Suvarna Chandrak (1964); Sahitya Akademi Award to Gujarati Writers (1975); Moortidevi Award (1987); Padma Bhusan (1991); Jamnalal Bajaj Award (1996); Saraswati Samman (1997)

Manubhai Pancholi also known by his pen name Darshak, was a Gujarati language novelist, author, educationist and politician from Gujarat, India. He participated in the Indian independence movement and held several offices after independence.

== Biography ==
Manubhai Pancholi was born on 15 October 1914 at Panchashiya village in Morbi district, Gujarat, India. He completed his primary education from Tithwa Lunsar. He left study to participate in Salt Satyagraha in 1930 when he was studying at Wankaner. He was jailed in Sabarmati, Nasik and Visapur. He started his career as a rector in educational institute, Dakshinamurti at Bhavnagar in 1932 and later joined as a professor in Gramdakshinamurt, Ambala in 1938. He was also arrested during Quit India Movement in 1942 was jailed at Bhavnagar. He served as education minister of Bhavnagar State in 1948. He co-founded Lokbharti Gramvidyapith institute with Nanabhai Bhatt in 1953 at Sanosara. He married Vijayaben Patel, a daughter of Patidar family from Varad village of Bardoli, who predeceased him on 25 April 1995.

He was a member of Gujarat Legislative Assembly from 1967 to 1971 and served as an education minister in 1970. He was arrested during the emergency in 1975. He served as the president of Gujarati Sahitya Parishad from 1981 to 1983. He also served as the chairman of the Gujarat Sahitya Akademi from 1991 to 1998.

He died on 29 August 2001 at Sanosara, Bhavnagar, Gujarat following kidney ailment.

== Works ==
Pancholi is regarded as one of the greatest novelists in Gujarati literature. He was influenced by Mahatma Gandhi, and followed Gandhian thinking and ways in his writings and life as well.

The novels Pancholi has written include: Jher To Pidha Chhe Jani Jani (1952), Socrates (1974), Bandhan ane Mukti (1938), Bandeeghar (1939), Deepnirvan (1944) and Prem ane Pooja (1939), among which, Jher To Pidha Chhe Jani Jani and Socrates are regarded as classic. Dipnirvan is a historical novel about the revolt against Magadh in ancient India.

His plays have been collected and published in: Paritran (1967), Adharaso Sattavan (1935), Jaliawala (1934) and Antim Adhyaya (1983). Mari Vachankatha (1969) and Vagishwari Na Karnaphoolo (1963) are collections of his critical articles. His Apano Varso ane Vaibhav (1953), Triveni Tirth (1955), Dharmachakra Parivartan (1956), Ramayan No Marma (1963), Lokshahi (1973), Mahabharat No Marma (1978) and Sarvodaya Ane Shikshan (1974) deal with different aspects of Indian culture.

His classic adapted in the Gujarati film, Zer To Pidhan Jani Jani (1972) directed by Upendra Trivedi. His novel Socrates was translated into Hindi by Sushila Joshi as Sukrat in 1987.

== Awards ==
He received Ranjitram Suvarna Chandrak in 1964, Sahitya Akademi Award for Socrates in 1975 and Bharatiya Jnanpith Moortidevi Award for Jher To Pidha Chhe Jani Jani in 1987. He was awarded Padma Bhushan in 1991 for his work in public affairs. He also received Saraswati Samman in 1997 for his book Kurukshetra and Jamnalal Bajaj Award in 1996.

== See also ==
- List of Gujarati-language writers
