= Bakor Patel =

- Bakor Patel depicted as an anthropomorphic goat reading newspaper and wearing paghadi, kurta and dhoti
- First appearance: 1936
- Last appearance: 1955
- Created by: Hariprasad Vyas
- Publisher: Gandiv by Gandiv Sahitya Mandir, Surat
- Artists: Tansukh, Mansukh, V. Ramanuj
- Language: Gujarati

In-universe information
- Species: Goat
- Gender: Male
- Occupation: Businessman
- Spouse: Shakri Patlani
- Significant others: Vaghjibhai Vakil, Hathishankar Dhamdhamiya, Untadiya Vaidya
- Children: No
- Official website: www.bakorpatel.com

Bakor Patel is children's literature character created by Hariprasad Vyas for talking animal stories. The stories were published in Gandiv, a children's biweekly in Gujarati language by Gandiv Sahitya Mandir, Surat, Gujarat, India. The humorous stories about Bakor Patel first appeared in 1936 and continued till 1955. The stories included other anthropomorphic characters including his wife, Shakri Patlani. The stories were accompanied with an illustration and title printed in typical typography; drawn by two Surat based artist brothers, Tansukh and Mansukh. The character became the icon of Gujarati children's literature and was later adapted into a children's play.

== Characters and story ==
Bakor Patel is a goat depicted as middle aged businessman living in Bombay with his goat wife Shakri Patlani. He owns a trading business in Bombay that works with firms in Japan. He lives an upper middle class life in 1940-50s and owns bungalow and car. His friends include other anthropomorphic animals like a tiger, Vaghjibhai Vakil as a lawyer; an elephant, Hathibhai Dhamdhamiya; a camel, Untadiya Doctor as a doctor; a pundit, Timu Pandit; Jiraf Joshi; Bankubhai and several others. Sometimes spouses of the characters and some female characters like Khushaldoshi are depicted.

The stories take place in Bombay during the 1940s and 1950s. Bakor Patel is depicted as a social family person who travels for business and enjoy his time with family and friends back home. He has a mature relationship with his wife, Shakri Patlani. He seeks small adventures in his regular life and tries to experience new things that often go wrong in the end. Yet, he joyfully accepts failures of his adventures and continues on to the next one. His family and friends accompany in his adventures and shares the delight.

== Style and history ==
The Gandiv, a children's biweekly in Gujarati language published by Gandiv Sahitya Mandir, Surat was started in August 1925 by Natwarlal Malvi. The biweekly continued till 1973.

Hariprasad Vyas wrote these light humorous stories on the suggestion of Natwarlal Malvi. The chief characters Bakor Patel was named after Bakor Mukhi from his maternal family and Shakri Patlani was modified from his wife Bakri. He visualised the characters as a goat and subsequently other characters were inspired by other animals with their usual characteristics. Natwarlal Malvi had discussed with Vyas about children's stories from the Russian literature which are satire on human society. Malvi had known this from Red Virtue (1933) by British journalist Ella Winter. The stories are social in nature and depicted commons social life of upper middle class in the cities of that time. The stories were printed in big types accompanied with an illustration mostly in black and white and title printed in typical typography which were drawn by two Surat based artist brothers, Tansukh and Mansukh.

Later the stories were reprinted in large format children's books accompanied with drawings in colors. When the illustration were redrawn by V. Ramanuj for new editions, they were slightly different from the original art.

The stories, selected by Mahendra Meghani and translated in English by Piyush Joshi, were published by the National Book Trust in 2009.

== Reception and influence ==
The stories were popular among children as well as admired by adults when they were first appeared in biweekly. They are still popular across Gujarat and is considered as an icon of children's literature in Gujarati language. The success of the stories resulted in several other stories appearing in Gujarati children's literature with anthropomorphic characters like Galbo Shiyal by Ramanlal Soni. The stories influenced writers like Taarak Mehta whose humorous weekly column Duniya ne Oondha Chashma has similar social background.

== Adaptation ==
Bakor Patel, a children's play based on the character was produced by the Indian National Theatre, Mumbai.

== Books ==
Some of the books are:

- Bakor Patel : Aade Bakade
- Bakor Patel : Aasmanma!
- Bakor Patel : Andhale Behru
- Bakor Patel : April Fool
- Bakor Patel : Chamatkar Tya Namaskar
- Bakor Patel : Dholkun Dholyun!
- Bakor Patel : Doctor nay Doctor
- Bakor Patel : Gammat Par Gammat
- Bakor Patel : Goyam Pindam
- Bakor Patel : Jagjo Re!
- Bakor Patel : Lyo Leta Jao
- Bakor Patel : Papadiyo Jang!
- Bakor Patel : Raj nu Gaj
- Bakor Patel : Ran Medane
- Bakor Patel : Sampetara
- Bakor Patel : Tachakiyu
- Bakor Patel : Tran Trekhad?
- Bakor Patel : Ujani
- Bakor Patel na Chhabarda
- Bakor Patel na Parakramo
- Bakor Patel ni Gammato
- Bakor Patel ni Garbado
- Bakor Patel ni Kahanio
- Bakor Patel ni Kathao
- Bakor Patel ni Vaato
