= Harikrishna Pathak =

Indian poet, editor and writer (1938–2025)

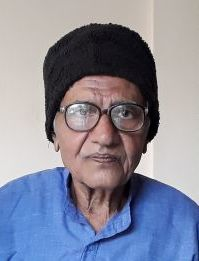
- Pathak at his home in Gandhinagar, January 2018
- Born: 5 August 1938; Botad, Bhavnagar State, Western India States Agency, British India
- Died: 28 March 2025 (aged 86); Gandhinagar, Gujarat, India
- Education: Bachelor of Science
- Alma mater: Gujarat University
- Occupations: Poet, short story writer writer, editor
- Spouse: Chandrika (m. 1961)
- Writing career
- Language: Gujarati
- Notable works: Sooraj Kadach Uge (1974); Adva Pachisi (1984)
- Notable awards: Kumar Chandrak (1967)

Signature
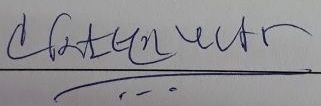

Harikrishna Pathak (5 August 1938 – 28 March 2025) was an Indian Gujarati-language poet, short story writer, editor and children's writer from Gujarat.

== Life and career ==
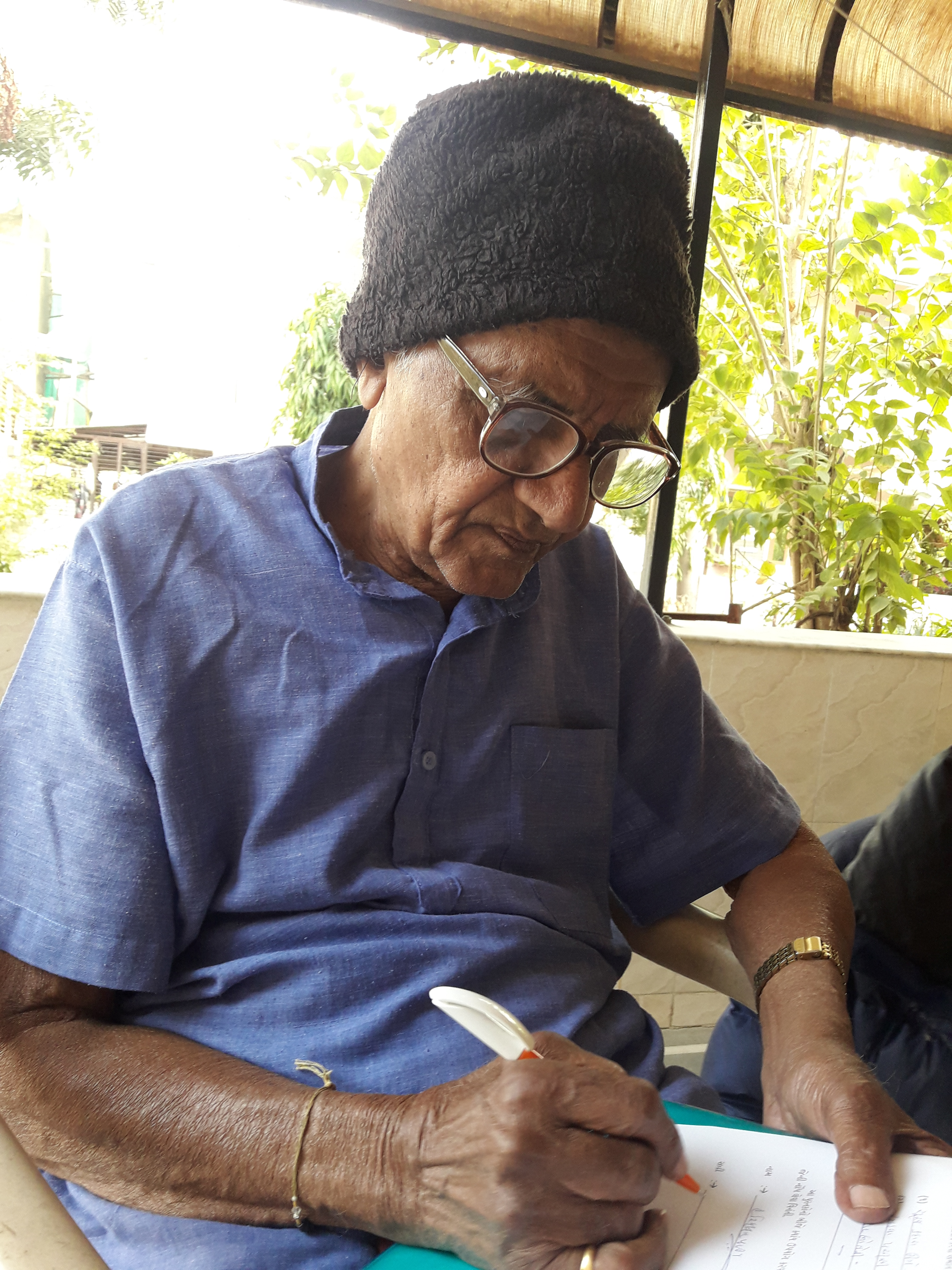
Harikrishna Pathak writing at his home, 2018

Pathak was born on 5 August 1938 at Botad (now in Gujarat, India) to Monghiben and Ramchandra. His family was from Bholad village in Ahmedabad district. He matriculated in 1956. He completed his B.Sc. from Gujarat University in 1961. He worked as a teacher at Songadh near Bhavnagar in 1961–62. In 1963, he joined Department of Revenues, Government of Gujarat as an assistant. He was later promoted as the divisional officer and later retired as the deputy secretary. He managed literary groups such as Mijlas and Brihaspatisabha for years. He also served as a vice president of Gujarati Sahitya Parishad. He was also painter, sketcher and singer.

=== Personal life and death ===
Pathak married Chandrika in 1961 at Bhavnagar and had six children.

Pathak died in Gandhinagar on 28 March 2025, at the age of 86.

== Works ==
Harikrishna Pathak had experimented with several genres of literature. His first work, a satire, Natakno Takhto was published in Chandani while his first poem was published in Kumar. Sooraj Kadach Uge (1974) was his first poetry collection which had 82 poems including metrical poetry, sonnets, songs, ghazals and free verse. It has traditional as well as experimental poems. Halavi Hawane Pankhe (2005), Tapu and Jalna Padgha are his other poetry collections. Adva Pachisi (1984) has parody poetry on human nature delivered through fictional character Advo. It has shades of burlesque.

Mor Banglo (1988) and Natubhaine To Jalsa Chhe (2008) are his story collections. Galine Nakethi (1993) is his collection of criticism. Nagar Vase Chhe (1978) has selected poems from Brihaspatisabha edited by him. He also edited Gujarat Kavita Chayan (1994, 1996) as well as co-edited Swatantryottar Gujarati Geet Sanchay, Gurjar Navalika Chayan, Gurjar Adhunik Vivechan and Manubhai Trivedi - Sarod (2008). Aapni Yadi has poems of Kalapi selected by him. Raina Phool (2004) is his travelogue.

He contributed to children's literature also. Koinu Kaik Khovay Chhe (1981) is a collection of children's poetry. Dostarini Vato (1993) is a collection of children's stories. Gulabi Arasni Laggi (1979) is a collection of teenage experiences initially serialized in Nutan Gujarat. Hallo-Fallo (2005) is also his work on children's literature.

== Awards ==
Pathak received Kumar Chandrak (1967), Chandrashekhar Thakkur Prize (1973), Critics Award (1984), Jayant Pathak Poetry Prize (1993), Narmad Suvarna Chandrak (1993, for Jalna Padgha). He was awarded by Gujarat Sahitya Akademi also.

== See also ==
- List of Gujarati-language writers
