= Dinkar Joshi =

Gujarati author from India

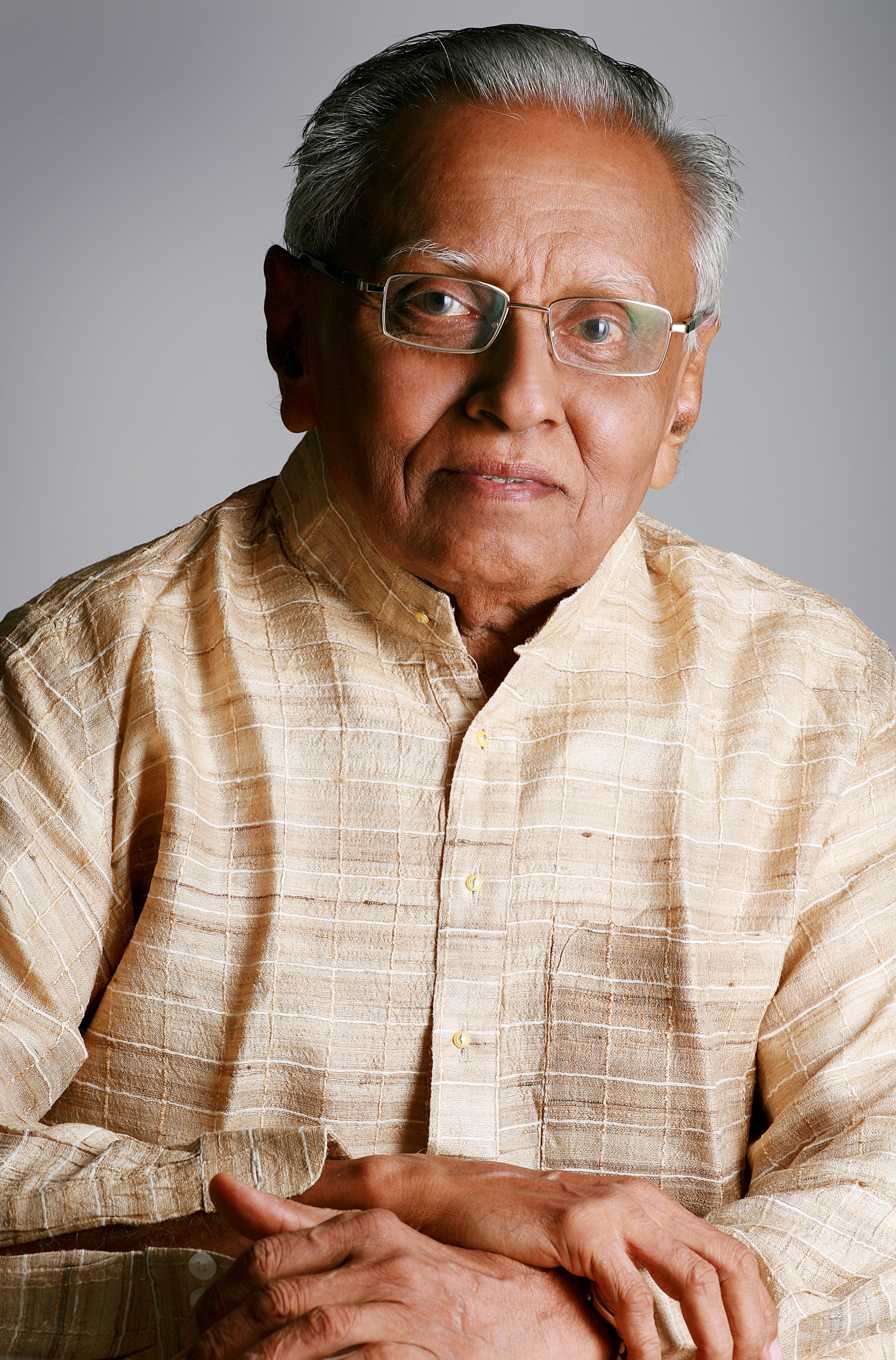
- Born: 30 June 1937 (age 89); Nagdhaniba village, Bhavnagar district, Gujarat
- Education: Bachelor of Arts (History and Politics)
- Alma mater: Gujarat University
- Occupations: author (1954-), banking (1959-1995)
- Spouse: Hansaben
- Children: Nikhil, Akhil
- Parent(s): Lilavati and Maganlal Joshi
- Website: Official website

Dinkar Joshi (born 30 June 1937) is an Indian Gujarati-language writer from India. He has written more than 160 books including novels, short story collections, essay collections and columns.

== Life ==
Dinkar Joshi was born on 30 June 1937 in Bhadi Bhandaria village of Bhavnagar district to Lilavati and Maganlal Joshi. His family belonged to Nagdhaniba village. He completed his Bachelor of Arts in 1963 with history and politics from Gujarat University. He started writing in 1950 and published his first short story in 1954. He worked in banking sector from 1959 till his voluntary retirement in 1995. He was principal of Staff Training College of the bank when retired.

His novels were serialized in weekly supplements of Gujarati and Hindi dailies like Gujarat Samachar and Jagran. His novel Prakash no Padchhayo was simultaneously serialized in the Sunday supplements of three Gujarati dailies; Samkaleen, Jansatta and Loksatta.

He married Hansaben in 1963. He challenged the claim about number of Shlokas in Bhagvad Geeta by Dr. Vedavyas of Andhra Pradesh and proved it with an example.

== Works ==
Dinkar Joshi has written more than 156 books in his six decade long literary career. He has written 45 novels on social, historical, rural and ancient subjects. He has written many essays and topical sketches. He has edited and translated several books in Gujarati. He has done extensive study and research on Krishna and Mahatma Gandhi. He has studied the Ramayana, Mahabharata, Vedas and Upanishads and has written extensively on these subjects. He has written several biographical novels including on poet Narmad; Harilal Gandhi, the eldest son of Mahatma Gandhi; Muhammad Ali Jinnah, Rabindranath Tagore, Gautam Buddha, Sardar Patel and Lev Tolstoy. Some of his novels have been adapted into Gujarati films.

His novel Prakash no Padchhayo, written on the life of Harilal Gandhi, has been dramatized in English, Gujarati, Marathi, Hindi and several Indian languages. This adapted play by Feroz Abbas Khan, Mahatma versus Gandhi was staged during the commemorative function held to celebrate Gandhi's anniversary at Columbia University in New York, organised by the Indo-American Arts Council.

His novels include Door Door Aara (1963), Jane Ajane (1963), Tan Zankhe Man Roy (1965), Matsyavedh (1966), Adithan Roop (1967), Shesh - Ashesh (1969), Aganpathari (1972), Tarasyan Pagalan Tran (1974), Yakshaprashna (1974), Asahya (1976), Satyano Chahero (1977), Khelo Re Khel Khurshina (1978), Kankuna Suraj Aathamya (1979), Suraj Dhima Tapo (1981), Barafni Chadar (1981), Sachan Motino Charo (1982), Aa Pag Nicheno Rasto (1982), Agiyarmi Disha (1982), Aapane Kyank Malyan Chhie (1983), Triji Aankh (1983), 35 Up 36 Down (1983), Garvun Roop Varvi Chhaya (2005), Ek Tukado Aakashno (1984) based on life of Narmad, Radhani Vedana (1984), Saranama Vinanun Ghar (1986), Jamana Pagno Angutho (1987), Sarpsatra (1987), Shyam Ekvar Aavone Aangane (1988), Prakash no Padachhayo (1988) based on life of Harilal Gandhi, Kale Surajne Kahejo Ke (1989), Kurusabha (1990), Alpaviram (1991), Vastraharan (1992), Amrutyatra (1994), Kalpurush (1995), Ekada Vagarna Mindan (1997), Sami Sanjna Padachhaya (1999), Dariyathi Dariya Sudhi (2001), Pratinayak (2002), Amrutpanthano Yatri (2003), Ahin Koi Nathi (2005), Prashnapradeshni Pele Paar (2008), Ayodhyano Ravan Ane Lankana Ram (2010), Mahamanav Sardar (2014), Gaikal Vinani Avatikal (2016). He coauthored novel Parivartan (1991).

His short stories collections are Anradhar (1964), Vanpravesh (1965), Tarafadat (1969), Ek Lawaris Shab (1974), Ek Vaheli Sawarnun Sapanun (1980), Nam Badalvani Ramat (1986), Dinkar Joshini Shreshtha Vartao (1988), Bandhi Muththino Khalipo (1990), Nava Varasnun Panchang (1995), Ek Hato Manas (1997), Sarvalani Badbaki (2003), Vagadanu Phool (2012), Ekvar Evun Banyun (2016).

He edited several works including Yaad (1954-64 ni Pratinidhi Varatao) (1987), Kavyarasaswad (1987), Venibhaino Varta Vaibhav (1991), Rangnagarno Rasiyo Nagar (a memorial book on Venibhai Purohit, 1991), Saravaiyun (commemorative book on centenary of Chandulal Selarka, 1992), Aambavadiyun (articles of Swami Anand, 1996), Amaratvel (articles of Swami Anand, 1996), Ugamani Dishano Ujas (Letter correspondences of Swami Anand, 1996), Dhodhamar (Letter correspondences of Swami Anand, 1996), Krushnacharitra (Bankimchandra, 2000), Ekakshari Shabdakosh (2003), Samay Chintan (articles of Kakasaheb Kalelkar, 2008), Spandan (articles of Bhagwatikumar Sharma, 2011) and twenty volumes of Mahabharata (2010) translated into Gujarati.

He translated Punjabi Ekanki in 1978. His other works are, Tulasi Is Sansar Men (1986), Tachali Aangalie Govardhan (1989), Manas Taran Roop Anek (1991), Ek Najar Aa Taraf (1992), Krushnam Vande Jagadgurum (1990), Mahabharatma Manavdarshan (1991), Ardhya (1994), Abhishek (1994), Aachaman (1994), Anjali (1994), Archana (1994), Mara Vidhya Guruo (1994), Tulsidal (1995), Darbhasan (1997), Nadabrahma (1997), Kalpataru (1997), Halvu Ful Aakash (1997), Satya Taraf Do Jatun Asatya (1997), Dharatinum Sarnamun (1997), Bodhivruksha (1997), Mahabharatman Matruvandana (1997), Mahabharatman Pitruvandana (1997), Suranjo Chhadidar (1997), Mahabharat : Ek Darshan (1999), Pratah Vandana (1999), Paramno Panth (1999), Adrashyani Aaradhana (1999), Dishaoni Pele Paar (1999), Ramayanman Patravandana (2001), Mahalakshmina Mandirman (2001), Dinkar Joshini Vicharyatra (2004), Latamandap (2004), Parijat (2004), Bharatiya Sanskrutina Sarjako (2004) with Yogesh Patel, Shri Krushnanun Sarnamun (2005), Gandhino Yagna Dandiyatra (2005), Mumbaina Vikasman Gujrationun Yogadan (2005), Ramayan, Mahabharat, Bhagawat Chintan Ane Manan (2006), Chakrathi Charkha Sudhi (2006), Sukhanun Sarnamun (2006), Akshrani Aakashganga (2007), Dikari Etle Tulsikyaro (2007), Tyare Ane Atyare - 1947 to 2007 (2008), Ame Ane Aapane (2009), Manasnun Kai Kahevay Nahin (2009), Manase Mangelun Vardan (2009), Mrutyu Aa Paar Ke Pele Paar (2009), Najaronajar (2009), Hun Mane Joun Chhun (2009), Kalni Kasotie Gandhijini Geeta "Hind Swaraj" (2009), Shadaripu (2011), Shunyama Shabda Tun (2012), Sohamano Suryasta (2012), Gandhi Sardar ane Jinha Vyaktidarshan (2013), Matini Sugandh (2013) and X-ray Apana Sahuno (2015).

His several works are translated into other languages totaling fifty eight books including in English, German, Kannad, Marathi, Malayalam, Telugu, Tamil, Bangala, Oriya and Hindi languages. His books translated into English are Glimpses Of Indian Culture, An Eternal Journey, Quaid Azam Mohmmad Ali Jinnah, Mahatma Vs Gandhi, Sardar, The Sovereign Saint.

== Recognition ==
He is conferred with five Gujarat State Sahitya Akademi awards. He is awarded an honorary degree of D.Litt. by Shri Jagdishprasad Jhabarmal Tibrewala University, Rajasthan. He received Sahitya Gaurav Puraskar in 2017.

== Selected bibliography ==
- Dinkar Joshi (1 January 2007). Mahatma Vs Gandhi. Jaico Publishing House. ISBN 978-81-7992-700-7.
- Joshi, Dinkar; Patel, Yogesh (1 January 2005). Glimpses of Indian Culture. Star Publications. ISBN 978-81-7650-190-3.

== See also ==
- List of Gujarati-language writers
