= Neeta Ramaiya =

Gujarati poet and children's writer

- Born: 14 July 1941 (age 85); Morbi, British India (now in Gujarat, India)
- Education: M.A. Ph.D.
- Occupations: Poet, children's writer, translator
- Writing career
- Language: Gujarati

Signature
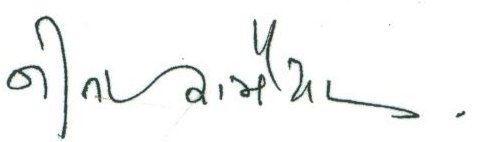

Neeta Ramaiya is Gujarati poet, children's writer and translator from India.

== Life ==
Neeta Ramaiya was born on 14 July 1941 at Morbi (now in Gujarat, India). She matriculated in 1957. She completed her B.A. in English in 1960 and M.A. in 1962. She taught at M. G. S. M. College, Matunga, Bombay (now Mumbai) from 1962 to 1966. She also worked as a Director of Centre for Canadian Studies, SNDT Women's University and also served as Professor Emeritus.

== Works ==
She is a feminist poet challenging patriarchy, especially in her poetry collection Dakhla Tarike Stree (1994). Her poetry also reflects emotions of female heart as well as confident voice demanding equality and justice. Her other poetry collections are Shabdane Raste (1989), Te Jalpradesh Chhe (1998), Iran deshe (2002), Rang Dariyo Ji Re (2008), Mari Hathelima (2009), Jasudna Phool (2013).

She has also contributed in children's literature. Dhamachakdi (1986) and Khil Khil Khil Turuk Turuk (1998) are her collections of children's poetry. Tane Paraniye Podhadu (2006) is her collection of lullabies. Lalkunwarni Kukre Kook (1998) is a children's story.

She published translations of some of Canadian poet Margaret Atwood's poetry in 1991 under Kavyavishwa Shreni. Panu Rah Juve Chhe (1991) is her translation of Canadian poems. Canadian Shabdakhand Bharatna Pravase (1995), Streesukta (2002, Marathi poems), Shakespeare na Bolta Patro (2003), Ek Ajanyo Mari Navma (2007, story), Iran Deshno Sanskrutik Dhabkar: Parsian Kahevato (2007) are her translations.

== See also ==
- List of Gujarati-language writers
