= Yoseph Macwan =

Gujarati writer from India (1940–2022)

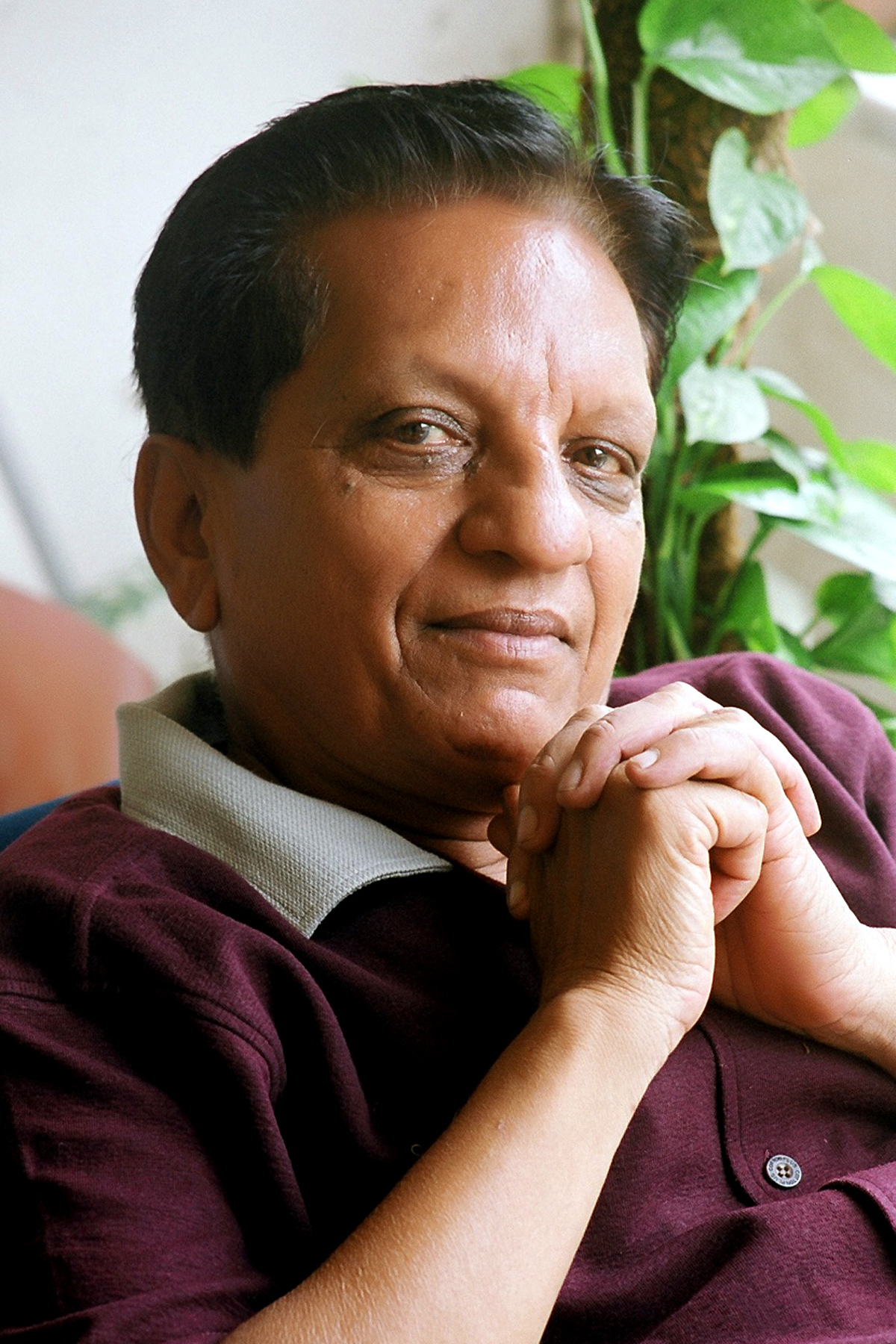
- Macwan in 2010
- Born: Yoseph Philip Macwan; 20 December 1940; Ahmedabad, Gujarat
- Died: 25 December 2022 (aged 82); Ahmedabad, Gujarat, India
- Education: Master of Arts
- Alma mater: Gujarat University
- Occupations: Poet, literary critic
- Spouse: Sabina (m. 1973)
- Writing career
- Language: Gujarati
- Notable awards: Kumar Suvarna Chandrak (2013)

Signature
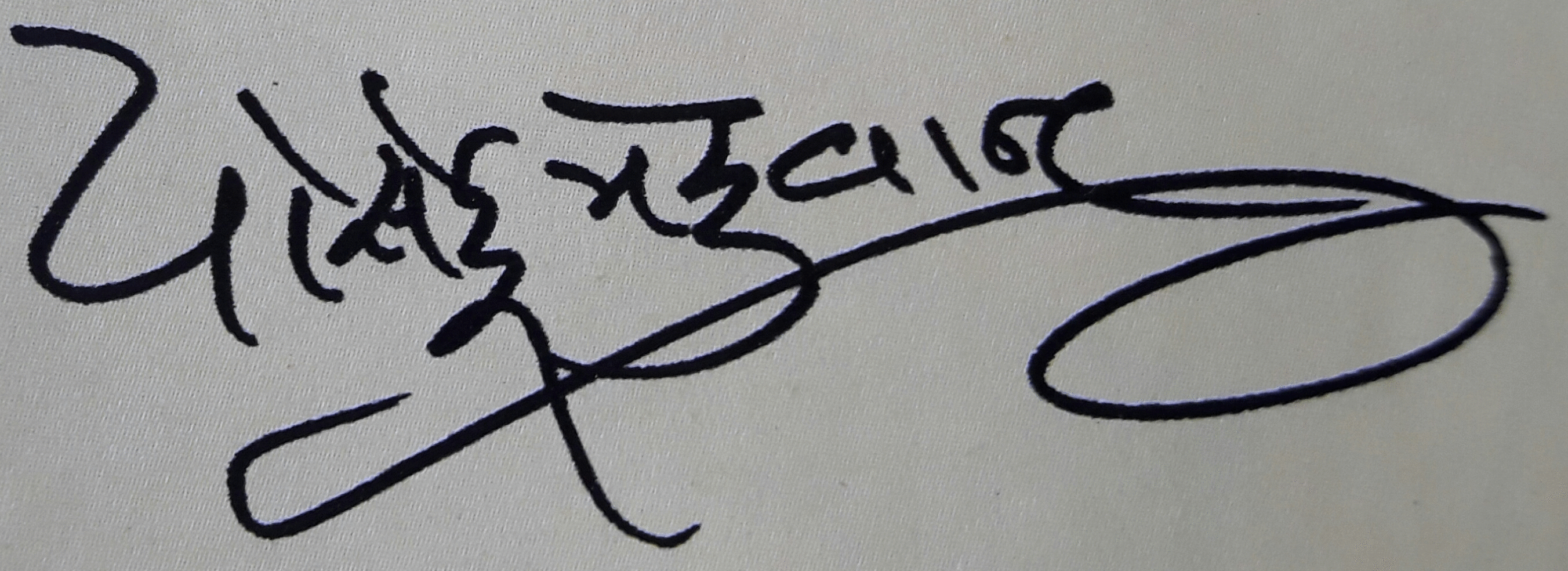

Yoseph Philip Macwan (20 December 1940 – 25 December 2022) was an Indian Gujarati-language poet and literary critic from Gujarat, India. He was also known for his contribution in Gujarati children's literature.

== Biography ==
Yoseph Macwan was born on 20 December 1940 at Ahmedabad to Philip and Mariyam Macwan. His family belonged to Malawada village near Nadiad. Due to family constraints, he worked as a helper in Ahmedabad Municipal Transport Service after SSC but he was underpaid thus he decided to continue studies. He completed B.A. in Gujarati in 1968, M.A. in 1970 and B.Ed. in 1975 from Gujarat University. He regularly attended Budh Sabha. He joined Sheth Chimanlal Nagindas Vidyalaya, Ahmedabad as a teacher in 1963 and served there until his retirement. He ran Vaishakhi bimonthly for three years.

Macwan died on 25 December 2022 in Ahmedabad.

== Works ==
His first work Aravata was published in Sanskriti magazine. Swagat (1969) was his first poetry collection which included sonnets, metrical poetry and geet. His other poetry collections are Soorajno Hath (1983), Alakhna Asawar (1994) and Avajna X-Ray (2000).

He has contributed in Gujarati children's literature. His children's poetry collections are Tofan (1999), Ding Dong-Ding Dong (1998) while children's stories include Vah Re Varta Vah! (1994). His birds related poetry includes Pranibagni Ser and Kalrav (1990).

Kan Hoy Te Sambhale (2001) and Samvedanna Sal Ane Val (2004) are his essay collections. Halva Hathe (1997) has humorous essays. He wrote criticism also which is published in Cross Ane Kavi (1987), Shabdagoshthi, Shabdani Arpar (2008), Shabdane Ajvale (2007) and Shabdasahvas (2008). Stotrasamhita (1980) is his metrical translation of the Biblical alleluias which are sung in several churches of Gujarat.

== Awards ==
His first poetry collection Swagat was awarded by Government of Gujarat. His children's poetry was awarded by Gujarati Sahitya Akademi while his children's stories were awarded by Gujarati Sahitya Parishad. He received Jayant Pathak Poetry Award for Soorajno Hath in 1983. He received Kumar Suvarna Chandrak in 2013.

== Personal life ==
He married twice; 1960-67 and in 1973 to Sabina aka Surbhi. They had two children.
