= Hariprasad Vyas =

- Born: Hariprasad Manirai Vyas; June 16, 1909; Bodka, Vadodara, Gujarat, India
- Died: 13 July 1980 (aged 76); San Jose, California, U.S.
- Education: matriculation
- Occupations: humourist, children's writer
- Writing career
- Language: Gujarati

Hariprasad Maniray Vyas (16 June 1909 – 13 July 1980) was a Gujarati humorist and author of children's literature.

== Life ==
Hariprasad Vyas was born on 16 June 1909 in Bodka village near Vadodara, Gujarat. He passed matriculation in 1921 in Vadodara. He served as Manager in the office of Zenith Life and General Insurance from 1925 to his retirement. He died on 13 July 1980 in San Jose, California, US.

== Works ==
Hariprasad Vyas created several popular fictional characters for children's literature in Gujarati language including Bakor Patel, Shakri Patlani, Vaghjibhai Vakil, Untadiya Doctor, Hathishankar Dhamdhamiya, Bhotvashankar. He wrote humorous stories of Bakor Patel in children's biweekly Gandiv published by Gandiv Sahitya Madir, Surat from 1936 to 1955. These stories are later published as story collections. His works include Bakor Patel (30 works), Bhejabaj Bhagabhai (6 works), Hathishankar Dhamdhamiya (6 books), Bhotvashankarna Parakramo, Gundar Sundar (6 works), Balvinod, Hasyavinod, Anandvinod. He also published ten collections of children's plays under Chalo Bhajavie series. He also wrote several humorous essays collected under various titles; Hasyazarna, Hasyakillol, Hasyavasant, Kathahasya, Patnini Shodhama, Andhale Behru, Pothimana Ringana.

== See also ==
- List of Gujarati-language writers
