= Nanabhai Bhatt (educationist) =

Indian politician

Nrusinhprasad Kalidas Bhatt
- Born: 11 November 1882; Bhavnagar, Bhavnagar State, British India
- Died: 31 December 1961 (age 79); Bhavnagar, Gujarat, India
- Known for: Education, Reforms, Rural Welfare, Dakshinamurti, Lokbharti

Nanabhai Bhatt (born Nrusinhprasad Kalidas Bhatt; 11 November 1882 – 31 December 1961) was an Indian educator, writer, thinker and Indian independence activist. Bhatt was a contemporary of educators Gijubhai Badheka and Harbhai Trivedi. The three worked to advance rural education. Bhatt died on 31 December 1961. He has written a number of books on Indian Cultural Heritage which include Ramayana na Patro, Mahabharat Na Patro, Mahabharat Ni Akhyaikayo 1-2, Bhagawat kathao. Ghadatar and Chanatar is his autobiography.

== Early life ==
Bhatt was born on 11 November 1882, in Bhavnagar. He attended Samaldas Arts College there, where he completed his M.A.

== Career ==
He started his career as a principal at a high school in Mahuva, Bhavnagar, Gujarat, and became a professor at Shamaldas College. From 1908 to 1915, the concept and fulfilment of Dakshinamurti Vidhyarthi Bhavan, a residential educational institute, was gradually accomplished. The institute was formally established in 1910.

Bhatt was a thinker and reformer. He became Vice Chancellor at Gujarat Vidyapith, and during 1925-28 as Vice-Chancellor of Gujarat Vidyapith. In 1938, he established Gram Dakshinamurti, an Institute of Basic Education at Ambala, Sihor Taluka, targeting education in rural areas.

=== Lokbharti ===
He became Minister of Education in Saurashtra state in 1948. In 1953, he founded Lokbharti, a university for rural villagers who otherwise lacked access to higher education, in Sanosara, Gujarat. Lokbharti is based on the vision and message of Mahatma Gandhi of a strong and self-sufficient rural India.

Bhatt founded other educational institutions such as Dakshinamurti Vidyarthi Bhavan / Dakshinamurti Vinay Mandir - Bhavnagar, Gram Dakshinamurti - Ambala.

== Philanthropy and other works ==
Bhatt devoted his life to the welfare of rural communities and education. He wrote and published books and publications from 1920 to 1959, focusing on education, religion, humanity, social science, history, self help and character development. He remained an active 'Satyagrahi' and a freedom fighter for the Indian independence movement. He was arrested multiple times for this activity. According to the famous Gujarati writer Manubhai Pancholi, Bhatt had a good knowledge of Sanskrit classical texts such as the Upanishads. A member of Rajya Sabha from 1954 to 1957, Bhatt was awarded Padma Shri in 1960 for "Social Work".
