= Miya Fuski =

- Miya Fuski Vinodmala character
- Miya Fuski (left) and Tabha Bhatt in their typical attire
- First appearance: 1945
- Created by: Jivram Joshi
- Publisher: Zen Opus
- Language: Gujarati

In-universe information
- Gender: Male
- Spouse: Bibi
- Significant others: Tabha Bhatt, Dala Sheth

Miya Fuski is a fictional character created by Jivram Joshi for children's literature in Gujarati language. He is mostly accompanied by his friend, Tabha Bhatt. Both characters were inspired by the people of Kashi during Joshi's stay there. Joshi wrote more than thirty stories on the characters. They became popular and were later adapted into plays, TV series and a film.

== Origin and history ==
Jivram Joshi was a children's literature author of Gujarati language who created several popular fiction characters. Joshi was an editor of Zagmag, a children's weekly in Gujarati published by Gujarat Samachar. In 1945, he started publishing the stories of Miya Fuski in it which continued for two generations. He wrote more than thirty stories on Miya Fuski.

Jivram Joshi has described the origin of the characters,

When I was living in Kashi, I was inspired to create a character of Miyan Fuski after watching a Miyan [a Muslim person]. A very funny and very thin Miyan named Ali was living in a house behind a temple in Narsinh Mohalla in Kashi. He had a cart. He always laughed and made others laugh. His funny nature and attire inspired me to create the character of Fattu Miyan. Thin and bearded Fattu Miya used to wear lehenga and waistcoat. And a cap on head. This Miyan had a peculiar thing about his nature that he boasted that he is brave but inwardly he was timid. Thus joined Fuski [ Timid in Gujarati ] with Miya and wrote a story.

— Jivram Joshi (Note: English translation. Original statement in Gujarati: "હું કાશીમાં રહેતો હતો ત્યારે એક મિયાંને જોઈને મને મિયાં ફુસકીનું પાત્ર ઘડવાની પ્રેરણા મળી હતી. કાશીમાં નરસિંહ ચોતરા મહોલ્લામાં મંદિરની પાછળ આવેલા ઘરમાં અલી નામના અત્યંત રમૂજી સ્વભાવના દૂબળાપાતળા મિયાં રહેતા હતા. એ એક્કો ચલાવતા. હંમેશાં હસતા અને બીજાને ખડખડાટ હસાવતા. એમનો મશ્કરો સ્વભાવ અને દેખાવ જોઈને મને ફત્તુ મિયાં નામનું પાત્ર ઘડવાની પ્રેરણા મળી. દૂબળાપાતળા દાઢીધારી ફત્તુ મિયાં લેંઘો અને બંડીનો પોશાક પહેરતા. માથે ટોપી રાખતા. આ મિયાંના સ્વભાવની એક ખાસિયત હતી કે એ બહાદુર હોવાના બણગાં ફૂંકતા, પરંતુ અંદરખાને અત્યંત બીકણ હતા. એટલે મિયાં સાથે ફુસકી નામ જોડી દેવા વાર્તા લખી નાખી.")

Later he created the Hindu character Tabha Bhatt for the purpose of Hindu-Muslim unity. He created Tabha Bhatt based on the Brahmin priests of Kashi.

== Characters and story ==
Miya Fuski and his friend Tabha Bhatt are the central characters in the story. Miya Fuski is tall and thin while Tabha Bhatt is short and pot-bellied. Miya Fuski is a Muslim and wears lehenga, waistcoat and cap. He is bald and has a long beard with large round eyes. Tabha Bhatt is a Hindu Brahmin character who wears typical paghadi on his head, loose cloth on his shoulder and dhoti. Other recurring characters are Bibi, wife of Miya; Dala Sheth, a merchant.

The real name of Miya Fuski is Fattu Miya. He worked a guard. Once he assumed a group of donkeys as a group of thieves and boasted about himself. Later he hides and becomes Miya Fuski from Fattu Miya. Fuski literally means timid in Gujarati. He is a novice and vulnerable person. He is involved in situations where he behaves stupidly and hilariously but the result is always in his favour in the end. Tabha Bhatt accompanies him in his misadventures. Miya is timid inwardly and often boasts of his bravery but he finds his way with his wit in difficult situations.

== Reception ==
The stories were popular with children as well as admired by adults. They are still popular across Gujarat and the characters are considered as the icons of children's literature in Gujarati language. The catchphrase Ame Kon? Sipai Bachha (Gujarati: અમે કોણ ? સિપાઈ બચ્ચા, English:Who we are? Brave Children) from the stories became popular with children.

Gujarati author Chandrakant Bakshi had written, "Miya Fuski and Jivram Joshi will live on in children's literature until the ABC of Gujarati language lives on".

== Adaptations ==
The stories of Miya Fuski are adapted into plays, TV series and a film. Bhargav Joshi, son of Jivram Joshi, adapted the stories in a play, Miya Fuski Ane Tabha Bhatt. Asit Kumarr Modi produced and Sandeep Patel directed a TV series, Miya Fuski, for DD Gujarati. The characters were also adapted in a children's Gujarati film Miya Fuski 007 in 1987 starring Johny Walker and Kishor Bhatt in the lead roles. The film was directed by Manhar Raskapur and produced by Mukesh Pandya.

Industrialist Rashmin Majithia's company Zen Opus holds copyrights of Miya Fuski and other characters created by Joshi. The rights were acquired in 2020 from descendants of Joshi. Majithia has announced their adaptations in other media.

== Publication ==
The stories first appeared in Zagmag starting 1945. They were later published as book format by Sandesh Balsathi Granthmala in 1946, by Bharati Sahitya Sangh in 1951, by Zagmag Prakashan in 1953, by R. R. Sheth ni Company in 1963, and by Zen Opus in 2021.

Several stories were later republished under the title, Miya Fuski Vinodmala. Some of them are:

- Miya Fuski : Baapnu Sapnu
- Miya Fuski : Bhajiyano Bhav
- Miya Fuski : Bhootiyo Kagal
- Miya Fuski : Bhuvanu Bhoot
- Miya Fuski : Chorno Kuvo
- Miya Fuski : Dala Sheth no Kuvo
- Miya Fuski : Dala Shethni Bhavai
- Miya Fuski : Fattuni Fuski
- Miya Fuski : Jaadui Vatko
- Miya Fuski : Kano Vandaro
- Miya Fuski : Khudani Potali
- Miya Fuski : Lanka Jalawi
- Miya Fuski : Miyani Mijbani
- Miya Fuski : Thai Fajeti
- Miya Fuski : Unganashi Raja
- Miya Fuski : Vilayati Saheb
- Miya Fuski Ane Bhoot
- Miya Fuski Ane Daglo
- Miya Fuski Ane Kachabo
- Miya Fuski Ane Nandudo Chor
- Miya Fuski Ane Sadino Rang
- Miya Fuski Ane Tabha Bhatt : Dadamsha
- Miya Fuski Kotarma
- Miya Fuski Na Gha
- Miya Fuski Nu Maran
- Miya Fuski Vakil Thaya
