= Vinitha =

Indian writer

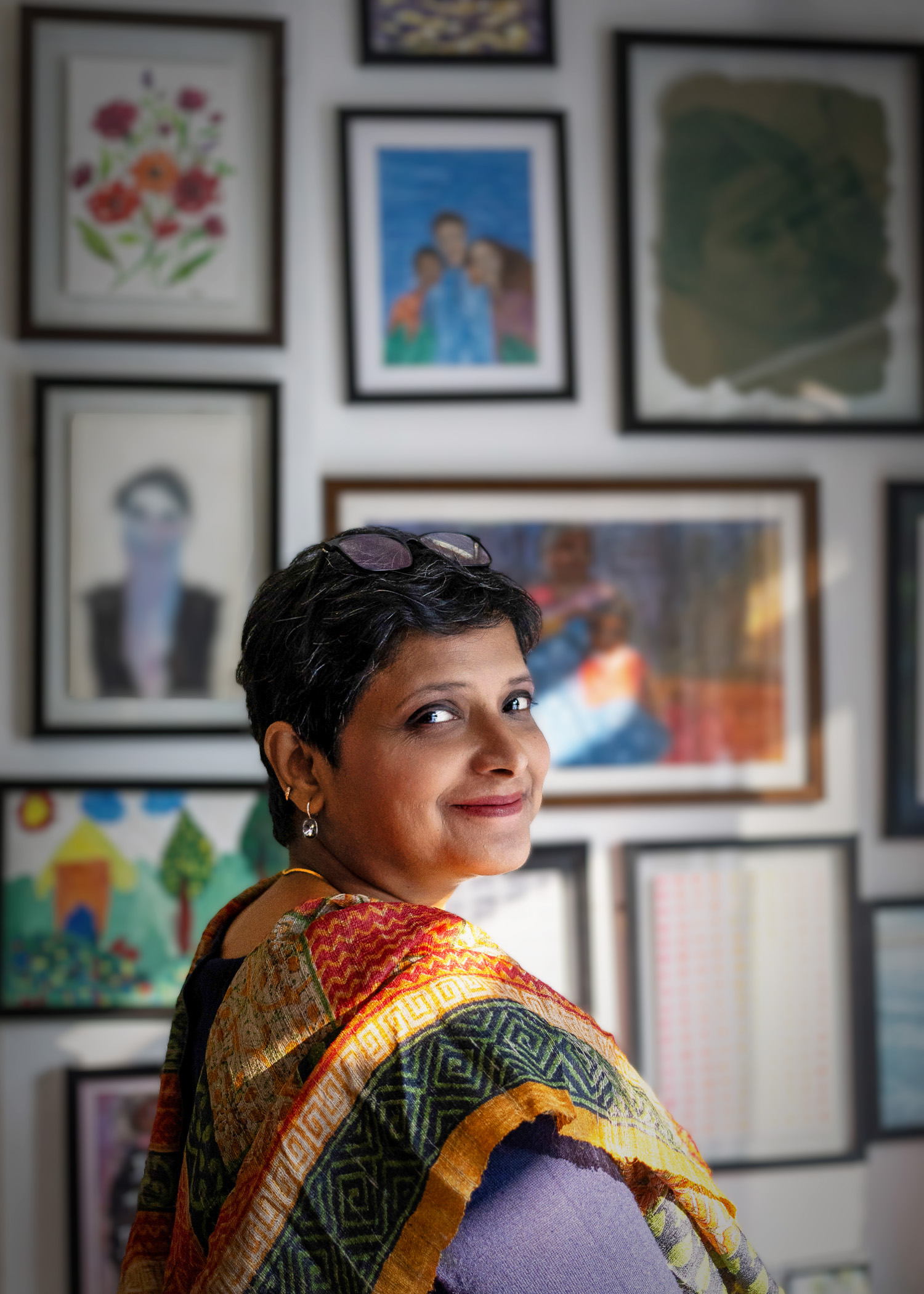
- Born: October 19, 1972 (age 53); Mumbai, India
- Occupations: Author, editor
- Children: 2
- Writing career
- Period: 2007–present
- Genres: Children's literature, fiction, non-fiction, picture books
- Notable awards: FICCI Publishing Awards, Neev Book Award
- Website: vinithastories.com

Vinitha Ramchandani is an Indian author of over 30 books tailored for children and young adults, spanning genre fiction, non-fiction, and picture books. Notably, her book Sera Learns to Fly won the Best Children's Book of the Year award at the FICCI Publishing Awards in 2019, while Lost and Found in a Mumbai Koliwada received multiple award nominations in 2020. Also her children's picture-book Ammu and the Sparrows gained recognition by being listed on the Parag Honour List and receiving the prestigious Neev Literature Award in 2021. Four of her stories have been integrated into the curricula of educational boards such as CBSE and ICSE.

== Career ==
Vinitha has worked in the fields of editing and writing for over 20 years. Her writing spans both fiction and creative non-fiction, covering topics such as the environment, body positivity, and emotional well-being for children. Notably, she has explored urban living spaces and their relevance to children through her popular column, 'Mumbai for Kids,' published in the tabloid Mid-Day, as well as 'City Mosaic Series' published in the People Places Project.

Her literary endeavors extend beyond traditional storytelling formats. She co-authored 'Once Upon a Story' with Dr. Swati Popat Vats, a book for teachers exploring the life and teaching methodology of Gijubhai Badheka. Furthermore, Vinitha's poetic work also got featured in publications such as The Alipore Post Poetry Archive.

In recognition of her dedication to empathy and education, Vinitha was honored with the Kalinga Fellowship in 2018 for her work with urban school children. Additionally, she was awarded a scholarship at Hedgebrook’s Writers in Residence Program in 2020, supporting fully-funded residencies for selected women-identified writers.

== Awards and recognitions ==
- FICCI's Special Jury Award for Best Book of the Year (Age Category Below 10), 2020 for Sera Learns to Fly
- Parag Honour List and Neev Literature Award, 2021 for Ammu and the Sparrows
- Parag Honour List 2024 for Jamini Roy's Unbroken Lines

== Works ==
- Mom's Going to Have a Baby: The Reproductive System. IETS Publication. 2007. ISBN 978-81-89636-36-4.
- The Tiger Charmer (in English and Malayalam). Mango, DC Books. 2008. ISBN 978-8126421855.
- The Birdman (in English and Malayalam). Mango, DC Books. 2008. ISBN 978-8126420803.
- When the Mountains Laughed (in English and Malayalam). Mango, DC Books. 2008. ISBN 978-8126421862.
- Turtle Tales (in English and Malayalam). Mango, DC Books. 2008. ISBN 978-8126421459. (CBSE curriculum)
- Living Dreams (in English and Malayalam). Mango, DC Books. 2008. ISBN 978-8126455904. (ICSE curriculum)
- Krishna and the Ducks (in English and Malayalam). Mango, DC Books. 2008. ISBN 978-8126420827.
- Unni's Story (in English and Malayalam). Mango, DC Books. 2008. ISBN 978-8126421442. (CBSE curriculum)
- Sethu Learns to Smile (in English and Malayalam). Mango, DC Books. 2008. ISBN 978-8126421435.
- Mallika and the Cobra (in English and Malayalam). Mango, DC Books. 2008. ISBN 978-8126420810.
- Meerabai (in English and Malayalam). Mango Classics, DC Books. 2011. ISBN 978-8126433001.
- The Tongue Cut Sparrow and Other Stories. Mango, DC Books. 2011. ISBN 978-8126430819.
- The Mirror of Matsuyama and the Stone Cutter and other Japanese Folk Tales. Mango DC Books. 2011. ISBN 978-8126430802.
- Living with Bonsai. Simon and Schuster India. 2012. ISBN 978-8184620504. (Ghost-written)
- Character-Building Tales from Aesop's. Smile Books. 2013. ISBN 9789382238614.
- Character Building Bedtime Stories. Smile Books. 2013. ISBN 978-9382238669.
- Vriksha: Original Tree Stories and Real Tree Facts. Mango, DC Books. 2013. ISBN 9788126443598.
- People Called Mumbai: Children's Version. FunOKPlease. 2015. ISBN 978-9381593264.
- Subhas Chandra Bose: What Netaji Did, What Netaji Said. Hachette India. 2015. ISBN 978-9350098301.
- Sera Learns to Fly (in English and Hindi). Katha India. 2018. ISBN 978-9388284035.
- Lost and Found in a Mumbai Koliwada. The People Place Project & Penguin Random House. 2019. ISBN 978-9387280519.
- Rain: A City Through Seasons. The People Place Project & Penguin Random House. 2019. ISBN 978-9-38728-051-9.
- Once Upon a Story: Divaswapna and the Gijubhai Method. The Write Place & Authors Upfront. 2019. ISBN 978-9-38728-031-1. Co-Written with Dr Swati Popat Vats
- Ammu and the Sparrows (in English, Marathi, Hindi, Kannada, Telugu, Nepali, and Indonesian). Partham Books. 2020. ISBN 978-93-90190-57-7.
- Be Careful Bappa. The People Place Project & Penguin Random House. 2021. ISBN 978-9-38443-994-1.
- Yaari: An Anthology on Friendship by Women and Queer Folx. Yoda Press. 2022. ISBN 978-9382579168.
- Fabulous Fables from India. Harper Collins. 2023. ISBN 978-9356990043.
- Stories from the Panchatantra. Harper Collins. 2023. ISBN 978-93-5699-458-4.
- Jamin Roy's Unbroken Lines. Art1st. 2023. ISBN 978-8194210931.
- Hug Yourself: Body Positivity and Empowerment Stories for Teenagers. Penguin Random House. 2024. ISBN 978-0143470557.
- The Girl Who Wouldn't Stay Within the Lines. Daffodil Lane Books. 2025. ISBN 978-9365375251.
- Simple Not Easy. Crosswords Bookstores Private Limited. 2026. ISBN 978-9349943506. Co-Written with Rajneesh Mahajan
- Uma Kapoor Vs The Universe. Penguin Random House. 2026. ISBN 978-0143477877.
