= Swami Anand =

Gujarati writer (1887–1976)

- Born: Himmatlal Dave; 1887; Shiyani near Wadhwan, British India
- Died: 25 January 1976 (aged 88–89); Bombay, India
- Occupations: Writer; Monk; Activist

Swami Anand (8 September 1887 – 25 January 1976) was a monk, a Gandhian activist and a Gujarati writer from India. He was the manager of Gandhi's publications such as Navajivan and Young India and inspired Gandhi to write his autobiography, The Story of My Experiments with Truth. He wrote sketches, memoir, biographies, philosophy, travelogues and translated some works.

== Biography ==
=== Early life ===
Swami Anand was born Himmatlal on 8 September 1887 at Shiyani village near Wadhwan to Ramchandra Dave (Dwivedi) and Parvati in Audichya Brahmin family. His father was a teacher. He was among seven siblings. He was brought up and educated in Bombay. At the age of ten, he left home in opposition to marriage and due to an offer by a monk to show him God. He wandered for three years with several different monks. He took a vow of renunciation while still in his teens, took on the name Swami Anand and became a monk with the Ramakrishna Mission. He also lived at the Advaita Ashram where he studied.

Anand's entry into the Indian independence movement was through his association with the revolutionaries of Bengal in 1905. Later, he worked in the Kesari, the Marathi newspaper founded by Bal Gangadhar Tilak, in 1907. He was also involved in independence activities in rural regions. He also edited the Gujarati edition of Marathi daily Rashtramat during the same period. When it was closed down, he travelled the Himalayas in 1909. In 1912, he taught at the Hill Boys School in Almoda which was founded by Annie Besant.

=== Gandhi's associate ===
Mahatma Gandhi first met Anand in Bombay on 10 January 1915, the day after he had returned from South Africa. Gandhi launched his weekly, the Navjeevan from Ahmedabad four years later. Its inaugural issue came out in September 1919 and soon the workload increased. It was at this juncture that Gandhi sent for Anand to become the manager of the publication. Swami Anand took over its management in late 1919. He proved to be a good editor and manager and when the Young India was launched, he moved the publication to larger premises and with printing equipment donated by Mohammed Ali Jouhar, its publication began. On 18 March 1922, he was jailed for one and a half years as a publisher for an article published in Young India.

Gandhi's autobiography was serialised in the Navjeevan from 1925 to 1928. It was written by Gandhi at Swami Anand's insistence and an English translation of these chapters appeared in installments in the Young India as well. Later, The Bhagavad Gita According to Gandhi was published based on the talks Gandhi gave at the Satyagraha Ashram in Ahmedabad in 1926. Swami Anand played a role in inspiring Gandhi to write this work as well.

He was Vallabhai Patel's secretary during the Bardoli Satyagraha of 1928. In 1930, he was again jailed for three years for participating in Salt Satyagraha at Vile Parle in Bombay. When he was released in 1933, he focused on the upliftment of the tribals and the underprivileged. He also founded the Ashrams in Bordi in Gujarat in 1931 followed by in Thane, Kausani and Kosbad. He had also participated in relief work of the 1934 earthquake in north India and in the 1942 Quit India movement. Following Partition in 1947, he worked amongst the refugees from Sialkot and Hardwar.

=== Later life ===
After Independence, Swami Anand took an interest in agriculture and agrarian issues. He was concerned about agricultural productivity and livelihoods, but had deep respect for the practical wisdom of small farmers. He was inspired by George Washington Carver and Robert Oppenheimer, whose biography he wrote. From 1957 to 1976, he made the Kosbad Agricultural Institute at Dahanu, near Bombay, his home. He died on 25 January 1976 at 2:15 am in Bombay following heart attack.

== Literary career ==
Swami Anand was a polyglot, proficient in Gujarati, Marathi, Sanskrit, Hindi, Urdu and English. He was acquainted with the classical and folk traditions of the Gujarati, Marathi and Sanskrit languages and was influenced by the works of Ralph Waldo Emerson, Max Muller, Walt Whitman, Sri Aurobindo and Swami Vivekananda. Besides fiction, Swami Anand also wrote on issues of science, religion and society. He had written memoirs, biographies, philosophies, travelogues and translations. Many of his works were published posthumously.

He has written several character sketches, biographical reflections and biographies of his friends and associates including Gandhijina Sansmarano (1963), Bhagwan Buddha (1964, co-written), Kulkathao (1966), Dharatinu Lun (1969), Motne Hamfavnara (1969), Santona Anuj (1971), Naghrol (1975), Santono Falo (1978). Kulkathao, a series of pen portraits of people from the Bhatia caste, won him the Sahitya Akademi Award in 1969, but, he refused to accept the award due to his vow not to accept any monetary benefits for his writings. Gujarati writer and translator Mulshankar Bhatt has collected his best of the character sketches and published as Dharati Ni Arati (1977). In it, he has sketched the character of those people who had created a deep impression in his life. Some of the popular characters from it are Dhanima, Mahadev Desai, Vamandada and Dr. Mayadas.

His philosophical essay collections include Isunu Balidan (1922), Ishopnishad, Ishubhagwat (1977), Lokgeeta, Navla Darshan Ane Bija Lekho (1968), Manavtana Veri (1966), Anant Kala (1967), Atamna Mool (1967), Sarvoday Vicharana (co-written). His Anant Kala is a meditation on nature and spirituality, while his writing also covers the Upanishads and the Sarvodaya Movement extensively. These essays share views on religion and society based on the concept of Sarva Dharma Sama Bhava which he had embraced.

He also produced travelogues based on his travels in the Himalayas which were published in Prasthan magazine between 1954 and 1960 and posthumously published in Uttarapathni Yatra and Baraf Raste Badrinath (1980). His translation of Sven Hedin's travel writing as Asiana Bhraman Ane Sanshodhan in Gujarati, was also published posthumously in 1979.

Bachpanna Bar Varsh (1982) is his incomplete autobiographical work. Juni Moodi (1980) is a collection of proverbs and idioms.

Some of his other works include Ambavadiyun and Amaratvel and a compilation of correspondence between him and Gandhi's colleagues are contained in the Ugamani Dishano Ujas and Dhodhamar, all edited by Dinkar Joshi.

A biography of Swami Anand was written by Chandrakant Sheth and he is the central character in Sujata Bhatt's poem, "Point No Point".

== See also ==
- List of Gujarati-language writers
