= Vijaygupta Maurya =

Indian science writer (1909-1992)

- Born: Vijayshankar Morarji Vasu; 26 March 1909; Porbandar, Gujarat
- Died: 10 July 1992
- Other names: Himachal, Soham, Chanakya, Muktanand VishwaYatri, Pandit Kaushik Sharma, V. M. Vasu, Goswami Shree Vijayraiji, Vijaytung, Vachaspati, Indradhanu, VasantVijay
- Education: Bhavsingh High School, Porbandar; Mumbai University
- Occupations: Journalist and author
- Years active: 1945–1991
- Employer(s): Janmabhumi, Parkruti Magazine
- Known for: Pioneering science journalism in Gujarati
- Children: Nagendra Vijay, Bhardvaj Vijay
- Parents: Murarji (father); Motibai (mother)

Vijaygupta Maurya (March 26, 1903 – July 10, 1992) was a pioneer science writer in Gujarati. He wrote thousands of articles popularising science as well as several books.

== Life ==
=== Early life ===
Vijaygupta Maurya was born Vijayshankar Murarji Vasu in Porbandar (now in Gujarat, India) in 1909. He completed his high school education at Bhavsingh High School in Porbandar. He studied law in Bombay (now Mumbai) and returned to Porbandar in 1933 to start his legal practice. Four years later, he was elevated to the position of a judge. Due to his passion for bird watching, he wrote articles on birds for Prakriti magazine.

In 1944, Indian independence activist Vasant Avsare came to Porbandar and asked Vijaygupta Maurya to fight his case. However, as Vijaygupta Maurya was already at the position of judge, he could not do so. This prompted Vijaygupta Maurya to resign from his position and took Avsare's case as a lawyer. This ended Vijaygupta Maurya's career as judge and he decided to stay in Mumbai. He found a job as a typist for the salary of Rs. 0.75 per month at Gordhandas ni Pedhi.

=== Career as Journalist and Writer ===
Between financial struggles, he wrote for Prakriti magazine. Few years later, he was invited to write for a Gujarati newspaper Janmabhumi. He wrote articles on birds and animals printed on the last page of Janambhumi Pravasi with limited space and eventually became an editor and writer of the whole page. He wrote on varied subjects including science, astronomy and biology.

In 1973, he left Janmabhumi Pravasi and became a freelancer writing for various magazines. He wrote several books during that time that included the theme of serving interesting information rolled up in stories as well as books based on true events. His career as a writer spanned over 46 years but he continued to struggle financially. During last years, he had several ailments including poor vision, back pain and the Parkinson's disease. After a long illness, he died on 10 July 1992.

== Personal life ==
His sons, Nagendra Vijay and Bhardvaj Vijay, were also popular science writers. Nagendra Vijay started writing at the age of 14 and pioneered the first Gujarati science magazine Scope and later Safari. His grandson, Harshal Pushkarna, is also popular science writer and currently heads Safari.

== Selected books ==
Some of the Gujarati books authored by Vijaygupta Maurya

- Sherkhan (શેરખાન)
- Kapina Parakramo (કપિનાં પરાક્રમો)
- Sinh Vaghni Sobatma (સિંહ વાઘની સોબતમાં)
- Shikarini Tarap (શિકારીની તરાપ)
- Kimiyagar Kabir (કીમિયાગર કબીર)
- Hathina Tolama (હાથીના ટોળામાં)
- Kutch thi Kashmir Sudhi Ladi Janyu Jawanoe (કચ્છથી કાશ્મીર સુધી લડી જાણ્યું જવાનોએ)
- Kashmirnu Agnisnan (કાશ્મીરનું અગ્નિસ્નાન)
- Zagmagtu Zaverat (ઝગમગતું ઝવેરાત)
- Samudrani Ajayab Jeevshrishti (સમુદ્રની અજાયબ જીવસૃષ્ટિ)
- Prakrutina Ladakvya Pankhio (પ્રકૃતિનાં લાડકવાયાં પંખીઓ)
- Jindagi Jindagi (જિંદગી જિંદગી)
- Manas Jem Boline Superstar Baneli Ek Hati Mena (માણસ જેમ બોલીને સુપરસ્ટાર બનેલી એક હતી મેના)
- Circus Jeevanna Jivsatosatna Sahaso (સરકસ જીવનના જીવ સટોસટનાં સાહસો)
- Samudrani Sahaskatha (સમુદ્રની સાહસકથા)
- Prithvidarshan (પૃથ્વીદર્શન)
- Hawamannu Gyan Sha Mate? (હવામાનનું જ્ઞાન શા માટે?)
- Galápagos (ગાલાપાગોસ)
- Aa Chhe Russia (આ છે રશિયા)
