= Swati Popat Vats =

Indian educationist, entrepreneur, and author

- Born: Mumbai, India
- Occupations: Educationist; author
- Years active: 1986–present
- Title: President of Early Childhood Association (ECA); President of Podar Education Network
- Awards: NZTC Fellowship of Honour, IDA Education Awards 2023 for Exemplary Leadership in Early Learning

Swati Popat (née Vats) is an Indian educationist, parenting mentor, entrepreneur, and author in the field of early childhood education. Her areas of expertise are child psychology, pedagogy, and curriculum development. She is the president at the Early Childhood Association (ECA) India and the Association for Primary Education and Research (APER) India. She also serves as the president of the Podar Education Network and is the founder and director of Podar Jumbo Kids and Podar Prep.

Vats has received recognition for her contributions to education, both domestically and internationally.

== Career ==
=== Educationist ===
Vats has been in the field of education for 38 years. She holds several positions in the education sector globally. These include the President of Podar Education Network, Early Years Consultant, Series Editor for the Cambridge International Early Years Program in India, and serving on the advisory board of Cambridge University Press and Assessment South Asia.

She is also a global member of the Think Tank of Kidzania. She is the founder expert on the world's first video-based parenting website Born Smart which helps parents understand and nurture brain development in the first 1000 days.

She has also designed ECE curriculum for multiple global preps.

=== Author ===
Vats authored over 30 books for children, parents and educators covering topics such as early childhood development and effective parenting strategies. Notable among her works is 'Once Upon a Story,' co-authored with Vinitha, which offers insights into the life and teaching methodology of Gijubhai Badheka, targeting educators. Additionally, Vats co-authored 'Once Upon a Child' with Swaroop Sampat, which is about the life and times of Lev Vygotsky and how his work has found an important place in the Reggio Emilia approach.

== Contribution to early childhood education ==
Vats has studied the early childhood policy and curriculum of more than 52 countries and is instrumental in adapting the Te Whariki curriculum of the government of New Zealand and some other countries' curriculums. As an advocate for children's rights, Vats has worked incessantly to promote developmentally-appropriate curriculums and ban school interviews of children. As President of Early Childhood Association, she is involved with many state governments in developing the policy for ECE and CBSE board's optional subject of ECE for standard XI and XII.

Vats has also introduced Kiducation philosophy which is about education from the point of view of the child's overall development. Its goal is to make changes in the education system, by obliterating stress by gifting children stress-free learning.

Her most recent agenda is the pursuit of bringing awareness about child safety be it road safety or the safety of children and adolescents from sexual abuse and for this, she has organized workshops and written two books 'When Touch Becomes Trouble' and 'The Secret Touch', and a handbook 'A New Normal – Understand.Prevent.Heal: Winning the war against child sexual abuse', that can help kids, teachers, and parents. She has used stories to train children on Good Touch Bad Touch and teachers on POCSO awareness.

She has delivered two TED talks, titled Innocence and A Full Brain Work-Out.

== Bibliography ==
- Jumbo Ideas for Happy Roads. Podar publishing. 2010. ISBN 978-8190795364.
- Who Likes Mud?. eca-india.org. 2011. ISBN 978-9380711102.
- Choosing the right education for your child. eca-india.org. 2011. ISBN 978-9380711027.
- When Touch Becomes Trouble. 2012. ISBN 978-9380711140.
- How to teach so kids can learn. Podar publishing. 2013. ISBN 978-8190795333.
- Are you unknowingly harming your child. Podar publishing. 2013. ISBN 978-8190795302.
- Red Riding hood and the wolf. Podar publishing. 2013. ISBN 978-9380711133.
- Why does Zelda need stripes. Podar publishing. 2013. ISBN 978-8190795319.
- Goldilocks and the three magic words. 2013. ISBN 978-9380711126.
- How to be a Super Mom. Podar publishing. 2013. ISBN 978-8190795388.
- Parikrama. eca-india.org. 2014. ISBN 978-8192786827.
- BORN SMART. Podar publishing. 2015. ISBN 978-9380711249.
- Safety Manual for Kindergartens & Early Childhood Centres. eca-india.org. 2015. ISBN 978-8192786834.
- The secret touch. Podar publishing. 2015. ISBN 978-9380711324.
- My Diwali Story. Podar Publishing. 2015. ISBN 978-9380711201.
- Growing Up With Mahatma Gandhi. Podar Publishing. 2015. ISBN 978-9380711348.
- The Tiger The Bee The Sparrow. Early Childhood Association. 2016. ISBN 978-8192786889.
- Quality in Early Childhood Education. eca-india.org. 2016. ISBN 978-8192786865.
- Look Who's Talking. Podar Publishing. 2016. ASIN B01BDRP7UG. (co-authored with Shiven Jain)
- Effective Practices for Addressing Challenging Behaviours. eca-india.org. 2016. ISBN 978-8192786858.
- A-Z OF PARENTING. EARLY CHILDHOOD ASSOCIATION. 2017. ISBN 978-8192786803.
- Once Upon A Gift. Crossword and WritePlace. 2017. ISBN 978-9392091001. (co-authored)
- Super Dads are Born Smart. Podar publishing. 2017. ISBN 978-9380711041.
- EARLY CHILDHOOD EDUCATION: POLICY INTO PRACTICE. EARLY CHILDHOOD ASSOCIATION. 2017. ISBN 978-8192786896.
- Once Upon a Story: Divaswapna and the Gijubhai Method. The Write Place & Authors Upfront. 2019. ISBN 978-9-38728-031-1. (co-authored with Vinitha)
- Ms. Pencil and Her Team. Kakani Edu Media Pvt Ltd. 2020. ASIN B08JD1V3QS.
- Foundational Numeracy. Scholastic India. 2020. ISBN 978-9354719646. (co-authored with Fatema Agarkar)
- Yash and Yashika Learn about Coding. Scholastic India. 2020. ISBN 978-9390066780.
- My Feelings. Early Childhood Association. 2020. ISBN 978-8193599853.
- NEP - National Education Policy - From policy to practice. Edu-Tech Publishing. 2021. ASIN B08WK8DQ6B. (co-authored)
- Cod and Codie Love to Code. Scholastic India. 2021. ISBN 978-9390189755.
- Gosh! Why does Gina need spots?. Early Childhood Association. 2021. ISBN 978-8195351138.
- No! I am not a takin. 2021. ISBN 978-9389058529.
- No! I am not a Kangaroo. 2021. ISBN 978-9389058512.
- No! I am not an Elephant. 2021. ISBN 978-9389058505.
- Understanding Metacognition in the foundational years. Edu-Tech Publishing. 2021. ASIN B08WK71218. (co-authored)
- Why do words and numbers confuse Jai and Sashi. Scholastic India. 2021. ISBN 9789351035336.
- Once Upon a Child. Scholastic India. 2024. ISBN 978-9354718618. (co-authored with Swaroop Sampat)

== Awards and recognitions ==
- NZTC Fellowship of Honour 2012 by New Zealand Tertiary College.
- IDA Education Awards 2023 for Exemplary Leadership in Early Learning by India Didactics Association
