= Sheth Chimanlal Nagindas Vidyalaya =

High School in Ahmedabad, India

Sheth Chimanlal Nagindas Vidyavihar

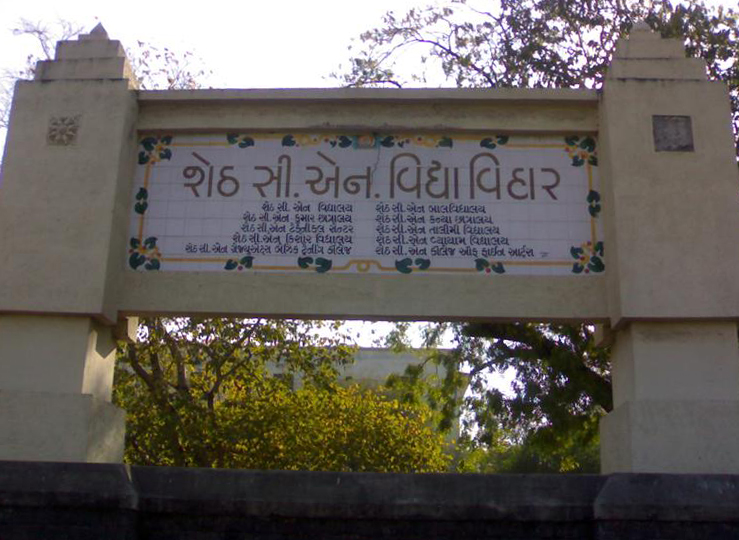
- Sheth C. N. Vidyalaya

Location
- Ambavadi; Ahmedabad, India, Gujarat
- Coordinates: 23°1′14″N 72°33′6″E

Information
- School type: Granted/Non-granted, co-education
- Motto: Sanskrit: तस्य भासा विभाति (The light radiates from Him.)
- Established: 26 April 1912; 113 years ago
- Founder: Manekba Chimanlal Sheth, Ambalal Sarabhai, Chinabhai Madhavlal Shah, Mansukhbhai Bhagabhai, Bechardas Harsukhbhai
- School board: Gujarat Secondary and Higher Secondary Education Board, Gandhinagar
- Area trustee: Kartikeya Sarabhai, Saubhagyachand K.Shah, Bhalchandra R. Shah, Mirai Chatterjee
- Chairman: Suhrid Sarabhai
- Director: Kirit Joshi
- Campus size: 72 acre
- Song: Ame Namie Tane Cheersathi, Sathi Vidyavihar by Snehrashmi
- Publication: Sannidhi
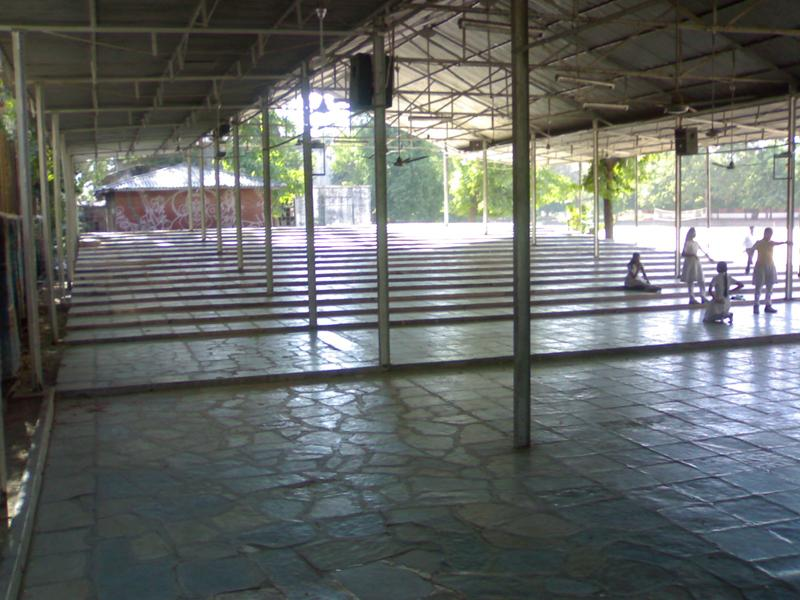
- Snehrashmi Prathna Mandir

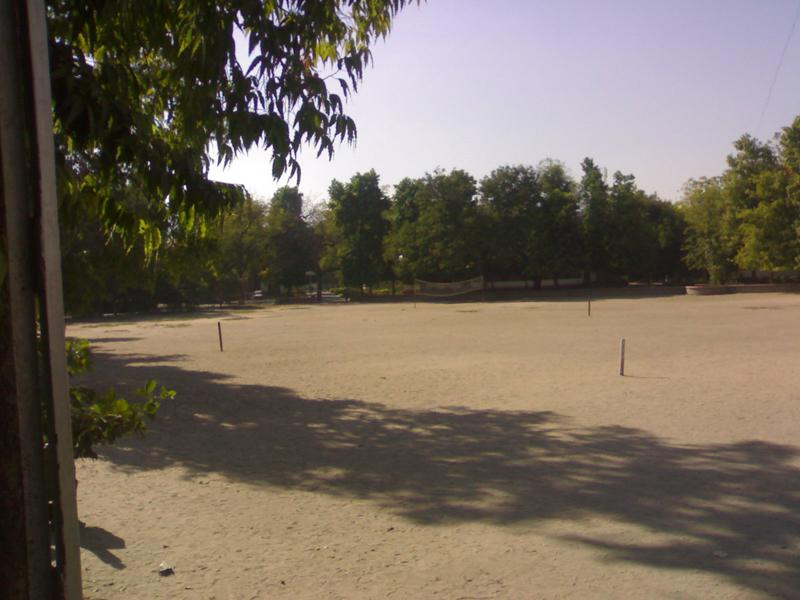
- Playground

Sheth Chimanlal Nagindas Vidyalaya is a school and the Sheth Chimanlal Nagindas Vidyavihar (abbreviated Sheth C. N. Vidyavihar) is a group of educational institutes located within a campus in the Ambawadi area of Ahmedabad, Gujarat, India. It is one of the oldest educational institutions in Gujarat established in 1912.

== History ==
In 1908, Sheth Chimanlal Nagindas prepared his will establishing a trust in the name of his late brother – Sheth Sarabhai Maganbhai and started a boarding school for children from the interest of the fund. He died within four months of preparing his will at the age of forty. His wife Manekba Chimanlal established Kumar Chhatralaya (Boys Hostel) on 26 April 1912 in memory of his husband.

This first institution was established at Maganbhai ni Wadi in Gheekanta. in 1921, the hostel was shifted to Sheth Ambalal Sarabhai’s bungalow, "Shantisadan" in Mirzapur. The trust established his own middle and high schools in 1926 for the hostel boys. The boys hostel again shifted from "Shantisadan" to Military bungalow in Khanpur in 1928. Chiman Chhatra Sangh, an association of hostel students, was also established in 1928. With growing needs, the Trust acquired land in Ambawadi to establish campus in 1929. The high school building was constructed and opened on 26 February 1933 and khadi was introduced as the uniform for students and staff.

In 1937, the school started admitting students other than hostel boys and Sheth C.N. Technical Centre was established to provide vocational training courses. Indumati, a daughter of Chimanlal, was elected as a member of Ahmedabad Municipal School Board in 1937. Jhinabhai Desai aka Snehrashmi joined the institute and coined the word, "Vidyavihar" for the entire campus comprising boys hostel, schools, technical institute. In 1941, the primary school was established. Shishuvihar (pre-primary school) was established in 1945 along with Kanya Chhatralaya (Girls Hostel).

In 1947, a Primary Teachers Training College was established. An art teachers’ diploma was started in 1952 which later became Fine Arts College. In 1953, Manekba and the trustee Nirmalaben died. In 1959, Derasar was constructed. Manekba Vinayvihar was established at Adalaj in 1959. In 1961, Indumati established Vyayam Vidyabhavan for training physical instructors and the first fine arts college of newly founded Gujarat state. In 1964, the high school was given special recognition of a multipurpose school and the Government of India recognized it as the special science school. As part of this recognition, technical education classes were introduced in the school in 1965. The same year Vidyaviahr Geetmala written and compiled by Bhailalbhai Shah was published.

The health centre was established in 1973 and the science and commerce higher education was started in 1976. Kalaniketan, an institute to promote Indian classical music, dance and other cultural activities in 1981. In 1985, the Chairman and Managing Trustee Indumati died and passed her home, Chandan Bungalow to the Sheth Sarabhai Maganbhai Trust Fund. C. N. Computer Centre was established at a cost of Rs. 35 lakh with all advanced facilities in 1996. The regional office of the State Bank of India is started on the campus in 1997.

Angreji Kendra, a language centre for English was established in 1999 while a new building for preprimary school was opened in 2000. C. N. Computer Centre awarded with the "3rd Computer Literacy Excellence Awards for School – 2004" by Abdul Kalam, the then President of India. A separate building is constructed for the Angreji Kendra. The building was inaugurated by Professor Yashpal; an eminent educationist and Member of Rajya Sabha. In 2010, English Medium school was established which was moved to new campus two years later. Sheth C. N. Sports Academy was opened in 2011. It has two basketball courts, five cricket practice pitches and a ground, volleyball court, three table tennis tables, handball and hockey grounds.

== Campus ==
The campus is spread over 72 acres. It contains kindergarten to 12th grade schools, a Fine Arts College, a teachers training college, a Jain temple as well as farms and hostels.

== About the school ==
Two sculptures of the goddess Saraswati and Pragna Paramita stand at the entrance of the High School's two-storey building.

The school is a co-educational K through 12 institution. The campus has separate buildings for kindergarten, junior high, and high school.

The school was selected as a multipurpose school for fine arts under the Government of India scheme.

The school is based on Gandhian values and require students to wear Khadi (hand-spun cotton) clothes as their uniform. Children in all classes are encouraged to sweep and clean their own classrooms and mingle with fellow-students from diverse socio-economic backgrounds.

Apart from academics, the school encourages student development through cultural and sports activities. The school is known for its activities in the Prayer Hall, named after the Gujarati poet Jhinabhai Desai, alias Snehrashmi.

== Notable alumni ==
- Gautam Adani, industrialist, chairman of the Adani Group
- Jhinabhai Desai, poet
- Yoseph Macwan, poet and critic
- Ramesh Sumant Mehta, environmental and sanitary engineer, former chairman of the trust
- Pankaj Patel, industrialist, Zydus Cadila
- Ramchandra Patel, poet and novelist
- Indumati Chimanlal Sheth, daughter of founder and trustee, politician and social worker
- Malhar Thakar, actor
- Dhvanit Thaker, radio host
- Kartikeya Sarabhai, environment educationist
- Vikram Sarabhai, Indian physicist
- Priti Sengupta, poet and writer
- Rajesh Vyas, poet
