= Snehrashmi =

Gujarati language author from India (1903–1991)

- Born: Jhinabhai Ratanji Desai; 16 April 1903; Chikhli, Bombay Presidency
- Died: 6 January 1991 (aged 87); Ahmedabad, Gujarat, India
- Writing career
- Pen name: Snehrashmi
- Language: Gujarati

Jhinabhai Ratanji Desai (16 April 1903 – 6 January 1991), popularly known by his pen name Snehrashmi, was a Gujarati language author and Indian independence activist.

== Biography ==
Desai was born on 16 April 1903 at Chikhli, Bombay Presidency. He left studies of matriculation and joined non-cooperation movement in 1920. He joined Gujarat Vidyapith in Ahmedabad in 1921 and graduated with a political science degree in 1926. He taught history and political science at Gujarat Vidyapith from 1926 to 1928. He was jailed from 1932 to 1933 for his involvement in Indian independence activities. He joined Rashtriya Shala in 1934 as the principal. He joined Sheth Chimanlal Nagindas Vidyalaya in Ahmedabad as principal in 1938 and later served as its director. He served as the acting Vice Chancellor of Gujarat University thrice. He presided over Gujarati Sahitya Parishad at Madras in 1972. He also served as a senate and syndicate member in different universities of Gujarat. He also served as a member of the Sahitya Akademi and Historical Records Commission.

He also served as president of Surat City Congress. Many Congress leaders in the 1920s aligned themselves with Hindu Mahasabha in Shuddhi campaign. However, Snehrashmi was one of few who was against divisive politics. Hindu-Muslim relations later reached a low point in Surat and resulted in an economic boycott of the minority community. Snehrashmi, to lessen the impact of the boycott, convinced Sardar Patel and organised a khadi exhibition. Patel himself attended the exhibition and locally famous Razaak band played at the venue which helped achieve the objective of breaking the boycott of Muslims.

He died on 6 January 1991.

== Works ==
Desai's initial works were influenced by nationalist sentiments and Gandhian ideals as he participated in the Indian independence movement. His later works were more focused on beauty and emotions. He chiefly wrote poetry and short stories but also ventured into the other forms of literature.

=== Poetry ===
His poetry collections Ardhya (1935) and Panghat (1948) including Bar Majoor nu Geet (The Song of Twelve Peasants) are the examples of Gandhian influence. His other poetry collections are Atitni Pankhmathi (1974), Kshitije Tya Lambavyo Hath (1984), and Nijleela (1984).

He introduced haiku, Japanese short form of poetry, in Gujarati literature and popularized it. Soneri Chand Rooperi Suraj (1967) is a collection of 359 haiku and six tanka poems. Kevalveej (1984) and Sunrise on the Snowpeaks are his other haiku collections.

Tarapo (1980) and Ujani are collections of children's poetry. Sakal Kavita is a collection of all his poems published between 1921 and 1984.

=== Short story ===
Gata Aasopalav (1934) was his first short story collection. Tutela Taar (1934), Swarg ane Prithvi (1935), Moti Bahen (1955), Heera na Latkaniya (1962), Shrifal (1969), Kala Topi (1962) and Snehrashmi ni Shreshth Vartao (1983) are his other short story collections.

=== Autobiography ===
His autobiography starts from 1920. His childhood till schooling is described in Mari Duniya (1970). It is followed by Safalyatanu (1983) which has detailed account of the non-cooperation movement and its leaders. It ends in 1933. It is followed by two more volumes, Ughade Navi Kshitijo (1987) and Vali Nava Aa Shrung.

=== Other works ===
Antarpat (1961) is a novel about social and cultural dimensions. Matodu ne Tulsi (1983) is a collection of plays. Bharat na Ghadvaiya (1957) is a biographocal collection. Pratisad (1984) is his book on criticism. Kavya Sangraha with Umashankar Joshi (1937), Sahitya Pallav (1941) and Sahitya Pathavali (1966) are his other compilations.

== Recognition ==
Desai was awarded the President's Award as the best teacher in 1961. He received the Ranjitram Suvarna Chandrak in 1967 and the Narmad Suvarna Chandrak in 1979. In 1987, he received the Sahitya Gaurav Puraskar.

Gujarat Chief Minister Narendra Modi dedicated Snehrashmi Botanical Garden in Surat in his memory in 2011. Uma-Snehrashmi Paritoshik, instituted first by Desai in his deceased daughter's memory, is conferred by Gujarati Sahitya Parishad.

== See also ==
- List of Gujarati-language writers
