= Gijubhai Badheka =

Indian educator (1885–1939)

Girijashankar Bhagvanji Badheka
- Born: 15 November 1885; Vallabhipur, British India
- Died: 23 June 1939 (aged 53); Bhavnagar, Gujarat, India
- Other name: Moochhali Maa
- Known for: Education, Reforms, Children's Education, Dakshinamurti
- Website: Official website

Gijubhai Badheka (15 November 1885 – 23 June 1939) was an educator who helped to introduce Montessori education methods to India. He is referred to as "Moochhali Maa" ("mother with whiskers"). Badheka was a high court lawyer; however, following the birth of his son in 1923, he developed an interest in childhood development and education. In 1920, Badheka founded the "Bal Mandir" pre-primary school. Badheka published a number of works in the field of education including Divaswapna ("Daydreams").

== Life ==
Gijubhai was born as Girjashankar Bhagwanjibhai Badheka on 15 November 1885 in Vallabhipur (Vallabhi) or Vala ( In the Saurashtra region of western India) — once an important port and town of Gujarat, established by the king Siddharaj. Badheka grew up in Bhavnagar, a city in the western Indian state of Gujarat. In 1907, he moved to East Africa and later to Bombay for work. Badheka died on 23 June 1939 in Bhavnagar, India.

== Timeline ==
- 1885 Birth 15 November, Birth Place: Chittal Saurashtra
- 1897 First Marriage with Late Hariben
- 1906 Second Marriage with Late Jariben
- 1907 Left for East Africa
- 1909 Return to India
- 1910 Law Education in Bombay (Mumbai)
- 1913 High Court Pleader, Vadhwan Camp
- 1913 Birth of Shri Narendra Bhai (Son)
- 1915 Legal Advisor of Shri Dakshinamurti Bhavan
- 1916 Associated with Dakshinamurti Vidyarthi Bhavan
- 1920 Establishment of Bal Mandir
- 1922 Inauguration of Bal Mandir Bhavan Near Takhteswar Bhavmandir in Bhavnagar by Kasturba Gandhi
- 1925 First Montessori Conference, Bhavnagar
- 1925 Establishment of Adhyapan Mandir
- 1928 Second Montessori Conference, Ahmedabad (Chaired)
- 1930 Living in Refugee Camps in Satyagraha Movement, Banar Parishad, Surat, Beginning of Akshargyan Yojna
- 1936 Discontinued Association with Shri Dakshinamurti Vidyarthi Bhavan
- 1937 - Respectfully awarded prize (Term translated from Gujrati: Samman Thailly Bheint)
- 1938 Work in Gujarat; established the last Adhyapan Mandir (Primary Teacher's College) in Rajkot
- 1939 Died on 23 June, Bhavnagar

== Contribution to education ==
In 1920, Badheka founded the Bal Mandir kindergarten. Later, Nanabhai Bhatt, Harbhai Trivedi and Badheka built the "Shree Dakshinamurti Gijubhai Vinay Mandir" school in Bhavnagar.

After completing his schooling, Gijubhai was admitted to Shamlal’s College, but for reasons unknown, he could not complete his studies. In 1907, his family sent him to East Africa to earn a living. There, he met S.P. Stevens, a solicitor who impressed upon Gijubhai the need for self-reliance—the utter refusal to depend on anybody but yourself—and put it into practice daily. It was a wonder to Gijubhai to see how Stevens made his life without banking on anyone for anything and that it was possible, in fact exhilarating, to figure things out and work single-handedly.

On his return to India in 1910, Gijubhai studied law in Mumbai. He started his legal practice in 1911 as a district pleader and, the following year, enrolled as a High Court pleader. On the personal front, his mother’s brother, Hargovind Pandya, is believed to have inspired him. Gijubhai married twice. He married his first wife, Hiraben, in 1902, when he was just seventeen. But Hiraben passed away young, and then he married Jariben in 1906. Gijubhai became a father in 1913 when a son was born to him. Soon after his birth, when the young father picked up his little boy, for a few minutes he was sad and anxious. His own childhood flashed before his eyes. After all, like every child from a respectable family, his son too would have to go to school. And school for Gijubhai meant being caned daily for the slightest misdemeanour. As he held his newborn, Gijubhai knew this little fellow would have to go to school too—a land of small terrors. "Wasn’t there a way out? Couldn’t there be a better way to teach and learn?" Gijubhai started asking questions. Gijubhai felt the real purpose of education was to have a teacher who understood the children he/she was educating. If the child spent five or more hours with one person, five days a week, shouldn’t the child also get to love and genuinely respect the teacher?

Gijubhai, like all parents, wanted his son to be happy, safe, and comfortable throughout his life. He also realised that many parents forced their kids to school, and the best schools of the time had teachers who knew only how to teach through fear. Gijubhai felt that if children were treated with respect and had enough meaningful learning opportunities, no child would abhor coming to school. In fact, they would look forward to being in a place with so many children and an adult who helped them explore the world around them. Could that be possible? Gijubhai worried about it. He turned to reading and researching. This is how he stumbled upon Maria Montessori and all that she had been working on.

These readings taught Gijubhai about Montessori education, where the adult or teacher helps unfold the child's hidden, inborn developmental powers. The child already possesses everything. The adult is the facilitator. Maria Montessori believed the child must be guided on the path to adulthood because, from the earliest moments of life, children possess great constructive energies that guide the formation of their mind and the coordination of their bodies.

Gijubhai devoured the book on the Montessori Method. It was an introduction to another microcosm, where teaching was done through the ‘play-way’ method. Enthusiastic about what he was learning, Gijubhai began spending more time with teachers and in schools. Convinced he had to be the change, he helped establish Dakshinamurti (Bala Bhavan) in 1915 and later started a hostel in Bhavnagar. In 1916, he gave up his legal practice and joined Dakshinamurti as assistant superintendent.

Gijubhai’s contribution was the development of a system of child education suited to the Indian environment, teacher training, and the creation of a body of literature for children. While liberally borrowing from the educational philosophies of Montessori, Fröbel, Dalton, and others, he combined music, dance, travel, storytelling, and outdoor play to fit Indian requirements. Freedom and love were the twin principles around which the system revolved. The school was an instant hit. Mahatma Gandhi, who had clear views on learning, was very fond of Gijubhai Badheka. He called Gijubhai ‘Moochali Ma’, or mother with whiskers, and the name stuck.

== Published works ==
Badheka published close to 200 works, including storybooks. His topics include children, education, travel and humour. However, his focus was books for children, parents and educators.

Title	Year	Publisher	Notes
Rakhdu Todi	1929		Gujarati Translation of Free School OR A Dominie's Five by Alexander Sutherland Neill
Bhaibandh			Gujarati Translation of Schoolboys by Nikolai Nosov
Mahatmao Na Chitro	1923		
Kishor Kathao Part 1 - 2	1929		
Eosap Na Patro: Gadheda	1934		
Eosap Katha	1935		
Africa Ni Safar	1944		
Dadaji Ni Talwar			
Lal Ane Hira			
Chatur Karodio			
Montessori Padhati	1927		
Aa Te Si Mathafod ?	1934		
Sikshak Ho To	1935		
Bad Jivan Ma Dokiu	1926		
Sikshan Na Vehmo	1926		
Tofani Badak	1929		
Davakhani Jay, Chadiyo	1929		
Aagad Vancho Chopdi Part 1,2,3			
Kem Sikhavvu	1935		
Chalo Vachiye	1935		
Patelad Ni Virangnao	1931		
Sanj Ni Mojo			
Prasangik Manan	1932		
Sant Padoma	1934		
Divaswapna - An Educator’s Reverie	1939	National Book Trust	
Harishchandra			Originally in Gujarati then translated in many languages
Bal Darshan			
Mari Gayn			In Gujarati meaning My Cow
Varta	1929		Periodical published in over 5 volumes containing more than 100 stories
Vaarta nu Shastra	1925		

== In popular culture ==
Gijubhai Badheka's innovative teaching methods have inspired various educational works and initiatives. Notably, Children's book author Vinitha and Dr Swati Popat Vats co-wrote a book titled Once Upon a Story: Divaswapna and the Gijubhai Method. ISBN 978-9-38728-031-1. which explores Gijubhai Badheka's life and teaching methodology.

== See also ==
- List of Gujarati-language writers
