= Nagendra Vijay =

Indian science writer

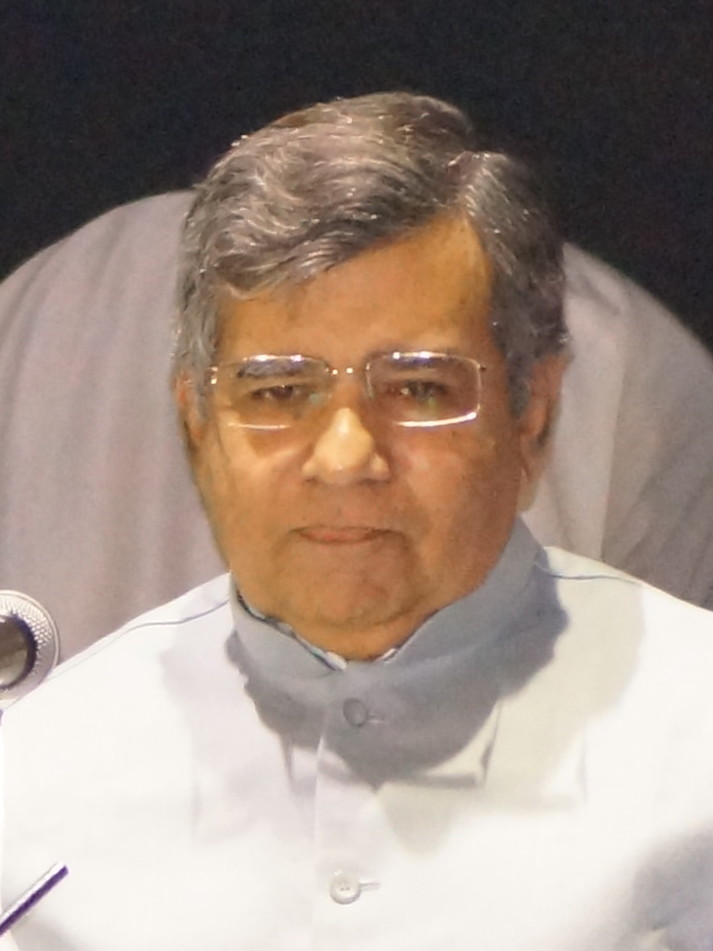
- Nagendra Vijay at inauguration of Sarthak Prakashan, 2013
- Born: 15 December 1944 (age 81)
- Occupations: Science journalist, editor
- Children: Vishal Vasu, Harshal Pushkarna
- Parent: Vijaygupta Maurya

Nagendra Vijay (born 15 December 1944) is an Indian science writer in Gujarati language. He is a son of pioneering journalist and science writer Vijaygupta Maurya. He founded the first science magazine in the Gujarati language called Scope and wrote several books. The Nagendra Vijay Science Foundation also launched the English-language science magazine Safari, in March 2008, of which he is the Editor-in-Chief. He had previously published newsweekly Flash and a science magazine Scope. He has two sons: Vishal Vasu, an IT consultant and Harshal Pushkarna, a science author.

== List of books ==
- હેમ રેડીઓ (Ham Radio - also known as Amateur Radio) (Excellent book in Gujarati language giving complete overview of Ham Radio)
- General Knowledge Factfinder (જનરલ નોલેજ ફેક્ટફાઈન્ડર) (4 volumes)
- The Great Indian Robbery (1987) (Under Name Shushi Bhatia)
- Heli no Dhumketu (1986)
- Pastime Puzzles (પાસટાઈમ પઝલ્સ) (2 volumes)
- Hydroponics (હાઇડ્રોપોનિક્સ)
- Yuddh '71 (યુદ્ધ '૭૧)
- Yuddh '65 (only digital edition)
- Einstein and Relativity (આઇનસ્ટાઈન અને સાપેક્ષવાદ)
- Vishwavigrahni yaadgar yuddhakathao (વિશ્વવિગ્રહની યાદગાર યુદ્ધકથાઓઃ volume 1 to 3)
- Mathemagic (મેથેમેજિક)
- Samaysar (સમયસર)
- Safari Jokes (સફારી જોક્સ) (part 1 to 3)
- Vismaykarak Vigyan (વિસ્મયકારક વિજ્ઞાન)
- Mosad na Jasusi missiono (મોસાદના જાસૂસી મિશનો)
- Super quiz (સુપર ક્વિઝ)
- Cosmos (કોસ્મોસ)
- Aasan Angreji (આસાન અંગ્રેજી)
- Jate banavo: Model vimaan (જાતે બનાવો: મોડેલ વિમાન volume 1-2)
- Ek vakhat evu banyu (એક વખત એવું બન્યું...)
- 20th Century: Aitihasic Sadini 50 ajod satyaghatnao (20th Century: ઐતિહાસિક સદીની ૫૦ અજોડ સત્યઘટનાઓ) (edited by : Harshal Pushkarna, his son)
- Prakriti ane Pranijagat (પ્રકૃતિ અને પ્રાણીજગત)
