= Jivram Joshi =

Indian writer of children's literature

- Born: Jivram Bhavanishankar Joshi; 6 July 1905; Garani village near Jasdan, Amreli district then under Baroda State of Gujarat
- Died: 2004; Ahmedabad, Gujarat
- Citizenship: India
- Occupation: Author
- Relatives: Bhavanishankar (father); Santokben (mother); Dinubhai Joshi (brother)
- Writing career
- Language: Gujarati
- Notable work: Miya Fuski

Jivram Bhavanishankar Joshi (6 July 1905 – 2004) was Gujarati language writer of children's literature.

== Biography ==
He was born on 6 July 1905 at Garani village near Jasdan in Amreli district then under Baroda State of Gujarat to Santokben and Bhavanishankar. He and his brother Durlabhji were introduced at the school in Panosara village. His father died when he was studying in the third standard. He went to Ahmedabad from Saurashtra at early age. He was educated in Balwantray Thakore's Proprietary School near Teen Darwaza, Ahmedabad. He worked as cook at home of Ramnarayan V. Pathak. Inspired by the life of Dharmananda Damodar Kosambi, he went to Kashi in North India. He studied Sanskrit and English languages in 1927 at Kashi. He was introduced to Kashi Vidyapith also. He was involved in Indian independence movement. He evaded his arrest by moving to Bihar and later to Gujarat. He later started writing children's literature. He edited Zagmag, a Gujarati children's weekly.

He died in 2004 at Ahmedabad, Gujarat.

== Works ==
Joshi wrote abundance of literature for children. He created several fictional characters which became popular among children like Miya Fuski, Chhako Mako, Chhel Chhabo, Adukiyo Dadukiyo. He wrote series of episodes on these characters like 30 episodes of Miya Fuski, 10 episodes of Chhako Mako, 10 episodes of Chhel Chhabo, 10 episodes of Adukiyo Dadukiyo. Miyan Fuski first appeared in 1946. He also wrote 20 episodes in Prerak Prasangavartavali series and 10 episodes in Bodhmala series. His selected works were published under Balsahitya Sarvasangrah in 1936. His stories of Tabha Bhatt, Rani Chatura and Raja Vikram are also popular. He wrote Ramat Gamat Geeto (play songs) (1952), songs to be sung while playing. He dramatised several of his stories like Chhako Mako (1963) and Panidar Moti (a bright pearl) (1965).

Adukiyo Dadukiyo ane Galu Jaadugar was adapted into Gujarati film in 2008. Miya Fuski characters are adapted into plays, TV series and a film.

Industrialist Rashmin Majithia's company Zen Opus holds copyrights of 125 story collections and characters created by Joshi. Majithia has announced the adaptation of these works in other media.

== See also ==
- List of Gujarati-language writers
