= Sanosara =

Coordinates: 21.73°N 71.76°E

Sanosara is a village located in India in the Bhavnagar district. Its approximate population is 15,000 people. It is home to an agricultural college named Lokbharti.
