= Ramanlal Soni =

Indian writer (1908–2006)

- Born: 25 January 1908; Kokapur near Modasa, Gujarat, India
- Died: 20 September 2006 (aged 98); Ahmedabad, Gujarat
- Occupation: Author
- Spouse: Rasikbala
- Children: Dr Shriram Soni, Dr Jayram Soni, Pratima Mody
- Writing career
- Language: Gujarati
- Notable awards: Ranjitram Suvarna Chandrak

Ramanlal Pitambardas Soni (25 January 1908 – 20 September 2006), also known by his pen name Sudamo, was a children's writer, translator, and social worker from Gujarat, India. He authored primarily in Gujarati language.

== Biography ==
He was born on 25 January 1908 in Kokapur near Modasa in north Gujarat. He completed his school education in Modasa. In 1940, he completed a BA from Agra University. He came back to Modasa and joined Modasa high school as a principal. He left a job in 1945 to be involved in social work. He went to Yerwada Central Jail during satyagraha movement in 1932 where he learned Bengali language. Later, he served as a member of the legislative assembly of Bombay state from 1952 to 1957. He was married to Rasikbala Soni and had three children. Dr Shriram, Jayram and Pratima. Doctor by profession, his eldest son Shriram is married to anesthesiologist and renowned Gujarati-Odiya translator Dr Renuka Soni. He died on 20 September 2006 at Ahmedabad.

== Works ==
He wrote original as well as translated and adapted children's literature. He wrote stories, poems, rhymes, plays, and biographies for them. Many of his stories and poems were published in the Zagmag column of Gujarat Samachar in the 1990s. His autobiography titled Rakh nu Pankhi was published in 1999. He translated Bengali literature into Gujarati. Some notable works include Gora, Chokher Bali, Rajarshi by Rabindranath Tagore; Shrikant by Sarat Chandra Chattopadhyay. He also translated works of Tarashankar Bandopadhyay and Ishwar Chandra Vidyasagar.

== Awards ==
He was awarded Ranjitram Suvarna Chandrak, the highest literary award in the Gujarati language, in 1996. He also received Gujarat Gaurav Puraskar by the Government of Gujarat in 1999.

== See also ==
- List of Gujarati-language writers
