= Safari (magazine) =

Indian monthly magazine

- Cover page of Safari
- Editor: Nagendra Vijay
- Categories: General Knowledge
- Frequency: Monthly
- Publisher: Nagendra Vijay
- First issue: 1 August 1980
- Final issue: 1 June 2025
- Company: Harshal Publication
- Country: India
- Language: Gujarati
- Website: Harshal Publications

Safari (Gujarati: સફારી) was a monthly science and general knowledge magazine published in Gujarati and English language, by Harshal Publications, Ahmedabad in Gujarat, India. It was edited and published by Nagendra Vijay.

== History ==
Safari Magazine was first published on 1 August 1980 by Nagendra Vijay. It was the first magazine of its kind from Gujarat. After its sixth issue, its publishing was closed. It was relaunched in July 1986. Again, after tenth issue, its publishing was closed. Finally, in May 1992, the magazine was relaunched again.

Harshal Publications is a publishing house, known for its informative books and periodicals that educate and enhance creative thinking in younger generation.

Safari launched its English edition in 2008 which is available in most parts of India. It was stopped in 2015.

On May 28, 2025, Nagendra Vijay announced that issue 369 will be the last issue of the magazine due to lack of subscribers of the magazine. He wanted to reach to the 400 editions.

== Content ==
Apart from popular science articles, the magazine also contained articles on history, current affairs, hobbies and defense matters. It was a very popular magazine among young children, students as well as elders. The tagline of the magazine read "બુદ્ધિશાળી વાચકો માટે નું મેગેઝીન" meaning "A magazine for intelligent readers". History is featured under the title "એક વખત એવું બન્યું " (Once upon a time). The magazine featured puzzles ranging from easy to difficult, quiz, quick facts (titled in magazine as fact-finder and Super-quiz) as well as jokes. It also updated the knowledge of readers by the Section 'નવું સંશોધન' means 'New Research'.

== Reception ==
The magazine received mixed reception by the public. While at limited circulation in Gujarat and Maharashtra, where general public interest is in economic and current affairs, the magazine struggled in initial years of publication. Over the years it was praised for delivering quality content and was one of the few monthly science magazine published by private sector in India.
