= Gujarat Vidyapith =

University in Ahmedabad, Gujarat, India

Coordinates: 23°2′6″N 72°34′6″E

- ગૂજરાત વિદ્યાપીઠ
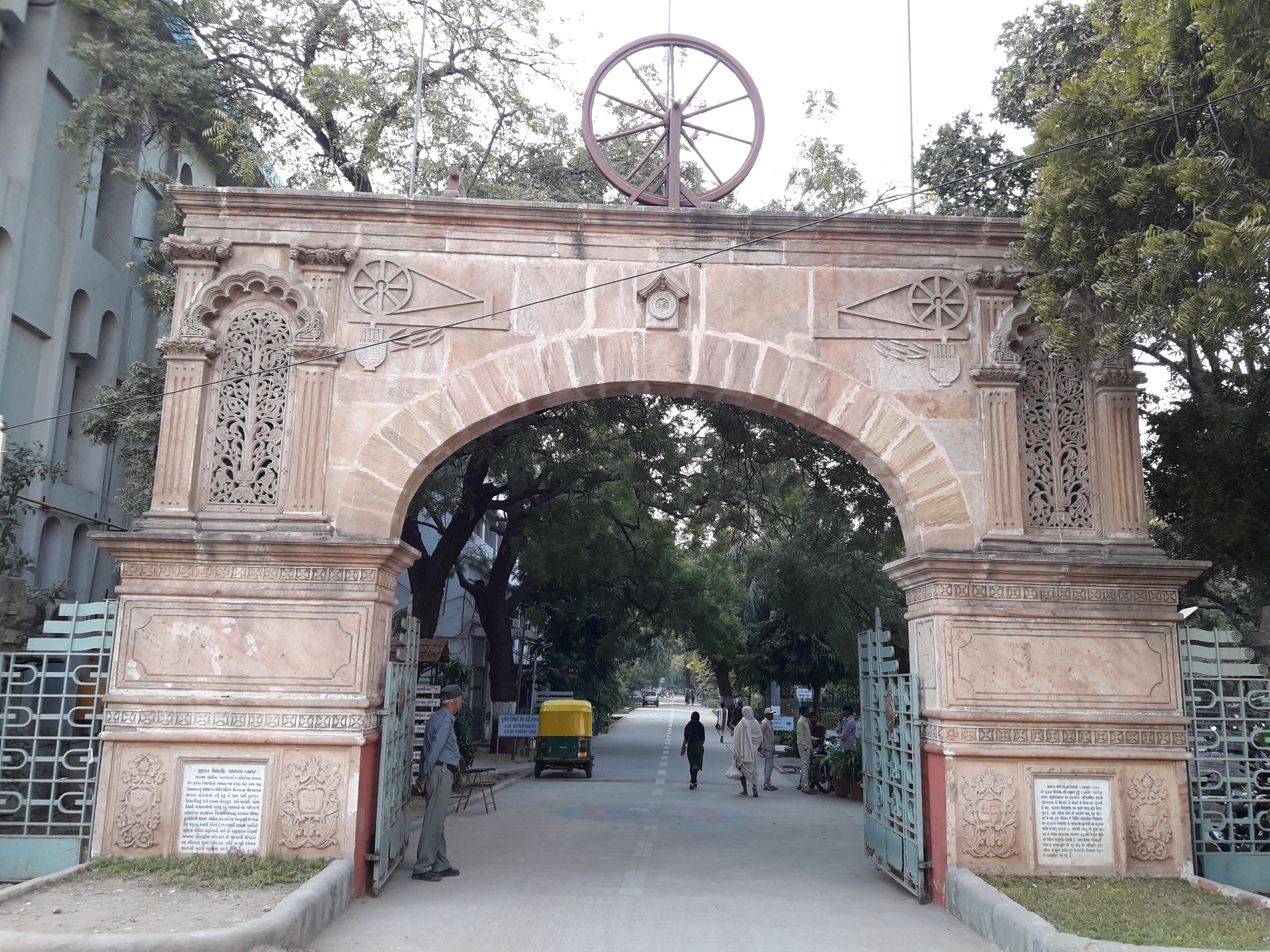
- Gujarat Vidyapith Entrance gate
- Motto: सा विद्या या विमुक्तये
- Type: Public Deemed
- Established: 18 October 1920; 105 years ago
- Founder: Mahatma Gandhi
- Affiliations: UGC
- Chancellor: Acharya Devvrat
- Vice-Chancellor: Dr. Harshad A. Patel
- Location: Gujarat Vidyapeeth Nr. Income Tax Office, Ashram Road, Ahmedabad - 380009, Gujarat, India
- Campus: Urban
- Website: gujaratvidyapith.ac.in

Gujarat Vidyapith is a deemed university in Ahmedabad, Gujarat, India. This institute was founded in 1920 by Mahatma Gandhi, India's "Father of the Nation" and the leader of the Indian independence movement. It has been deemed university since 1963.

== Etymology ==
"Vidyapith," in many languages of India, means university.

== History ==
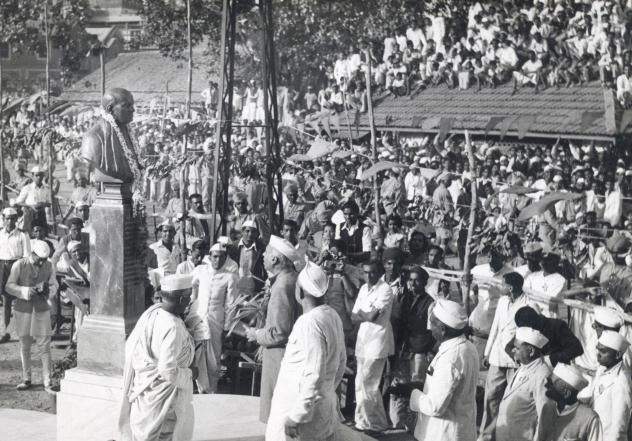
Jawaharlal Nehru during his visit to Gujarat Vidyapith, February 1949

The university was founded on 18 October 1920 as a 'Rashtriya Vidyapith' ('National University') by Mahatma Gandhi, who would serve throughout his life as the kulpati (chancellor) and all needs of Fund collected by sardar Vallabhbhai Patel by his personal relations and capacity.

The Gujarat Vidyapith was started in Dahyabhai Mehta's bungalow behind the Kocharab Ashram (the Kocharab Aashram was started in barrister Jivanlal Desai's bungalow).

Its purpose was to promote educational institutions run by Indians for Indians outside the financial and governing control of British authorities. The university helped nationalists establish a system of education for all Indians, thus proving the country's independence from British-run institutions and de-legitimizing the British Raj. Its foundation was one of the important event of an initiative satyagraha launched by Gandhi as a means to peacefully terminate British rule in India.

The vidyapith's foundation was emulated by nationalists in Benares, Bombay, Calcutta, Nagpur, Madras and in many cities across India. Answering Gandhi's call to boycott British institutions, influences and goods, many thousands of students and teachers left British colleges to join the Vidyapith.

People like Jivatram Kripalani and Nanabhai Bhatt volunteered to teach.

The Gujarat Vidyapith became a 'deemed university' in 1963. It is funded and governed by the University Grants Commission, under the Union Ministry for Human Resources Development in New Delhi. Although considerably modernized in its structure and curriculum, the university maintains its commitment to Gandhian ideals, human studies, social service and development work.

== Goals ==
The institution officially embraced Gandhi's goals as its mission:

- Adherence to truth and non-violence
- Participation in productive work with a sense of dignity of labour
- Acceptance of equality of religions
- Priority for the needs of village dwellers in all curricula
- Use of mother-tongue as a medium of instructions

== Central facilities and administration ==
The university offers a wide range of degrees, including Ph.D. programs and doctoral studies. Institute's central library has grown over the years to become one of the richest repositories of books, journals and manuscripts in Gujarat. As of March 2022, central library has a collection of 5,93,533 books, 252 journals, 17 newspapers and 691 manuscripts. Institute has 7 boys hostels and 3 girls hostels. It continues to emphasize social service, Gandhian studies and subjects associated with religion and culture.

== List of chancellors of Gujarat Vidyapith ==
The following have held the post of the Chancellor of Gujarat Vidyapith.

No.	Portrait	Name	Term of office			Remarks
1		Mahatma Gandhi	18 October 1920	30 January 1948	27 years, 104 days	Freedom fighter & President of the Indian National Congress (1924–1925)
2		Vallabhbhai Patel	14 June 1948	15 December 1950	2 years, 184 days	Deputy Prime Minister of India (1947–1950)
3		Dr. Rajendra Prasad	14 March 1951	28 February 1963	11 years, 351 days	President of India (1950–1962)
4		Morarji Desai	16 June 1963	10 April 1995	31 years, 298 days	Prime Minister of India (1977–1979)
5		Ramlal Parikh	23 June 199	21 November 1999	3 years, 151 days	
6		Dr. Sushila Nayair	26 June 2000	3 January 2001	191 days	Union Minister of Health and Family Welfare (1962–1967)
7		Navinchandra Barot	26 June 2001	1 August 2002	1 year, 36 days	
8		Navalbhai Shah	4 October 2002	15 February 2003	134 days	
9		Ravindra Varma	18 July 2003	09 October 2006	3 years, 83 days	Union Minister of Labour & Parliamentary Affairs (1977–1979)
10		Narayan Desai	23 July 2007	7 March 2015	7 years, 227 days	Eminent author
11		Ela Ramesh Bhatt	7 March 2015	19 October 2022	7 years, 211 days	Member of Parliament, Rajya Sabha (1986–1988)
12		Acharya Devvrat	20 October 2022	Incumbent	3 years, 276 days	Governor of Gujarat (2019–Incumbent)
