= Saroop Dhruv =

Gujarati poet (born 1948)

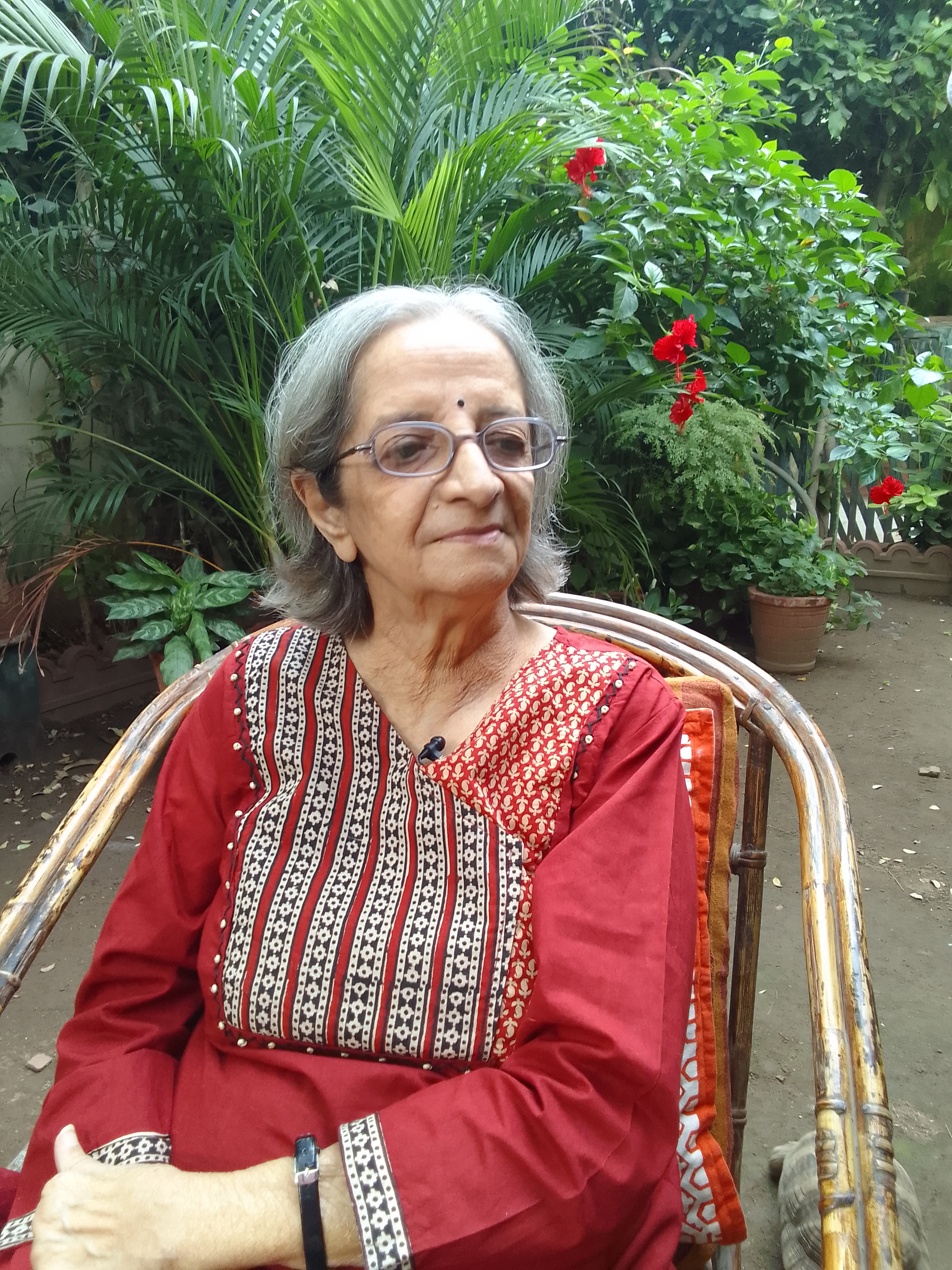
- Dhruv in Ahmedabad; August 2023
- Born: 19 June 1948 (age 78); Ahmedabad, Bombay State (now Gujarat), India
- Education: St. Xavier's College, Gujarat University
- Occupations: Educator, poet, activist

Academic background
- Thesis: A Study of Motif and its Investigation in Selected Gujarati Folk-tales (1976)
- Doctoral advisor: Mohanbhai Patel

Saroop Dhruv (born 19 June 1948) is an educator, poet and activist from Gujarat, India.

== Life ==
She was born in Ahmedabad on 19 June 1948. She completed B.A. in Gujarati and Sanskrit from St. Xavier's College, Ahmedabad in 1969 and M.A. from School of Languages, Gujarat University in 1971. She received Ph.D. from Gujarat Vidyapith in 1976 for her dissertation, Motif no Abhyas Ane Ketlik Pasand Kareli Gujarati Lokkathama Teni Tapas (Study of Motifs and its Research in Selected Gujarati Folktales). She was a Gujarati language teacher at St. Xavier's Education Center from 1974.

Dhruv was a founding member of the cultural group Samvedan Sanskritic Manch and of the media group Darshan; both groups have social change as an objective. She is also a founder of Kalam, which provides an outlet for women writers. She also writes and directs plays.

== Works ==
In 1982, she published her first collection of poems Mara Hathni Vaat (It is all in my hand). In 1995, she published a second collection of poems Salagti Havao (Burning flames). Her other poetry collections are Hastakshep (Intervention, 2003) and Sahiyara Surajni Khojma (2003).

English translations of her poems have appeared in the collections In their Own Voice (1990), Women Writing in India (1995) and Modern Gujarati Poetry: A Selection (1998).

She had edited and published some research works including Sabarmati Puchhe Chhe (1986), Kalmukho Andhar Bhedva Vol. I-VI (2003), Heerno Hinchko: Bhalbarani Dalit Mahilao Dwara Gavata Geeto (2001) and Ummeed (2007).

== Awards ==
She received an award from the Gujarati Sahitya Parishad for her first poetry collection, Mara Hathni Vat (1982). In 1996, she received the Mahendra Bhagat Award. She was awarded the Hellman/Hammett Award for Courageous Writing for 2008 by the Human Rights Watch for resisting state censorship in Gujarat and her social work. She received Takhtasinh Parmar Prize (1982-83) for Mara Hathni Vaat.

== See also ==
- List of Gujarati-language writers
