= Thomas J. Pucadyil =

Indian biologist and biochemist

- Born: 20 November 1976 (age 49); Kerala, India
- Education: St. Xavier's College, Ahmedabad; Maharaja Sayajirao University of Baroda; Centre for Cellular and Molecular Biology; Scripps Research
- Known for: Studies on membrane biochemistry and vesicular transport
- Awards: 2018 Shanti Swarup Bhatnagar Prize
- Scientific career
- Fields: Molecular biology; Biochemistry
- Workplaces: Centre for Cellular and Molecular Biology; Indian Institute of Science Education and Research, Pune

Thomas John Pucadyil (born 1976) is an Indian molecular biologist, biochemist and a professor and chair of biology at the Indian Institute of Science Education and Research, Pune. Known for his studies on membrane biochemistry and vesicular transport, Pucadyil is an international research scholar of the Howard Hughes Medical Institute/Bill & Melinda Gates Foundation and a senior fellow of the Wellcome Trust- Department of Biotechnology. The Council of Scientific and Industrial Research, the apex agency of the Government of India for scientific research, awarded him the Shanti Swarup Bhatnagar Prize for Science and Technology, one of the highest Indian science awards, for his contributions to biological sciences in 2018. (Note: Long link - please select award year to see details)

== Biography ==
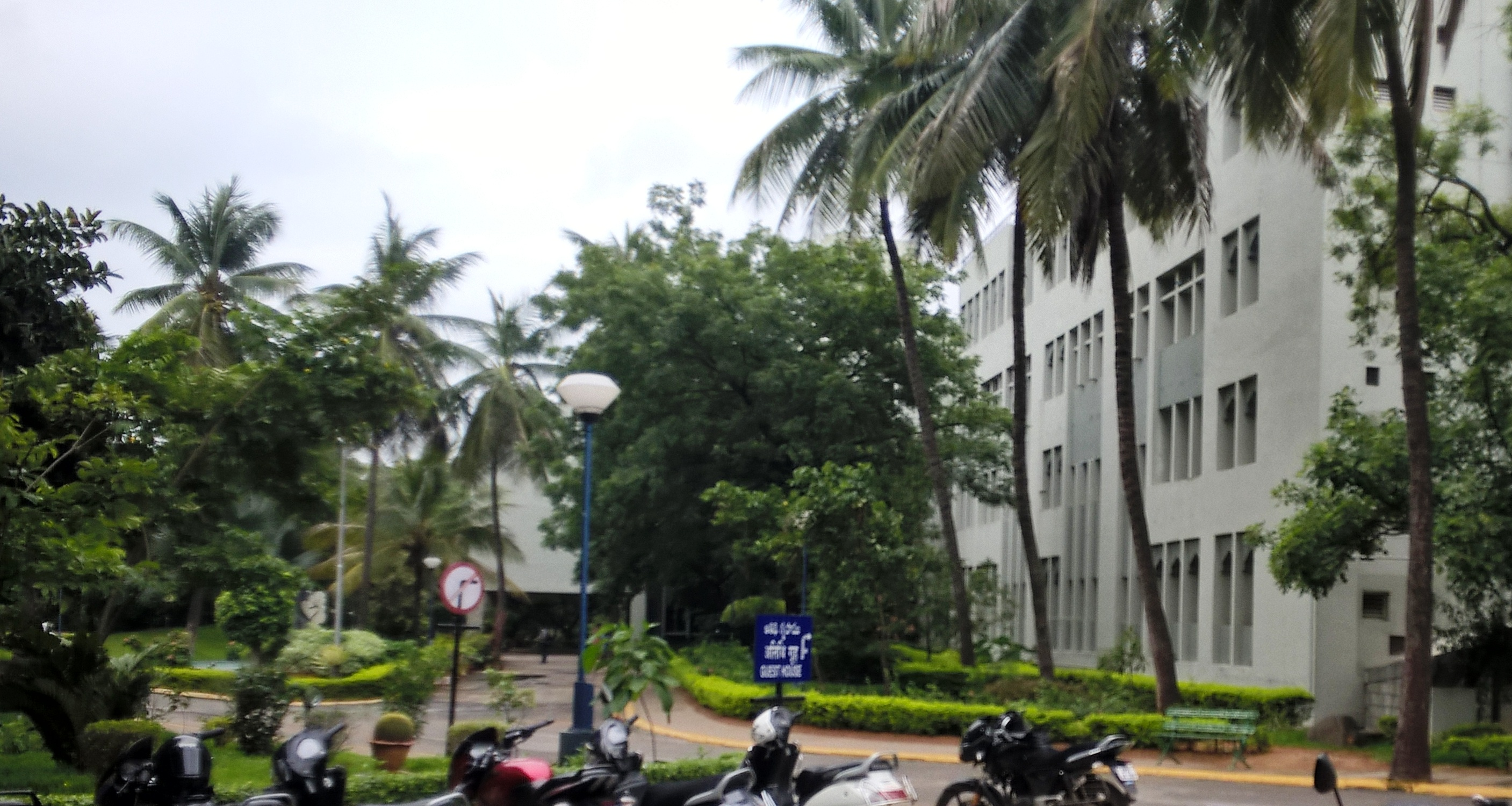
CCMB Hyderabad

Thomas J. Pucadyil, born on 20 November 1976, to renowned plasma physicist and Padma Shri recipient, P. I. John of the Pucadyil family, graduated in biochemistry from St. Xavier's College, Ahmedabad of Gujarat University in 1997 and earned his master's degree from Maharaja Sayajirao University of Baroda in 1999. Subsequently, he enrolled for doctoral studies at the Centre for Cellular and Molecular Biology, Hyderabad and served as a National Brain Research Council postdoctoral fellow at CCMB for a year from 2004 to 2005. After securing the PhD in 2005, he moved to the US to join Scripps Research, as a post doctoral fellow where he worked as a Leukemia & Lymphoma Society fellow from 2007 to 2010. Returning to India in 2010, he joined the Indian Institute of Science Education and Research, Pune (IISER Pune) as an assistant professor and holds the position of an associate professor since 2016.

== Research ==
Pucadyil's research-focus is in the field of reconstruction biology and he leads a laboratory, Pucadyil Lab, at IISER Pune where he hosts several researchers who are involved in the studies of the rational design principles behind the formation of vesicles inside living cells. His studies have been documented by way of a number of articles; (Note: Please see Selected bibliography section) ResearchGate, an online repository of scientific articles has listed 85 of them.

== Awards and honours ==
Pucadyil, a member of the Guha Research Conference, has held such fellowships as DST-SERB fellowship (2016), Wellcome Trust/DBT India Alliance intermediate fellowship (2016) and the Career Development Grant of the Leukemia & Lymphoma Society (2007). In 2011, he received the associate-ship of the Indian Academy of Sciences, followed by the Wellcome Trust/DBT India Alliance senior fellowship in 2017. The same year, he was chosen for the International Research Scholar's Grant of the Howard Hughes Medical Institute and Bill & Melinda Gates Foundation, the only Indian among the 41 recipients to receive the US$ 65,000 grant that year. The Council of Scientific and Industrial Research awarded him the Shanti Swarup Bhatnagar Prize, one of the highest Indian science awards in 2018.

== Selected bibliography ==
- Frolov, Vadim A.; Schmid, Sandra L.; Zimmerberg, Joshua; Pucadyil, Thomas J.; Akimov, Sergey A.; Bashkirov, Pavel V.; Shnyrova, Anna V. (22 March 2013). "Geometric Catalysis of Membrane Fission Driven by Flexible Dynamin Rings". Science. 339 (6126): 1433–1436. Bibcode:2013Sci...339.1433S. doi:10.1126/science.1233920. ISSN 1095-9203. PMC 3980720. PMID 23520112.
- Jafurulla, Md.; Bandari, Suman; Pucadyil, Thomas J.; Chattopadhyay, Amitabha (1 April 2017). "Sphingolipids modulate the function of human serotonin1A receptors: Insights from sphingolipid-deficient cells". Biochimica et Biophysica Acta (BBA) - Biomembranes. 1859 (4): 598–604. doi:10.1016/j.bbamem.2016.10.016. ISSN 0005-2736. PMID 27984018.
- Pucadyil, Thomas J.; Kamerkar, Sukrut C.; Dar, Srishti (2017). "Use of the supported membrane tube assay system for real-time analysis of membrane fission reactions". Nature Protocols. 12 (2): 390–400. doi:10.1038/nprot.2016.173. ISSN 1750-2799. PMID 28125102. S2CID 3843167.
- Mukhopadhyay, Amitabha; Pucadyil, Thomas J.; Kamerkar, Sukrut C.; Kumar, Kamal; Lomash, Richa Madan; Kapoor, Anjali; Singh, Pawan Kishor (3 December 2018). "Salmonella SipA mimics a cognate SNARE for host Syntaxin8 to promote fusion with early endosomes". J Cell Biol. 217 (12): 4199–4214. doi:10.1083/jcb.201802155. ISSN 1540-8140. PMC 6279372. PMID 30309979.
- Pucadyil, Thomas J.; Srivastava, Anand; Babu, Kavita; Dar, Srishti; Kadam, Nagesh Y.; Kamerkar, Sukrut C.; Kushwah, Manish S.; Deo, Raunaq (5 December 2018). "ATP-dependent membrane remodeling links EHD1 functions to endocytic recycling". Nature Communications. 9 (1): 5187. Bibcode:2018NatCo...9.5187D. doi:10.1038/s41467-018-07586-z. ISSN 2041-1723. PMC 6281616. PMID 30518883.

== See also ==
- Transport vesicles
- Fission
