= St. Xavier's College, Ahmedabad =

Institution of higher education in Ahmedabad, Gujarat, India

St. Xavier's College Ahmedabad
- Coat of Arms
- Type: Roman Catholic Religious Minority Research Grant-in-Aid Coeducational Autonomous Higher Education Institution
- Established: 20 June 1955; 71 years ago
- Founders: Fr. Charles Gomes, S.J.
- Religious affiliation: Roman Catholic (Jesuits)
- Academic affiliations: UGC, Gujarat University
- Chairperson: Fr. Durai Fernand, S.J.
- President: Fr. Durai Fernand, S.J.
- Vice-president: Fr. Antony Pichai, S.J.
- Rector: Fr. Antony Pichai, S.J.
- Principal: Dr. Sebastian Vadakan
- Director: Fr. Dr. David Roy, S.J.
- Students: 3200
- Location: Navrangpura Ahmedabad, Gujarat, Gujarat, India; 23°1′58.1″N 72°33′6.08″E
- Campus: 26 acres
- Nickname: Xavierite
- Website: sxca.edu.in
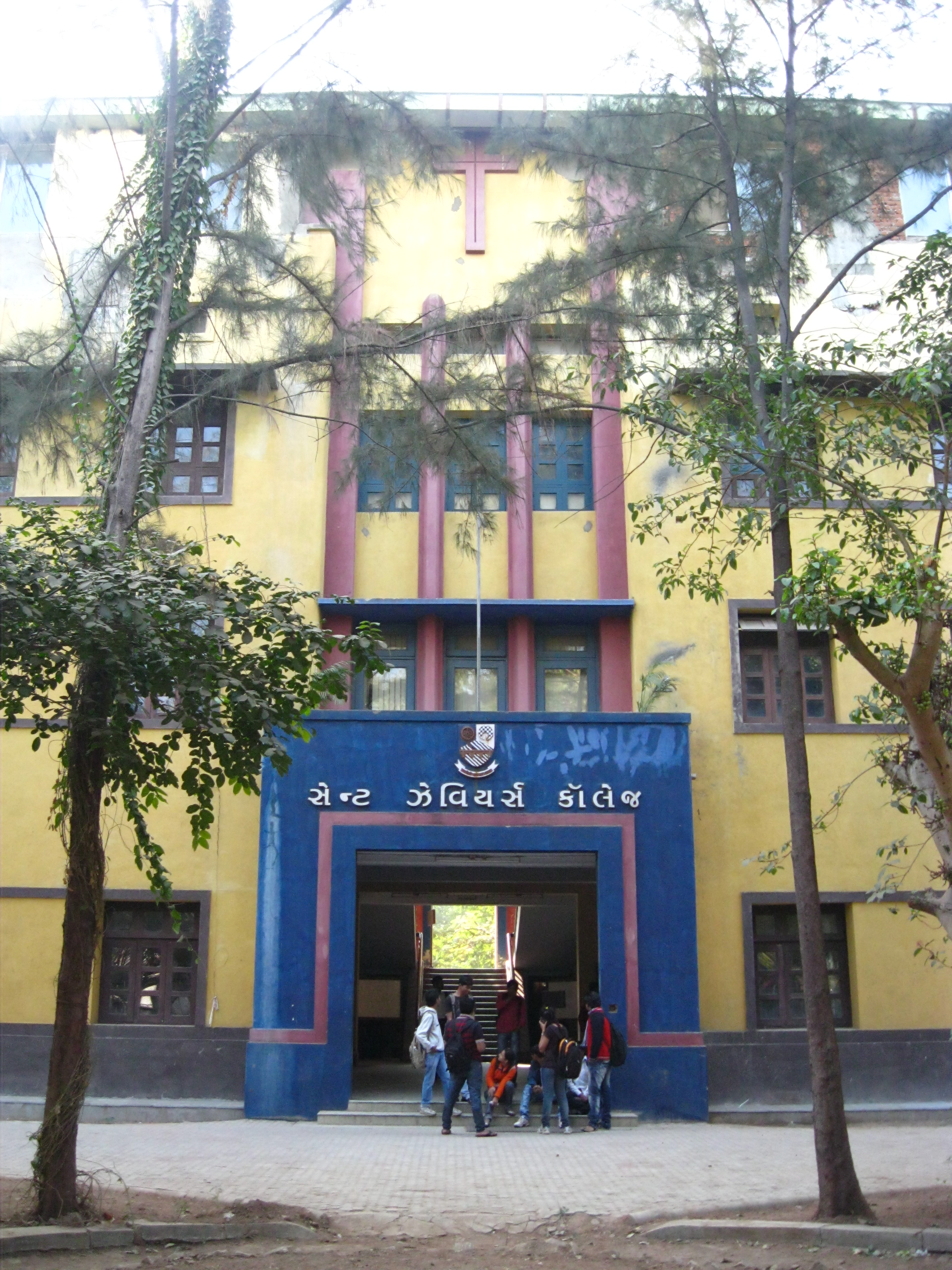

St. Xavier's College Ahmedabad (SXCA) is a Christian minority institution of higher education in Ahmedabad, Gujarat, India. It was founded in 1955 by the Gujarat Jesuits of the Society of Jesus (Jesuits) and is the only grant-in-aid Christian college in Ahmedabad.

== History ==
The main college building was designed by Atmaram Gajjar in 1956.

== Accreditation and rankings ==
In 2001, the National Assessment and Accreditation Council (NAAC) accredited SXCA with five stars. In 2007, NAAC reaccredited SXCA with A+ in 2013 NAAC reaccredited SXCA with A (CGPA 3.41) and in 2022 with A (CGPA 3.27). In 2019, SXCA received first rank in the Gujarat State Institutional Rating Framework (GSIRF) among colleges, but fell to second in 2020, receiving five stars on each occasion.

The National Institutional Ranking Framework Ranking (National Level) placed SXCA in 2018 in the 65th, in 2019 in the 56th, in 2020 in the 59th, in 2021 in the 57th rank, in 2022 52nd Rank, in 2023 96th.

College rankings

General – India
- NIRF (Colleges) (2022): 52

St. Xavier's College (Autonomous) has been ranked among the top 50 colleges consistently by India Today rankings and other frameworks at the national level and the first rank at the city and state levels. The India today's ranking are given below.

== Academics ==
The college offers courses at the undergraduate and postgraduate levels.

=== Undergraduate courses ===
Bachelor of Arts

- Economics
- English
- Gujarati.
- Psychology
- Sociology
- Sanskrit

Bachelor of Commerce

- BCom BPS
- BCom General

Bachelor of Computer Applications

Bachelor of Science

- Biochemistry
- Biotechnology
- Botany
- Computer Science
- Chemistry
- Electronics
- Mathematics
- Physics
- Statistics
- Zoology
- Information Technology

=== Postgraduate courses ===
Master of Arts

- English
- Psychology

Master of Science

- Artificial Intelligence
- Analytical Chemistry
- Big Data Analytics
- Biotechnology
- Biochemistry
- Mathematics
- Organic Chemistry
- Physics

== Notable alumni ==
- Parveen Babi - actress
- Dr.Mallika Sarabhai - dancer and Activist
- Rajeev Khandelwal - actor
- Dr Rita Kothari - author
- Dr Thomas J. Pucadyil - Scientist
- Geet Sethi - billiards player
- Charles Borromeo - Sports, Arjuna Award
- Ramon Chibb - Filmmaker
- Saroop Dhruv - Poet
- Rohit Roy - actor
- Deeksha Joshi - actress
- Aditya Lakhia - actor
- Sangita Jindal - Indian Business woman and art curator

== See also ==
- List of Jesuit educational institutions
