= Jasuben Pizza =

Pizza parlor in Ahmedabad, india

- Industry: Restaurants
- Founded: 1975
- Headquarters: Ahmedabad, Gujarat, India
- Area served: Ahmedabad
- Key people: Jasuben, Andarben, Joravar Singh Rajput
- Products: Pizza, Vada pav Hotdogs

Jasuben Pizza is a pizza parlor in Ahmedabad, a city in Gujarat, a state in Western India. It is located in the Law garden area and was opened by a woman named Jasuben Shah (ben is an honorific title given to women in Gujarati) after she got married and migrated from Pune to Ahmedabad in 1976. After the business became a success, she and her family expanded to six branches in the city. Although Jasuben moved back to Pune in the '90s, her business partner Joravar Singh Rajput still runs the business in Ahmedabad. A lot of media attention came in 2013 after Gujarat's chief minister, Narendra Modi, called it a prime example of female entrepreneurship in his speech at FICCI.

== History ==
It is reported that Jasuben started this business in 1990s with a couple named Andarben and Jorawar Singh Rajput. After they started making pizzas, Jasuben moved back to Pune where she lived earlier but Andarben continued to run the business. It was Andarben who later developed a "secret recipe" of the sauce that is still used in their pizzas. It is also reported that at a point in time they were presumably selling more pizzas than Pizza Hut and Domino's Pizza combined within the city.

== Pizza ==
The type of pizza served is an Indianized version of the original Italian one. It has been adapted to Gujarati taste. The version served at Jasuben's uses Mainda flour, a thin crisp Indian bread as base and is laced with sweet tomato puree, finely-chopped onions and capsicum, covered with abundant amounts of local cheese and seasoned with black pepper. The oven used at their different branches was also designed and customized by Andarben and manufactured locally so that pizzas could be stacked on top of each other. The pizzeria sells 20,000 pizzas daily with each piece priced at ₹70 (75¢ US).
