= Atmaram Gajjar =

Indian architect

Atmaram Mancharam Gajjar
- Born: 1901
- Died: 1961 (aged 59–60); Ahmedabad, Gujarat, India
- Occupation: Architect

Atmaram Mancharam Gajjar (1901-1961) was an Indian architect from Ahmedabad, Gujarat.

== Biography ==
Gajjar was born in 1901. He completed his graduation from the Sir J. J. School of Art in Bombay (now Mumbai). He was one of the first generation of the architects in India who had studied the western architecture. He started his practice in Ahmedabad. His buildings show the use of contemporary western architectural as well as traditional Indian architectural elements such as stone window grilles and chhajja shades. His works were influenced by Edwin Lutyens and Vincent Esch while his late works show influence of the Bauhaus. He designed Indian Art Deco style buildings as well. He died in Ahmedabad in 1961. His office was taken over by Hasmukh Patel.

== Works ==
Following buildings in Ahmedabad were designed by him:

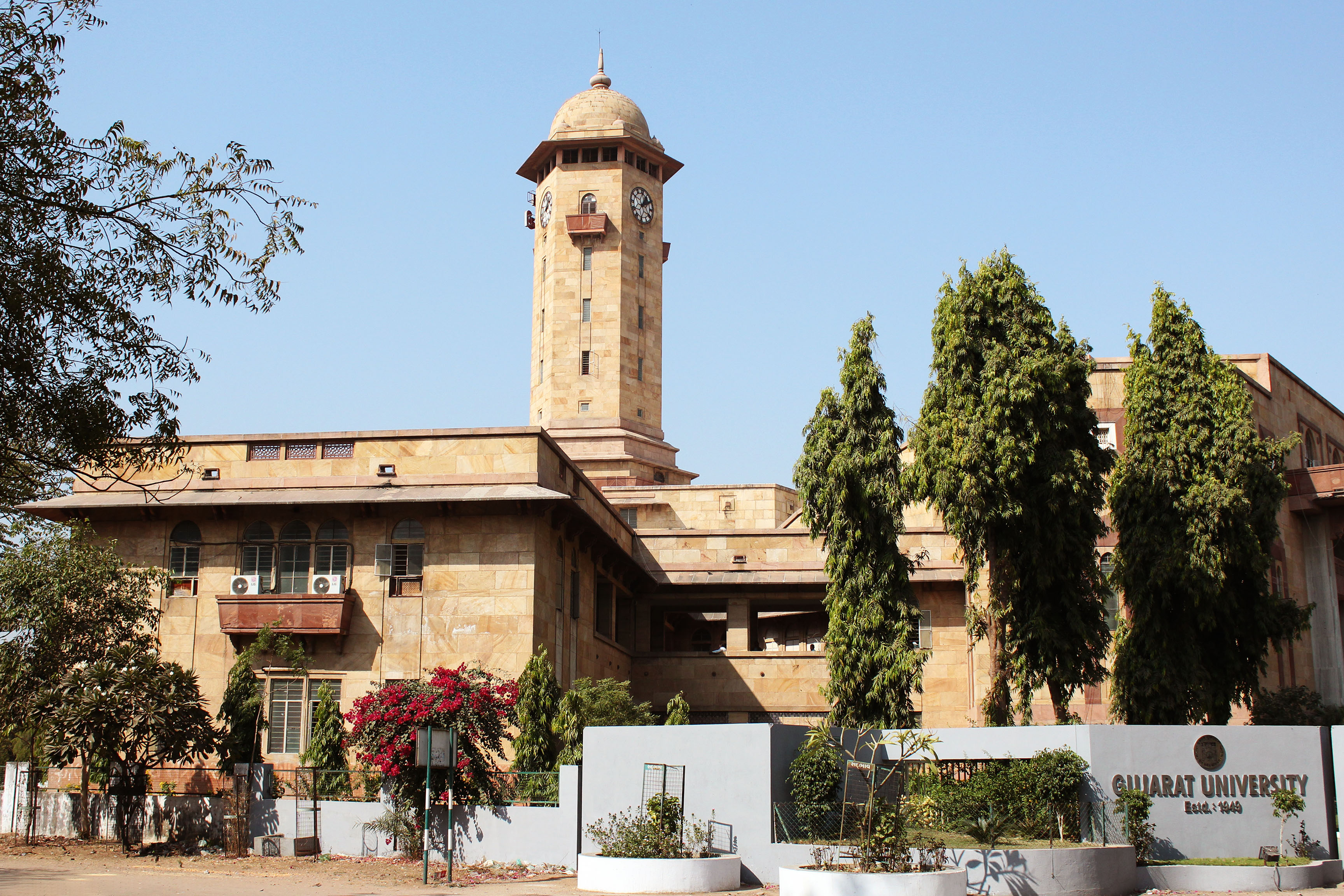
Main building of Gujarat University

- L. D. College of Arts (1937)
- Shodhan House (1939, now demolished)
- M. G. Science Institute building (1946)
- L. D. College of Pharmacy (1947)
- L. D. College of Engineering buildings (1948)
- Main building of Gujarat University (1947)
- A. G. Teachers Training College (late 1950s)
- Gajjar Hall near Law Garden
- St. Xaviers College (1956)
