= P. I. John =

Indian physicist

- Born: Kottayam, Kerala, India
- Education: Aligarh Muslim University; Physical Research Laboratory
- Known for: Experimental Plasma Physics; Aditya Tokamak; Non-Neutral Plasma; Industrial Plasma Technologies; National Fusion Program
- Awards: Padma Shri (2010)
- Scientific career
- Fields: Experimental Plasma Physics and Plasma Applications
- Workplaces: Institute for Plasma Research

Pucadyil Ittoop John, also known as John Pucadyil, is an Indian plasma physicist. He occupies the Meghnad Saha Chair in Plasma Science and Technology at the Institute for Plasma Research, Ahmedabad.

After completing his Ph.D. at Aligarh Muslim University, John joined the Physical Research Laboratory, where he established an experimental plasma physics program in 1972. He was the Chairman of the Plasma Physics Group at PRL until 1982.

John was one of the leading members of the group who initiated India’s Fusion Research Program, also known as Plasma Physics Program (PPP), which developed into the Institute for Plasma Research (IPR). He supervised, and was instrumental in, the erection and commissioning of the first indigenous Indian Tokamak, Aditya, and was also the project leader of its pulsed power systems.

In the early 1990s, he started a plasma processing program at the Institute for Plasma Research (IPR) to facilitate plasma based industrial applications, which grew into the Facilitation Centre for Industrial Plasma Technologies (FCIPT) at Gandhinagar, Gujarat, India. He was the head of FCIPT for many years, and is still a member of its governing Council.

In 2002–2003, John served as head of the Physics Section of the International Atomic Energy Agency. He was also part of the Indian Task Force for ITER negotiations, before India joined the ITER as a full member. Currently, also, he is chairman of the Board Of Research in Fusion Science & Technology (BRFST), which is involved with the National Fusion Program in India. Through the National Fusion Program, John was reported in 2010 to be "currently working on an administrative framework for funding universities and educational institutions in basic research, and human resource development in fusion science and technology."

John has close to 100 publications in international journals and holds 12 patents for plasma devices and plasma-aided manufacturing processes. His book “Plasma Sciences and the Creation of Wealth”, published by Tata McGraw-Hill in 2005 addresses a broad audience on the value addition through plasma-based technologies. A translation of this book into the Chinese language has been brought out. His second book " Plasma Processes for Energy and Environment" was published by Lambert Publishers in November 2017. He is a Fellow of the Indian Academy of Sciences and the Gujarat Academy of Science. In 2010, John received the Padma Shri award from the Government of India.

John’s interests transcend science. He paints in oils and writes poetry. His book of poetry “Feng Shui and Other Poems” has been published online. He is a mentor to InCube Ventures Ltd. Ahmedabad; the first social venture approved by SEBI. After retirement and return to Kottayam in 2013, he is actively involved with the Senior Citizens’ Forum, Kottayam and helps the elders to acquire expertise in computer and internet usage.

P. I. John is the son of Ittoop of the Pucadyil house. He is married to Minnu and has two children. His elder son, Joseph serves with the Roche Diagnostics in Switzerland as the International Business Leader; Laboratory Software Solutions. Joseph’s family consists of Janaki, his wife and Rahul their son. His second son, Thomas J. Pucadyil, a Biologist is an Associate Professor with the Indian Institute of Science Education and Research, Pune. Thomas’s family consists of his wife Shanti and their son Nikhil.
