= Ecology Park =

Urban Park in Ahmedabad, Gujarat, India

- Interactive map of Ecology Park
- Type: Urban park
- Location: Bopal-Ghuma, Ahmedabad, Gujarat, India
- Coordinates: 23.04605°N 72.45472°E
- Area: 22,000 m^{2} (5.4 acres)
- Established: 26 March 2022
- Owner: Ahmedabad Municipal Corporation
- Water: Pond
- Parking: Yes

Ecology Park is an urban park in Bopal-Ghuma neighbourhood in Ahmedabad, Gujarat, India. It is spread over an area of 22,000 square metres (5.4 acres) and was opened in March 2022.

== History ==
In 2016, the Bopal Municipality had proposed to move the waste from the illegal landfill site to Pirana dumpsite. When Ahmedabad Municipal Corporation (AMC) took over the Bopal Municipality in July 2020, the project moved forward. In July 2020, a trommel machine was installed on the site for waste processing. After six months, the 2.5 lakh tonne of waste from the 17-feet high waste dump was cleared. The development of the park was approved by the AMC in October 2020. The soil was treated and the new top soil was laid. The project cost ₹3.5 crore (US$370,000) which included ₹75 lakh (US$79,000) spent for waste clearing and ₹1 crore (US$100,000) for tree plantation and lighting. The park was inaugurated on 26 March 2022 by Union Home Minister Amit Shah.

== Features ==
The park is spread over an area of 22,000 square metres (5.4 acres). It has 8,215 square metres (2.030 acres) of land with more than 1200 trees which include all season flowering trees and plants. It has an information centre, a walkway, a children's playground and an open gym. It has 600 square metres (6,500 sq ft) pond which attracts migratory birds.

== See also ==
- Lokmanya Tilak Garden
- Parimal Garden
- Law Garden
