= Ambawadi =

- Neighbourhood
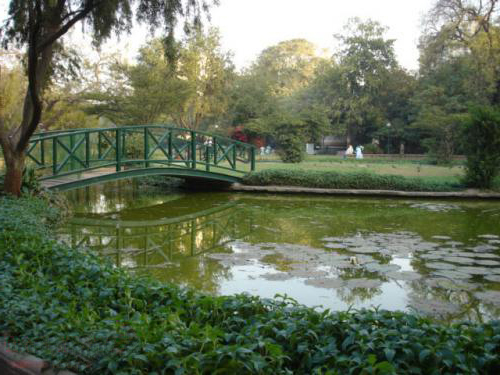
- Parimal Garden
- Country: India
- State: Gujarat
- District: Ahmedabad

Government
  - Body: Ahmedabad Municipal Corporation

Languages
  - Official: Gujarati, Hindi
- Time zone: UTC+5:30 (IST)
- PIN: 380006
- Telephone code: 91-079
- Vehicle registration: GJ
- Lok Sabha constituency: Ahmedabad
- Civic agency: Ahmedabad Municipal Corporation
- Website: gujaratindia.com

Ambawadi is an area located in Ahmedabad, India. The major landmarks of the area are the Ahmedabad Central Mall, the Ambawadi shaak bazaar (vegetable market), and the Parimal Garden.

== Education ==
- Sheth Chimanlal Nagindas Vidyalaya

== Transportation ==
- Ahmedabad Railway Station is approximately 8 km from Ambawadi.
- Gujarat State Road Transport Corporation Bus Station, Gita Mandir is approximately 5 km from Ambawadi.
- Sardar Vallabhbhai Patel International Airport is approximately 15 km from Ambawadi.
