= Lokmanya Tilak Garden =

Public garden in Ahmedabad, India

- Victoria Garden
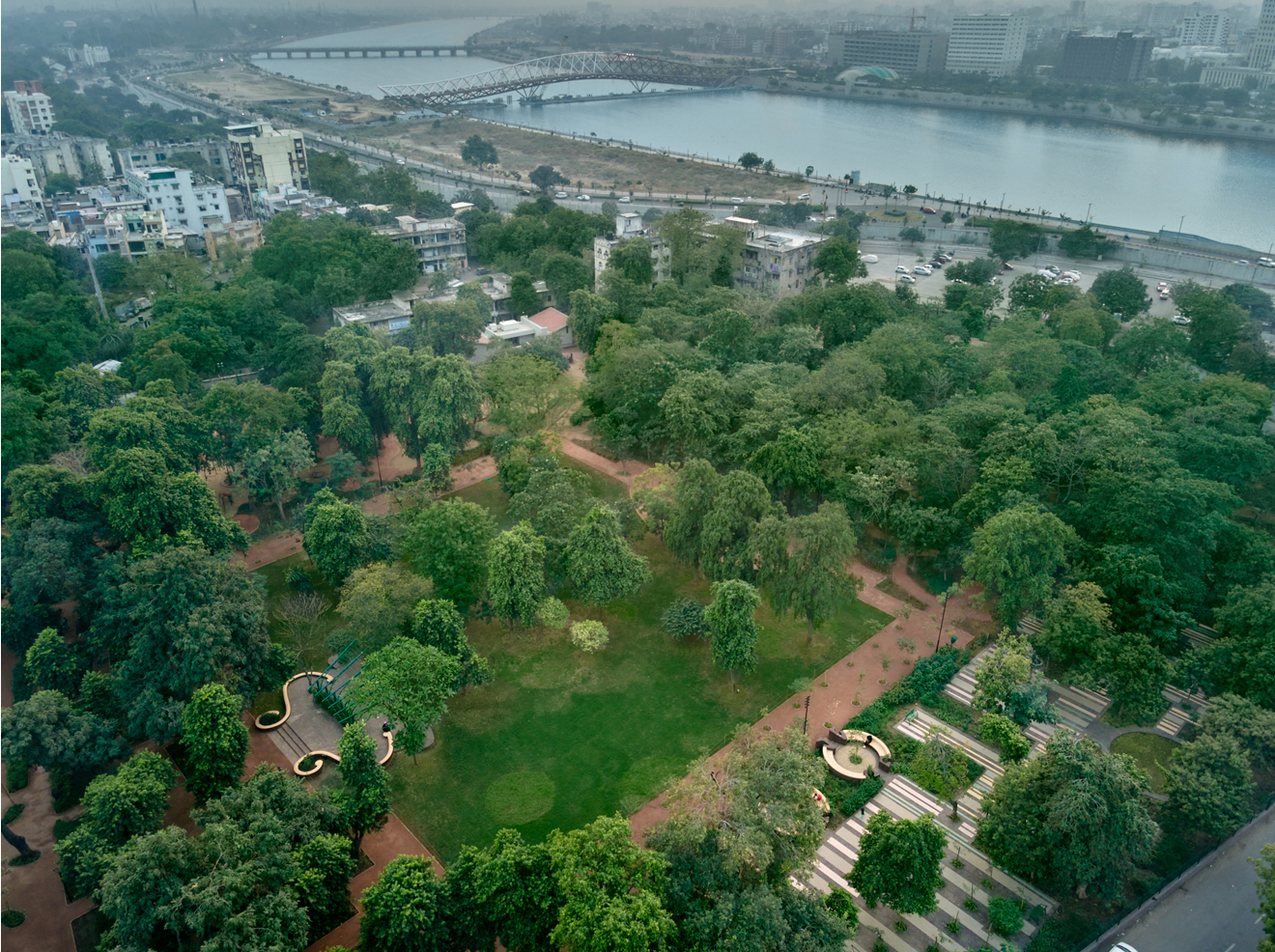
- Aerial shot of the garden
- Interactive map of Lokmanya Tilak Garden
- Type: Urban park
- Location: Ahmedabad, India
- Coordinates: 23.0214°N 72.5792°E
- Area: 28,260 square metres (304,200 sq ft)
- Opened: 1905
- Etymology: Lokamanya Tilak
- Owner: Ahmedabad Municipal Corporation
- Operator: U. N. Mehta Foundation
- Visitors: 10-11 lakh (in 2023)
- Open: 6am-12:30pm, 2pm-10:30pm
- Awards: City Beauty Competition - Green Space
- Parking: Yes
- Public transit: AMTS; BRTS

Lokmanya Tilak Garden, formerly known as Victoria Garden, is a is an urban park in Ahmedabad, Gujarat, India. It was proposed in 1897 to commemorate Queen Victoria's diamond jubilee and was opened in 1905. It has few monuments including ones dedicated to Lokmanya Tilak and Mahagujarat movement. It was renovated and refurbished in 2021. It has walkways, central lawn, bandstand, forest walk, maze garden, children's play area and civic amenities.

== Location ==
The garden is located at the east end of the Ellis Bridge which connects Old Ahmedabad on the east bank with the new city grown on the west bank of the Sabarmati River. It is located near Bhadra Fort, Jam-e-Masjid, CNI Church, I P Mission School, and Town Hall across the bridge.

== History ==
The garden was proposed by the group of elite citizens of the city on 31 May 1897 to commemorate Queen Victoria's diamond jubilee. The land of an old jail garden was handed over by the British Government to the Ahmedabad municipality in 1901. The funds were raised from the public and the government. The groundbreaking ceremony was held on 9 January 1902. The garden was opened to the public in 1905. It had a bandstand where a band performed weekly for few years from 1906. It is considered as one of the oldest gardens in India and one of the three Victoria gardens in the country; others are in Mumbai and Kolkata.

When the city was recovered from plague, on 13 December 1917, a fête was held at the garden. On 27 November 1918, a celebration of the end of the World War I was held here.

The garden became neglected over years as the city grew on the west side of the river and lost its vicinity to riverbank. It lost an area of about 2,500 square metres (27,000 sq ft) as new roads leading to Sabarmati Riverfront were built on its edges.

Starting August 2021, the garden was renovated and redesigned by Prabhakar B Bhagwat, a landscaping firm led by Aniket Bhagwat, in collaboration with the Torrent Group's non-profit arm U. N. Mehta Foundation's Pratiti initiative and Ahmedabad Municipal Corporation (AMC). The monuments were refurbished and old features of the garden were restored such as a public radio and a bandstand. The redevelopment cost ₹10 crore (US$1.0 million).

== Monuments ==
=== Queen Victoria Statue ===
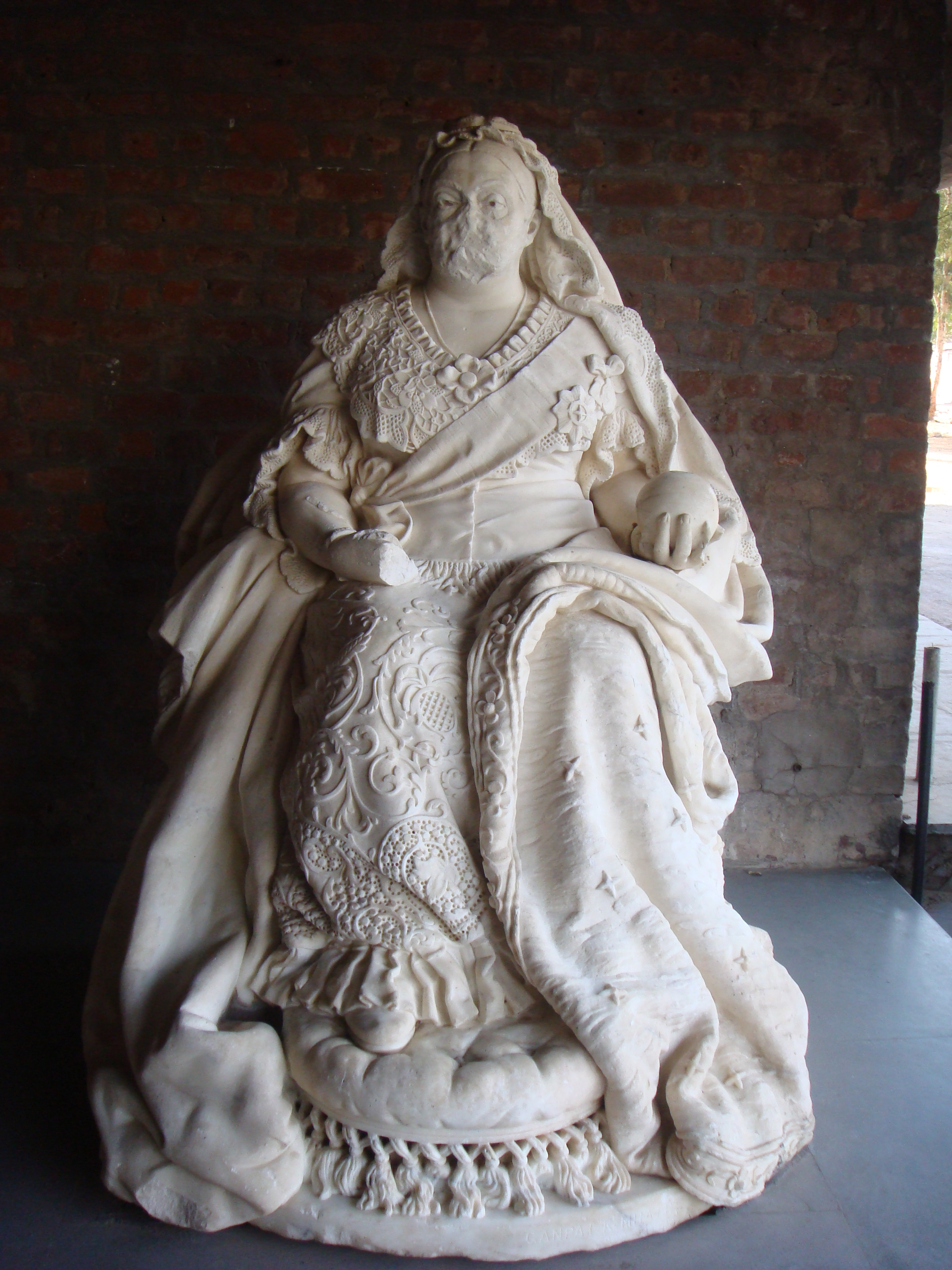
Queen Victoria statue, now in Sanskar Kendra

On 7 January 1910, a statue of Queen Victoria was installed in the garden and unveiled by Mr. Barrow, the Commissioner of Ahmedabad. It was designed and sculptured by Ganpatrao Kashinath Mhatre from Mumbai in Carrara marble. The seven-feet statue displayed the queen seated in a royal chair wearing royal robes with intricate carvings of embroidery, crown on her head and a globe and a sceptre in her hands. The stone canopy and the high back of the royal chair which shows behind the statue was made of cold-blue Indian marble. Later the statue, damaged in some parts, was moved to the Sanskar Kendra. The empty canopy still exists in the garden.

=== Lokmanya Tilak Statue ===
On 28 February 1929, Mahatma Gandhi inaugurated a bronze statue of Lokmanya Tilak in the garden. It was designed by Mahadev Kashinath Kolhatkar from Baroda. The statue was an issue of conflict between the Ahmedabad Municipality presided by Vallabhbhai Patel, and the British administrators. It cost Rs. 15000 from which Rs. 10000 were contributed by Ahmedabad Municipality and the rest was raised from the public. "Swarajya is my birth right" is engraved on its pedestal.

=== Mahagujarat Shahid Smarak ===
On 8 August 1956, some college students of Ahmedabad went to the local Congress House near Lal Darwaza to demand a separate linguistic state. The police firing resulted in the death of five to eight students. The Mahagujarat Shahid Smarak was erected in the garden to commemorate this event of the Mahagujarat movement. As this memorial was away from the Congress House where the deaths happened, it was opposed and another memorial was built near the Congress House.

=== Nanavatty Memorial Fountain ===
Dr. Byramji Hormasjee Nanavatty was the first gynecologist of city to receive a Fellowship of the Royal College of Surgeons (FRCS). Dhanbai was his wife. This Parsi couple had two daughters Frenny and Dr. Bachoo and a son Phiroze, nicknamed Ball, who died on 26 December 1910 at an age of 19. There is no information about the cause of his death. The Nanavatty Memorial Fountain was donated by the couple in 1912 commemorating the death of their son Phiroze. It was renovated at the cost of ₹4.5 lakh (US$4,700) in 2016 by the heritage department of the AMC.

The stone fountain features intricate carvings of children. At its center of the stand, there is a male face, thought to be Phiroze, though unconfirmed. Two marble plaques on the fountain bear eulogies for Phiroze in both English and Gujarati. Additionally, a Bible verse is inscribed, stating: “Until the day breaks and the shadows flee away.”

=== SEWA plaque ===
On 12 April 1972, Ela Bhatt chaired a meeting of a group of women here which resulted in the foundation of Self Employed Women's Association (SEWA). On 5 February 2023, Hillary Clinton unveiled a plaque near a banyan tree planted by Bhatt in 2022 on occasion of the 50th anniversary of SEWA.

== Features ==
The garden is spread over an area of about 28,260 square metres (304,200 sq ft). Apart from several historical monuments, it has a central lawn square with a bandstand. Other features include old water gardens, walkways, seating arrangements, a children's play area, a volleyball court, open gym, fountains, toilets, a water tank and a drinking water facility. It also has a forest walk and a maze garden. It has 2.5-km long jogging track. It is said that the garden had installed the first public radio receiver tower in Ahmedabad and is the only garden in the city still having a public radio receiver tower. It had a shooting range and rockeries in the past. There is a mazar (mausoleum) in the garden.

The garden has about 785 trees of more than 30 different species as well as more than 35,000 flowering shrubs and grasses of more than 100 species. It has a large heritage tree of baobab which is about 120-years old.

== Culture ==
Ravivari or Gujari Bazar, a flea market, gathers near the western side of the garden on every Sunday since 1950s; a tradition established since 15th century Gujarat Sultanate.

The garden is visited by 2,500 to 3,000 people every day and 10-11 lakh people per annum.

It won the first award in Green Space category in the City Beauty Competition held by the Ministry of Housing and Urban Affairs of Gujarat state in 2024.

== See also ==
- Law Garden
- Parimal Garden
- Ecology Park
