= Parimal Garden =

Urban Park in Ahmedabad, Gujarat, India

- Pari Trikamlal Bhogilal Municipal Recreation Park
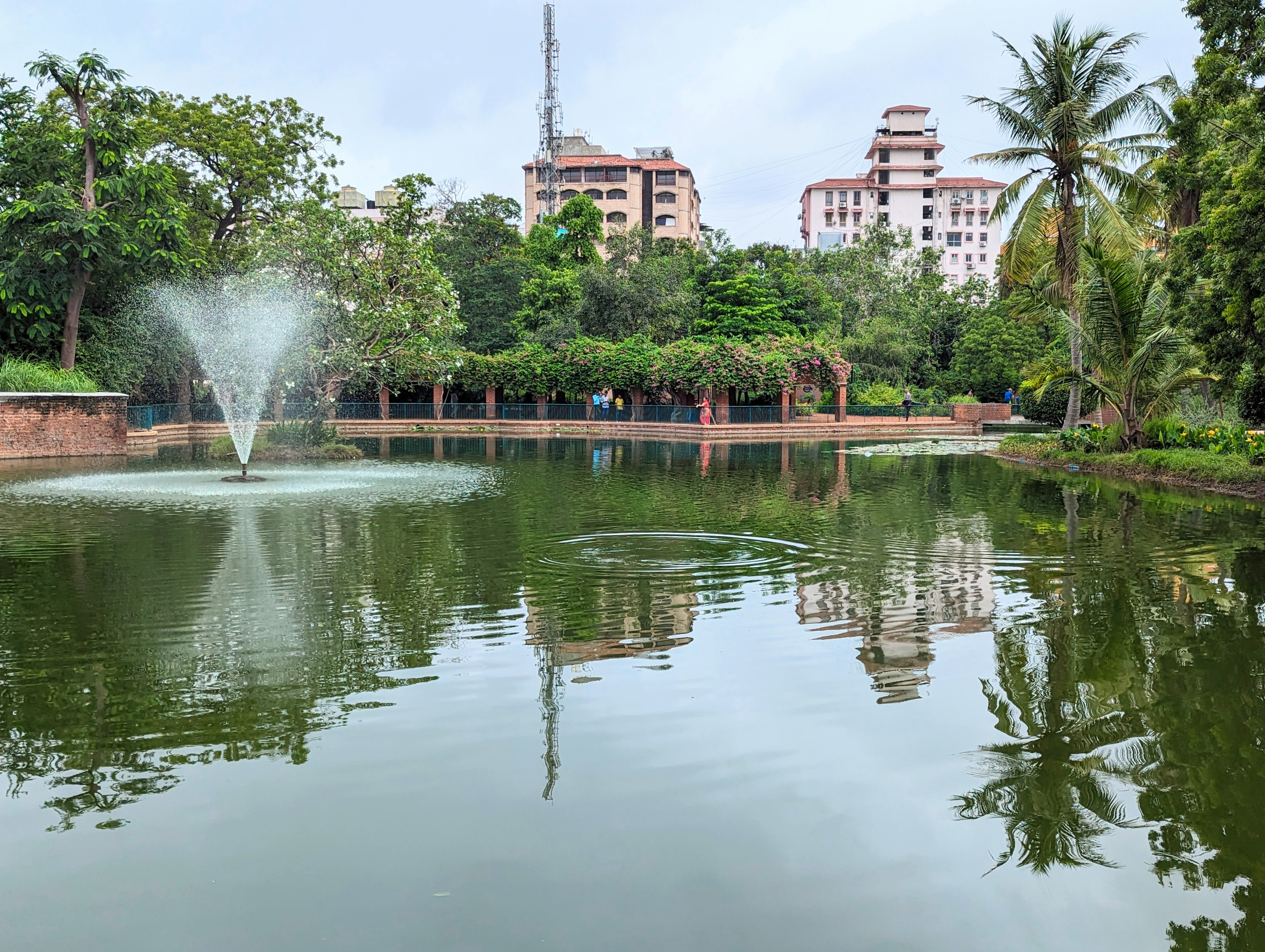
- Fountain, arbour and palm tree in Parimal Garden
- Click on the map and then on icons for details
- Type: Urban park
- Location: Ahmedabad, Gujarat, India
- Coordinates: 23.0203°N 72.5561°E
- Area: 8.5 acres (34,000 m^{2})
- Established: 1960
- Designer: Kamal Mangaldas, Aniket Bhagwat
- Owner: Ahmedabad Municipal Corporation
- Operator: Torrent Group
- Open: 06:00 am to 10:00 pm
- Water: Pond
- Parking: Yes
- Public transit: AMTS

Parimal Garden, officially known as Pari Trikamlal Bhogilal Municipal Recreation Park, is an urban park in the Ambawadi area of Ahmedabad, Gujarat, India. It covers an area of 8.5 acres (34,000 m^{2}). It was built in 1960, and redeveloped in 1998 and 2021. The park has a pond, a walkway, an amphitheatre, a gym, and sports facilities.

== History ==
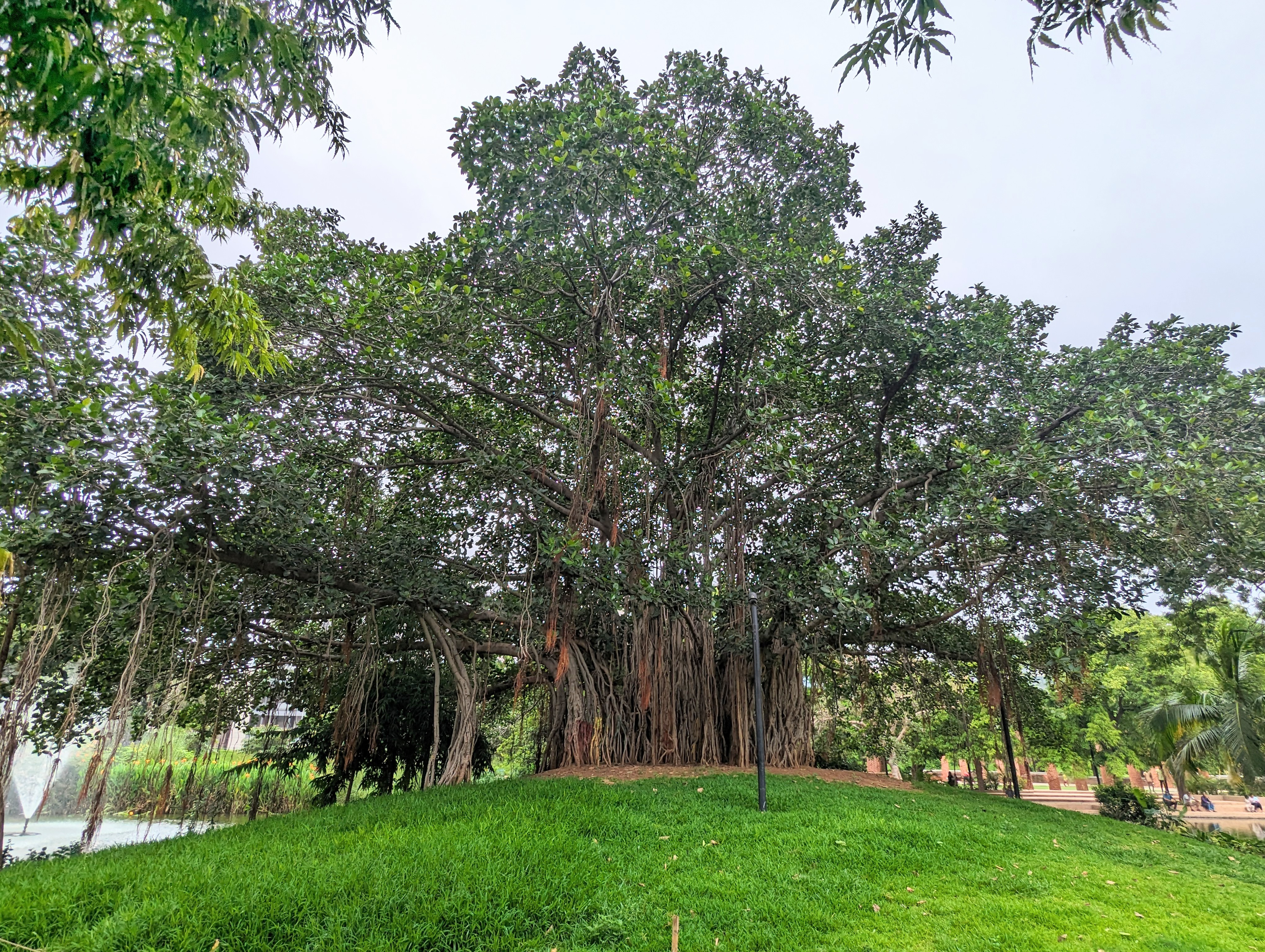
Old banyan tree in Parimal Garden

In the late 1950s, the first mayor of Ahmedabad Municipal Corporation (AMC), Chinubhai Chimanlal, presented a proposal to establish city parks. He secured funding and collaboration between the industrialist Jayantilal Bhikabhai, and K. M. Katawala, M. D. Rajpal, along with other members of the public.

The area around an old Banyan tree and a tank, as shown in the Town Planning Scheme of the 1940s, was selected as the site for the park. Low-lying, the land is frequently waterlogged, forming a pond. The many mango trees around the area gave the neighbourhood its name Ambawadi. (Note: Ambawadi literally mean 'mango tree plantation' in Gujarati language) The garden was established in 1960.

The garden was maintained by AMC until the maintenance and development of the garden was taken over by the Torrent Group in 1995. Architect Kamal Mangaldas prepared a new site plan in 1998. The structures were designed by Devendra Shah while the landscaping was done by Prem Bhojnagarwala and the garden folly was designed by Arjun Mangaldas. The redevelopment was completed in February 2000.

The restoration of the garden began in 2021, led by the UN Mehta (UNM) Foundation associated with the Torrent Group and with support from AMC. This project was a part of the UNM Foundation's Pratiti initiative. The plan was executed by architect Aniket Bhagwat at the cost of ₹12 crore (US$1.3 million).The garden was opened to the public on 9 August 2022 and inaugurated by Chief Minister of Gujarat Bhupendrabhai Patel.

== Architecture and features ==
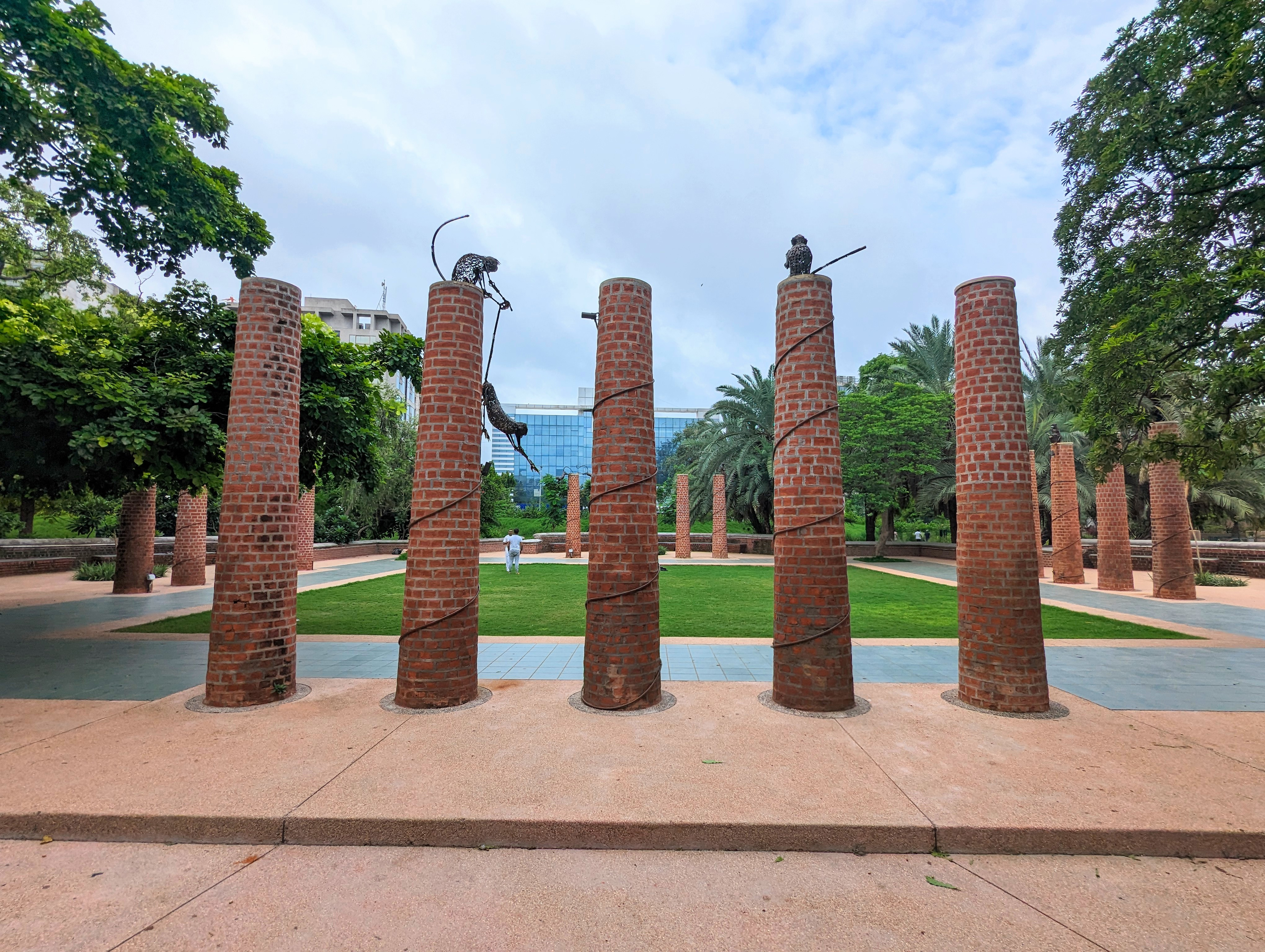
Brick chimneys represent the city's historical textile industry. The scrap metal monkeys are installed on these chimneys.

The garden has a central lotus pond with fish surrounded by a hundred terrazzo benches. It also has a walkway, a herbal garden, a sports zone, eight lawn plots, a pet park, and toilet facilities.

In the park's 8.5 acres (34,000 m^{2}) area, there is a yoga and meditation pavilion spread over 13,000 square feet (1,200 m^{2}) and a nature corner spread over 1,450 square feet (135 m^{2}). There is a two-storey gymnasium, with one floor reserved for women and the other reserved for men. The amphitheatre has a capacity of 250.

The brick chimneys in the garden represent the city's past era of textile industry. The art installation of monkeys made from scrap metal was implemented by Vadodara-based artist Premkumar Vaishya (David). In the 2021 restoration, the brick chimneys and bougainvillea arbour were retained and restored, while more than 600 trees of 45 species and 7,500 plants of 125 species were planted. Bamboo and palm trees were also planted. There is an old banyan tree in the garden. (Note: The age of the banyan tree is mentioned 400-year-old in Gujarat Samachar and 80-year-old in The Times of India.)

== Gallery ==
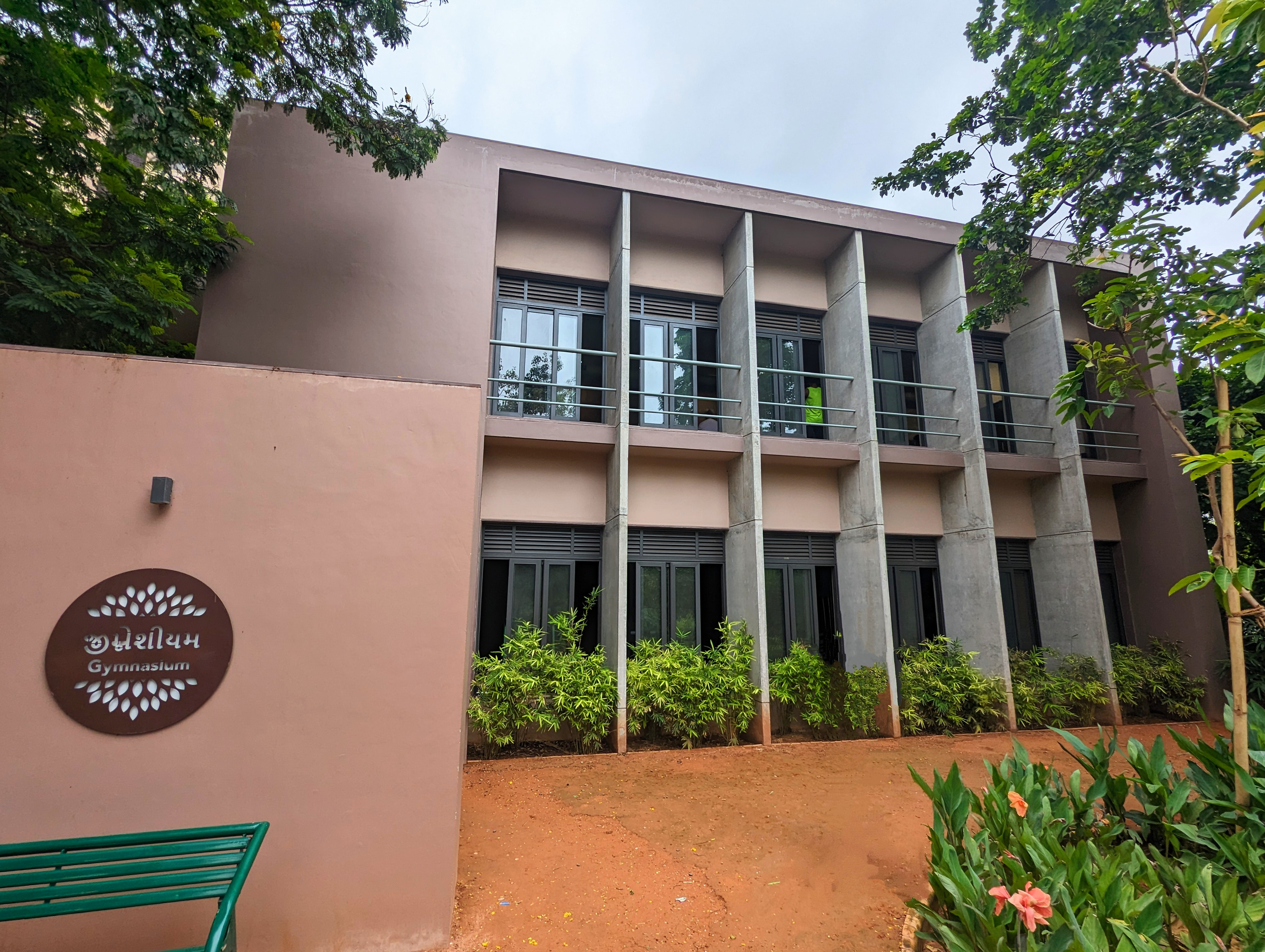
Gym

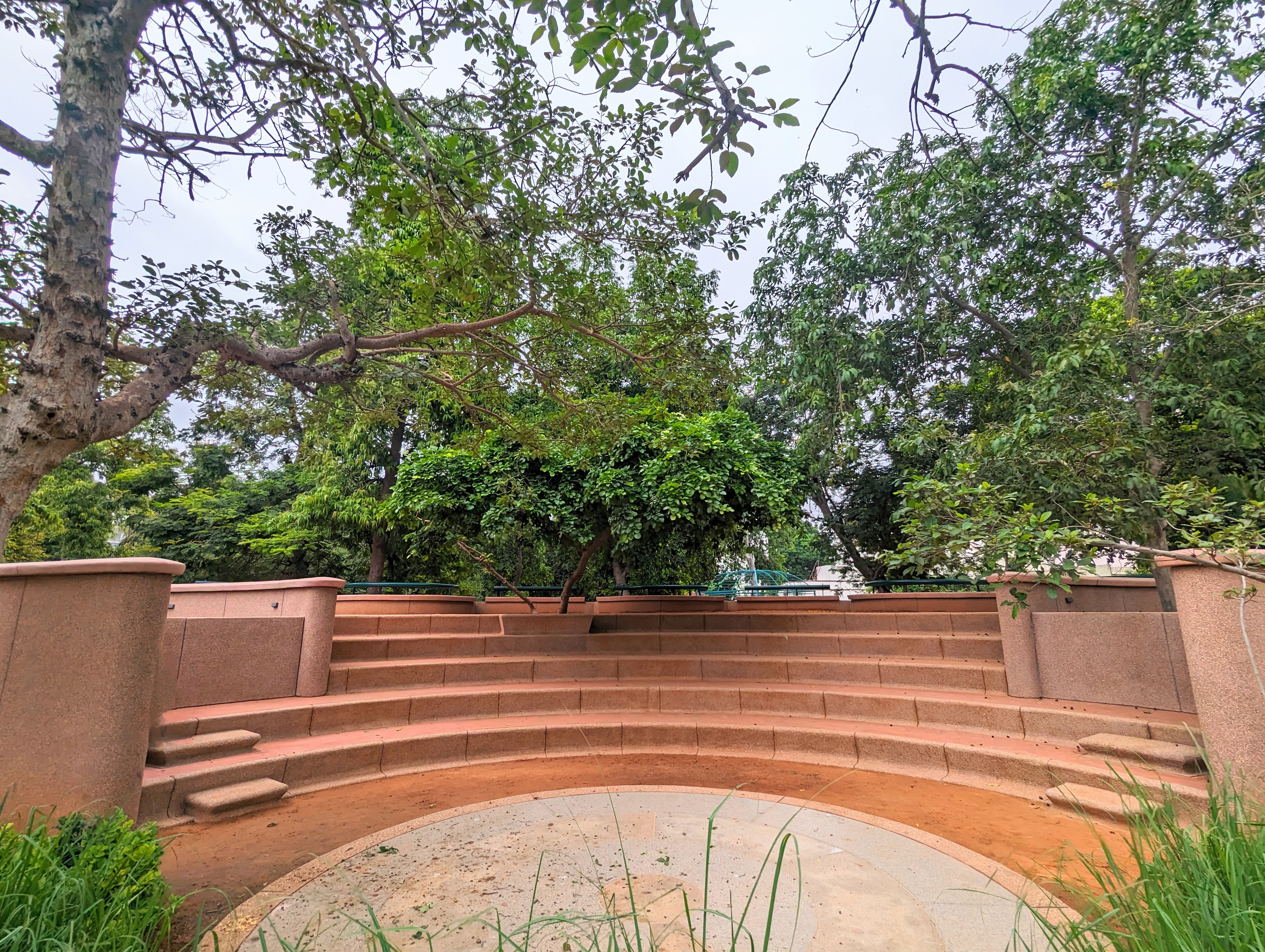
Amphitheatre

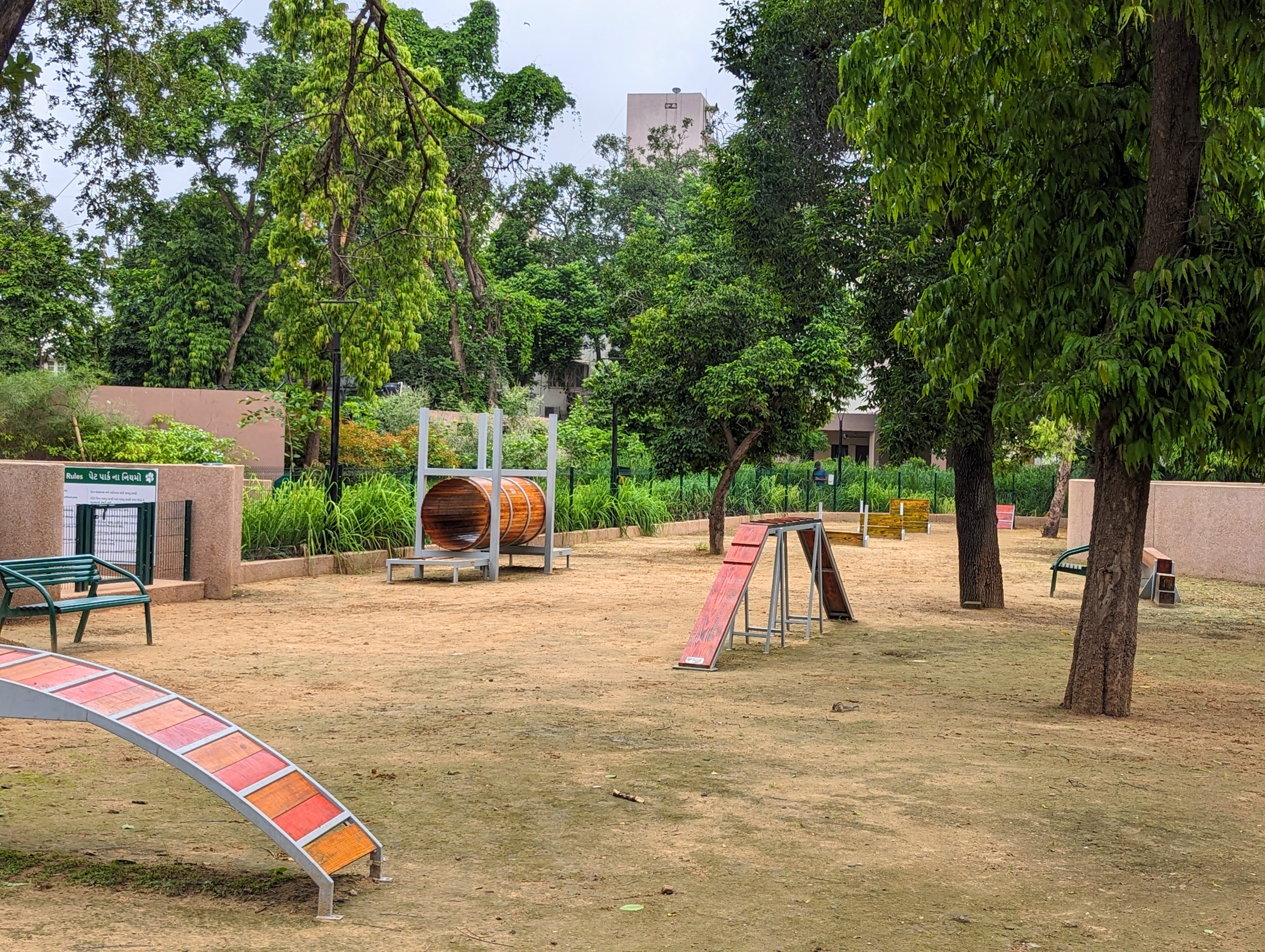
Pet park

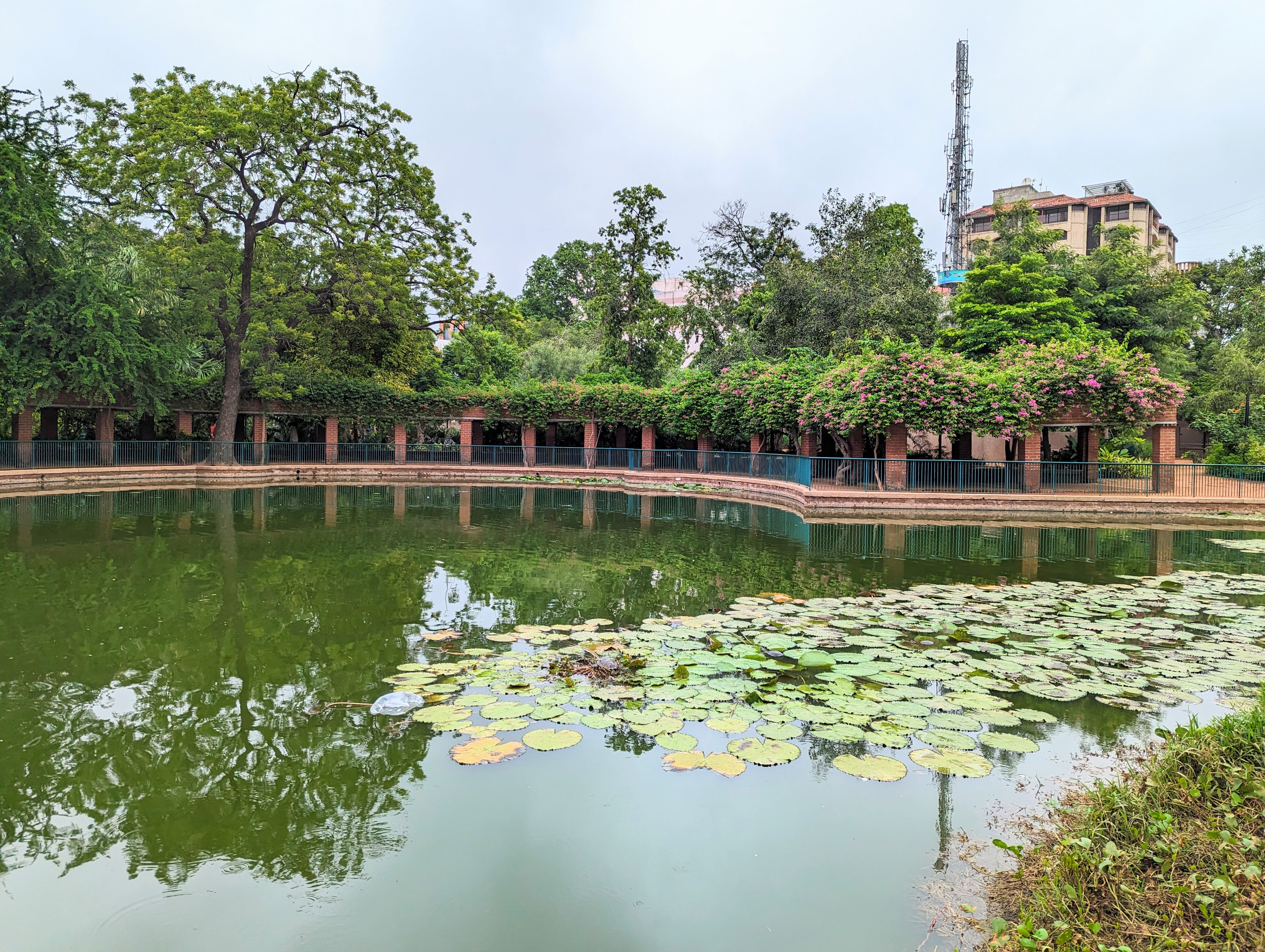
Arbour panorama

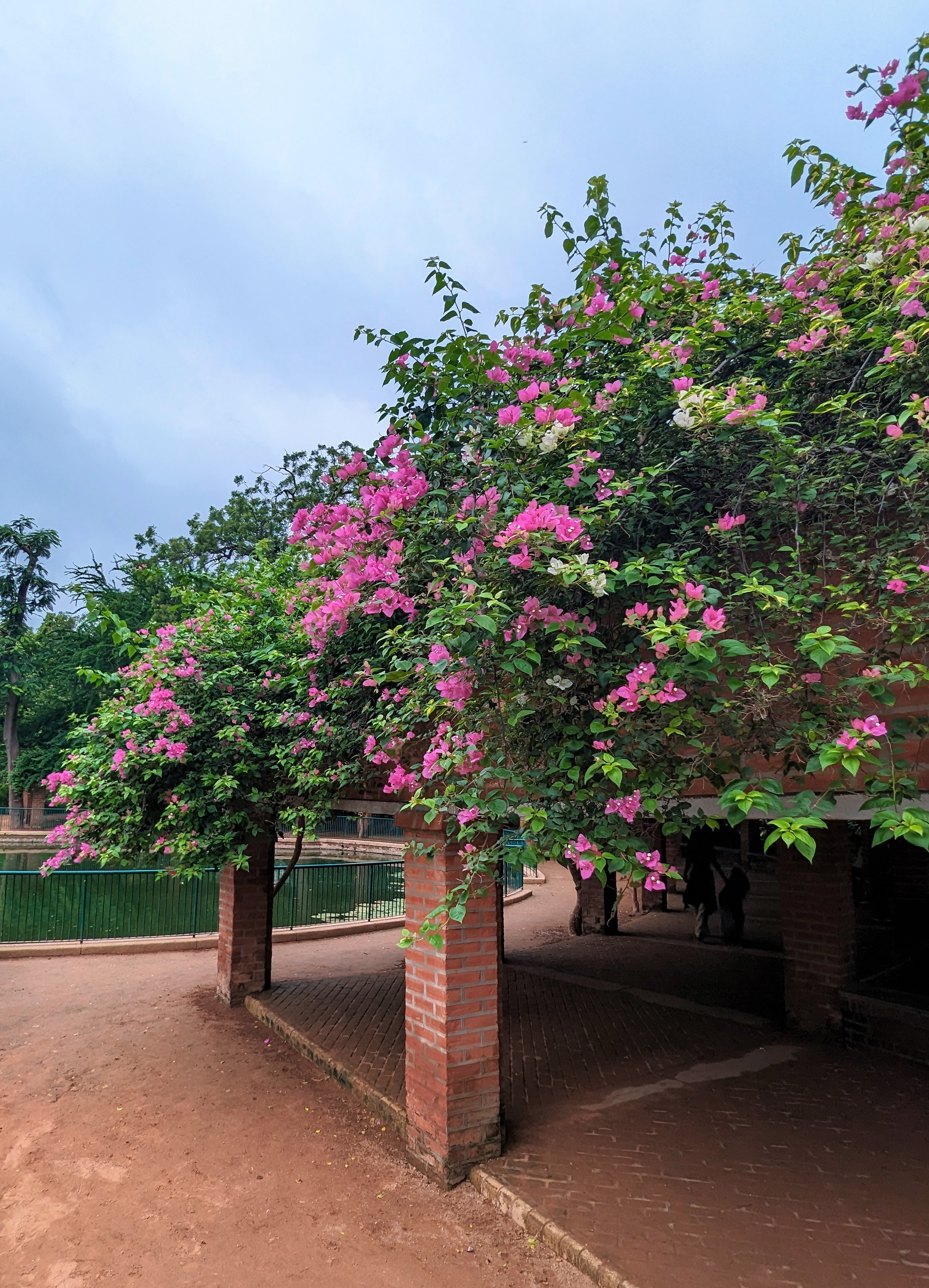
Bougainvillea on arbour

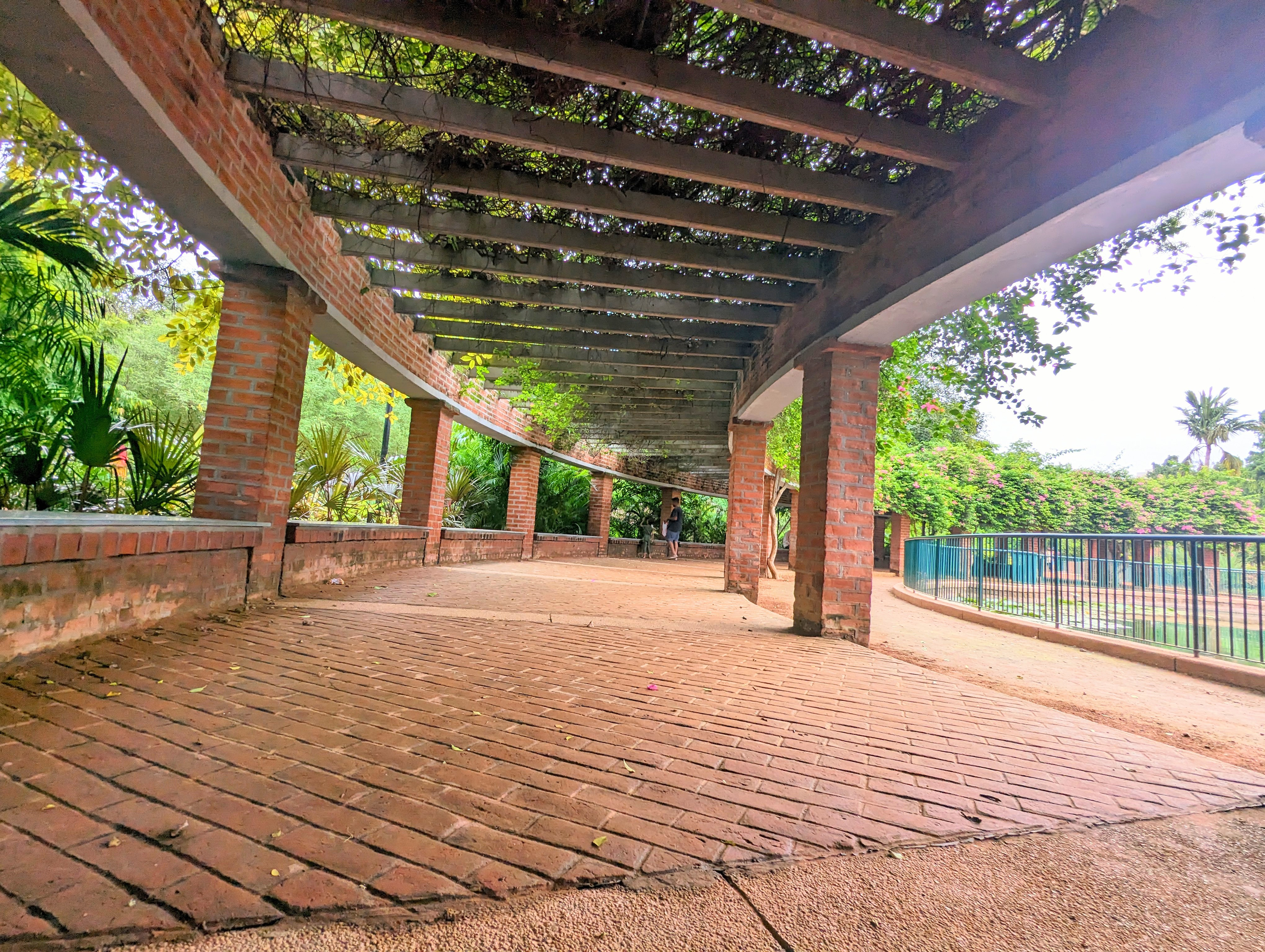
Arbour

== See also ==
- Lokmanya Tilak Garden
- Law Garden
- Ecology Park
