= Law Garden =

Public garden in Ahmedabad, India

- Sheth Motilal Hiralal Park
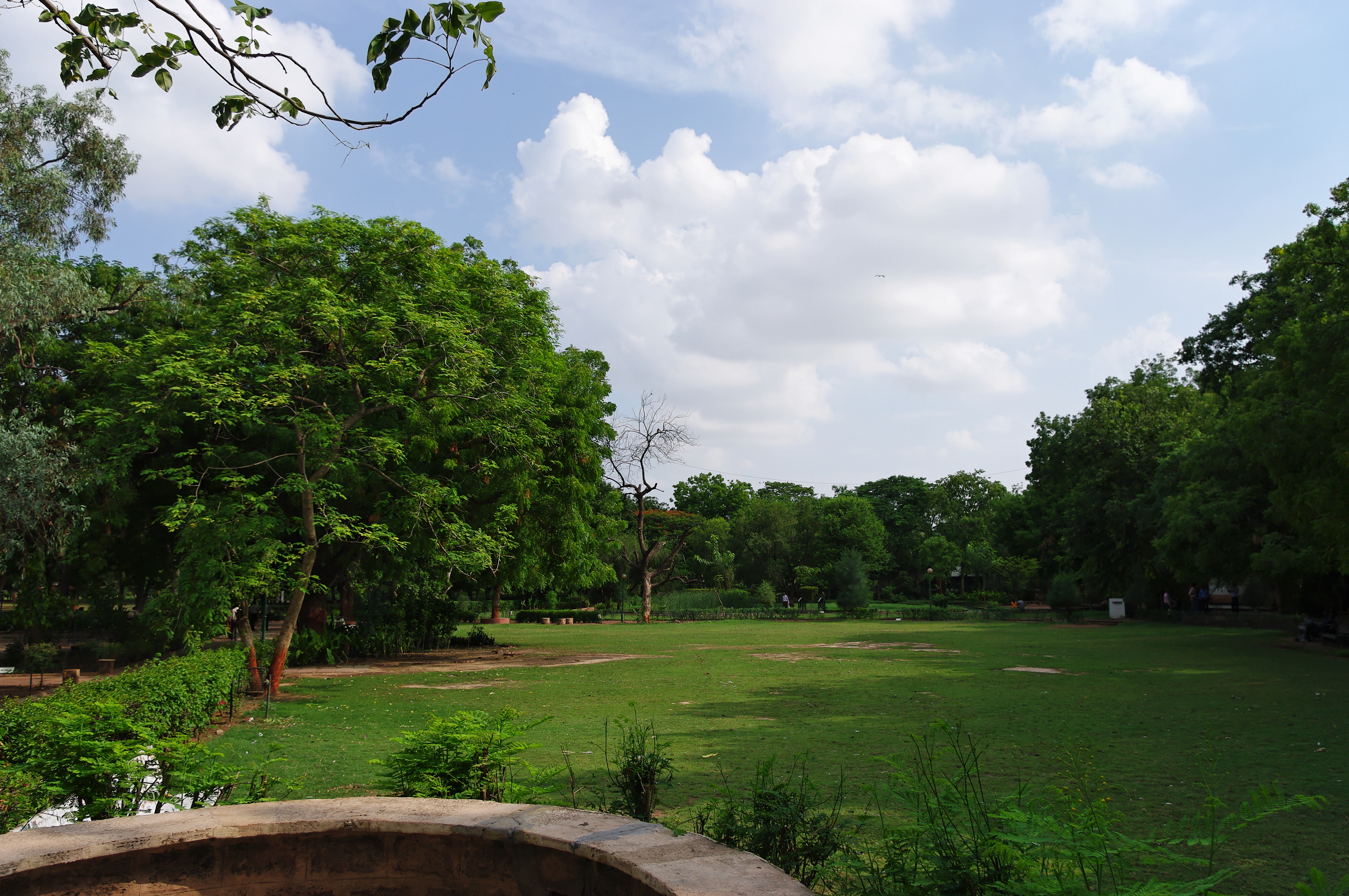
- Interactive map of Law Garden
- Type: Urban park
- Location: Ahmedabad, India
- Coordinates: 23.0264°N 72.5608°E
- Area: 10.16 acres (41,100 m^{2})
- Designer: Kamal Mangaldas
- Owner: Ahmedabad Municipal Corporation
- Operator: Ashima Group
- Open: All year
- Water: Pond
- Public transit: AMTS; BRTS Route 8

Law Garden, officially Sheth Motilal Hirabhai Park, is an urban park in Ahmedabad, Gujarat, India. It was redeveloped in 1997. There is a street market of handicraft goods, street food and other goods along the walls of the garden. The street market was revamped in 2020.

== Location ==
Law Garden is situated on Final Plot No. 430 of Ellisbridge Town Planning Scheme No. 3. The location was a vast triangular open space opposite Gujarat Law Society (GLS) in Navrangpura ward of West Zone of the city. It was later developed in a public park.

The garden gets its name from nearby Law College. It is surrounded by roads on all sides. On the north side, Municipal Commissioner's and Mayor's Bunglows are located while Law College and C. G. Road are on the west. British Library, Ellisbridge Gymkhana, Institute of Engineers of India and a state art gallery Ravishankar Raval Kala Bhavan are on south side.

== History ==
In 1995, the municipal commissioner of Ahmedabad Municipal Corporation proposed the redevelopment of the park under public-private partnership. The redevelopment was funded and carried out by Saumya Constructions, a construction company of Ashima Group. The agreement was signed in October 1995. Kamal Mangaldas served as the architect of the project and the garden was handed over formally in September 1995. The project was completed in 1997 which cost about ₹80 lakh (equivalent to ₹4.1 crore or US$430,000 in 2023). The agreement was extended in October 2000 for five more years.

== Features ==
The garden is spread over an area of 10.16 acres (41,100 m^{2}). It has landscaping and lawns, large number group benches, children playing area, small pond, fountains and 855 metres (2,805 ft) long jogging track.

== Street market ==
The informal market outside and along the garden wall is popular local tourist attraction. In morning, the street food market catering morning walkers and joggers of the garden is setup. On sidewalks of the road, a handicraft market operates selling clothing, jewelry and artifacts throughout the day. In the evening, the road at the side of the garden is filled with street hawkers selling a variety of food items and other goods. This eatery market, locally known as Khau Gully, was revamped and opened to public in 2020 as Happy Street.

== Gallery ==
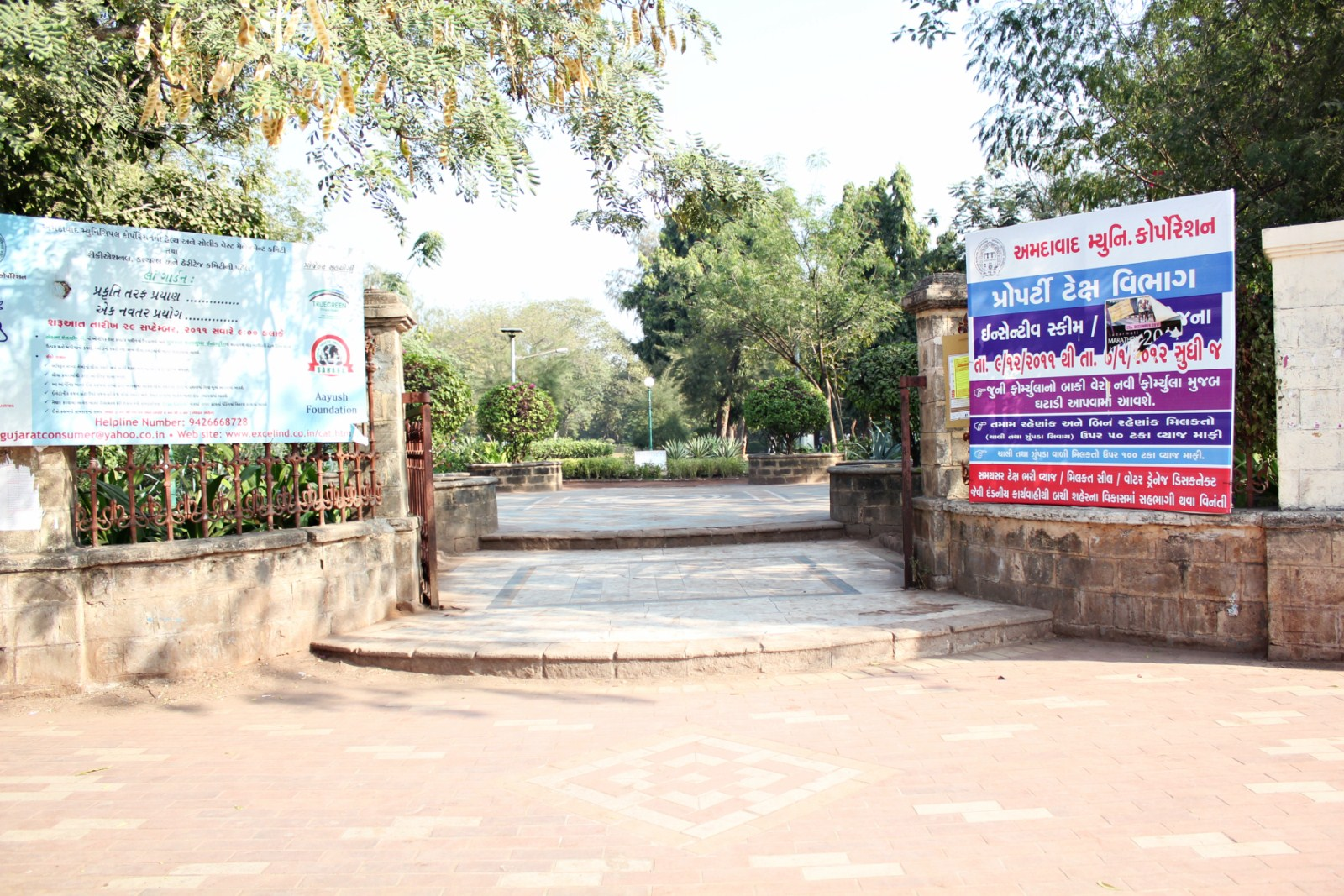
Entrance

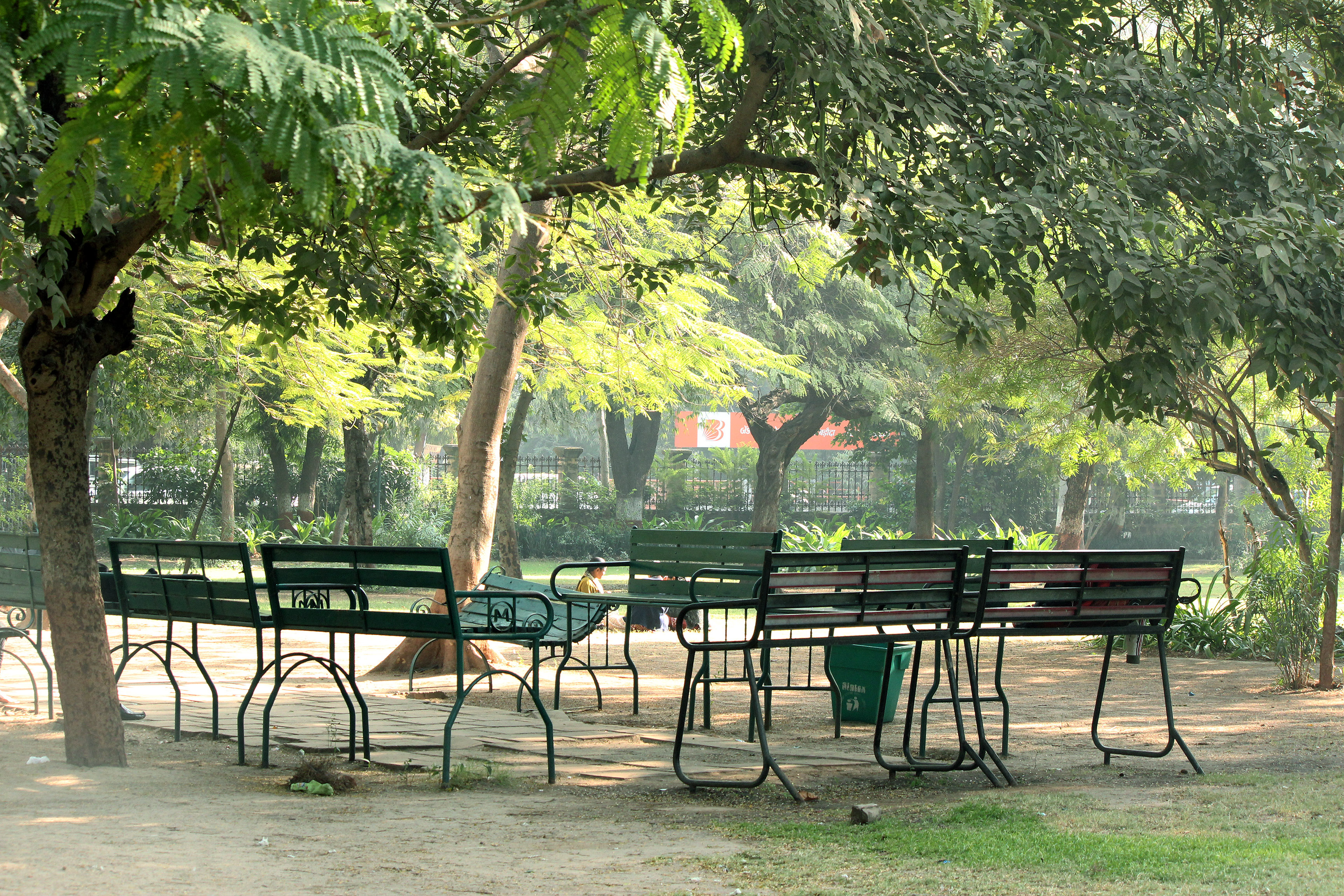
Group benches

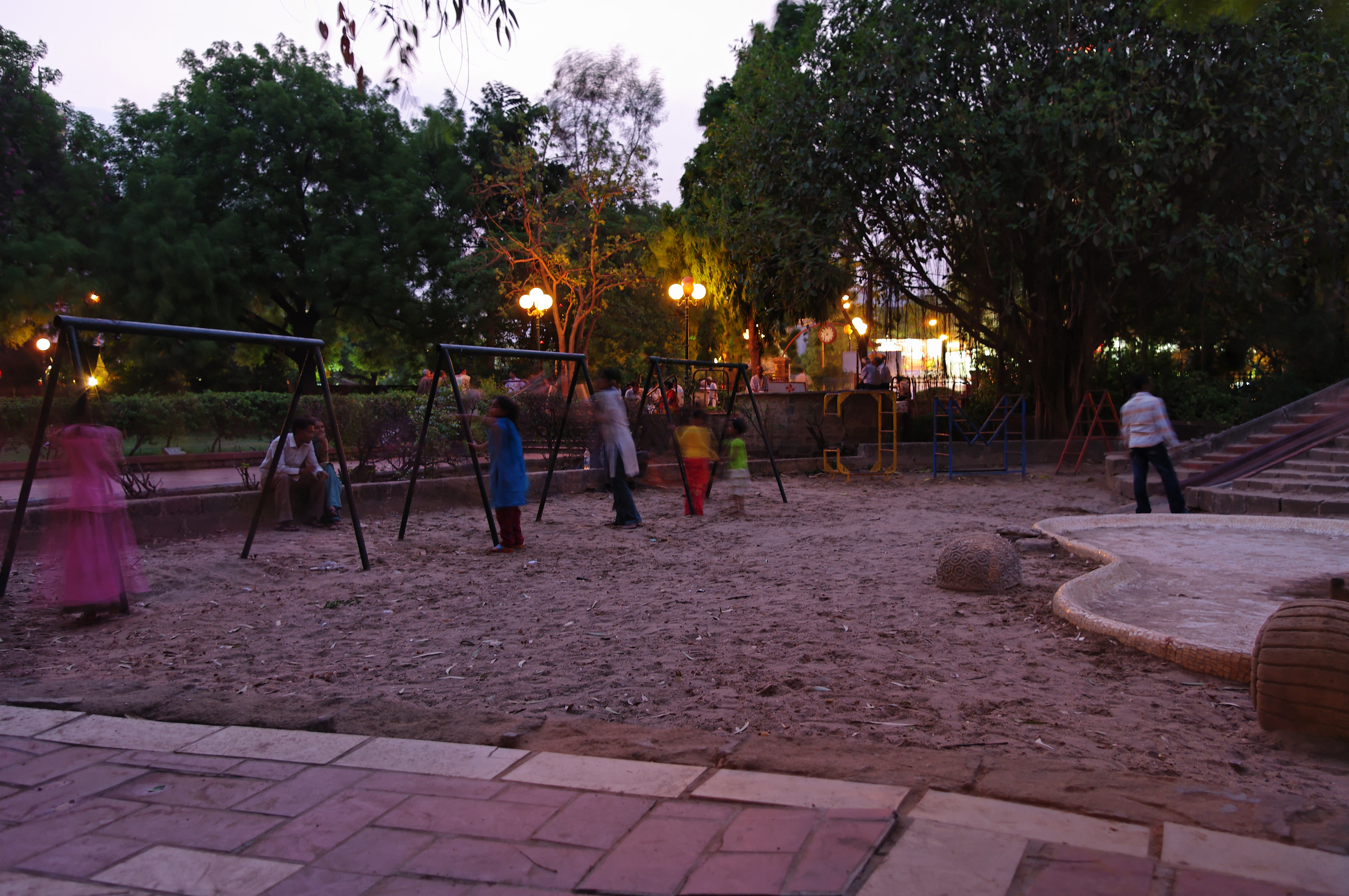
Children's play area

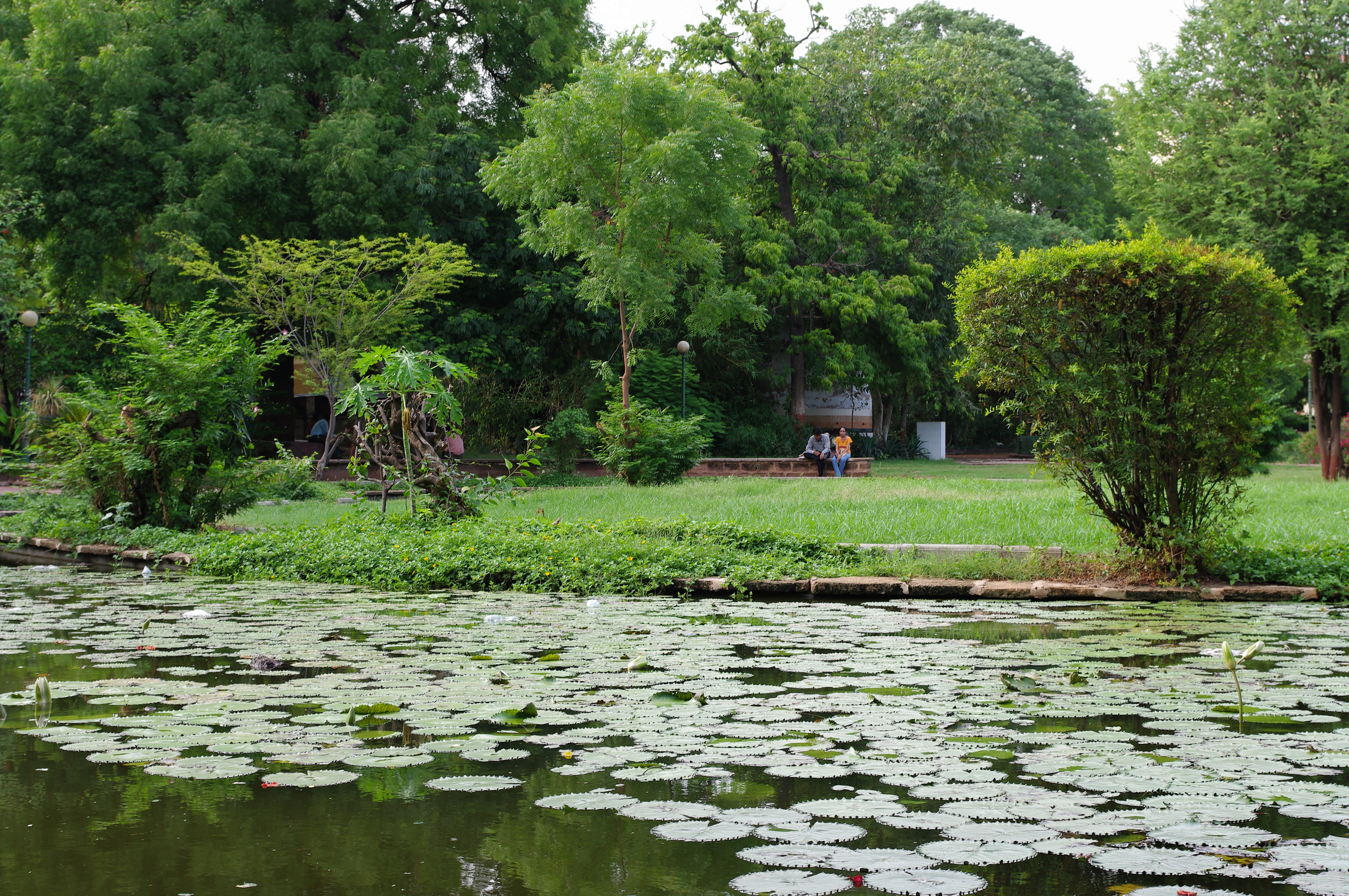
Lotus pond

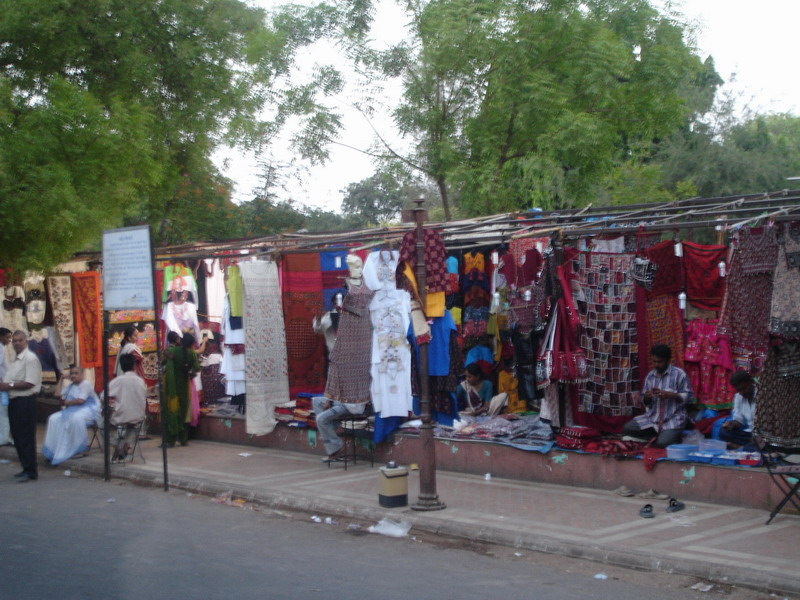
Handicraft market

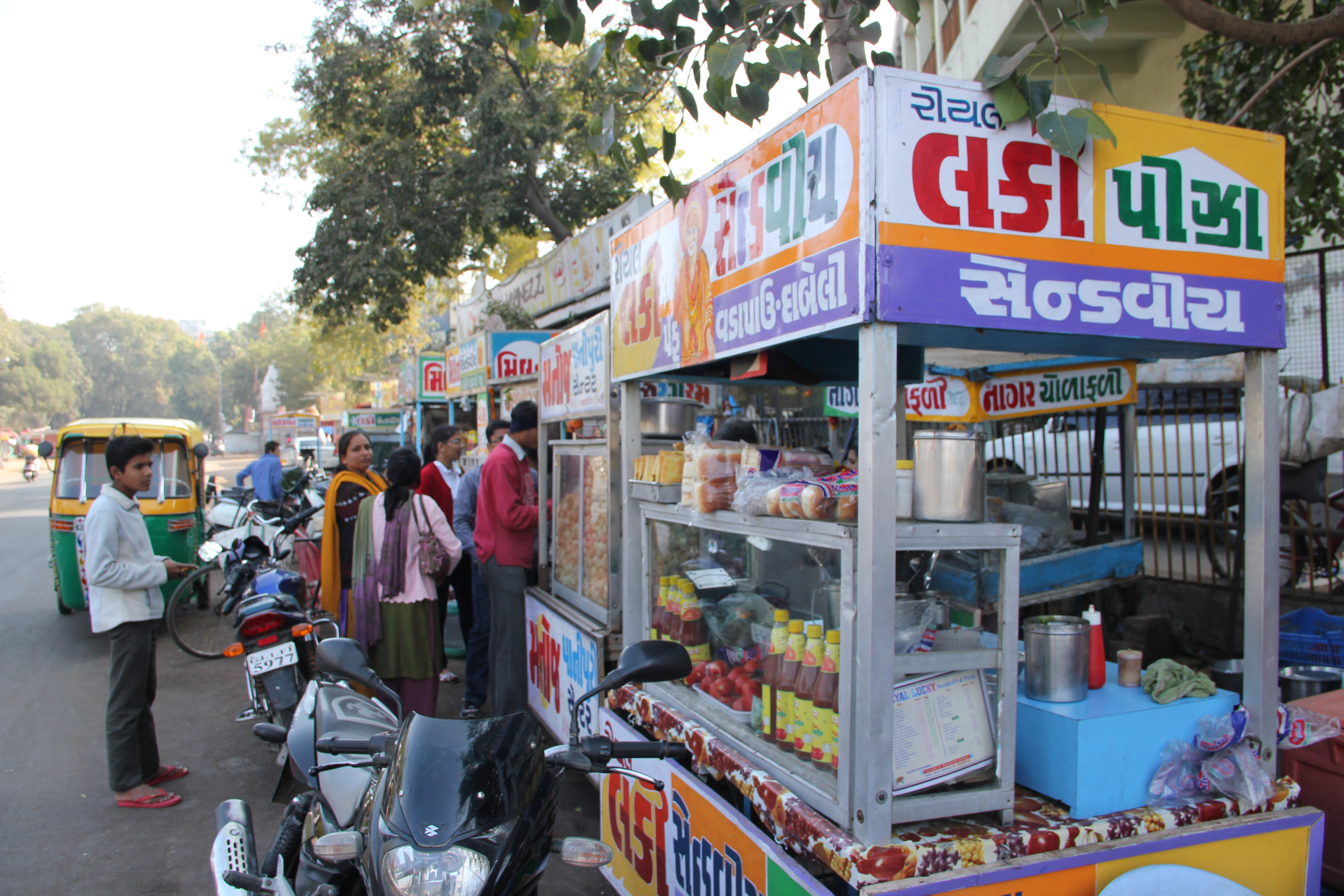
Street food market

== See also ==
- Lokmanya Tilak Garden
- Parimal Garden
- Ecology Park
