= Gujarat University =

University in Ahmedabad, Gujarat, India

- ગુજરાત યુનિવર્સિટી
- Seal of Gujarat University
- Motto: योग: कर्मसु कौशलम् (Sanskrit)
- Motto in English: Excellence in action is Yog
- Type: Public
- Established: 23 November 1949; 76 years ago
- Accreditation: NAAC
- Academic affiliations: UGC; AIU; ACU
- Chancellor: Governor of Gujarat
- Vice-Chancellor: Dr. Pruthul R. Desai
- Academic staff: 169
- Students: 3,747
- Postgraduates: 3,376
- Location: Navarangpura, Ahmedabad - 380009, Gujarat, India; 23°2′10″N 72°32′47″E
- Campus: 300 acres (120 ha); Urban
- Website: www.gujaratuniversity.org.in

The Gujarat University is a public state university located at Ahmedabad, Gujarat, India. The university is an affiliating university at the under-graduate level and a teaching university at the post graduate level. It is accredited A+ by NAAC. It was established on 23 November 1949.

== History ==
Many leaders like Mahatma Gandhi, Sardar Patel, Anandshankar Dhruv, Ganesh Vasudev Mavalankar and Kasturbhai Lalbhai recommended formation of the university in the 1920s, and the university was established soon after the independence of India. Gujarat University was evolved out of Ahmedabad Education Society, a major educational organisation of Gujarat then.

Gujarat University was formed under the Gujarat University Act of the Government of Gujarat in 1949 as a teaching and affiliating university. It was established under the recommendation of a committee headed by Ganesh Vasudev Mavalankar for rearrangement of university education in Bombay State. Many universities were established later which resulted in decrease in jurisdiction of Gujarat University.

It is an affiliating university at the under-graduate level and a teaching one at the post-graduate level. Close to 300,000 students study at university in the courses, faculties and affiliated institutes. The university caters for external as well as enrolled students. Affiliates include 285 colleges, 35 approved institutions and 20 recognised institutions, as of 2014. Gujarat University Ranks 1st in Gujarat and 26th in India for the Category: "Public State Universities" under the prestigious Outlook-ICare India University Ranking 2019.

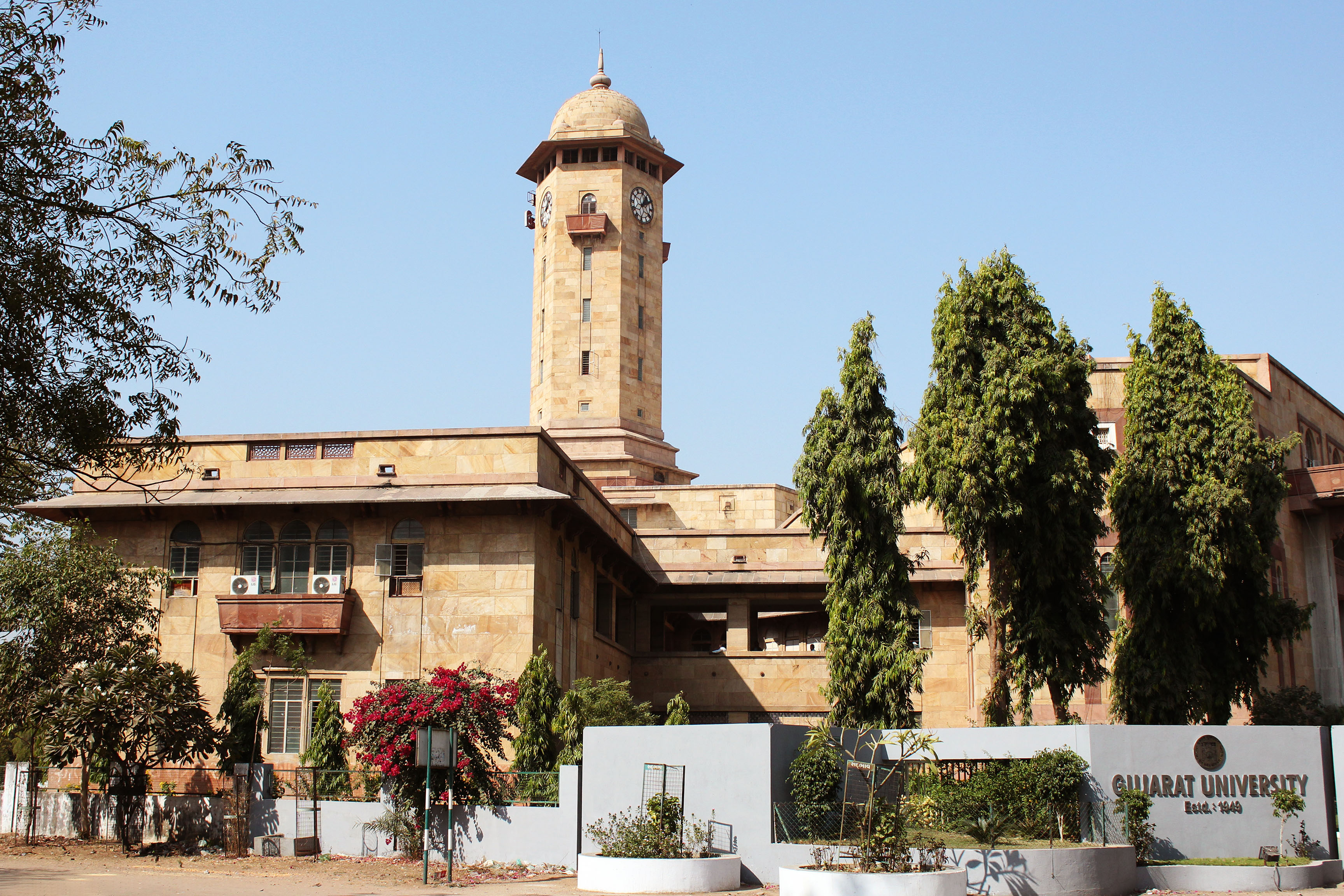
Gujarat University Tower Building

Organisation of the university is based on the Gujarat University Act, 1949.

In March 2023, Gujarat University was at the center of a controversy following a clash at one of its hostels during a religious observance that resulted in injuries to several students, including those from abroad.

== Campus ==
The campus of the university, located in the Navarangpura area of Ahmedabad, is spread over 300 acres (1.2 km^{2}). Affiliated colleges and institutes are spread across the Ahmedabad, Gandhinagar, Kheda district (excluding the limits of Vallabh Vidyanagar in Anand Taluka and the area with a radius of 5 miles (8.0 km) from the office of Sardar Patel University).

The main tower building of the university was designed by Atmaram Gajjar.

== Academics ==
=== Rankings ===
University rankings

General – India
- NIRF (Overall) (2024): 94
- NIRF (Universities) (2024): 76

- The National Institutional Ranking Framework (NIRF) ranked Gujarat University 60th overall in India and 44th among universities in 2020
- The National Institutional Ranking Framework (NIRF) ranked Gujarat University 62nd overall in India and 43rd among universities in 2021.
- The National Institutional Ranking Framework (NIRF) ranked Gujarat University 73rd overall in India and 58th among universities in 2022.
- The National Institutional Ranking Framework (NIRF) ranked Gujarat University 94th overall in India and 76th among universities in 2024.

=== Awards ===
Gujarat University has received the University Level National Service Scheme Award (2016–17) by President of India Ram Nath Kovind.

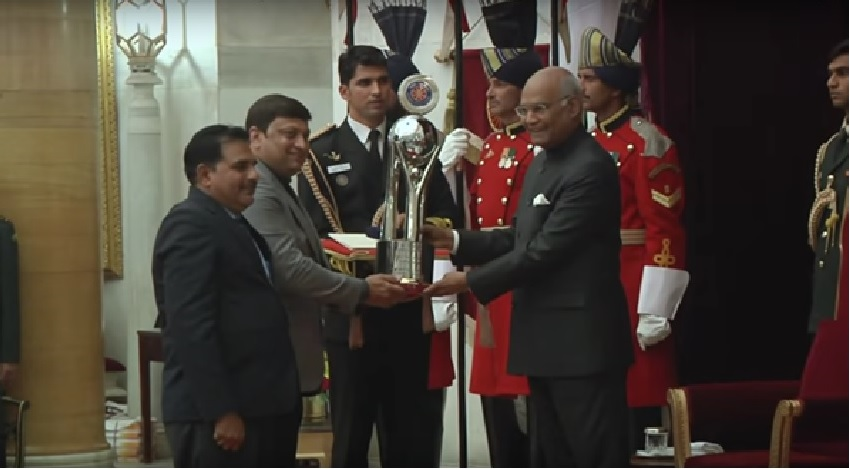
NSS Awards (2016–17)

== Student life ==
In March 2012, the university started a campus radio service named GURU on 90.8 MHz, which was first kind of it in the state of Gujarat and fifth in India.

== B.K. School of Business Management ==
The B. K. School of Business Management is a business school in the state of Gujarat. It is a postgraduate department of Gujarat University situated in Gujarat University Campus, Ahmedabad.

The school was started in 1976, to serve local students and those who could not afford the higher fees at other schools. The school offers two-year full-time and three-year part-time MBA programs for working executives. It is approved by the All India Council for Technical Education and part of B+ National Assessment and Accreditation Council accreditation. The school receives a grant from the University Grants Commission (UGC), and runs an Industry Institute Partnership cell under the UGC umbrella.

The school started a port management program to cater needs of expanding international business and privatisation of ports in Gujarat.

The school offers two year full-time MBA program and three year MBA part-time program (i.e. evening program for working executives) and offers specialization in finance, marketing and human resources. The school also offer post graduate diploma program in port management and diplomas in finance, human resources, and marketing and advertisement. The school updates courses in response to the demands of industry and offers placement assistance for graduating students.

== Notable alumni and faculties ==
- Amit Shah, Union Minister of Home Affairs
- Gautam Adani, founder of Adani Group (dropped out)
- Pranav Mistry, Computer Scientist
- Pankaj Patel, chairman of Zydus
- Krishnaswamy Kasturirangan, Space Scientist for ISRO
- Hasmukh Adhia, IAS (Retd.), former Revenue Secretary and Finance Secretary of India.
- Kumarpal Desai, Author
- Komal Shah, Indian-born American art collector
- Michael Dabhi, Indian Politician

== See also ==
- Hemchandracharya North Gujarat University
- List of educational institutions of Gujarat
