= Radio towers (Japan) =

Towers with radio receivers and speakers installed in public spaces

Radio towers are short towers designed to house radio receivers and speakers, they were installed between 1930 and around 1943, in parks and other public spaces across Japan by the Japanese national broadcaster, Nihon Hōsō Kyōkai (NHK), in order to allow the public to listen to radio broadcasts. They were initially aimed at popularising radio listening but later became an element in the home-front mobilisation that took place in the lead up to the Pacific War (1942–1945). Radio towers were also installed in areas colonised or occupied by Japan.

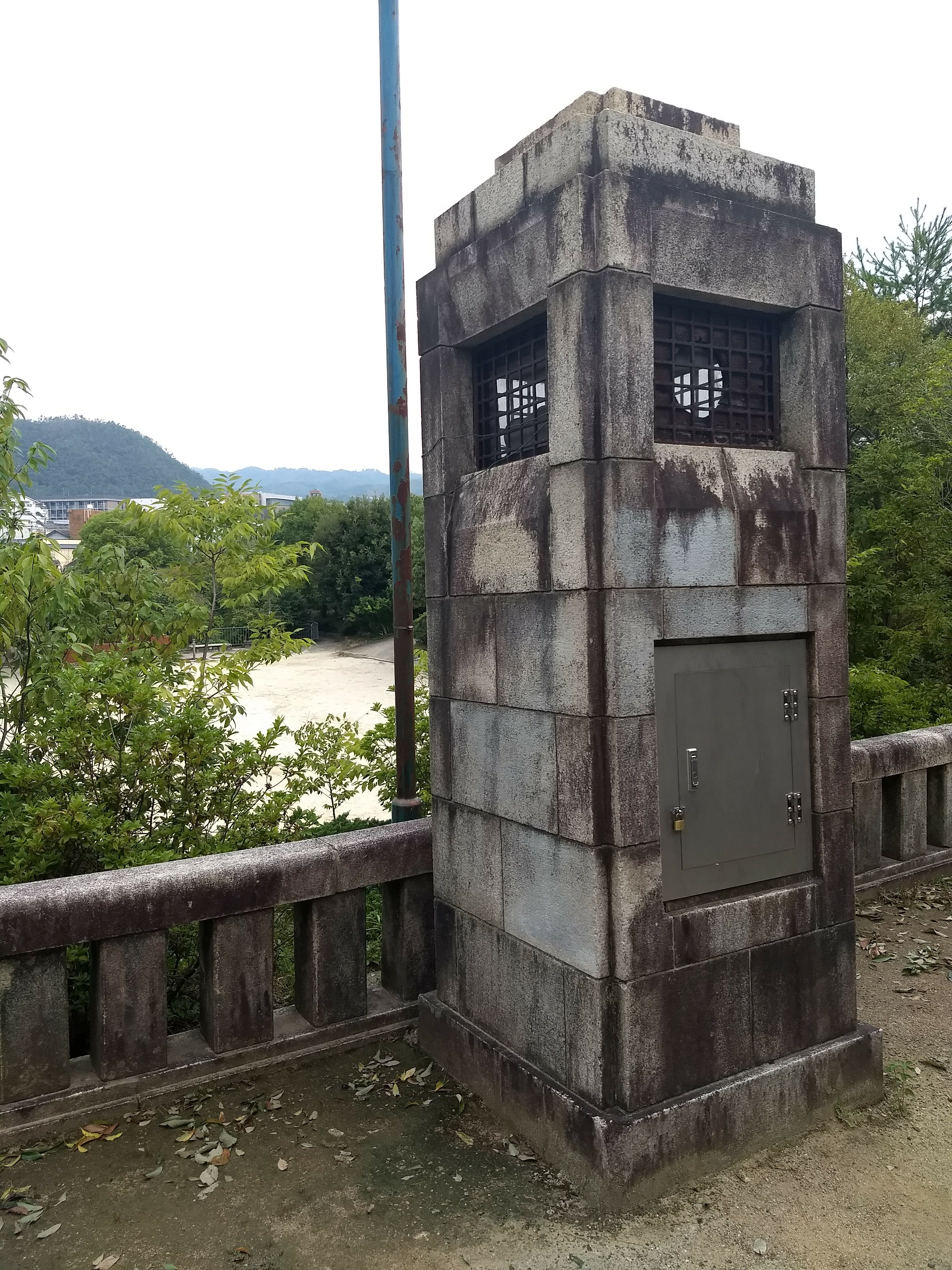
Radio Tower, Funaokayama Park, Kyoto

They were usually constructed of reinforced concrete, wood, or stone and most were in the region of 3–5 metres in height, and 1.5 metres in width and depth. Stylistically they tend to fall into two categories; the "traditional" designs are often reminiscent of Japanese stone lanterns, the "modern" designs tend to be more varied, reflecting contemporary architectural trends, often Art Deco. Mechanically, there was significant variation, some were little more than a weatherproof housing for a radio and speakers, other were more integrated and featured a button that could be pressed to engage power to listen for a certain number of minutes.

The first radio tower was opened by NHK’s Osaka Central Broadcasting Station on 15 June 1930 at the site of the old music hall in Tennōji Park in Osaka City, and was officially referred to as a "public-use listening facility".

Although the majority have not survived at least 35 are still extant, many of them around Kyoto and the Kansai region of western Japan.

== History ==
Systematic radio broadcasting had started in Japan in 1925, but over the first few years subscriber numbers failed to increase at the expected rate; the cost of a receiving license and that of maintaining a receiver inhibiting take-up. NHK Osaka was particularly active in implementing measures to increase the number of radio subscribers and curb cancellations. In addition to conducting door-to-door surveys of subscribers, it also organised workshops and set up a free consultation service to advise listeners on maintaining reception equipment. In addition, promotional films were produced and screened, and the programme was publicised using advertisements on public transport and newspapers. However, the most effective of these promotional activities was found to be radio broadcasting using temporary loudspeakers in urban parks.

In March 1930, Osaka City authorities accepted an application from NHK Osaka to establish a radio tower on the grounds that it would ‘spread radio knowledge to the general public’ and ‘demonstrate its mission to educate, entertain and inform the public’. The radio tower in Tennōji Park differed from previous outdoor radio facilities in that it was a permanent installation and listeners could listen to it whenever they wanted to. The Tennoji Park tower was well received, with live coverage of the National Junior High School Baseball Tournament at Kōshien Stadium (Osaka) particularly popular.

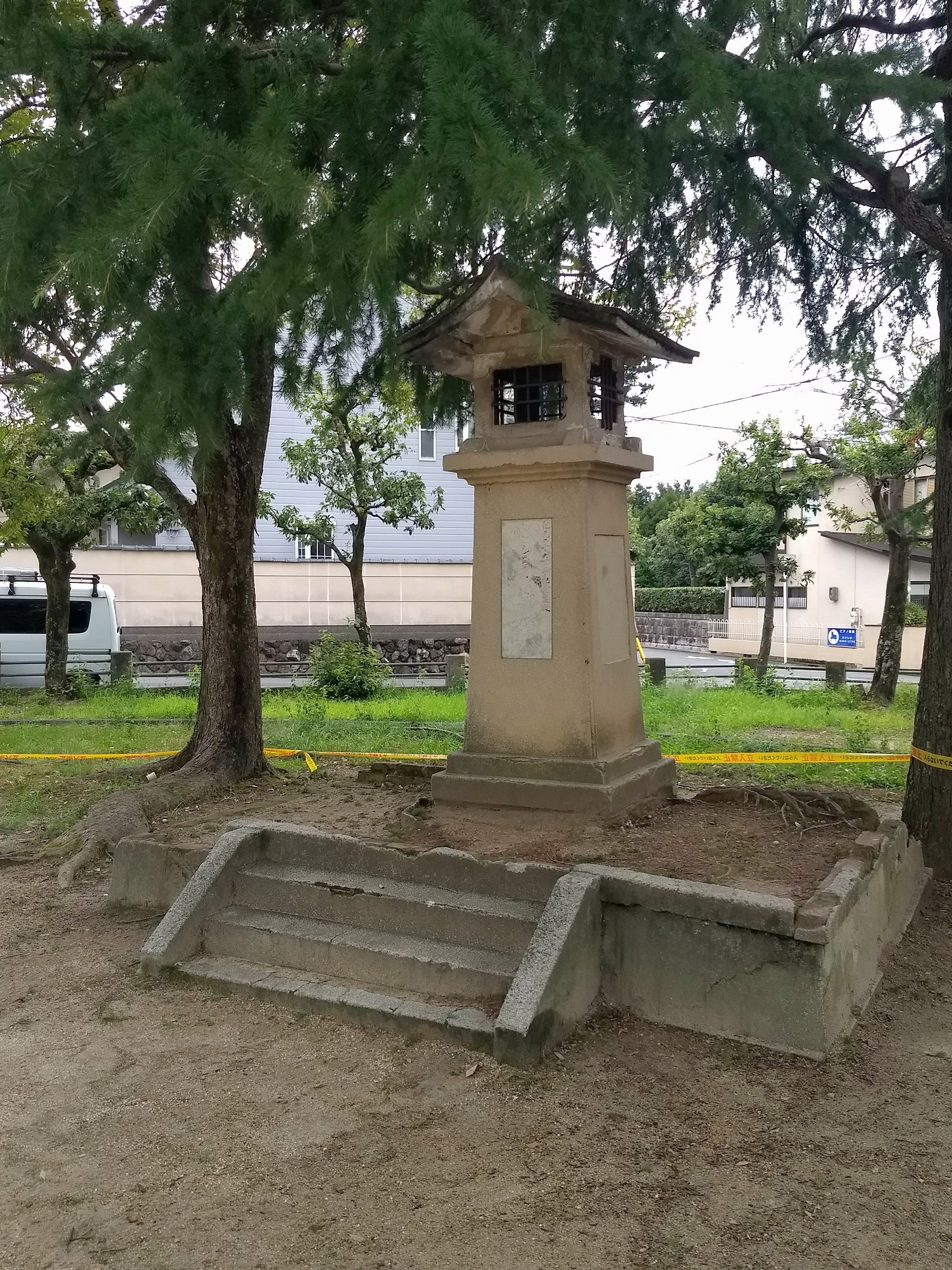
Komatsubara Park, Kyoto

In 1931, radio towers were installed in Nara Park (Nara City) and Minatogawa Park (Kobe), and in 1932 in Maruyama Park (Kyoto City), creating spaces where city residents could listen to the radio at any time. In the same year, the number of radio subscriptions exceeded one million, and as a commemorative project, radio towers were planned for 50 locations across the country.

By 1936 this goal had been achieved and there were 50 radio towers dotted around Japan. A few more were added in the years after the events at the Marco Polo Bridge in July 1937, which started the Second Sino-Japanese War, as government began to see radio as an important medium for direct communication with the populace. The construction of radio towers was promoted together with the ‘One household, one receiver’ (Ikko, ichi jushinki) campaign.

The ‘Kigen 2600’ anniversary events of 1940 also drove the installation of radio towers, which had become a focus for morning ‘radio callisthenics’. Mass, synchronised participation — made possible by radio — in the various commemorative and celebratory events planned across 1940 came to be symbolic of national unity and strength under the Imperial system.

By 1943, radio towers had been installed in more than 450 locations, including parks, temples, shrines and schools across the country, some funded by NHK donations, others by local volunteers. In parallel with the installation of radio towers, NHK also installed radio listening facilities in some of the main stations of the Ministry of Railways. The radio towers installed by NHK were widely used for early morning radio exercises and sports broadcasts.

With the spread of radio receivers in households, radio towers gradually fell into disuse, during the latter stages of the Pacific War the contents of radio towers may have been cannibalised for their metal content. Many were abandoned or removed. Some of those which remain are being preserved and utilised as cultural assets.

== Original Installation locations ==
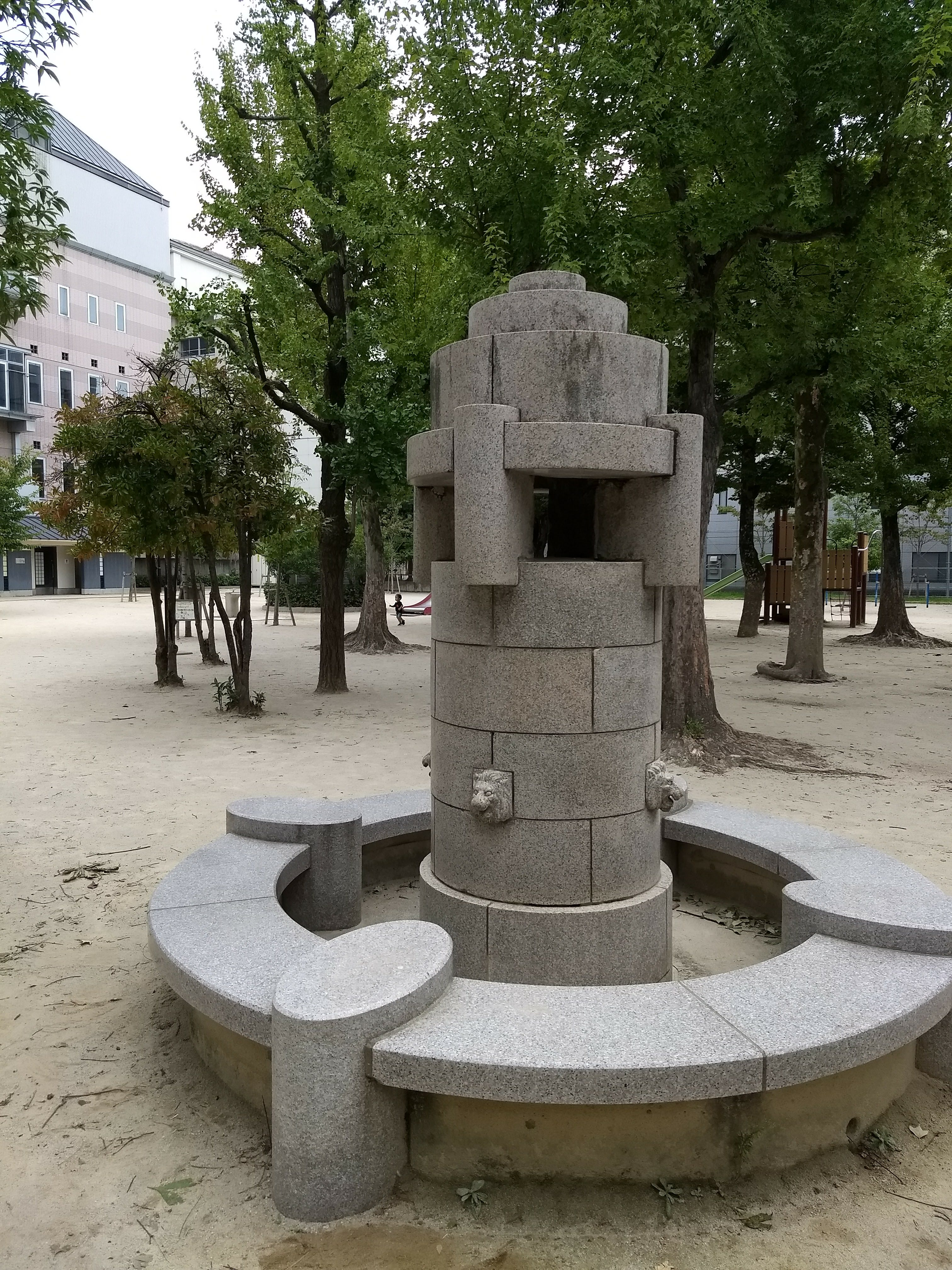
Radio Tower, Misayama Park, Kyoto

The NHK Radio Yearbooks (Rajio Nenkan), published between 1931 and 1943 contain expanding lists of radio towers as they were erected throughout Japan. Unfortunately, the lists are somewhat unreliable; extant radio towers have been found that are not listed while listed locations can be difficult to identify accurately due to place-name and boundary changes. Some installations may have been planned and not constructed, some have been moved postwar; the radio tower in Misayama Park in Kyoto was moved from the playground of a local primary school when it was merged with other nearby schools, and is now in a public park.

=== Overseas locations ===
In 1934, the first radio tower in Japanese-occupied Taiwan was built by the Taiwan Broadcasting Association in Taipei New Park Square. In 1939, radio towers, perhaps as many as 20, were also erected in Manchukuo. Plans were made to erect as many as 350 radio towers across occupied Malaya, Indonesia, the Philippines and Burma. Japanese Imperial Army documents from July 1943 record the existence of 131 radio towers installed across cities and town in Borneo and suggest that these were successful in attracting listeners, with up to 4500 people per day making use of the 41 installations in Manado. The US-Philippine Army, based on Corregidor Island, had continued to resist the Japanese Army and used short-wave radios to broadcast anti-Japanese programming to rest of the Philippines, confiscations and the erection of radio towers, in Manila's central market and other public places, was aimed at ensuring that listeners only had access to occupation-approved radio programming. Radio towers were also built on Hainan Island and in Sakhalin

== International equivalents ==
In the years leading up to World War II, similar public radio-listening facilities, known as Reich Lautsprechersäule or Deutsche Rundfunksäule were erected in Germany and occupied Poland, for instance in Wroclaw (Breslau) in the lead up to the Deutschen Turn- und Sportfest athletic festival in 1938, and Bad Godesberg. While similar in form and intention to Japan's radio towers they seem to have been a hybrid system combining public address and radio; in the Bad Godesberg installation, the radio receiver was placed in the office of a local official and the audio signal sent to it through cables, the official could also use a microphone to make announcements through the speakers.

In Italy after 1937, EIAR's Radio Rurale placed radios and loudspeakers in public places in an attempt to interest rural audiences in radio listening.

== Gallery ==
This gallery shows the known extant radio towers.

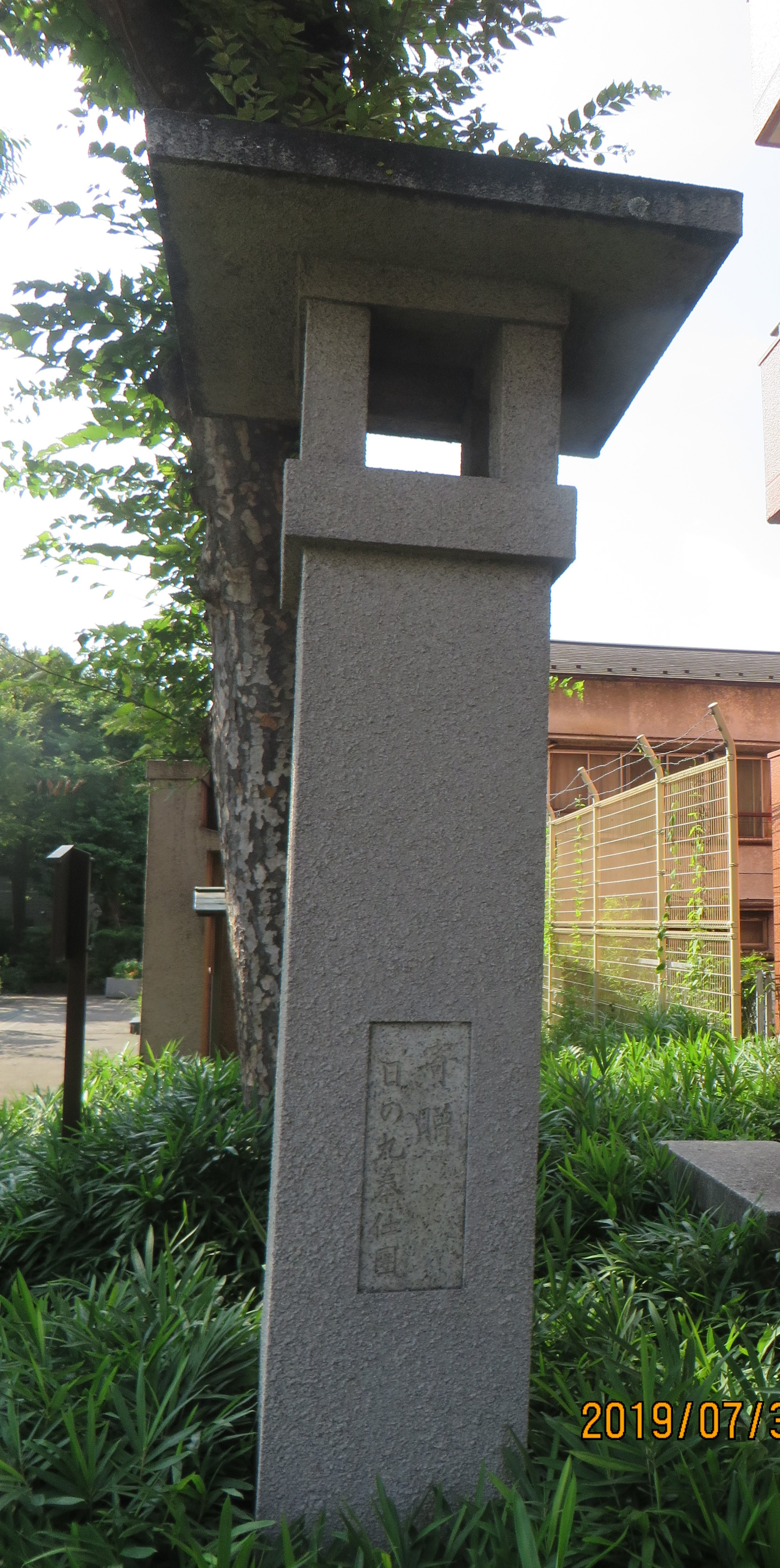
Seiseki Park, Shinagawa, Tokyo

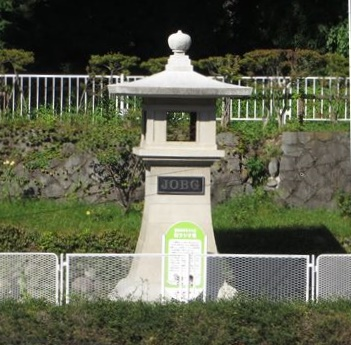
Luna Park, Maebashi City
Cultural Property No. 10-0247

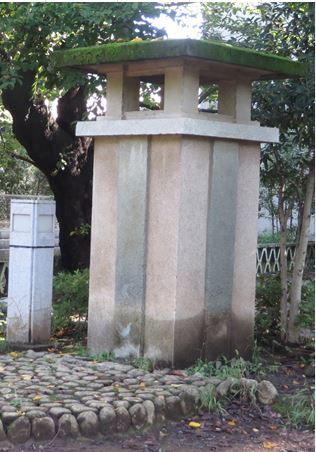
Tsukinomiya Park, Urawa, Saitama

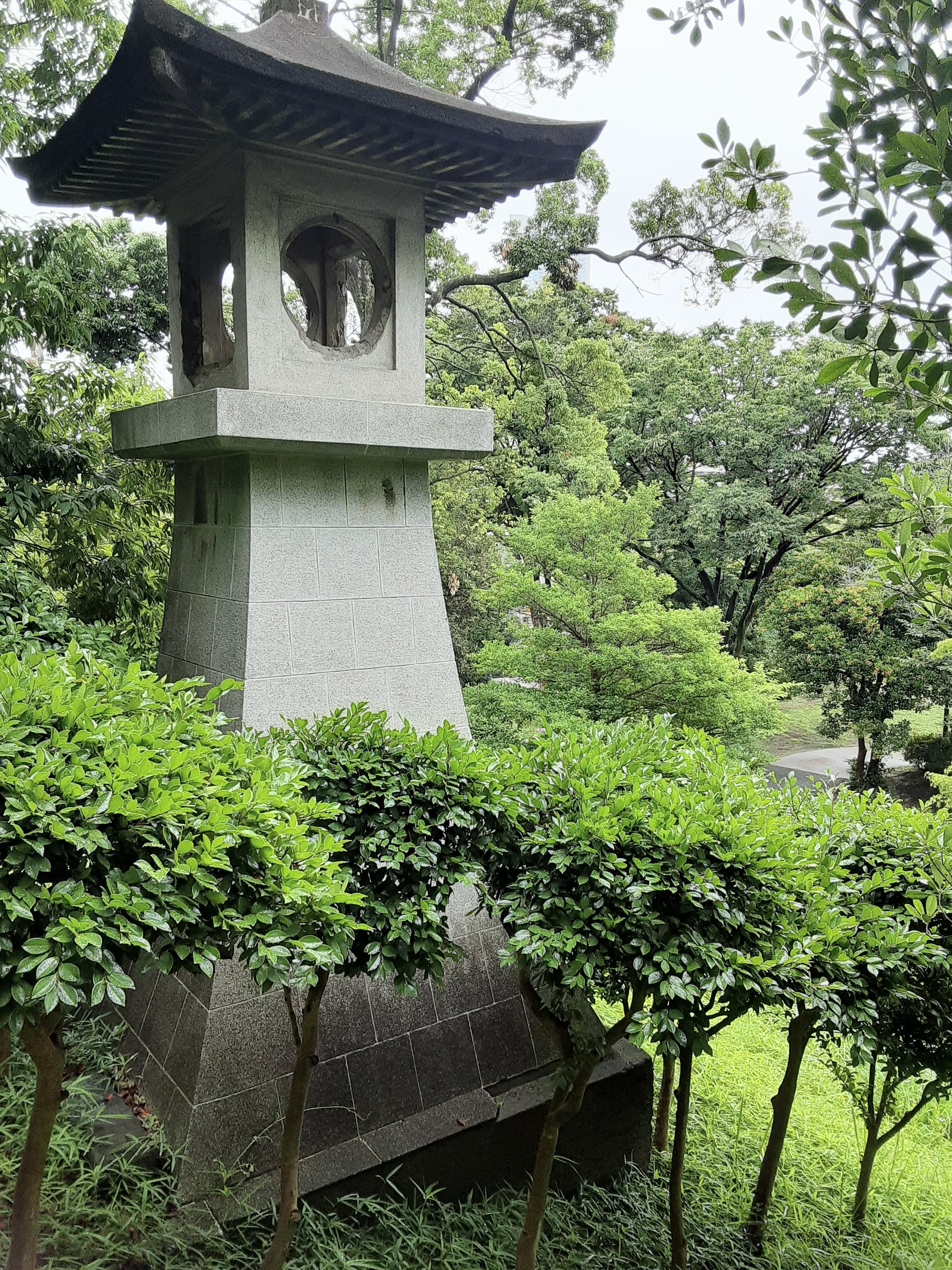
Nogeyama Park Radio Tower. Yokohama, Japan

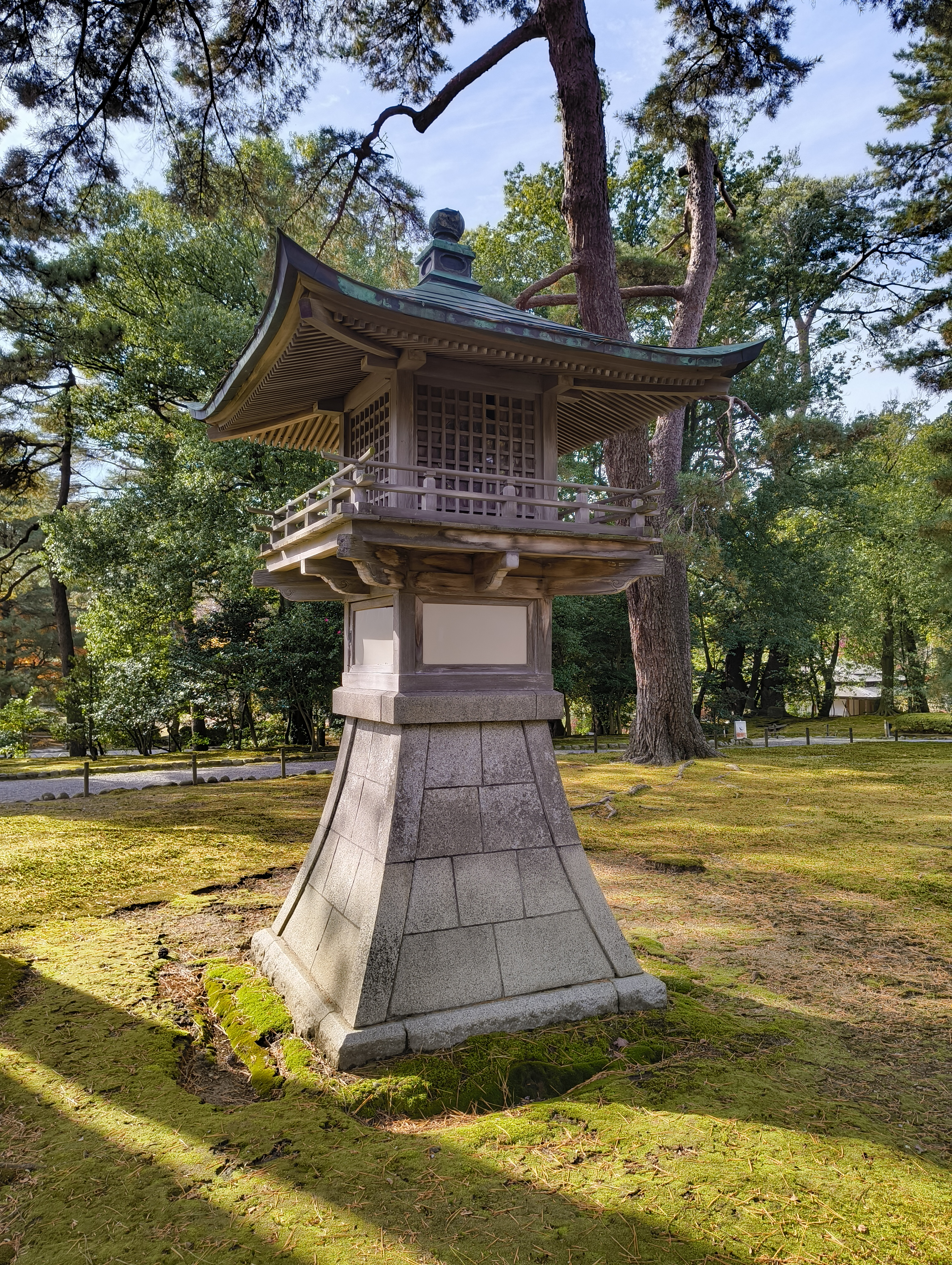
Radio Tower (1933) situated in Kenrokuen park, Kanazawa

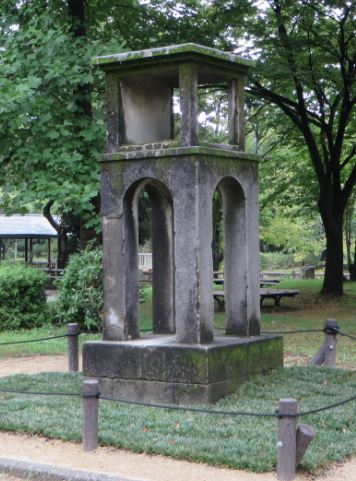
Shiga Park, Kita-ku, Nagoya

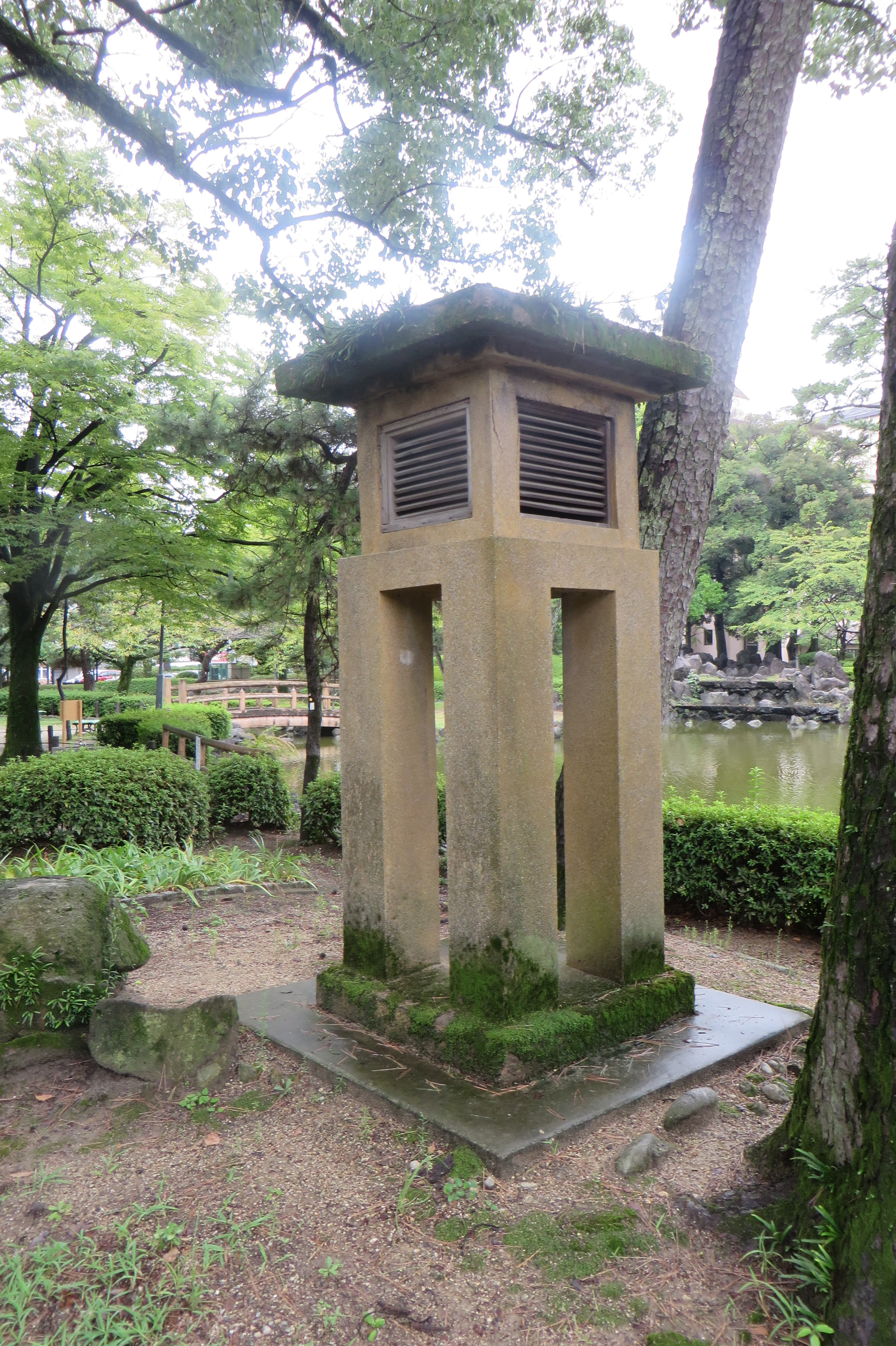
Nakamura Park, Nakamura-ku, Nagoya

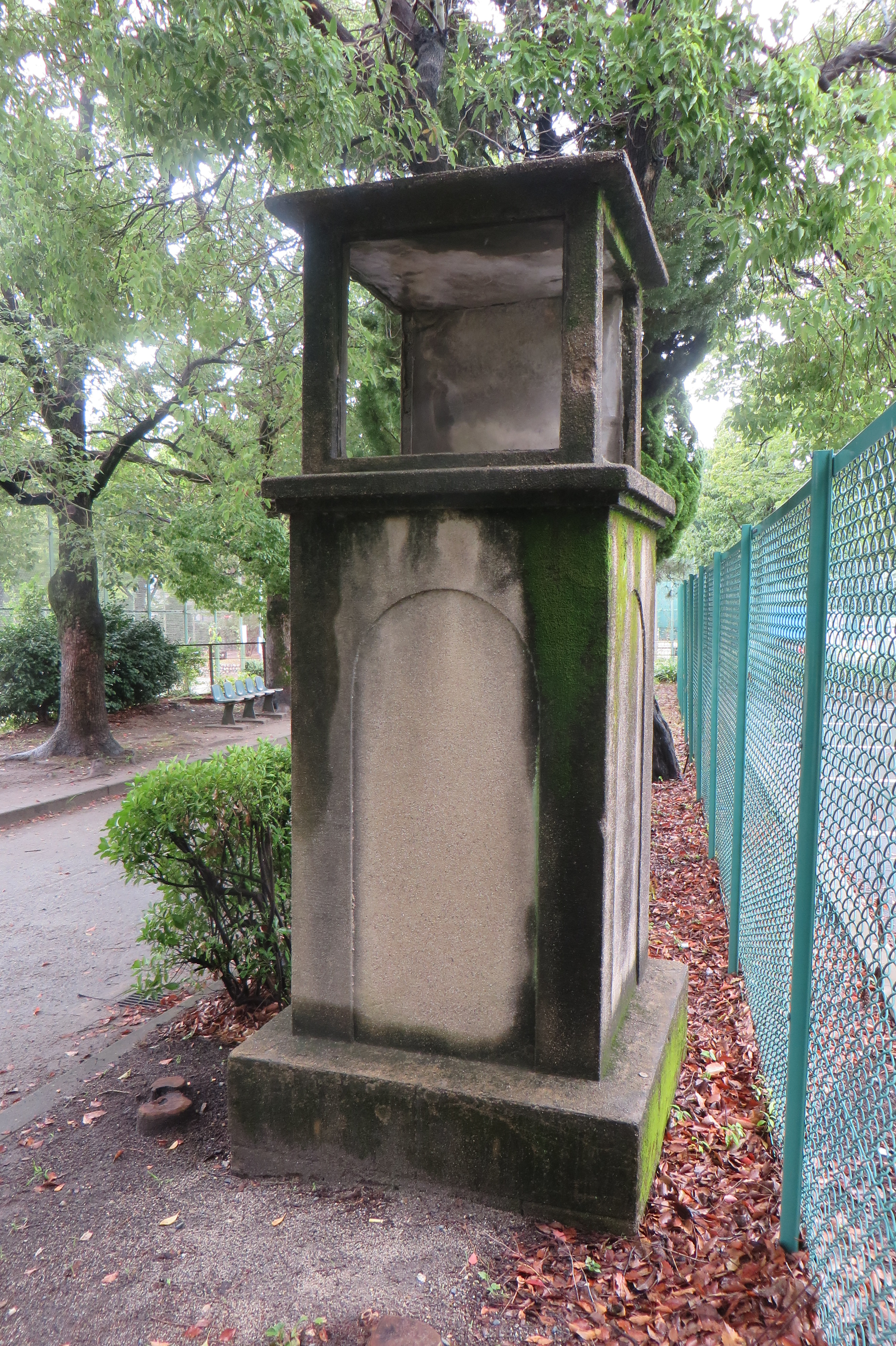
Matsuba Park, Nakagawa-ku, Nagoya

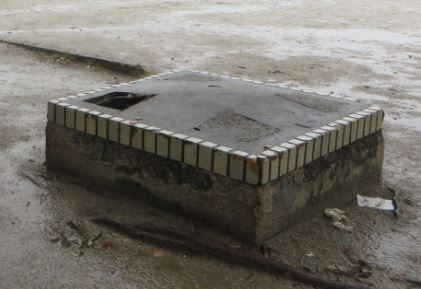
Dōtoku Park, Minami-ku, Nagoya (partial)

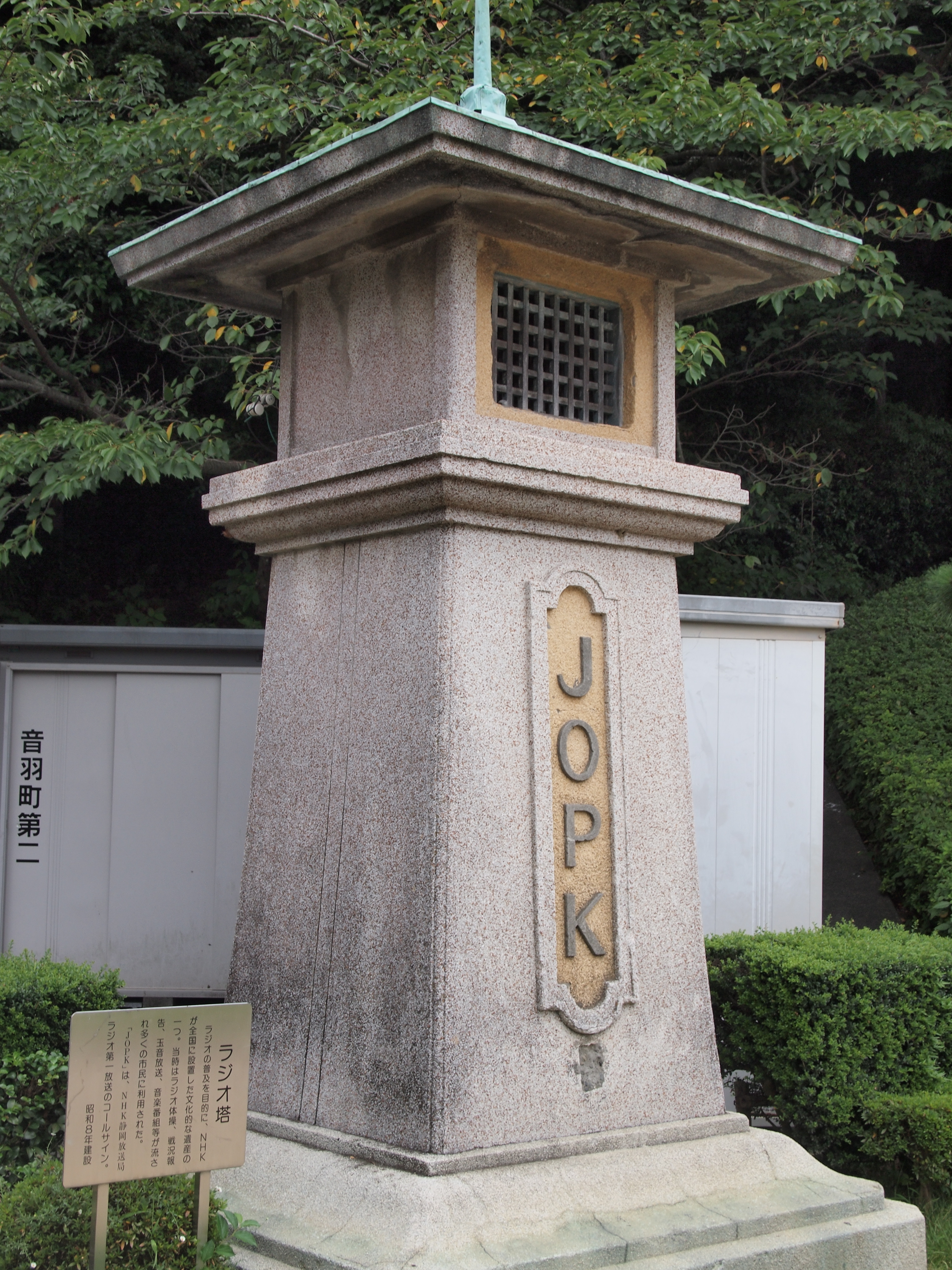
Kiyomizuyama Park, Shizuoka City

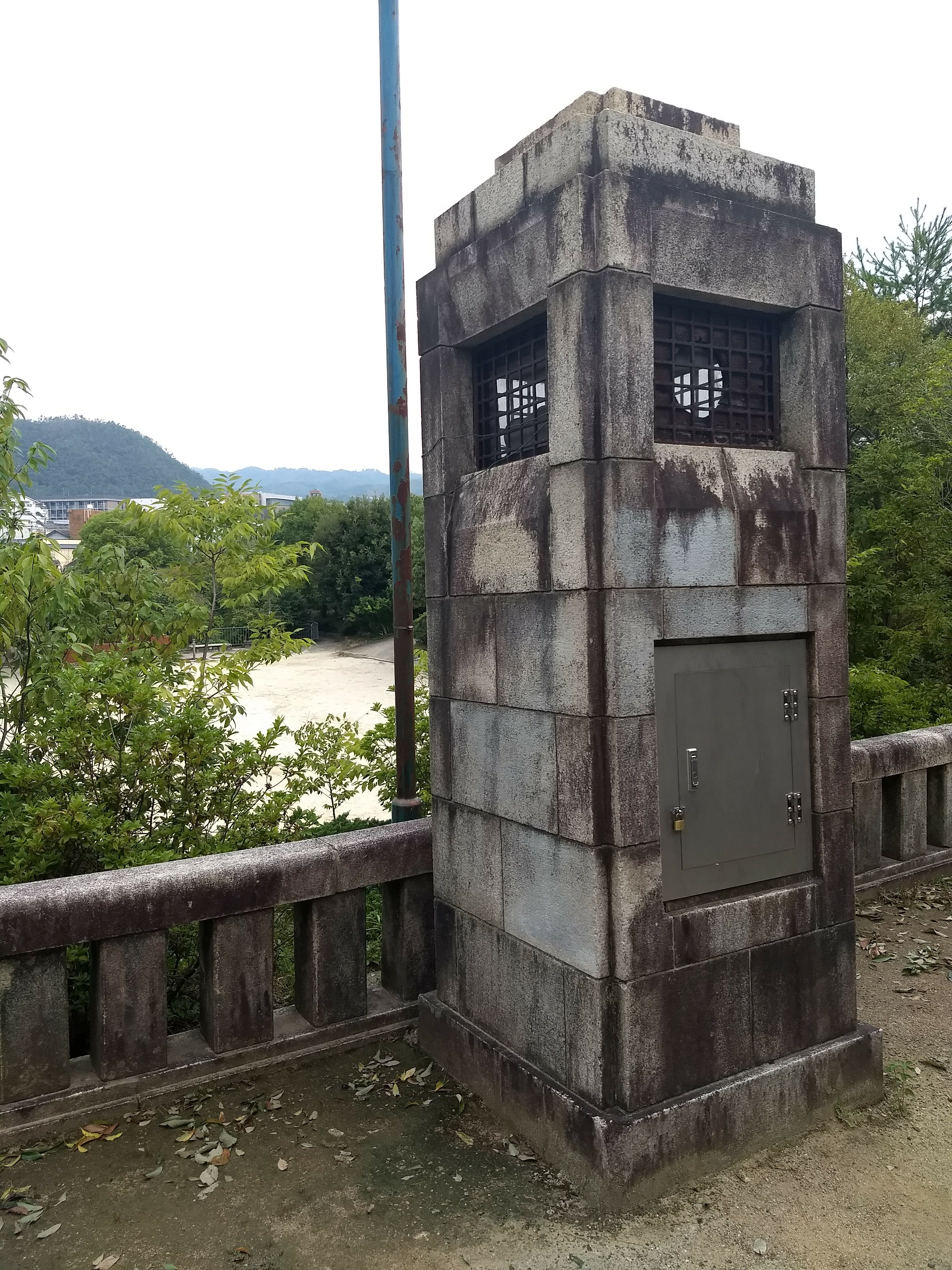
Funaokayama Park, Kyoto

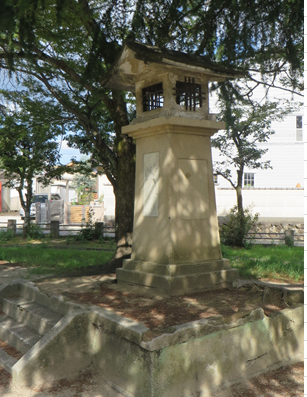
Komatsubara Park, Kyoto

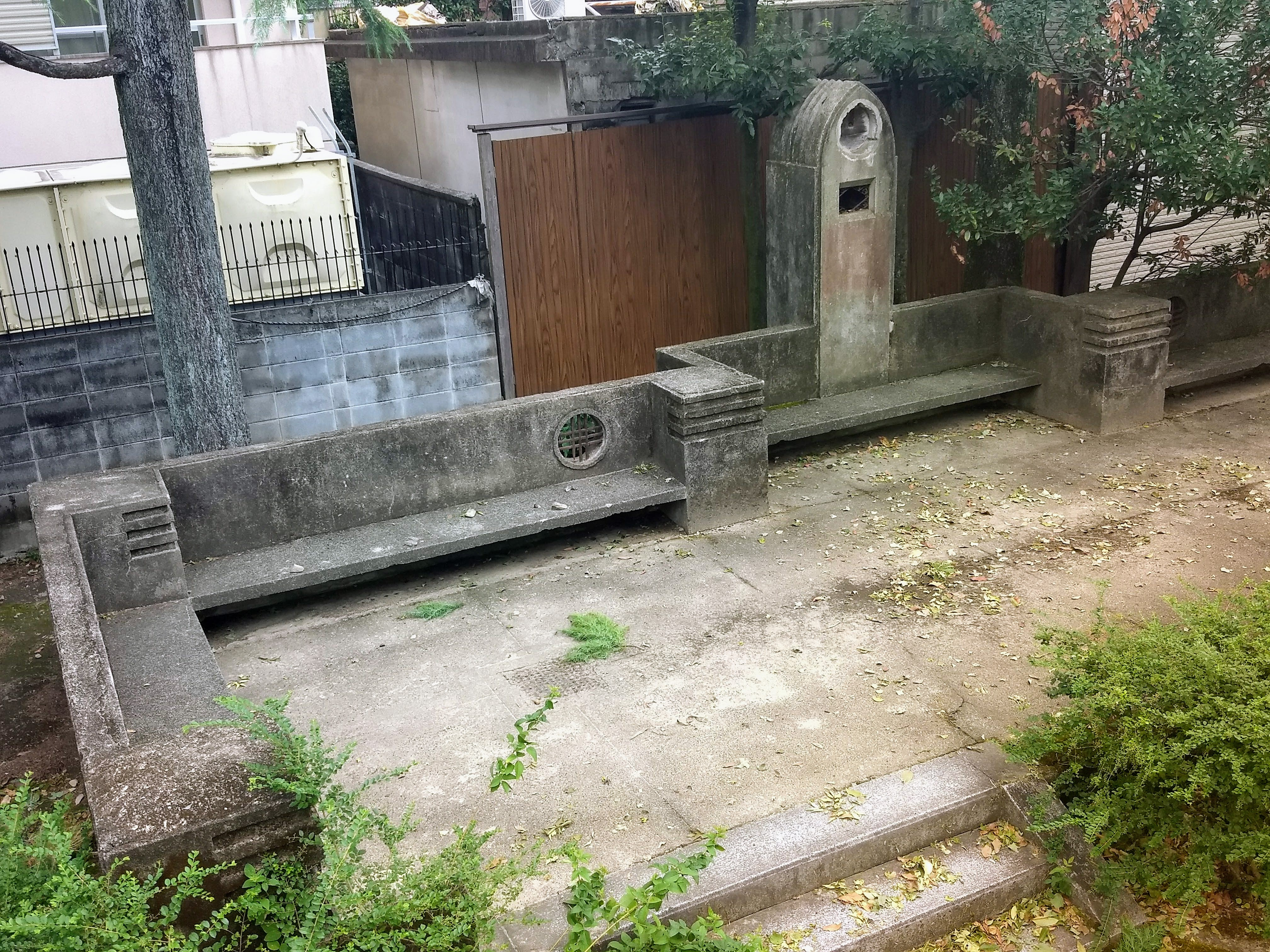
Murasakino-yanagi Park, Kyoto

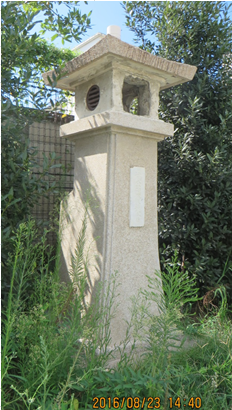
Tachibana Park, Kyoto

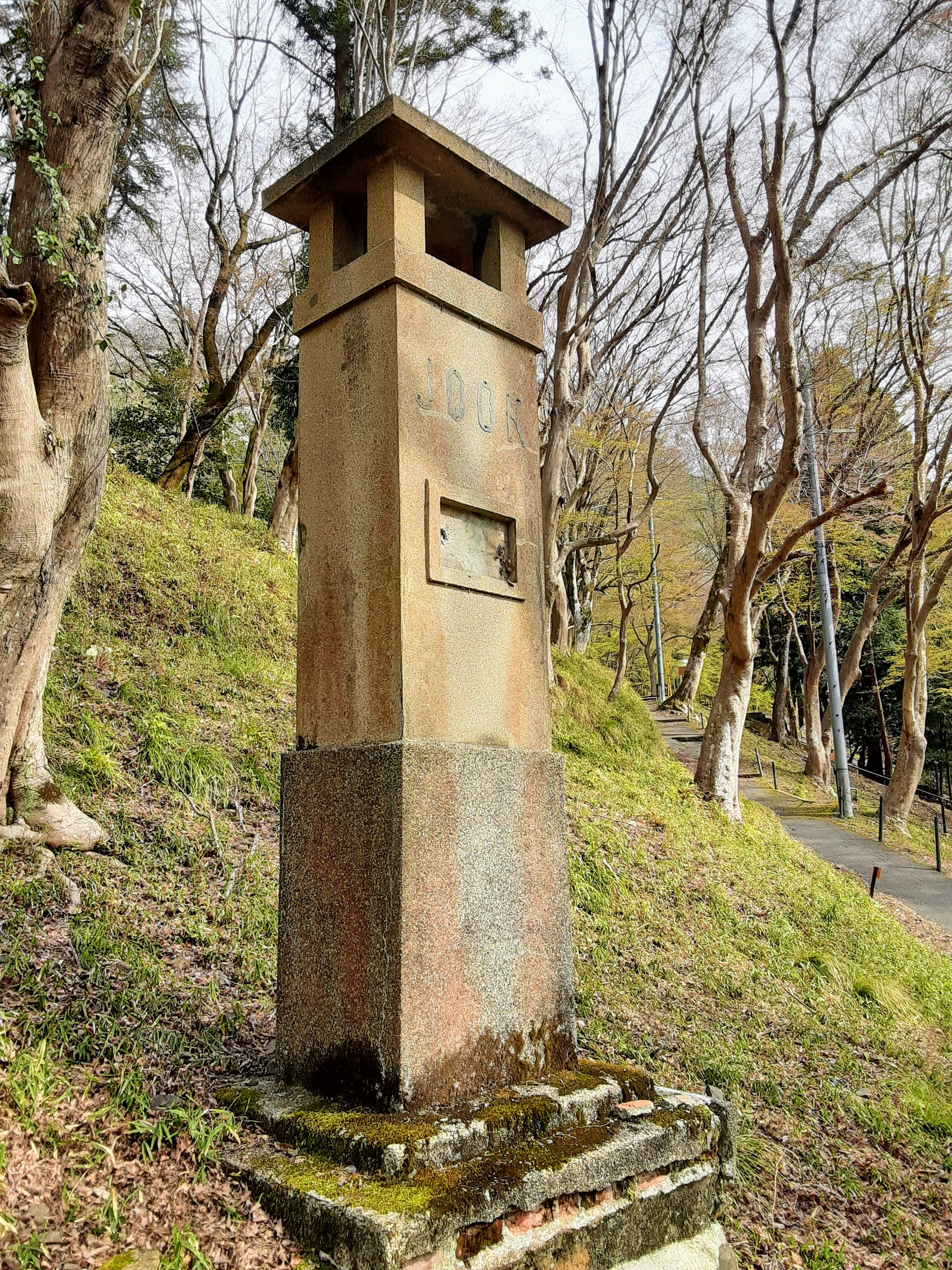
Radio Tower, Yase, Kyoto

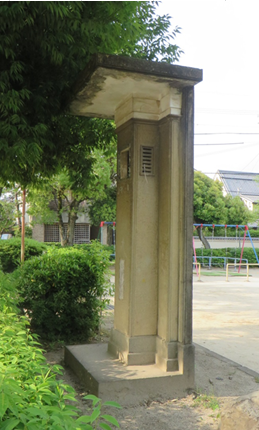
Hagi-jidō Park, Kyoto

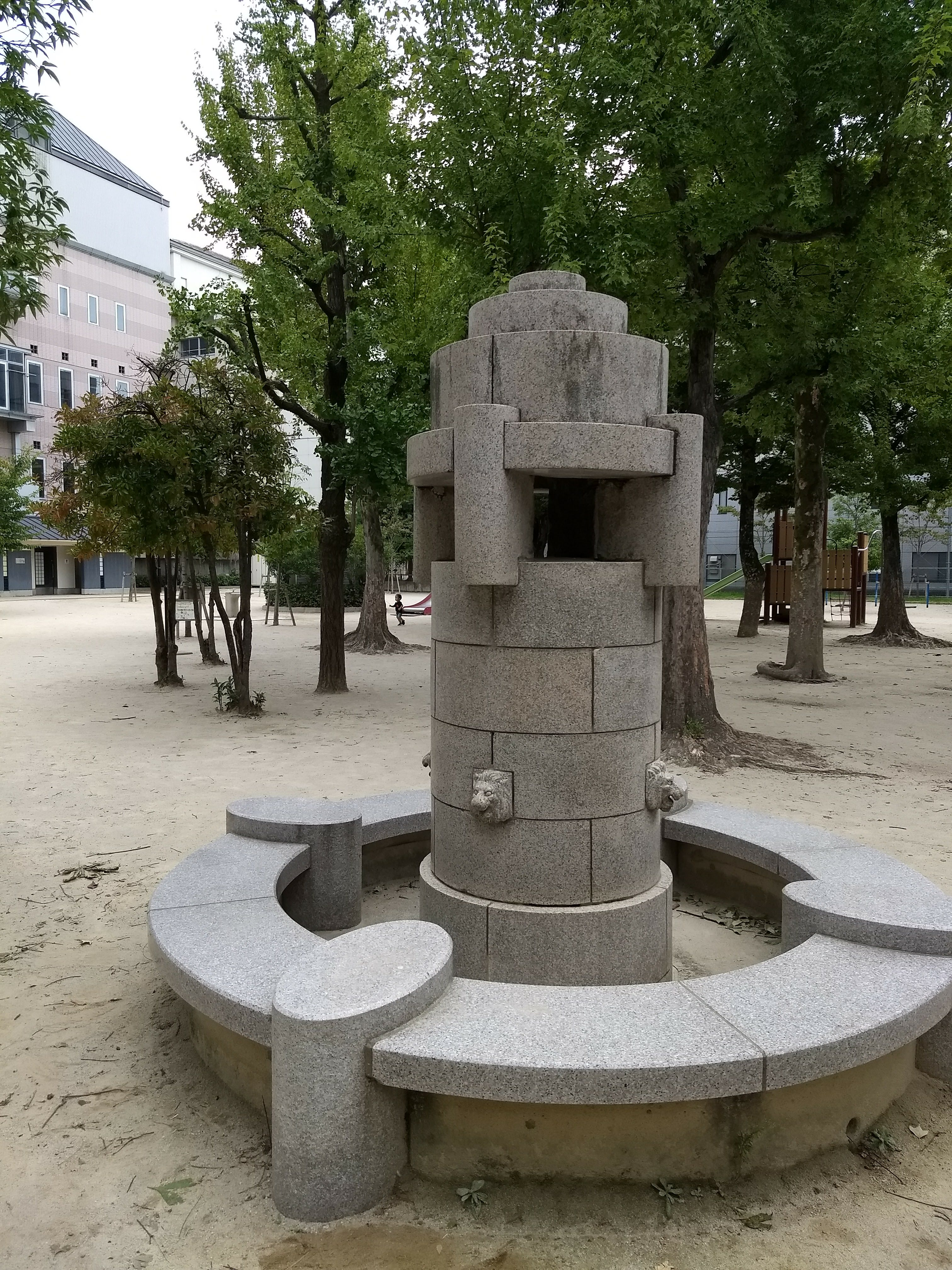
Misayama Park, Kyoto

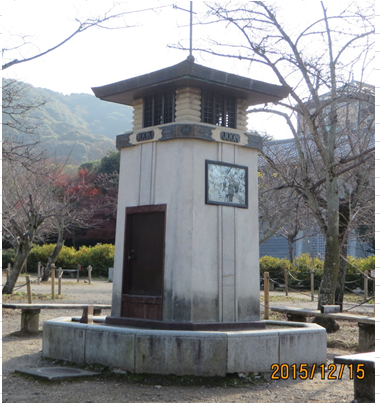
Maruyama Park, Kyoto

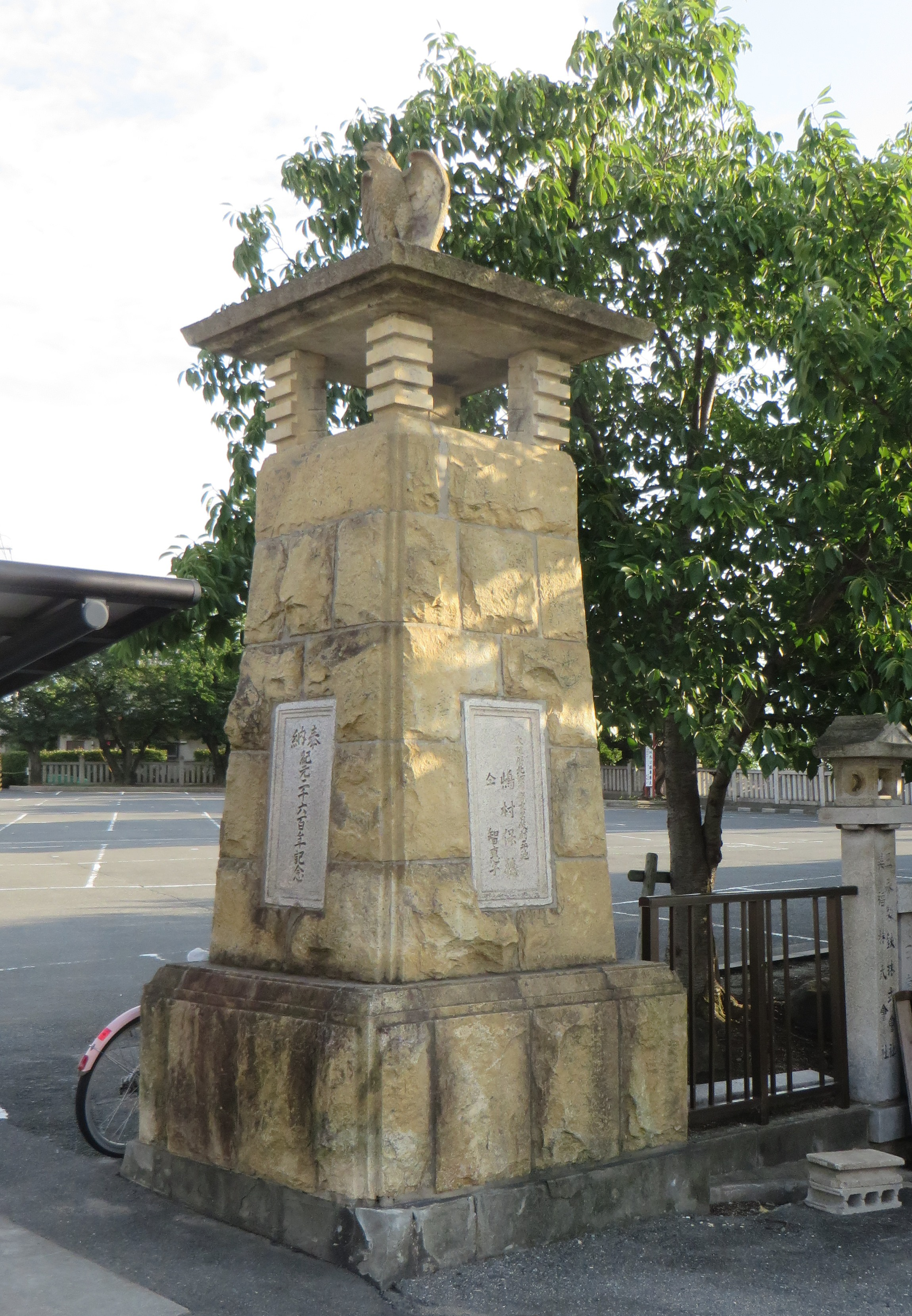
Naritayama Fudōson Shrine, Neyagawa City

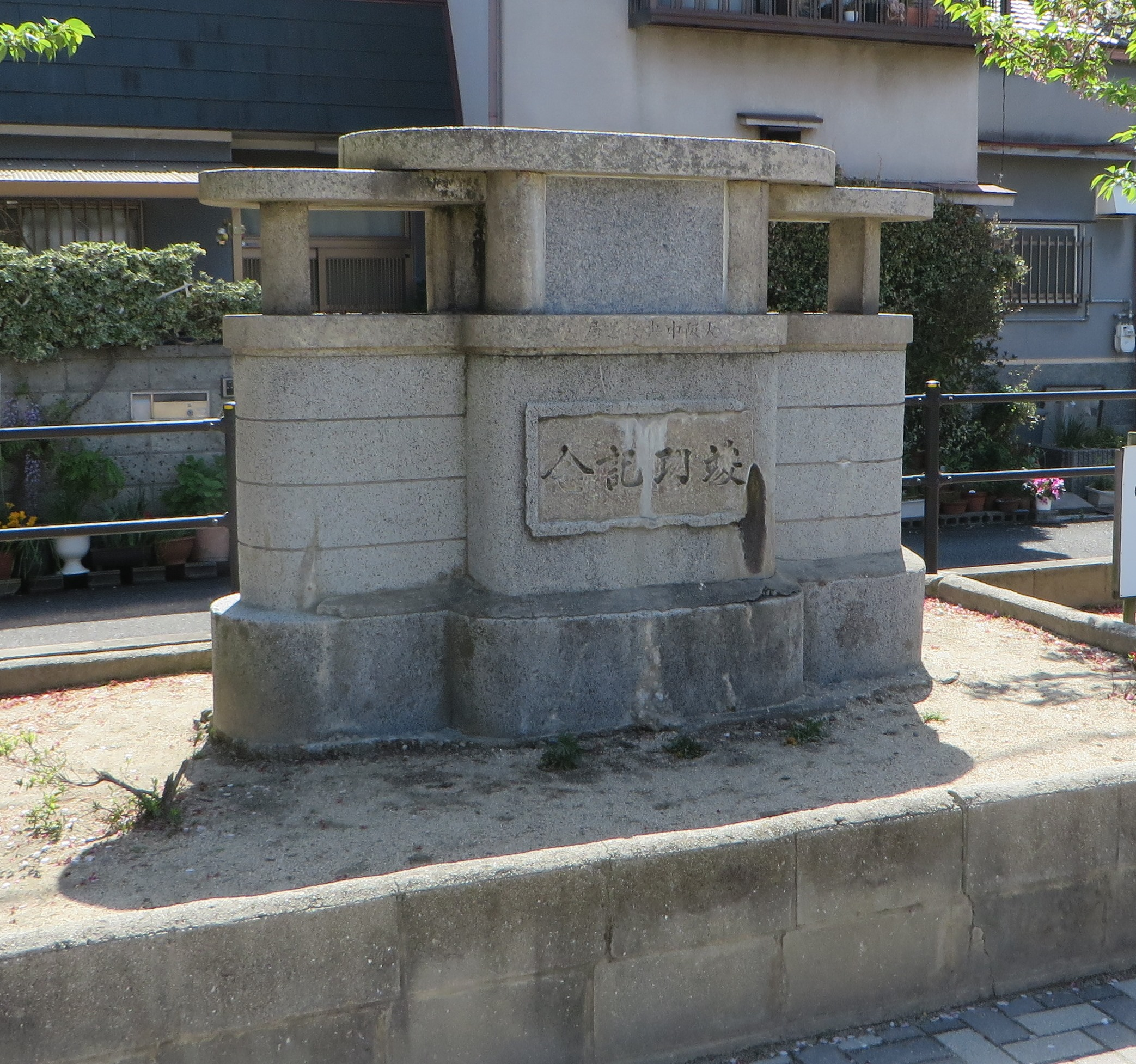
Yamato Park, Higashi Osaka City

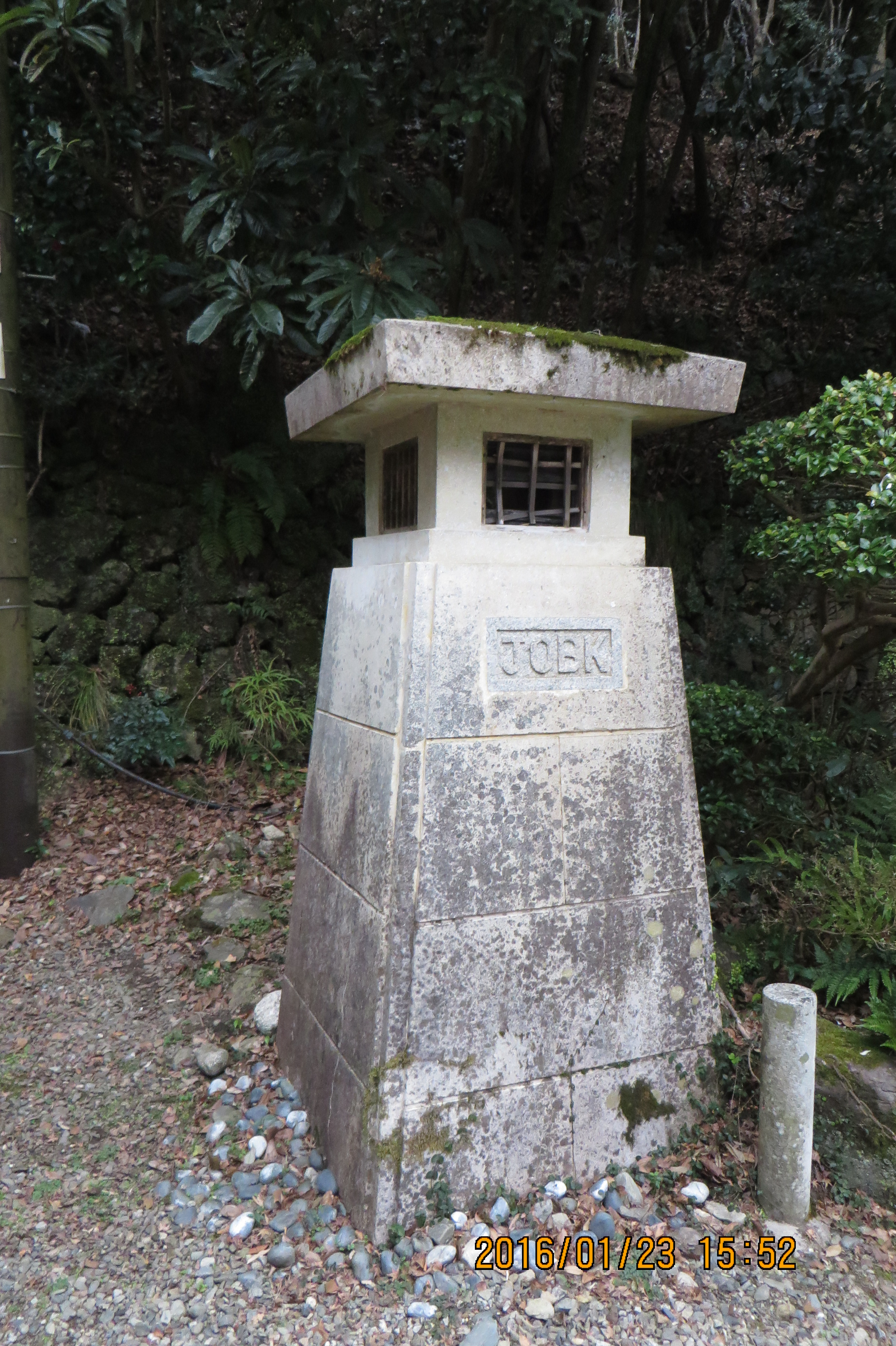
Minō Park, Ryūanji Temple Grounds, Minō City

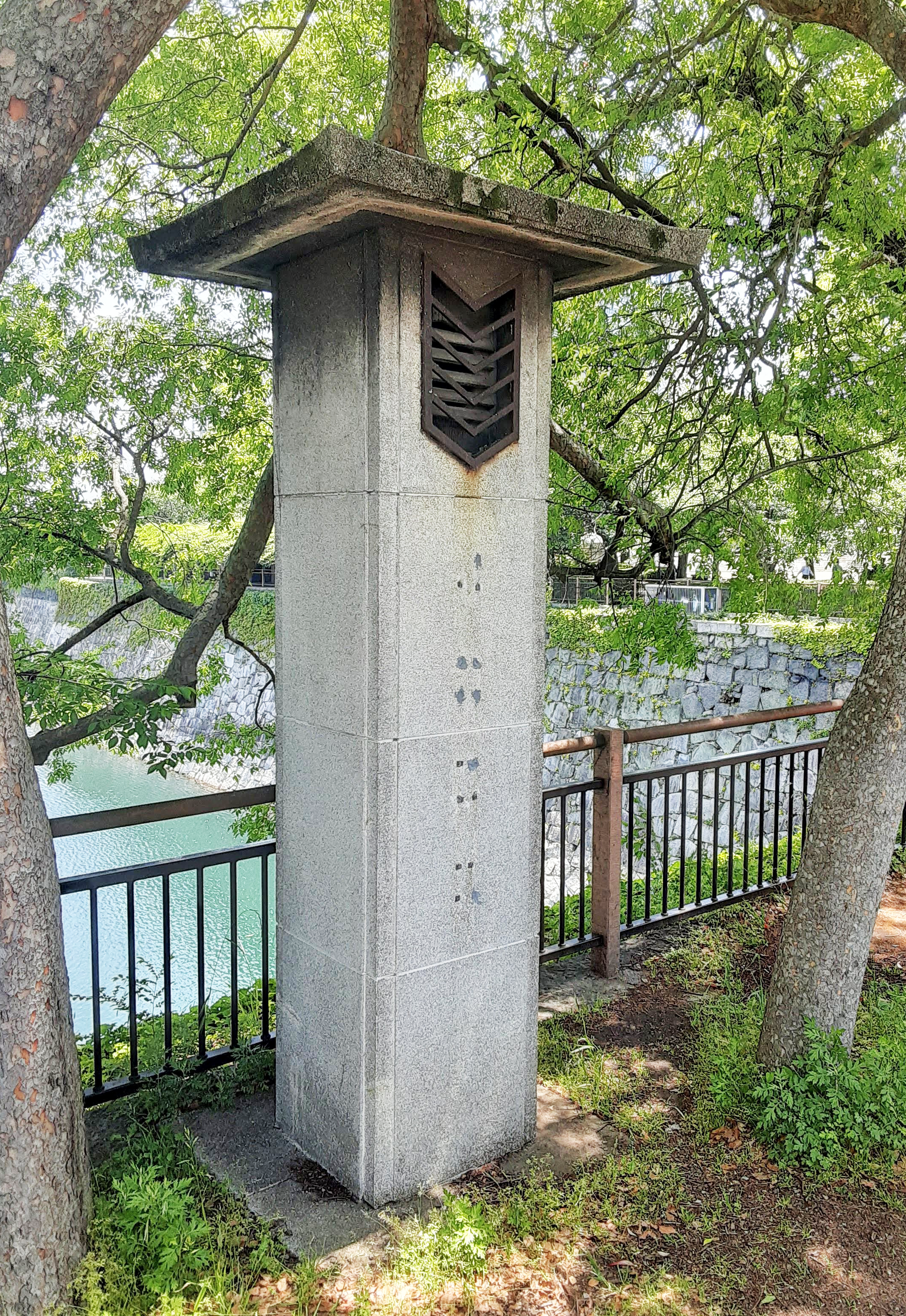
Radio Tower, grounds of Osaka Castle

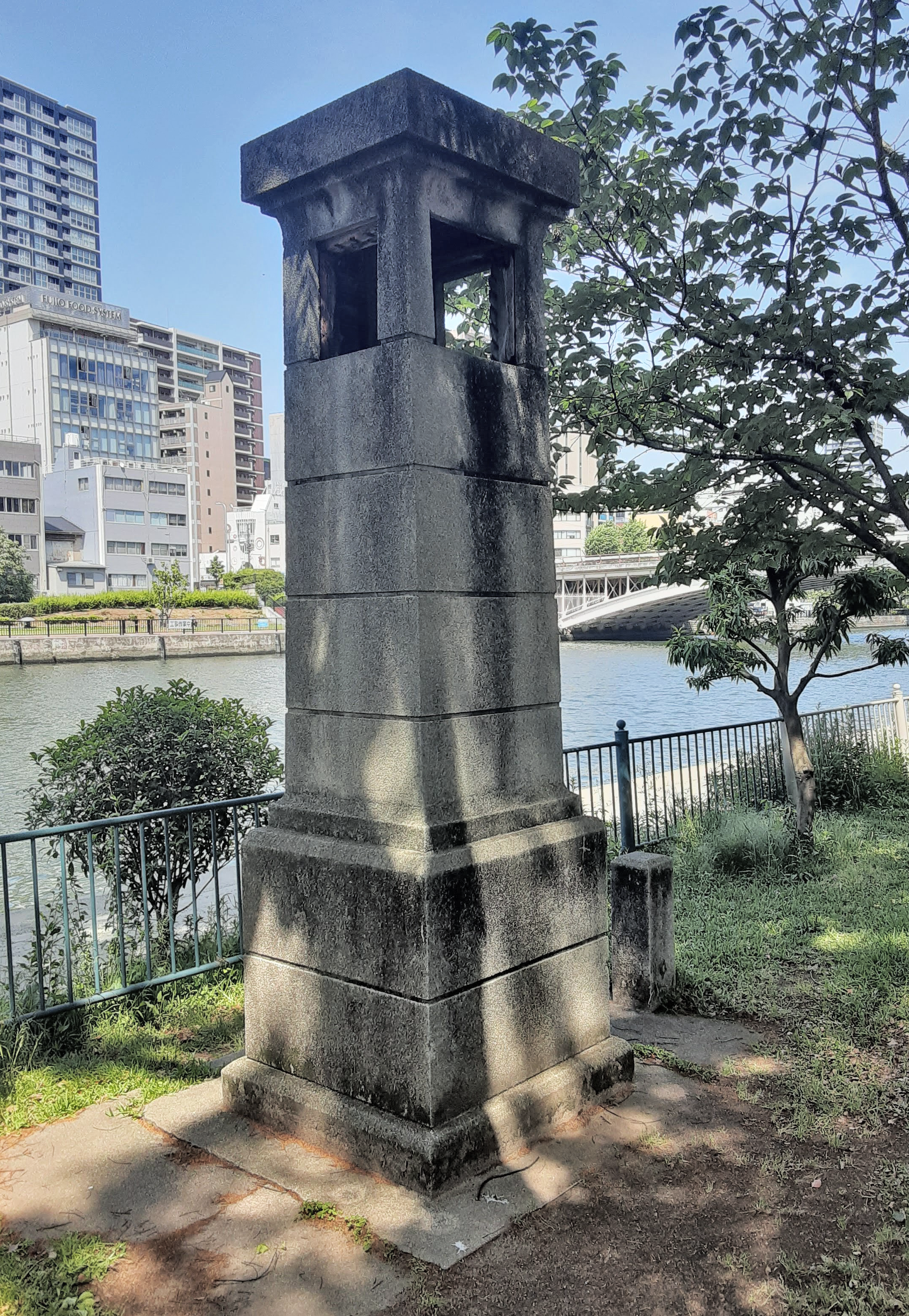
Radio Tower, Nakanoshima Park, Osaka

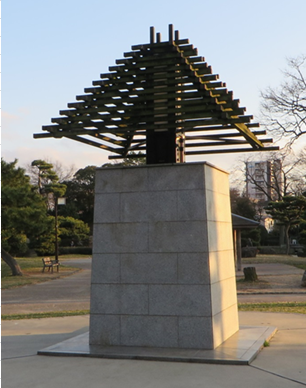
Sumiyoshi Park, Sumiyoshi-ku, Osaka (Rebuilt 1993)

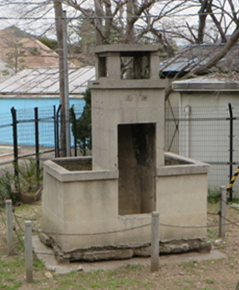
Ōhama Park, Sakai City (1933 original)

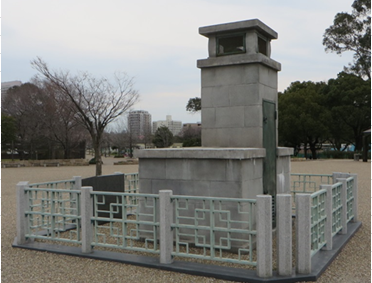
Ōhama Park, Sakai City (2011 replica)

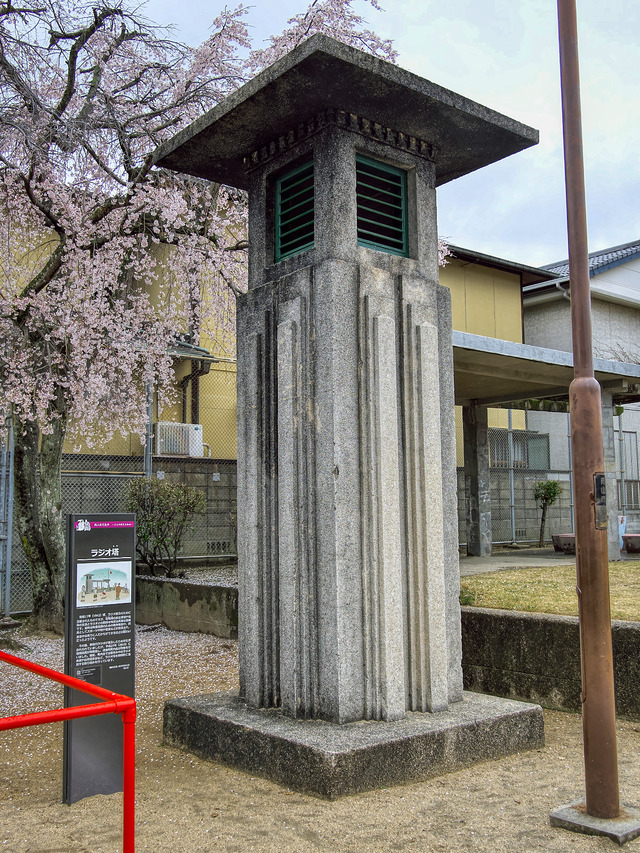
Kami'ifuku-nishi Park, Okayama

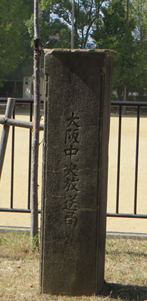
Ōso Park, Toyonaka City (partial)

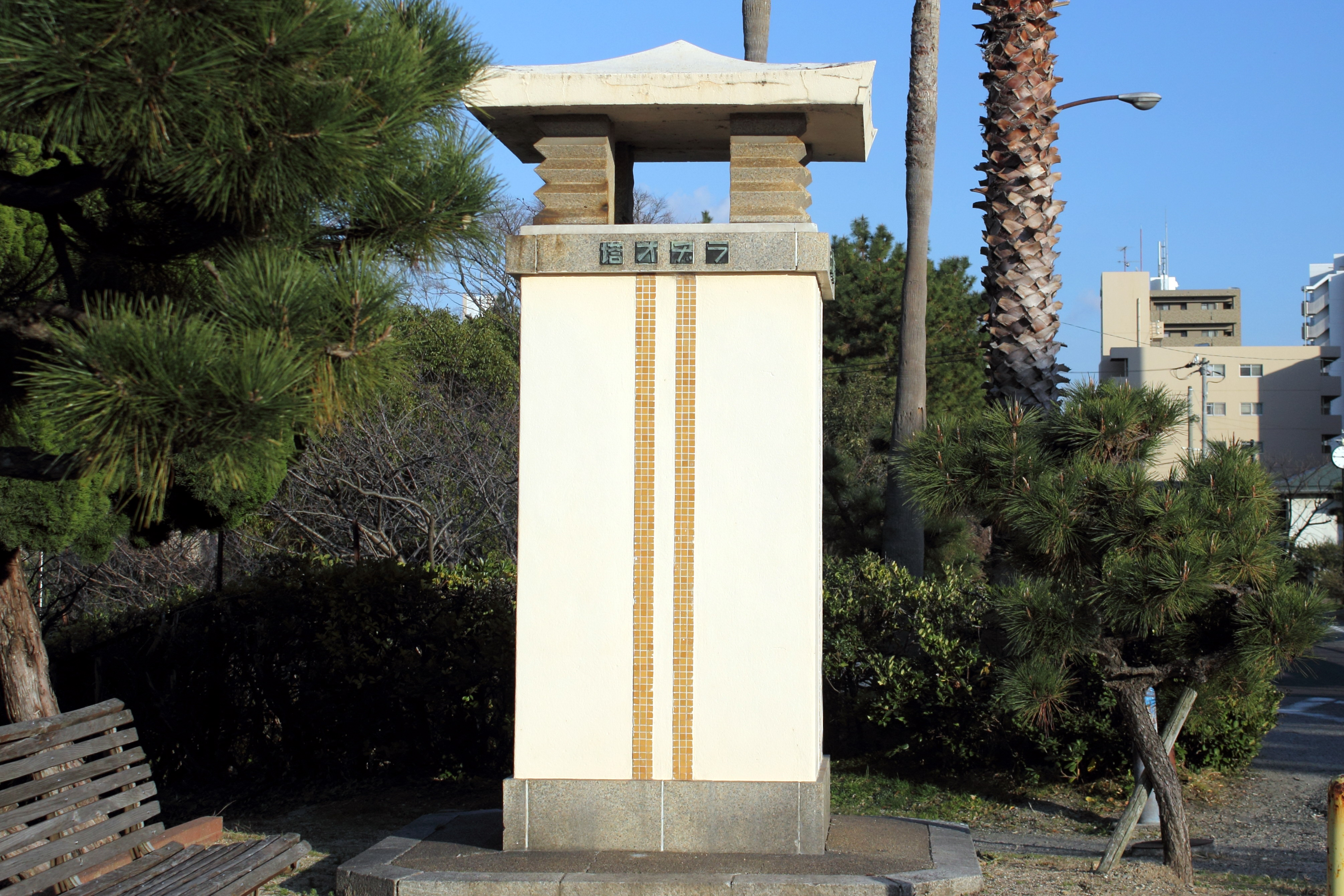
Nakasaki Amusement Park, Akashi City
Cultural Property No. 28-0556

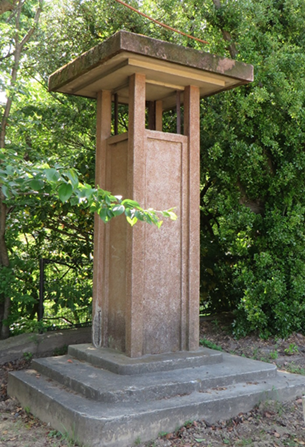
Suwayama Park, Kobe

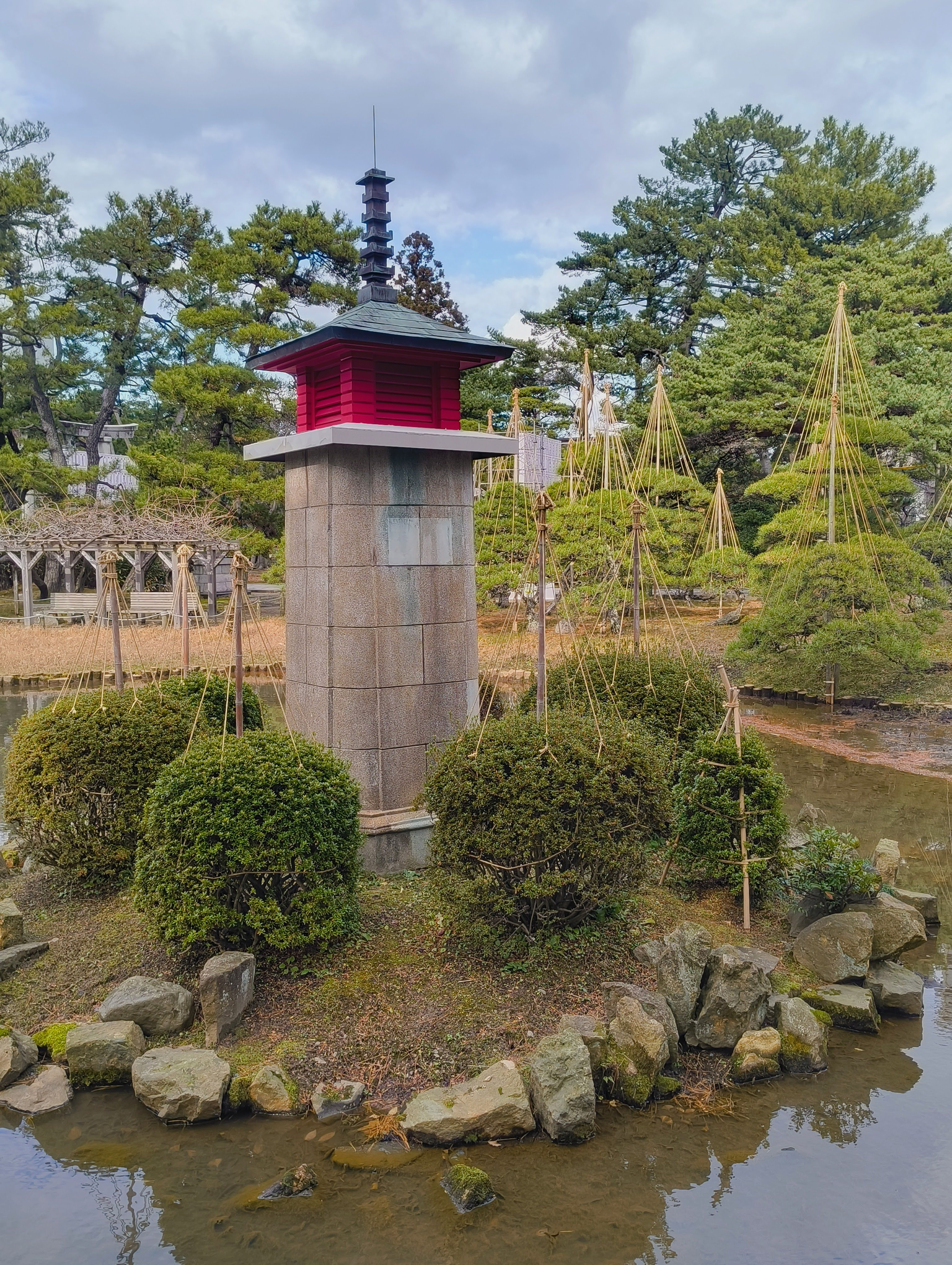
Radio tower in Hakusan Park, Niigata

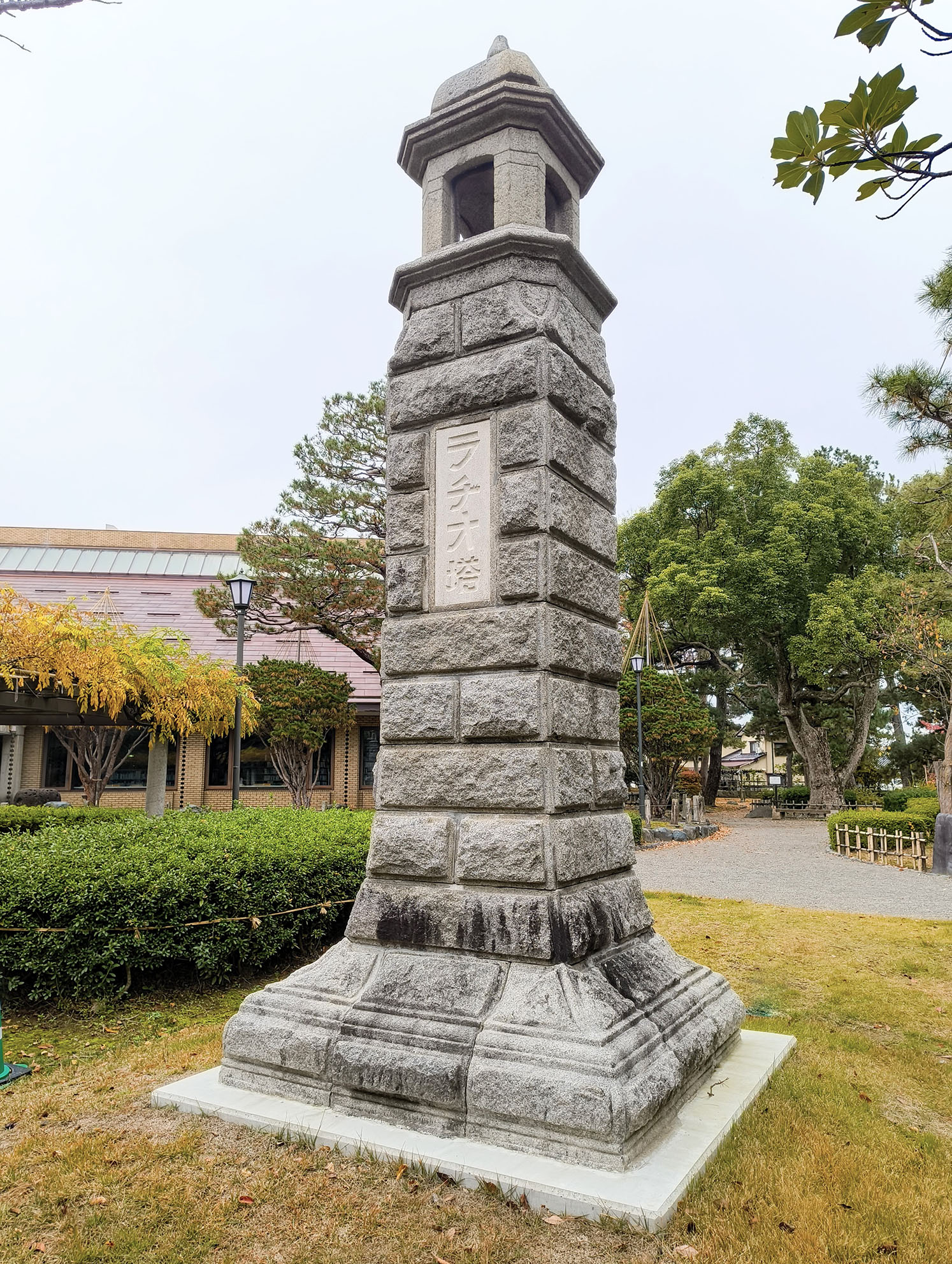
Radio Tower in Rojo Park, Komatsu (Ishikawa)

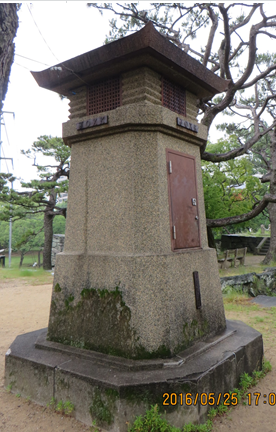
Tokushima Chūō Park, Tokushima City

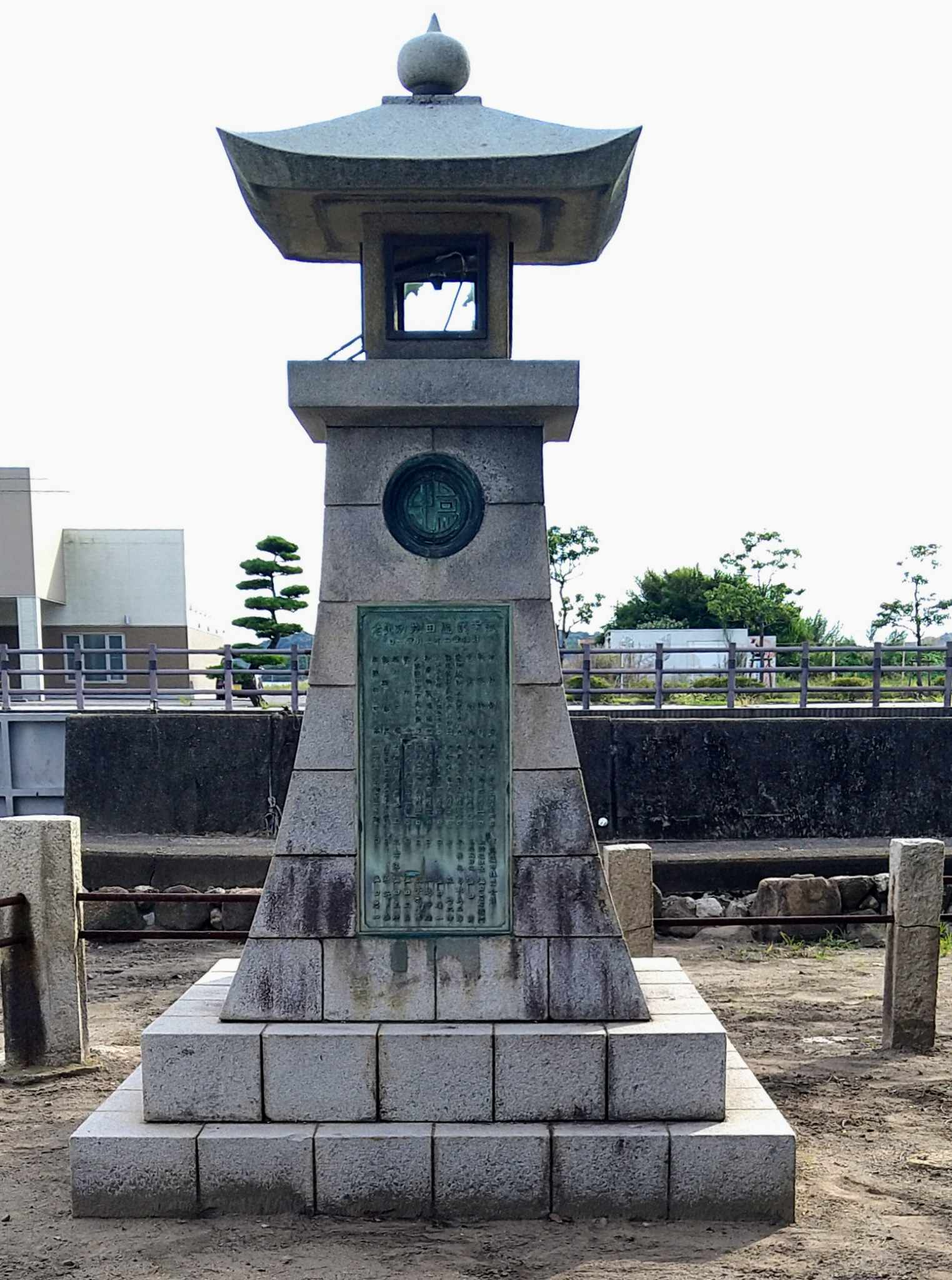
Shiogama Temple, Nio-chō, Kagawa

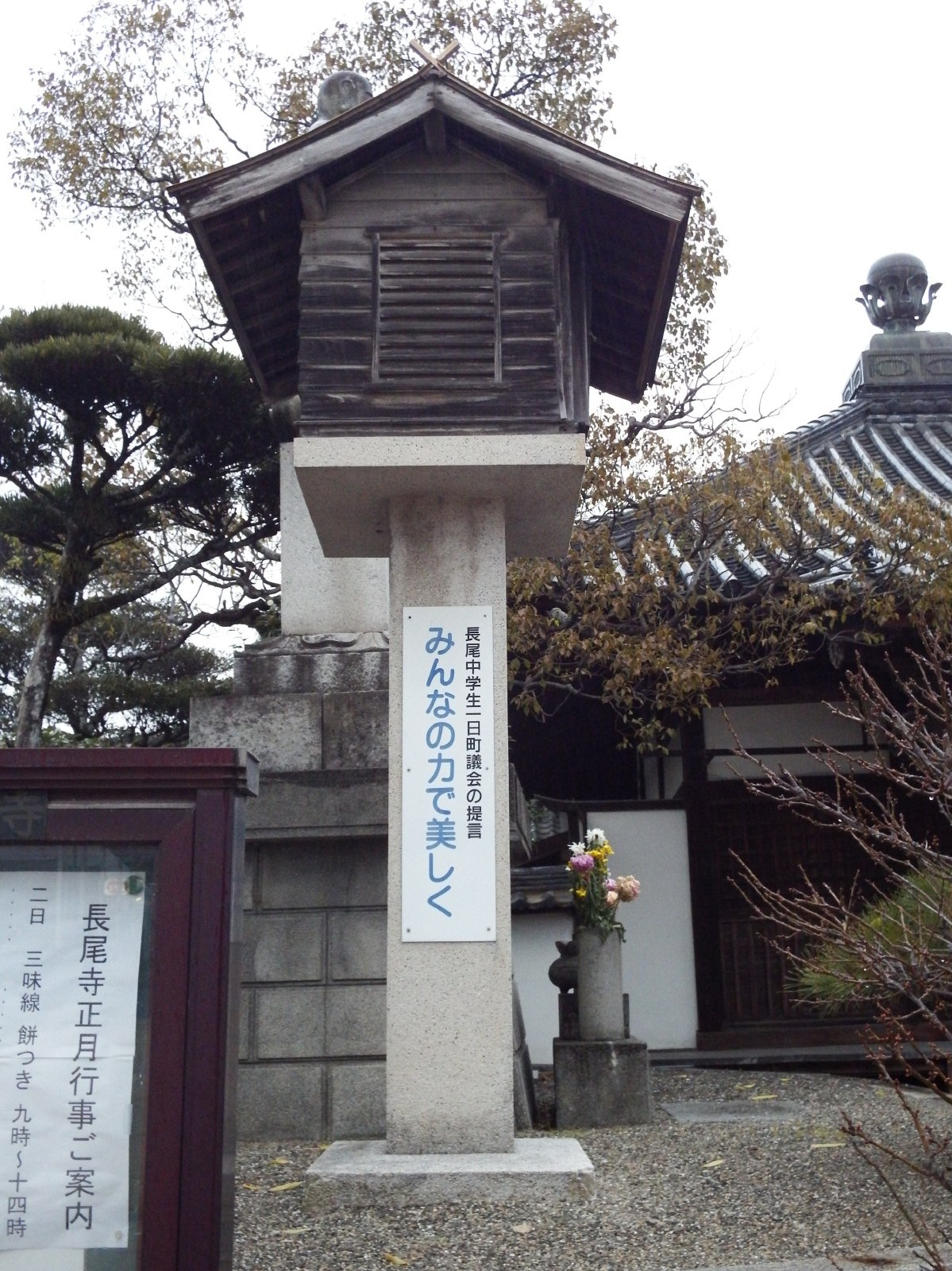
Nagao-dera Shrine, Sanuki CIty

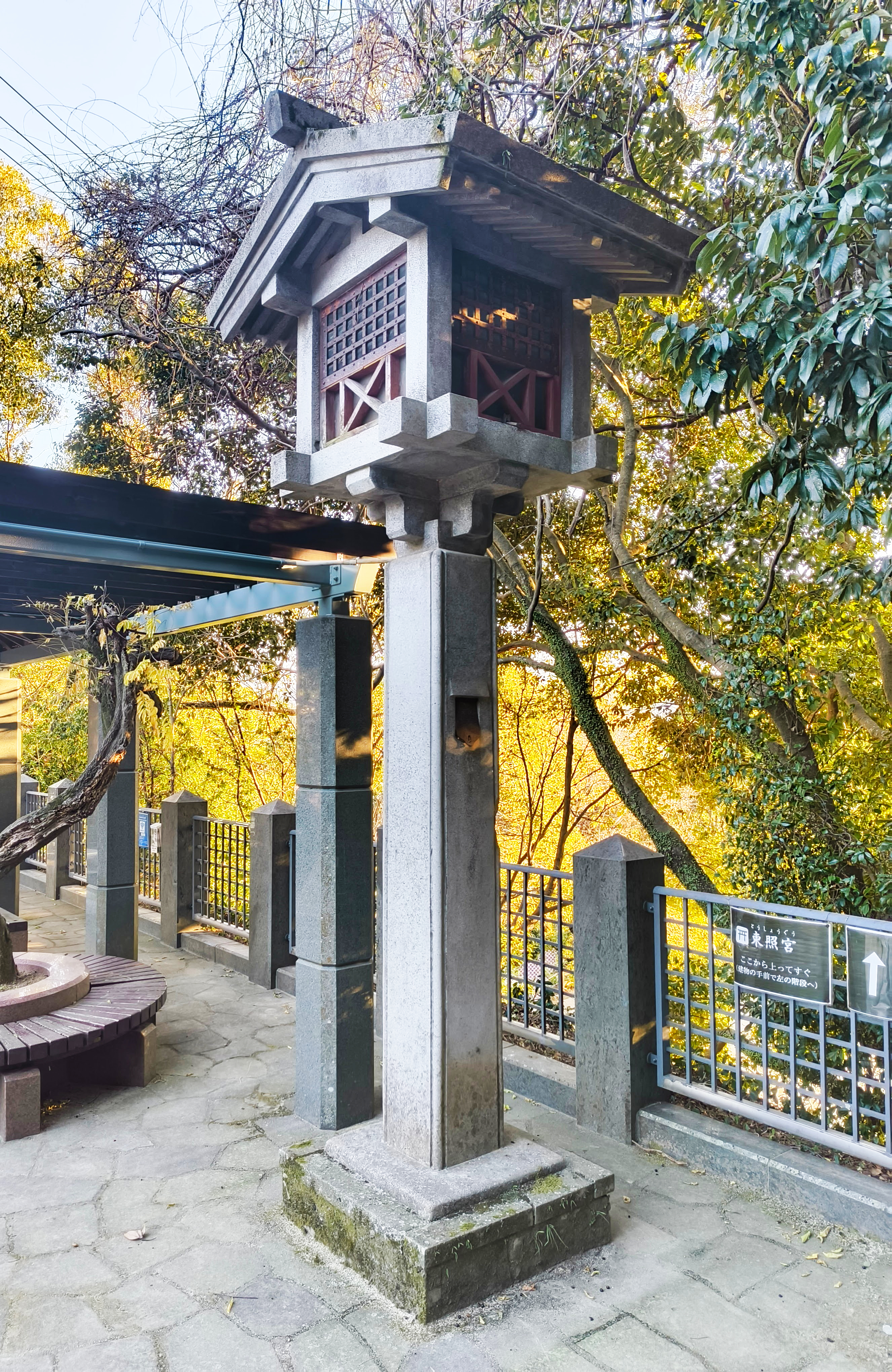
Radio tower in grounds of Nagasaki Park, next to Suwa Jinja

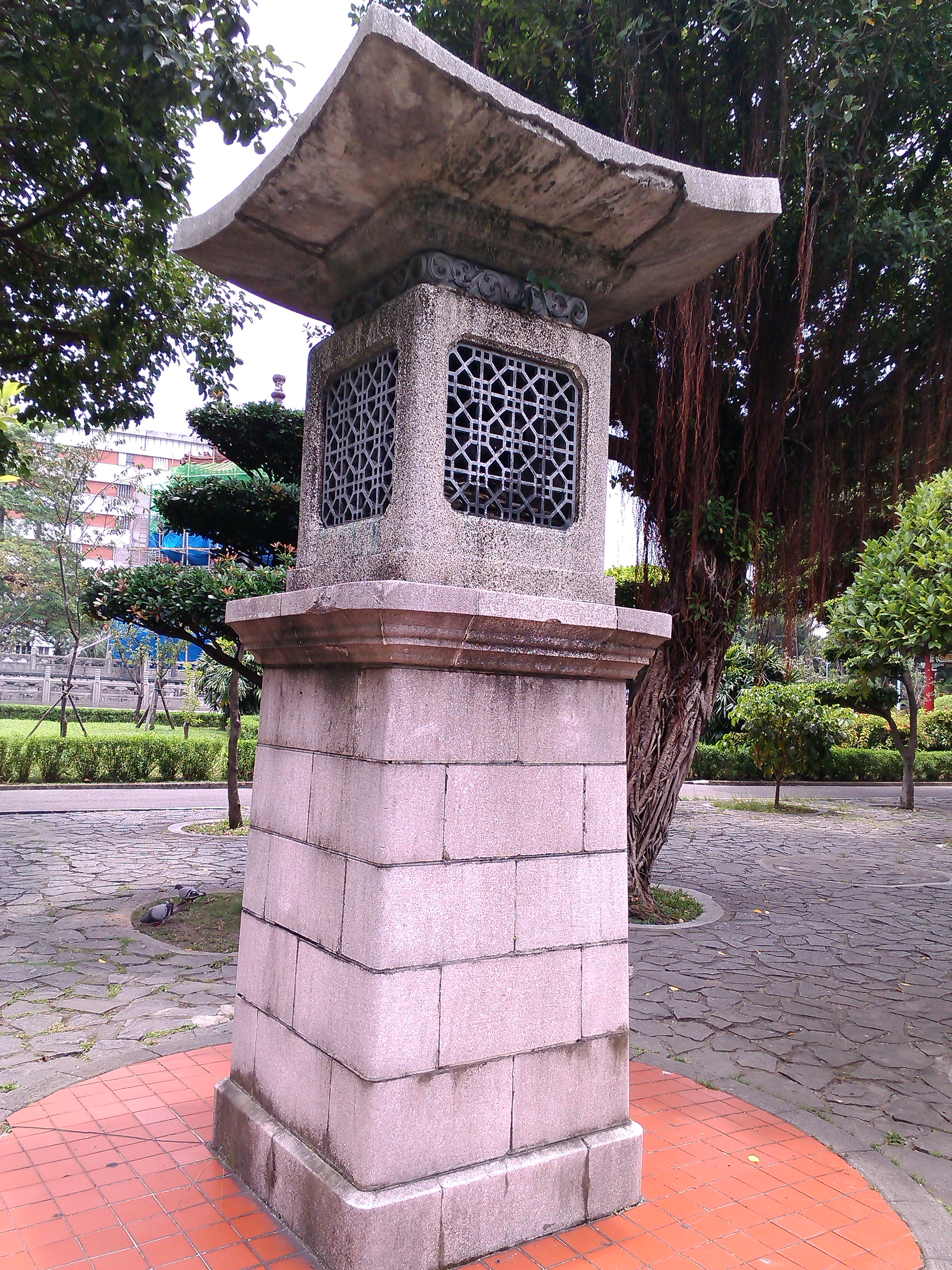
228 Peace Memorial Park, Taipei, Taiwan
